= List of Dutch patrician families =

List of Dutch patrician families in the official Nederland's Patriciaat, published since 1910.

Branches of the same family are separated by a slash (/).

== A ==
Van der Aa • Aalbersberg / Aalbertsberg • Abbing / Roscam Abbing • Abeleven • Aberson / Colson Aberson / van der Hardt Aberson / Wigeri Aberson • d'Abo • Acket • Acquoy • Hora Adema • Adriani / van der Tuuk Adriani • Advocaat • d'Ailly • Van Akerlaken • Albarda • Alberdingk / Alberdingk Thijm • van Alderwerelt / van Alderwerelt van Rosenburgh / de Roo van Alderwerelt • (Van) Alkemade / van Rijn van Alkemade • Van Alphen (Etten) / Pascal van Alphen • van Alphen (Keulen) • van Alphen (Rotterdam) • Alpherts • van Regteren Altena • Altes / Korthals Altes / Meursing Korthals Altes • Ament • Ameshoff • Ancher / Brouwer Ancher • van Andel • Andrau • nl:André de la Porte • Andreae (Fürstenwalde) • Andreae (Hitzum) / Beucker Andreae / van Bothnia Andreae / Fockema Andreae / Nauta Andreae • Ankersmit / Kok Ankersmit • Van Appeltere • d'Aquin • van Arkel • Arntz / Ratering Arntz • Arntzenius • Arriëns / Lincklaen Arriëns • Asser / Nijhoff Asser • d'Aumerie

== B ==
Baart de la Faille • De la Faille • Baartz • Bachiene • Backer • Backer van Leuven • Huyghens Backer • Badon Ghyben • Baelde • Van Baerle • Baert • Bake • De Menthon Bake • Van den Wall Bake • Bakhuijsen • Van de Sande Bakhuijzen • Bakker (Goedereede) • Bakker (Rostock) • Balfour(geslacht) • Balfour van Burleigh • Balguerie • Ballot • Buys Ballot • den Bandt • Banga • Bannier • Banning • Weyn Banningh • Barbas(geslacht) • De Bas • Bastert • Bastiaanse • Van Bouwdijk Bastiaanse • Haak Bastiaanse • Batenburg • Van Basten Batenburg • Battaerd • Baud • Bauduin • De Beaufort • Beaujon • Beausar • Van Breda Beausar • Beckman • Wiardi Beckman • Beeckman • Van Beeftingh • Beelaerts • Beelaerts van Emmichoven • Beelaerts van Blokland • Beeldemaker • Beels • Den Beer Poortugael • van Beest • Van Voorst van Beest • Beets • Van Bemmelen • Benier • Benteyn • Bentfort • Bentfort van Valkenburg • Drossaart Bentfort • Van Berckel • Bere • Lach de Bere • Van Berenbroeck • Van den Berg (Dongen) • Van den Berg • Bentz van den Berg • Bland van den Berg • Van Maren Bentz van den Berg • van den Berg • Van den Berg van Saparoea • Berger • Van den Bergh • van den Bergh van Heinenoord • Van Benthem van den Bergh • Bergsma • Berlekom • Van Berdenis • Bernicke • Bert • de Bert • Schrassert Bert • Besier • Bettink • Wefers Bettink • Betz • Beuker • Van Beuningen • Van Beusekom • Hubert van Beusekom • Van Beusekom (Doetinchem) • Beyen • De Beyer • Beyerinck • Beyerman • Beijnen • van Duijfhuijs Beijnen • Koolemans Beijnen • Bichon • Bichon Vingerhoedt • Bichon Visch • Bichon van IJsselmonde • Bicker • Bicker Caarten • De Bie • Bienema • van Bienema • Bienfait • Bierens de Haan • Bodel Bienfait • Van den Biesen • Vongers van den Biesen • Bijl • Bik • Arnold Bik • Butin Bik • Mulock van der Vlies Bik • de Nijs Bik • de Perez Bik • Vreede Bik • Bilderdijk • van der Bilt • Binkes • Binkhorst • Binkhorst van Oudcarspel en in Koedijk • Bischoff • Bischoff van Heemskerck • Bischoff Tulleken • Bisdom • Van Lakerveld Bisdom • Reijnders Bisdom • Wijckerheld Bisdom • Blaauw (Stadlohn) • Blaauw (Westzaan) • Blaisse • Blanckenhagen • Blankenheym • Blankert • Bloembergen • Bloemers • Blokhuis • Blokhuyzen • Blom (Delft) • Blom (Eemnes) • Blom (Hindelopen) • Blom (Kleef) • Blom (Oost-Vlaanderen) • Blomhert • van Blommestein • Blussé • Blussé van Oud-Alblas • Van Braam Blussé • Blijdenstein • Blenken Blijdenstein • de Stoppelaar Blijdesteijn • Boddaert • Boddens • Boden (patriciaatgeslacht) • Bohlen (Boelen) • Boelens • van Boelens • Boellaard • Boerlage • Boeye • Bogaers • Bogaert • Nering Bogel • Bohtlingk • Du Bois • Boissevain • Bok • Boll • Bolomey • Bondam • Bonebakker • Bongaerts • Bonnike • Boogaert • Boom • Isebree Boom • De Lange Boom • Plevier Boom • Boomkamp • van Leeuwen Boomkamp • Boon (Rotterdam) • Boon • Boon Hartsinck • Boon van Ostade • Boonacker • Boonen • Boot • Moerkerk Boot • Nagtglas Boot • De Booij • Van Bommel van Vloten • De Bordes • Van Walré de Bordes • Borgesius • Zuiderveen Borgesius (eerste geslacht) • Borgesius (tweede geslacht) • Von dem Borne • Borret • Borski • Van Noord Borski • Van Wieringhen Borski • Bosch • Ten Bosch • Van den Bosch (Breda) • Van den Bosch (Rheden) • Van den Bosch (Rotterdam) • Bosscha • van Bosse • Boumeester • Bouricius • Visscher Bouricius • Boutmy • Bouvin • Bouvy • Bouwensch • Braakenburg • Brakenburg • Van Braam • Van Braam Houckgeest • Van Braam van Vloten • Braams • Brandt • Brants • Brantsma • Willinge Brantsma • De Brauw • Ten Noever de Brauw • Stavenisse de Brauw • Bredius • Klinkhamer Bredius • Van der Breggen • Van der Breggen Paauw • Breukelman • Briët • de la Saussaye Briët • van den Brink • Bakhuizen van den Brink • Van den Broecke • De Smit van den Broecke •Van den Broek (Geulle) • Van den Broek d' Obrenan • Van den Broek (Babyloniënbroek) • Vun den Broeke • Broers • Broese • Broese van Groenou • Le Bron de Vexela • Brongersma • Bedloo de Bronovo • Brousson • Clockener Brousson • Reeling Brouwer • Browne • Van der Brugghen • Bruinier • Bruins • Brutel de la Rivière • Bruijn • Bruijn van Rozenburg • Van der Horst Bruijn • Van Oosterwijk Bruijn • De Bruyn (Herpen) • De Bruyn • De Bruin ('s-Hertogenbosch) • De Bruyn (Kockengen) • De Bruyn van Melis- en Mariekerke • de Bruyn • Van Troostenburg de Bruyn • Lobry van Troostenburg de Bruyn • Bruijns • Mörzer Bruijns • Buchler • Buck • Budde • Cost Budde • Buma • De Blocq van Haersma Buma • Van Haersma Buma • Hopperus Buma • Hora Buma • Bunge • Buning • De Cock Buning • Werumcus Buning • Van Buren • Burger • Burkens • Buschkens • Busmann • Hartman Busmann • Star Busmann • Tjaden Busmann • Bussemaker (Emlichheim) • Bussemaker (Hengelo) • Barlagen Bussemaker • Buteux • Buys • De Buys • De Buys Roessingh • Buyskes • Bybau • De Bye • Thierry de Bye • Van Bijlert • Bijleveld (Rhoon) • Bijleveld (Westfalen) • Van Eijk Bijleveld • Bijvoet • Van Dieren Bijvoet

== C ==
Caan • Caan van Neck • De la Bassecour Caan • Caarten • Van Calcar • Van Calker • Sharpe van Calker • Van Kalker • Calkoen • van Beeck Calkoen • Callenbach • Callenfels • Van der Beke Callenfels • Van Stein Callenfels • Von Stein Callenfels • Carnbier • Camp (Geertruidenberg) • Camp ('s-Hertogenbosch) • Van Campen • Del Campo genaamd Camp • Van Lookeren Campagne • Cankrien • Cannegieter • Hoornsma Cannegieter • Reen Cannegieter • Schrader Cannegieter • Canneman • Cantzlaar • Capadose • Van Capelle • Carbasius • Cardinaal • Carp • De Carpentier • Carsten • Star Nauta Carsten • Van Casteel • Castendijk • Ten Cate • Naudin ten Cate • Cats • Lichtenvoort Cats • Manger Cats • Van Cattenburch • Casteren van Cattenburch • Van Panhuys van Cattenburch • Cau • Cazaux • Cazius • Certon • Rigail Certon • Chabot • Taudin Chabot • Van Charante • Boss van Charante • Mensing van Charante • Moll van Charante • Watson van Charante • Charbon • De Chaufepie • de Dompierre de Chaufepie • Clant • Clant van der Mijll • Clant Schatter • Van Rijneveld Clant • Clarion • Clavareau • Clement • Van der Poest Clement • De Clercq (N.-Brabant) • Van der Lek de Clercq • De Clercq (Vlaanderen) • Cleveringa • Cleyndert • Cleijndert • De Jong Cleijndert • Clifford • Oetgens van Waveren Pancras Clifford • Pancras Clifford • Du Cloux • Alting du Cloux • Lincklaan du Cloux • Cluysenaer • Cnopius • Coenen • Cohen • Cohen Stuart • Coldeweij • Colenbrander • Van Berck Colenbrander • Van Hecking Colenbrander • Collard • Colthoff • Rom Colthoff • De Coningh • Van Assendelft de Coningh • Van Vrijberghe de Coningh • Conrad • Cool (Appingedam) • Cool (Overschie) • Coops • Coops Busgers • Van de Coppello • Kappeyne van de Coppello • Cordelois • Cordes • Corstius • Brandt Corstius • Corten • Coster • Costerman • Costerus • Couperus • Del Court • Couvee • Sauerbier Couvee • Cox • Craandijk • Van der Crab • Cramer (Ootmarsum) • Cramer (Rijnland) • Cramer (Westfalen) • Putman Cramer • Cramer von Baumgarten • Cramerus • De Crane • Van Cranenburgh • Cremer • Cremers • Canter Cremers • Hooftman Canter Cremers • Pathuis Cremers • Creutzberg • Creyghton • Criellaert • Croiset • Crol • Crommelin • Van Wickevoort Crommelin • Croockewit • Crull • Hofstede Crull • Cruys • Cunaeus • Gael Cunaeus

== D ==
Daendels • Dalen • Van Dam (Amersfoort) • Van Dam (Delft) • Boudet van Dam • Van Dam van Isselt • Damste • Daneels van Wijkhuyse • Daniels • Wijnoldy Daniels • Daubanton • Van Deinse • Deketh • Deking Dura • Dekker • Dyserinck Dekker • Huisinga Dekker • Van der Mijll Dekker • Delbeek • Delprat • Dermout • Deurvorst • Van Deventer • Van Dielen • Diemont • Waller Diemont • Diepen • Diepenbrock • Van Diepenbrugge • Diepenhorst • Diephuis • Dierkens • Van Diermen • Dirkzwager / Dirkswager • Van Dishoeck • Van Ditzhuyzen • Dobbelmann • Van Doekum • Doeff (Hazerswoude) • Doeff (Oudshoorn) • Van Doesburgh • Brandt van Doesburgh • De Vries van Doesburgh • Semeyns de Vries van Doesburgh • Doffegnies • Dolleman (Maastricht) • Dolleman (Westzaan) • Thierry de Bye Dolleman • Dommers • Van Dompseler • Donker • Donker Curtius • Donkersloot • Dons • Doorenbos • Doorman • Langguth Doorman • Van Doorn • De Balbian van Doorn • Van Doorne • Van Doorninck • Dorhout • Von Dornberg • Von Dornberg Heiden • Van Dorp • Dorrepaal • Van Dorsser • De Haas van Dorsser • Douglas • Douwes Dekker • Douwes • Douwes Isema • Doyer • Elberts Doyer • Dozy • Drabbe • Von Frijtag Drabbe • Drees • Driebeek • Van Driel van Wageningen • Van den Dries • Driessen • Van Driest • Droogleever Fortuyn • Fortuyn Droogleever • Drost • Druyvesteyn • Drijfhout • Dubourcq • Dufour • Dull • Dumbar • Dunlop • Van Dunné • Van Dusseldorp • Drossaart van Dusseldorp • Van der Dussen • Dutilh • Dutry • Dutry van Haeften • Duuring • Duycker • Dijckmeester • Van Dijk • Van Dijk van 't Velde • Van Dijck • Dyserinck • Kleiweg Dyserinck • Dijxhoorn

== E ==
Van der Eb • Ebeling (Groningen) • Ebeling (Hildesheim) • Eck • Van Eck (Drumpt) • Van Eck (Eck en Wiel) • Van Eck (Rotterdam) • Van Eeghen • Eekhout • Hachmeester Eekhout • Eeckhout • Van Eelde • De la Sablonière van Eelde • Van Eerten • Westerbeek van Eerten • Van Eeten • Begram van Eeten • Egeling • Guldensteeden Egeling • Egidius • Egter • Egter van Wissekerke • Van Eik • Eindhoven • Cremer Eindhoven • Elias • Witsen Elias • Elout • Elsevier • Van der Elst (Antwerpen) • Van der Elst (Driel) • Hupkens van der Elst • Van der Elst (Utrecht) • Emants • Van Embden • Emmen • Tjaden Emmen • Engelberts (Nordhorn) • Engelberts (Uithuizermeeden) • Engelbrecht • D'Engelbronner • Engelenburg • Engelhard • Engels • Enklaar • Enklaar van Guericke • Enschede • Durselen Enschede • Ermerins • Van Erpecum • Erzey • Eschauzier • Escher • Van Essen • Evekink • Evekink Busgers • Van Voorst Evekink • Everard • Van Everdingen • Everts • Everwijn • Van Ewijck • Eijck • Eijck van Zuylichem • Burman Eyck tot Zuylichem • Van Eyk • Sprenger van Eyk • Eijkman • Eijkman van der Kemp • Eyma • Eysten • Wackie Eysten

== F ==
Fabius • Fangman • Fauchey • Faure • Van der Feen • Van der Feen de Lille • Feenstra • Feith (Obershausen, Nassau) • Feith (Elburg) • Fernhout • Fenema • Borgerink Fenema • Van Fenema • Ferf • Fermin • Le Fèvre de Montigny • De Feyfer • Van der Flier • Flieringa • De Flines • Fock • Von Brucken Fock • Fockema • Fokker • Folkersma • Folmer • Van Orsoy de Flines • Fontein I • Alg(e)ra Fontein • Fontein II • Van Dalsen Fontein • Matak Fontein • Fortuyn • De Fouw • Bevier de Fouw • François • Fraser • De Fremery • Frets • Freudenberg • Friesendorp • Frieswijk • Frowein • Fruin • Veltman Fruin • Fuhri • Fuhri Snethlage • Fundter • Fundter de Beauchene • Furnee

== G ==
Gaade • De Gaay • De Gaay Fortman • Gallas • Steenwijk Gallas • Gasinjet • Gastelaars • De Gavere • Gaymans • Geertsema • Busch Geertsema • Geertsema van Sjallema • Van Gelder • Smidt van Gelder • Gelderman (Zwolle) • Gelderman (Schermbeck) • Gelinck • Gelpke • Sollewijn Gelpke • Van Gelsdorp • Van Genderen • Van Gennep • Gentis • Geradts • Gericke • Gerlings • Indewey Gerlings • Jager Gerlings • Oortman Gerlings • De Pauw Gerlings • Verschoor Gerlings • Van Geuns de Geus • Gevers • Gevers Deynoot • Gevers Leuven • Gewin • Gey • Gey van Pitdus • Giesberger • Gildemeester (Rheda) • Gildemeester • Van Gheel Gildemeester (Utrecht) • Van Gilse (Alphen, Gilze) • Van Gilse (Baarle Nassau) • Gleichman • Gleichman von Oven • Gobius • Gobius du Sart • Gockinga • Goddard • Goekoop • Van Goens • van der Goes • Van Gogh • Gonggrijp • Goossens • Gordon • Van Gorkum • De Gou • Gout • Gouda • Van Gouiloever • De Graaf (Rijssel) • De Graaff (Nieuwland) • Van de Graaff • Messemaeckers van de Graaff (Bleskensgraaf) • Van de Graaff (Ned.-Indie) • Graafland (geslacht)• Hooft Graafland • De Graeff (Amsterdam) • Gransberg • Graswinckel • Gratama • Fresemann Gratama • Oldenhuis Gratama • Willinge Gratama • Gravenhorst • Bennebroek Gravenhorst • Berch Gravenhorst • Waters Gravenhorst • Gregory • Greidanus • Idema Greidanus • Van Wimersma Greidanus • Grenfell • Greve • Hovens Greve • Van Someren Greve • De Greve • Grevelink • Alstorphius Grevelink • Bisschop Grevelink • Uzenhoed Grevelink • Van Griethuijsen • Groeneveldt • De Bruine Groeneveldt • Groeninx • Groeninx van Zuelen • Van der Gronden • Brandenburg van der Gronden • Van Groningen • Cornets de Groot • De Groot • Hofstede de Groot • Groskamp • Robbe Groskamp • Grothe • Van Ghesel Grothe • Luten van Doelen Grothe • Grijp • Specht Grijp • Guepin • Guerin • Balguerie Guerin • Gülcher • Guljé • Gunning • Guyot • Van Gijn • Kuyl van Gijn • Gijsberti • Gijsberti Hodenpijl • De Gijselaar

== H ==
Van Haaften • Kivit van Haaften • Haan • de Haan • Bierens de Haan • Van Breda de Haan • Ter Haar • Hacke • Van Haeften • Van der Haer • de Haes • Hagedoorn • Rolandus Hagedoorn • Haitink • Hajenius • Halbertsma • Van der Halen • De Jonge van der Halen • Van Hall • Van Noorle van Hall • Teyler van Hall • van Halmael • Van Halteren • Hamaker • van Hamel • Ardesch van Hamel • Hamer • De Witt Hamer • Versélewel de Witt Hamer • Hamilton of Silvertonhill • Hamming • Hamstra • van Woudenberg Hamstra • Hanedoes • Hanegraaff • Hanlo • Hannema • Hardenberg • Van Harencarspel • Van Harpen • Krook van Harpen • Kuyper van Harpen • Harte • Harte van Tecklenburg • Hartevelt • Hartman • Del Campo Hartman • Hartogh • Hartogh Heys • Hartsinck • van Marselis Hartsinck • Hasebroek • Hasselaer • Hooft Hasselaer • Sautijn Hasselaer • Hasseleij • Hassleij • Hasselman • van Hasselt (Gent) • Van Hasselt • Copes van Hasselt • Abbema Copes van Hasselt • Wilhelmy van Hasselt • Havelaar • Van Heek • Van Heel • Dudok van Heel • Gousset van Heel • van Hees • Heemskerk • Bijsterus Heemskerk • Heerspink • Hegt • Noordhoek Hegt • Hein • Arendsen Hein • Vlielander Hein • Faijan Vlielander Hein • Heinsius • Van Bosveld Heinsius • van Helbergen • Helder • Heldewier • Vignon Heldewier • Heldring • Helmich • Helmolt • Camerling Helmolt • Van Heloma • Van Helsdingen • van Beuningen van Helsdingen • Von Hemert • Hendrichs • de Lestrieux Hendrichs • van Hengel • Hengst • van Hengst • Hennequin • Henny • Herckenrath • Herderschee • Heringa • Hermsen • van Herzeele • Herssevoort • Heshuysen • Hesselink • Keppel Hesselink • Van Heteren • Van Heukelom • Siegenbeek van Heukelom • Van Heusde • Van Heusden • Van den Heuvel • Van der Hagen van den Heuvel • Van den Heuvell • Van Linden van den Heuvell • van Heuven • Kiljan van Heuven • van Munster van Heuven • Heyning • Van Heyningen • Kits van Heyningen • Heijnis • Heinis • Heynsius • Van Heyst (Antwerpen) • Van Heijst (tak Waalwijk) • Van Heijst (tak Sprang) • Van Buuren van Heijst • Graevestein van Heijst • Van den Ham van Heijst • De Vries van Heijst • Hiddingh • Hingst • Hinlopen • Hintzen • van Hoboken • Appelius van Hoboken • van Hoek • de Hoest • Hoeth • Wichers Hoeth • Hoeve • Van der Hoeven (Besoijen) • van der Hoeven (Delft) • van der Hoeven (Dorsten) • des Amorie van der Hoeven • Pruys van der Hoeven • Templeman van der Hoeven • Van 't Hoff • Hoffmann • Hoffmann van Hove • Hofstede • van Hogendorp • Hogerwaard • de Lille Hogerwaard • Hojel • van Holkema • Holland • Holle • van Beest Holle • du Ry van Beest Holle • Holleman • Hollertt • Holst • Roland Holst • Holtius • Holtzman • Homan • Linthorst Homan • Hondius • Van den Honert • Honig • Van Hooff • Drijfhout van Hooff • Hooft van Vreeland • 't Hoofd • Visser 't Hoofd • Hoog • Hoogendijk • Van Rossen Hoogendijk • Van Hoogenhuyze • Hoogeveen • Hoogeweegen • Hoogewerff • Hooglandt • Palairet Hooglandt • Hoogstad • Silvergieter Hoogstad • Van Hoogstraten • Van Bijnkershoek van Hoogstraten • Hoogvliet • van der Hoop • Thomassen à Thuessink van der Hoop • Hooreman • Van Hoorn • Hoos • Van Hopbergen • Horst • Houba • Houben • Houck • Hout • van der Hout • van Houten (Elburg) • Akersloot van Houten • Van Houten (Meeden) • Van Houten (Rotterdam) • Houtman • van Houweninge • Baggerman van Houweninge • Kuyck van Houweninge • Van Houweningen • Van Hora • Hovy • Hoyack • Hoyer • Hoynck van Papendrecht • Chalmers Hoynck van Papendrecht • Van Hoytema • Hoytema van Konijnenburg • Hubar • van Hellenberg Hubar • Huber • Rosendahl Huber • Hubert • Hubrecht • van Lanschot Hubrecht • van der Hucht • Hudig • Huet • l'Ange Huet • Busken Huet • Gallandat Huet • Hugenholtz • Ter Bruggen Hugenholtz • de Haan Hugenholtz • Huidekoper • Hulsewe • Hulshoff • van Hulst • Hummelinck • Wagenaar Hummelinck • Hurgronje • Snouck Hurgronje • Huijgen • Huygens • Huygens Peronneau van Leijden • Huysinga • Huijsman • Huisman

== I ==
Van Iddekinge • Hooft van Iddekinge • Idenburg • Van Idsinga • Immink • Indewey • Ingen Housz • Insinger • De longh • Crena de Iongh • De Jongh • Crena de Jongh • Van Iterson • Van Loon van Iterson • Roessing van Iterson • Roessingh van Iterson • Itzig Heine

== J ==
S'Jacob • De Normandie s'Jacob • Jacobson • Jacobson • Rosen Jacobson • Jaeger • Van der Jagt • James • De Groot Jamin • Jannink • Janssens • de Maes Janssens • Jarman • Berkman Jarman • Jeltes • Van Jeveren • Jolles • Jonas • De Joncheere • Jonckheer • De Jong • De Josselin de Jong • van Loghem de Jong • De Jong van Rodenburgh • Van Zijll de Jong • Van der Zoo de Jong • De Jongh (Goedereede) • De Jongh (Wijk) • De Jongh van Son • De Jongh (Zaltbommel) • Munniks de Jongh • Jongkindt • Jongkindt Coninck • Jordaan • Jordan • Jordens • Jordens • Jurgens • Jurry • Juta • Jutting • Van Benthem Jutting • Van Starckenborgh Jutting

== K ==
Kaars Sypesteyn • Van Kaathoven • Kakebeeke • Peman Kakebeeke • Kalff • Fremery Kalff • Kam • Kamerling • Kamphuis • De Kanter • De Laat de Kanter • Van Karnebeek • Karsten • Van de Kasteele • De Kat • Kayser • Keiser • Brunsvelt Keiser • Busch Keiser • Tjassens Keiser • Warmolt Keiser • Van der Kemp • Van Kempen (Kalkar) • Van Kempen (Kempen) • De Kempenaer • Kemper • Kempers • Bernet Kempers • Kerkhoven • Van Kerkwijk • Kerstens • Van Kervel • Kessler • Ketjen • Willink Ketjen • Van Ketwich • Van Ketwich Verschuur • Keuchenius • Keunen • Kiderlen • Von Kiderlen-Waechter • Kingma • Kip • Van Erp Taaiman Kip • Kirchner • Hasseleij Kirchner • Kist • Kleyn (Leiningen) • Le Conge Kleyn • Kleyn (Schoonhoven) • Van der Kloot • Van Rhede van der Kloot • De Klopper • Kluit • Provb Kluit • Sautijn Kluit • Tempelman Kluit • Kluytenaar • Klijn • Knappert • Kneppelhout • Knight • Knoote • Knottenbel • Knottnerus (Bellingwolde) • Knottnerus (Eger) • Knuttel • Koch (Stein-am-Rhein) • Koch (Solingen) • De Kock • Koenen • Van Koetsveld • Van Koetsveld van Ankeren • Mengel van Koetsveld van Ankeren • Kol • Kolff • Kolff van Oosterwijk • Van Breda Kolff • Van Santen Kolff • Koning • Wittop Koning • Koningsberger • Van Konijnenburg • Hoytema van Konijnenburg • Van der Koog • Van Bijnkershoek van der Koog • Van Toulon van der Koog • Kool • Diemer Kool • Schuckink Kool • Schultze Kool • Koolen • Kolen • Coolen • Koopmans • Coopmans • Koopmans Stadnitski • Cnoop Koopmans • Van Swinden Koopmans • Kooy (Huizen) • Van Barneveld Kooy • Kooy (Uithuizen) • Van Marwijk Kooy • Van Woensel Kooy • Van der Kop • Croiset van der Kop • Kops • De Bruyn Kops • Kortenhorst • Korteweg • Kranen • Krantz • Krayenhoff • Krayenhoff van de Leur • Van Krimpen • Krol • Van Driel Krol • Kronenberg • Kroon • Krudop • Kruimel • Krull • Kruseman • Nieuwenhuijzen Kruseman • Polman Kruseman • Krusemann • De Kruijff • Kruys • Tielenius Kruythoff • Tielenius • Van Kuffeler • De Blocq van Kuffeler • Van der Meer van Kuffeler • Kuhn • Ter Kuile • Ter Kuile Lemker • Kuiper • Frenstra Kuiper • Van der Kun • Kuntze • Kuyck • Van Kuyk • De Kuyper • Kuyper • Van Harpen Kuyper • Kymmell • Homan Kymmell • Lunsingh Kymmell • Nijsingh Kymmell • Oldenhuis Kymmell • Willinge Kymmell • Wilmsonn Kymmell

== L ==
Laan (Middelie) • Laan (Westwoud) • Laane • Van de Laar • Labouchere • Labrijn • Tak Labrijn • Ladenius • Toe Laer • Lagers • Lamaison van Heenvliet • Lamberts • Lambrechtsen • Lambrechtsen van Ritthem • Laming • Land(geslacht) • Lange • Everwijn Lange • De Lange • Ten Houte de Lange • Stuyling(h) de Lange • Tigler de Lange • Van Lansberge • Van Lanschot • Lantsheer • Laurillard • Laurillard dit Fallot • Laurman • Laverge • Lebret • Lechner • Van Pelt Lechner • Leclercq • Van Lede • Ledeboer • Leemans • Leembruggen • Leendertz • Van Leenhof • Van Leenhof de Lespierre • Leesberg • Van der Leeuw (Rotterdam) • Van der Looy van der Leeuw • Van der Leeuw (Stevensweert) • Van Leeuwen (Nederhemert) • De Kock van Leeuwen • Van Leeuwen (Nieuwkoop) • Van Leeuwen (Schipluiden) • Storm van Leeuwen • Van Leeuwen • Van Leeuwen van Duivenbode • Lehman de Lehnsfeld • Ruijsch Lehman de Lehnsfeld • Lels • Lely • Van der Lely • Van Lelyveld • Van Lelyveld van Cingelshouck • Le Mair • Van Lennep • Roeters van Lennep • Ross van Lennep • Lenshoek • Lette • Lhoest • Lichtenbergh • Van der Burcht van Lichtenbergh • Van Lidth de Jeude • Lieftinck • Van Lilaar • De Lind van Wijngaarden • Van der Linden • Dronsberg van der Linden • Cort van der Linden • De Lint • De Lind van Wijngaarden • Lisman • Loder • Loeff (Oudheusden) • Loeff (Zaltbommel) • Loeff (Zeeland) • Van der Loeff • Rutgers van der Loeff • Schim van der Loeff • Verniers van der Loeff • Van Loenen • Beckeringh van Loenen • Lohman • Lohnis • Loman • Van Loo • Sluyterman van Loo • Van de Loo • Van der Loo • Loopuyt • De Loos • Neuman de Loos • Loosjes • Looxma • Los • Los van Aarlanderveen • Loudon • Lucardie • Lucassen • Valck Lucassen • Luchtmans • Luden • de Bie Luden • Lugard • Lugt • Van der Lugt • Lulofs • Drossaart Lulofs • Luns • Van Lutterveld • Van Luttervelt • Luzac • Lycklama a Nijeholt

== M ==
Maaldrink • Binkhorst Maaldrink • Van Maanen • Maas (rivier) • Maas Geesteranus • Van Maasdijk • Macalester Loup • Mac Gillavry • Mackay • MacLeod • Madry • Magnee • Maielle • Maingay • De Man • Nolthenius de Man • Van der Mandele • Van der Mandere • Van Manen • Mansholt • Van Mansvelt • Marcella • Maris • Van Marken (Baambrugge) • Van Marken (eiland Marken) • Vos van Marken • Van Marle • Marres • Martini Buys • Mathijsen • Mathon • Van Schaeck Mathon • Matthes (Beieren) • Van Lankeren Matthes • Matthes (Brandenburg) • Mauritz • Mazel • Van der Meersch • Van Limborch van der Meersch • Van Meerten • Meertens • Mangelaar Meertens • Mees • Alting Mees • Dorhout Mees • Kreunen Mees • Mom Faure Mees • Uniken Mees • De Meester • Meesters • Tromp Meesters • Van Meeteren • Westerouen van Meeteren • Van Meeverden • Menalda • Mensonides • Mercier • Merckelbach • Merckens • Merens • Gallis Merens • Van der Mersch • Mertz • Messchaert • Messchert • Mestingh • Metelerkamp • Methorst • Metzlar • Ter Meulen • Ruhle von Lilienstern ter Meulen • Meurs • Dalen Meurs • Meursinge • De Mey • Meijen • Van Stuyvesant Meijen • Meijer • De Lanoy Meijer • Maarschalk Meijer • Meyer • Meyer Timmerman Thijssen • De Meijier • Meyjes • Van Oostrom Meyjes • Posthumus Meyjes • Meijlink • Meyners • Van Mierlo • Van Mierop • Schenkenberg van Mierop • Milders • Minderop • Van der Minne • Mirandolle • Mispelblom • Mispelblom Beyer • De Mist • Uitenhage de Mist • Modderman • Moens • Isebree Moens • Moes • Molengraaff • Van Hoogen Molengraaff • Molengraaff van Loon • Molewater • Moll (Blokzijl) • Moll (Wageningen) • De Bruyn de Neve Moll • Van Moll • Mollinger • De Mol van Otterloo • Moltzer • Momma • De Monchy • Monod de Froideville • Montijn • Moolenburgh • Moorrees • Van Braam Morris • Van de Mortel • Mosselmans • Van Motman • Motz • Pelgrom von Motz • Van Mourik • Mouthaan • Mouton • Delia Mouton • Van der Muelen • Zur Muhlen • Mulier / Haitsma Mulier • Muller (Gerolsheim) • Muller van Voorst • Müller • Muller (Glarus) • Muller (Grijpskerk) • Du Celliee Muller • Muller (Sleeswijk-Holstein) • Wolterbeek Muller • Muller Massis • De Munnick • Muntendam • Muntz • Van Musschenbroek • Mutsaerts • Muijsken • Mijnssen • Verpyck Mijnssen

== N ==
Van Naamen • Nachenius • De Bijll Nachenius • Nagel • Nagtglas • Nagtglas Versteeg • Nairac • Nauta • Nederburgh • Nepveu • Nepveu tot Ameyde • Roosmale Nepveu • De Neree • De Neree tot Babberich • Van Nes • Van Nes van Meerkerk • Netscher • van der Gon Netscjer • De Neufville • Van Gelder de Neufville • Neys • Nibbrig • Hart Nibbrig • Niemeijer • Van der Niepoort • Nierstrasz • Nieuwenhuis • Domela Nieuwenhuis • Domela Nieuwenhuis Nyegaard • Domela • Nieuwenhuijs • Nieuwenkamp • Kits Nieuwenkamp • Van Nieuwkuyk • Nilant • Van Nispen • Noëls van Wageningen • Nolen • Nolthenius • Tutein Nolthenius • Brown Tutein Nolthenius • Noodt • Huber Noorduyn • Noorduyn • Van Nooten • Cambier van Nooten • Hoola van Nooten • Sandt van Nooten • Sibmacher van Nooten • Nortier • Van Notten • Van Nouhuys • Losecaat van Nouhuys • Noyon • Terpstra Noyon • Numan • Star Numan • Nijgh • Nijhoff • Nypels • Nysingh

== O ==
Obreen • Van der Speck Obreen • De Vrij Obreen • Odé • Offerhaus • Van Ogtrop • Van Olden • Van Oldenborgh • Van Ommeren • Onderwater • De Court Onderwater • Ongerboer • Onnes • Kamerlingh Onnes • Van Oordt • Bleuland van Oordt • Van der Houven van Oordt • Oorthuys • Oosterbaan • Oosterhoff • Van Gybland Oosterhoff • Van Oosterzee • Oosting • Bieruma Oosting • Van Oppen • Van Opstall • Van Orsoy de Flines • Van Osselen • De Mol van Otterloo • Ouboter • De Bruyn Ouboter • Oudemans • Van der Oudermeulen • Van Outeren • Van Oven • von Oven • Van Overveldt • Van Overzee • Van Oyen • Vorsterman van Oyen • Von Oyen zu Furstenstein • Oijens • De Marez Oijens • Weckherlin de Marez Oijens

== P ==
Paehlig • Paets • Pahud de Mortanges • Pahud • van der Pals • van Gilse van der Pals • Palthe, Racer Palthe, van Wulfften Palthe • Pape • Paravicini di Capelli • Parve • Steyn Parve • Pasteur • Pastor • Patijn • Clotterbooke Patijn • Paulus • Paulussen • de Pauly • Pauw • Pelerin • Pelinck • Ter Pelkwijk • Peltzer • Penning • Penning Nieuwland • Pennink • van Hanswijk Pennink • Perk • Perk van Lith • van Persijn • van Peski • Pfeiffer • Pfister • de Wetstein Pfister • Phaff • Philippi • Philips (familie)• Philipse • Piccardt • Soetbrood Piccardt • Pichot • Pichot du Plessis • Pichot Lespinasse • Picke • Piek • Pierson • Pietermaat • Pigeaud • Piper (patriciërsgeslacht) • Pistorius (Oberhessen) • Verkerk Pistorius • Pistorius (Thuringen) • Pit • Plate • Plaat • Plemp • Plemp van Duiveland • Pleyte • Pleyte d'Ailly • van der Ploeg • Ploos van Amstel • Pluygers • Pol • Hulshoff Pol • Pols • Polvliet • Nederdijk Polvliet • Pompe • Pont • Maclaine Pont • Le Poole • Van der Poorten • Portielje • van der Pot • Povel • Praetorius • Prager • van Prehn • van Prehn Wiese • Prince • Prins (Aalten) • Prins (Noordwijk) • Prins (Rotterdam) • Prins (De Rijp) • Prins • Bloys van Treslong Prins • Pronck • Van de Putte • Fransen van de Putte • Pijnacker Hordijk

== Q ==
Quack • De Quay • Du Quesne • du Quesne van Bruchem • Queysen • Quien • Quintus

== R ==
Raedt • Raedt van Oldenbarnevelt • Arendsen Raedt • Ragay • Rahder • Rahusen • De Ram • Ramaer • Rambonnet • De Ranitz • Ras • Rasch • Rau • Rauwenhoff • De Ravallet • Ravesteijn • Van Ravesteyn • Receveur • Reddingius • Benthem Reddingius • Folmer Reddingius • Lubeley Reddingius • Roskamp Reddingius • Van Reede • Van Reenen • Reepmaker • Reepmaker van Belle • Rees • Van Rees • Siewertsz van Reesema • Reeser • Reeser Cuperus • Regout • Rehm • Reiger • a Brakel Reiger • Remy • Repelius • Reuchlin • Reyers • Reynvaan • Van Rhijn • Ribbius • De Riemer • Van Riemsdijk • Van Riemsdijk Kreenen • Du Rieu • Rink • Van Rinkhuyzen • Rive • Robbe • De Vries Robbe • De Rochefort • Rochussen • Roelants • Roelants van Baronaigien • Jonker Roelants • Hazelhoff Roelfzema • Röell • Roelofsz • Roelvink • Roessingh • Roessingh Udink • De Buys Roessingh • Conringh Roessingh • Roest • Roest van Limburg • Van Roggen • Graadt van Roggen • Rolandus • Roldanus • Rombach • Romeny • Ter Haar Romeny • Rommenie • • Von Römer • Romme • Van Romondt • d'Aumale van Romondt • Romswinckel • De Roo (Bailleul) • De Roo (Delft) • De Roo de la Faille • Roodenburg • Rooseboom • Roosegaarde • Roosegaarde Bisschop • Roosenburg • Rose • Roskes • Van Rossem • Van Rossum (Asch) • Van Rossum (Zaltbommel) • Rost van Tonningen • Rouffaer • De Roy • De Roy van Zuydewijn • De Roy van Wichen • Royaards • Van Erpers Royaards • Sutherland Royaards • Van Royen (Berlikum) • Van Royen (Breukelerveen) • Van Roijen (Ieper) • Haakma van Roijen • Roijer • Rueb • Russel • Rutgers • De Ruuk • Ruys ('s-Hertogenbosch) • Ruijs de Beerenbrouck • Ruys van Nieuwenbroeck • Ruijs • Ruys (Utrecht) • Ruys van Hoogh-Schaerwoude • Ruys de Perez • Nienhuis Ruys • Rijcken • Pels Rijcken • Van Rijckevorsel • Van Rijn (Papendrecht) • Rijnbende • Van Bol'es Rijnbende • Rijshouwer

== S ==
De la Sabloniere • De Lussanet de la Sabloniere • Saint Martin • Saltet • Van der Sande • Van der Sande Lacoste • Verbeek van der Sande • Sander • Duyckinck Sander • Van Sandick • Sannes • Van Santen • Santhagens • Van Eibergen Santhagens • Sark • Sas • Sassen • Schaay • Schade van Westrum • Schadee • Schaepkens • Schaepkens van Riempst • Schaepman • Schafer • Schalkwijk • Schaly • Scharp • Schas • Scheers • Scheidius • Van Schelle • Scheltema • Scheltema Beduin • Scheltema de Heere • Adama van Scheltema • Van Scheltinga • De Blocq van Scheltinga • Coehoorn van Scheltinga • Wielinga van Scheltinga • Scheltus • Scheltus van IJsseldijk • Van Schelven • Schenck • Teengs Schenck • Schepel • De Schepper • IJssel de Schepper • Schermer • Schermer Voest • Van Scherpenberg • Scheurleer • Lunsingh Scheurleer • Schiff • Van Schilfgaarde • Schill • Schimmel • Schuurman Schimmel • Schimmelpenninck • Schippers • Schleicher • Schlingemann • Schluiter • De la Fontaine Schluiter • D' Outrein Schluiter • Schneiders van Greyffenswerth • Schober • Schoch • Schokker • Arkenbout Schokker • Scholten (Almelo) • Scholten (Holten) • Scholten (Osnabruck) • Scholten van Aschat • Fannius Scholten • Scholten van Oud-Haarlem • Van Wesele Scholten • Scholten (Wezel) • Scholvinck • Schonegevel • Van Nijmegen Schonegevel • Van Schoonhoven • Van der Schooren • Schout Velthuys • Schouwenburg • De Jong Schouwenburg • Van Schouwenburg • Menalda van Schouwenburg • Schram • Schrameier Verbrugge • Van Schreven • Van der Schrieck • Schukking • Schuller • Bosschaert Schuller • Schuller tot Peursum • Van der Werven Schuller • Schultz van Haegen • Schuurman • Elink Schuurman • Elink Schuurman Duuring • Schuyt • Van Castricum • Schwartz (Morbegno) • Schwartz (Posen) • Van Loben Sels • Senders • Senn van Basel • Mersen Senn van Basel • Servatius • Sibinga • Smit Sibinga • Vietor Sibinga • Sichterman • Sieburgh • Siemens • Siertsema • Sillem • Simon Thomas • De Sitter • Sleeswijk • Wegener Sleeswijk • Sleurs • Slicher • Sligcher • Slingeland • Van Oosten Slingeland • Van Slooten • Slotemaker • Van Sloterdijck • Sluis • Sluiter • Sluyterman (Dokkum) • Sluyterman (Leeuwarden) • Van Slijpe • Smallenburg • Smalt • Smidt • Smith • Smits (Schoonhoven) • Smits • Smits van Eckart • Smits van Hattert • Smits van Oyen • Smulders • Snellen • Snethlage • Snoeck • Snoeck van Tol • Van Reijn Snoeck • Snouck van Loosen • Snijder • Snijder van Wissenkerke • Snijders • Van Son • Van Braam van Son • Roberts van Son • De Sonnaville • Van Sonsbeeck • Verheye van Sonsbeeck • Van Sorgen • Van Spaendonck • Spakler van der Masch Spaendonck • Spandaw • Spengler • Cox van Spengler • Spiering • Ter Spill • Boelmans ter Spill • Spree • Sprenger • Van der Sprenkel • Berkelbach van der Sprenkel • Spruyt • Staal • Courrech Staal • van der Staal • Van der Staal van Piershil • Van de Stadt • Stahl • Staring • Van Staveren • Van Steeden • Van den Steen • Van den Steen van Ommeren • Steenberg • Steenberghe • Van Steenis • Van Steennis • Steenkamp • Steenlack • Steins Bisschop • Stern • Van Oostenwijk Stern • Sterneberg • Steveninck • De Ruyter van Steveninck • Van Steijn • Van Steijn van Hensbroek • Stheeman • Talma Stheeman • Stigter • Van Stipriaan • Van Stipriaan Luiscius • Von Stockhausen • Van Stockum • Van Stokkum (Gorinchem) • Van Stockum (Hamburg) • Van der Stok • Stokhuyzen • Stolk • Van Stolk • Stols • Stoop • De Stoppelaar • Stork • Storm de Grave • Storms • Stratenus • Strens • Stroink • Strootman • Van Strijen • Stuart • Verrijn Stuart • Suermondt • Kamphuis Suermondt • Tabingh Suermondt • Suringar • Valckenier Suringar • Suijck • Van Bemmel Suijck • Swaan • De Roon Swaan • Swaving • Sweerts de Landas • Swellengrebel • Van Swijndregt • Montauban van Swijndregt • Swijser • Sypesteyn • Kaars Sypesteyn • Sypkens • Benthem Sypkens

== T ==
Tack • de Brueys Tack • Tak (Etten) • Tak van Poortvliet • Dumon Tak • Tak (Zierikzee) • De Maret Tak • Tasman • Tassel • Taunay • Teengs • Teeuwen • Tegelberg • Telders • Tellegen • Temminck • Tengbergen (Doetinchem) • Tengbergen (Gendringen) • De Bruyn Tengbergen • Van Ebbenhorst Tengbergen • Termijtelen • Terwindt • Testas • De Famars Testas • Van Tetering • Tetrode • Van Tets • Tetterode • den Tex • Den Tex Bondt • Van Teylingen • Thesingh • Geraerds Thesingh • Thiange • Thieme • Van Eldik Thieme • Weenink Thieme • Thierens ('s-Gravenhage) • Thierens (Land van Waas) • Thoden van Velzen • Thomson • Thooft • Thorbecke • De Thouars • Le Vasseur de Congnee de Thouars • Thurkow • Thijssen • Heerkens Thijssen • Tichelman • Tideman • Strumphler Tideman • Tielenius Kruijthoff • Tielens • Van Tienhoven • Van Tienhoven van den Bogaard • Tilanus • Van der Hoop Tilanus • Tilman • Titsingh • Camper Titsingh • Tjassens • Dittlof Tjassens • Tjeenk • Leuveling Tjeenk • De Bie Leuveling Tjeenk • Tol • Van Linden Tol • Des Tombe • Van Tomputte • Tonckens • Lunsingh Tonckens • Oldenhuis Tonckens • Toussaint • Steenstra Toussaint • Tra Kranen • Van Taack Tra Kranen • Trenité • Nolst Trenité • Tresling • Bosman Tresling • Haakma Tresling • Lunsingh Tresling • Ruardi Tresling • Stheeman Tresling • Wintgens Tresling • Treub • Van Tricht • Trip • Sibenius Trip • Tromp • Tromp van Holst • Troostwijk • Doude van Troostwijk • Tuckermann • Turing • Twiss • Duymaer van Twist • Van Eck Duymaer van Twist • Tydeman • Van Tyen

== U ==
Ubachs • Van Uchelen • Croiset van Uchelen • Uhlenbeck • Uitterdijk • Umbgrove • Van Lulofs Umbgrove van Uije

== V ==
Vader • Saaymans Vader • Van Voorst Vader • Vaillant • Valck • Veen Valck • Valeton • Van der Valk • Van Valkenburg (Land van Valkenburg) • Van Valkenburg (Valkenburg, Lb.) • Van Valkenburg (Well) • De Vassy • Veder • Veeckens • Van Heemskerck Veeckens • Zegers Veeckens • de Veer • Van West de Veer • Veeren • Van Orsoij Veeren • Van Veeren • Van der Ven • Verbrugge • Verhagen • De Jong Verhagen • Van Bleijswijk Thierens Verhagen • Verhellouw • Verheijen • Verkade • Verkouteren • Verloop • Van Noordenne Verloop • Verloren • Ver Loren • De Monte ver Loren • Vermande • Vermeer • Losecaat Vermeer • Vermande • Vernhout • Verploegh • Verploegh Chasse • Verschoor (Mechelen) • Verschoor van Nisse • Verschoor (Sleeuwijk) • 't Hooft Verschoor • Verschuir • Fontein Verschuir • Forsten Verschuir • Van Gesseler Verschuir • Versfelt • Verspyck • Baert Verspyck • Versteeven • Verster • Versteeven de Balbian • De Balbian Versteeven • Verstolk • Veth • Giltay Veth • Vethacke • Vethake • De Veye • Swanenburg de Veye • De Veye de Burine • De Vicq • Van Bredehoff de Vicq • Van Bredehoff de Vicq van Oosthuizen • De Vidal de Saint Germain • Viehoff • Viëtor • Fresemann Vietor • Vigelius • Vinkhuizen • Vinkhuyzen • De Virieu • Viruly • Van Castrop Viruly • Viruly van Pouderoyen • Viruly Verbrugge • Vis (Oost-Zaan) • Vis • Vis Bolderdijk (Zaandijk) • Van Romondt Vis (Colijnsplaat) • Visch • Mom Visch • Visscher • Visser • Visser (Schiedam) • Visser (Sluis) • De Visser • Scharp de Visser • Ongerboer de Visser • Vissering • Van Hoorn Vissering • Van Visvliet • Vitringa • Van Gelein Vitringa • Van Vladeracken • De Vlaming • Vliegenthart • Vlielander • Vlierboom • Van der Vliet • Van Vlissingen • Fentener van Vlissingen • Van Tongeren van Vlissingen • Van Vloten • Van Bommel van Vloten • Van Braam van Vloten • Stael van Holstein van Vloten • Vogel • Anthing Vogel • De Vogel • Vogelaar • Völcker • Verstolk Völcker • Vollenhoven • Van Beeck Vollenhoven • Van Vollenhoven • Messchert van Vlissingen • Van der Poorten van Vlissingen • Snellen van Vlissingen • Van der Wallen van Vlissingen • Voller • Peereboom Voller • Vollgraff • Vonk • Van der Veen Vonk • Voorduin • Voorhoeve • Voorhoeve Holland • Van der Voort • Rouppe van der Voort • Van Voorthuysen • Van Eyk van Voorthuysen • Du Marchie van Voorthuysen • Vorstman • De Vos (Hamm) • De Vos • De Vos tot Nederveen Cappel (Düsseldorf-Kaiserswerth) • Vosmaer • Van Voss • Heerma van Voss • Voûte • Vreede • De Vries (Friesland) • De Vries (Rossum) • De Vries (Zaandam) • Ten Cate de Vries • De Vriese (Drenthe) • de Vriese (Tholen) • Vriesendorp • Vroe • Bijl de Vroe • Van der Vijver de Visch Eijbergen

== W ==
De Waal • Wachter • De Wael • Vos de Wael • Van Wageningen • Noëls van Wageningen • Van Driel van Wageningen • Waghto • De Wal • Van Walchren • Waldeck • Walen • Jannette Walen • Van de Wall (Arnhem) • Van de Wall (Gendt) • Von de Wall • Von Dewall • Walland • Van der Wallen • Waller • Van Walre • Van Walree • Van Walsem • Van Walsum • Van Cappellen van Walsum • Walter • Wambersie • Van Waning • Wap • Van Warmelo • Warnaars • Warnsinck • Staats Evers Warnsinck • Toe Water • Van Waterschoot van der Gracht • Van Wayenburg • Van Weel • De Clercq van Weel • Weerman • Weerts • Welter • Wendelaar • De Wendt • Wentholt • Ten Behm Wentholt • Van de Werk • Wertheim • Wertheim Aijmes • Wertheim van Heukelom • Wery • Van Wessem • Westenberg • Coninck Westenberg • Lincklaen Westenberg • Westendorp • Westenenk • Westerman • Westermann • Sargant Westermann • Westerwoudt • Westra • Westra van Hoithe • Willemier Westra • Van Westrheene • Weve • Weyn • Wichers • Van Aldringa Wichers • Van Buttingha Wichers • Eyssonius Wichers • Lamoraal Wichers • Ruardi Wichers • Wieling • Wierdsma • Rypperda Wierdsma • Wichers • Wierdsma • Wilbrenninck • Wilde • Wildervanck • Wildschut • De Wildt • Bosboom de Wildt • Wilkens (Bremen) • Wilkens (Nordhorn) • Willet • Willeumier • Ter Bruggen Willeumier • Van Willigen • Kleyn van Willigen • Van der Willigen • Willinck • Willinge • Willink • Willink van Collen • Tjeenk Willink • Winckel • Von Winckel • Wintgens • Wisboom • Wiselius • De Wit (Kamerijk) • Dudok de Wit • De Wit (De Rijp) • Duyvené de Wit • De With • Van Haersma de With • Witsen • Wittert • Wittert van Hoogland • Van Woelderen • Woldringh • Wolf • Barkey Wolf • De Wolff van Westerrode • Van Wolframsdorff • Wolterbeek • Wttewaall • Woppermann • Wurfbain • Fockema Wurfbain • Wijers • Wyers • Wijnaendts • Wijnaendts van Resandt • Van Wijngaarden • Wijnmalen • Wijs • De Wijs (Amsterdam) • De Wijs (Utrecht)

== Y ==
Ypeij • IJske • Van IJsselsteyn • Van IJzendoorn

== Z ==
Zaal • Zaaijer • Zeewoldt • Van Alphen Zeewoldt • Berthon Zeewoldt • Zubli • De Clercq Zubli • Tatum Zubli • Van Zuylen van Nijevelt • Zwartendijk • Zweerts • Van Zwijndregt • Zijnen • Van der Hegge Zijnen • Sibmacher Zijnen • Steens Zijnen • Vrijdag Zijnen • Van Zijp • Van der Voort van Zijp • Van Zijst
