= Stedelijk Museum Amsterdam =

Art museum in Amsterdam, Netherlands

- Logo of the museum since 23 September 2012

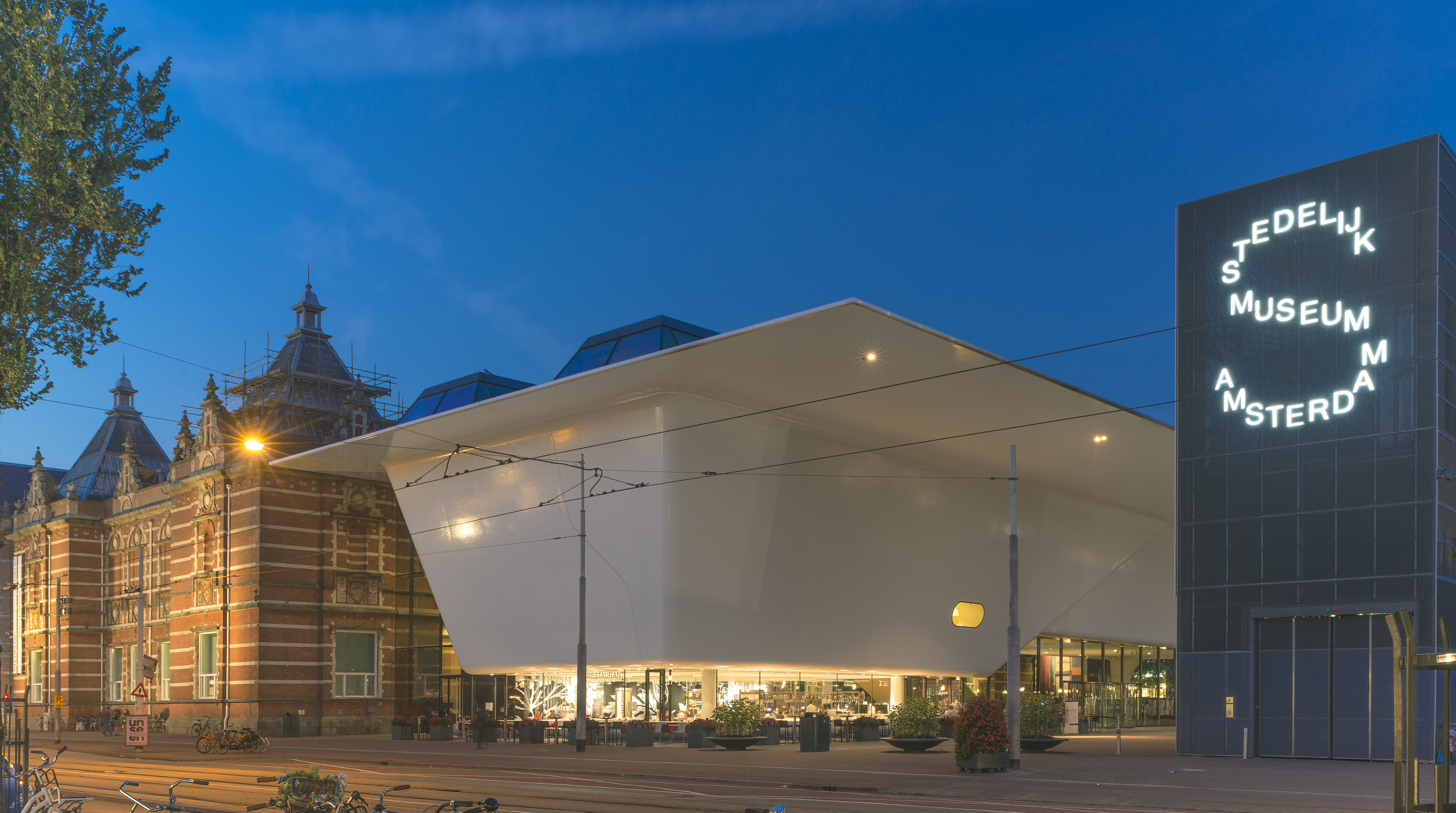
- Stedelijk Museum Amsterdam, 2013

- Location within the city of Amsterdam
- Established: 1874
- Location: Museumplein 10; Amsterdam, Netherlands
- Coordinates: 52°21′29″N 4°52′47″E
- Type: Modern art, contemporary art
- Collection size: 90,000 items
- Visitors: 603,675 (2023)
- Director: Rein Wolfs
- Public transit access: Tram: 2 , 5 , 12; Bus: 170, 172
- Website: www.stedelijk.nl

The Stedelijk Museum Amsterdam (Dutch pronunciation: [ˈsteːdələk myˈzeːjʏm ˌɑmstərˈdɑm]; Municipal Museum Amsterdam), colloquially known as the Stedelijk, is a museum for modern art, contemporary art, and design located in Amsterdam, Netherlands.

The 19th-century building was designed by Adriaan Willem Weissman. The connecting 21st-century wing, which houses the current entrance, was designed by Benthem Crouwel Architects. The museum is located at the Museum Square in the borough Amsterdam South, where it is close to the Van Gogh Museum, the Rijksmuseum, and the Concertgebouw.

The collection comprises modern and contemporary art and design from the early 20th century up to the present day. It features artists such as Vincent van Gogh, Wassily Kandinsky, Ernst Ludwig Kirchner, Marc Chagall, Henri Matisse, Jackson Pollock, Karel Appel, Andy Warhol, Willem de Kooning, Marlene Dumas, Lucio Fontana, and Gilbert & George.

In 2024, the museum had an estimated 574,000 visitors. Its 2024 budget was around €37 million, and counted around 200 members of staff.

== History ==
=== 19th century ===
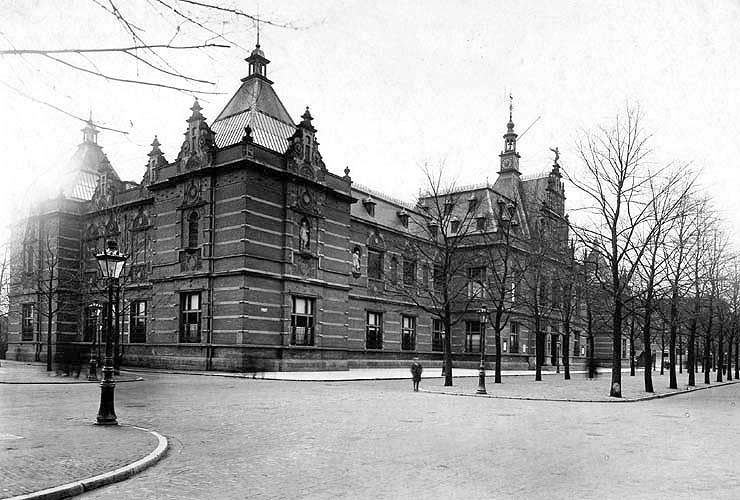
The old building of the Stedelijk Museum was opened in 1895

The Stedelijk Museum, Amsterdam, opened on 14 September 1895 as an initiative of the local authority and private individuals. The Dutch Neo-Renaissance style museum building was designed by Dutch architect Adriaan Willem Weissman as part of a modernization project spearheaded by local citizens starting in 1850. The construction of the building was largely funded by Sophia Adriana de Bruyn. Specifically, it was built under the patronage of the Vereeniging tot het Vormen van een Verzameling van Hedendaagsche Kunst (VVHK, 'Society for the formation of a public collection of contemporary art'). The society has been founded in 1874 to house de Bruyn's collection of art and antiques that she donated to the city along with a considerable sum of money. The Van Eeghen family of bankers also contributed to the construction costs and donated paintings from the collection of Christiaan Pieter van Eeghen.

The building was constructed between 1891 and 1895 at Paulus Potterstraat, a short walking distance from the Rijksmuseum. The museum's original collection included militaria of the Amsterdam militia, Asiatic art, and artifacts from the Museum of Chronometry and the Medical-Pharmaceutical Museum.

=== 20th century ===
In 1905, Cornelis Baard was appointed curator of the Stedelijk and promoted to museum director in 1920. During his time as curator, the local authority began building its own collection of modern art. However, the Great Depression in the Netherlands led to municipal cutbacks and an increased need for policy reviews in the first half of the 1930s. In 1932, a purchasing committee was established with two members from the VVHK and two from the local authority. These four figures oversaw all art purchases for the museum, notably works of Hague and Amsterdam Impressionism and pieces by international contemporaries.

The museum began actively acquiring art in 1930. In 1933, M.B.B. Nijkerk's collection of books came to the Stedelijk; the focus of museum would later expand to include book design and typography. The Museum of Applied Art opened on the ground floor of the west wing on 15 December 1934. This collection included furniture, glass, pottery, and china, graphic design and posters, textiles, small sculptures and masks, batik, metalwork, and stained glass with an emphasis on Dutch work from around the turn of the century.

In 1936, David Röell, who had previously worked at the Rijksmuseum and was secretary of the VVHK, took over as museum director. Röell appointed Willem Sandberg as the new curator in January 1938. Sandberg eventually took over as director of the museum in 1945. By 1962, the VVHK handed over most of its collection, including works by George Hendrik Breitner, Paul Cézanne, Jean-Baptiste-Camille Corot, Gustave Courbet, Vincent van Gogh, and Johan Jongkind.

Sandberg's direction show a radical expansion in the collecting policy of the Stedelijk. A department of applied art was instigated in 1945 and a department of prints and drawings in 1954. At the start of 1950, the Stedelijk also began to present modern music. In 1952, it became host to the newly established Nederlands Filmmuseum, and started showing films. The annex known as the Sandberg Wing was built in 1954 to accommodate experimental art. By 1956, a reading room, print room, a museum restaurant and garden, and a new auditorium for film screenings and musical performances were added.

In the same year, Sandberg began acquiring photography for the museum's collection; the Stedelijk was the first western European museum for modern art to collect photography. The collection includes seminal photographers of both the Dutch and international avant-garde in the interbellum period (such as Erwin Blumenfeld, László Moholy-Nagy and Man Ray), an extensive selection of post-war Dutch photographers (including Eva Besnyö, Ed van der Elsken and Cas Oorthuys), artist portraits, photojournalism, and autonomous fine art photography from the 1970s onward.

During World War II, the Stedelijk collection and that of the Amsterdam Museum were transferred for safekeeping to a bunker in the sand-hills near Santpoort. Museum staff took turns keeping watch. Sandberg narrowly managed to evade arrest: in 1943, when a German search party was sent to apprehend him, Sandberg fled by bicycle into the dunes. Despite the upheavals of war, the Stedelijk continued to hold exhibitions.

Works by Ernst Ludwig Kirchner and Henri Matisse were added to the collection at the end of the 1940s and 1950s. During this time, the Stedelijk also acquired artworks by De Stijl and related international movements such as Russian Constructivism and Bauhaus. Sandberg acquired a group of works by Russian artist Kazimir Malevich in 1958, giving it the largest collection of Malevich works outside Russia.

Dutch newsreels about guidances via hearing devices, 1952

Edy de Wilde, who had run the Van Abbe Museum in Eindhoven, took over as director from 1963 to 1985. He began the first collection of American contemporary art at the Stedelijk. Under his direction, in 1971, debates about the museum's social and educational functions sparked the formation of a communications department. In the early 1970s, the museum made its first acquisitions of video art by European artists including Jan Dibbets and Gilbert & George. By 2024, the collection of video art had expanded to around 900 works and installations, including works by Nam June Paik, Bill Viola and Bruce Nauman.

By the mid-1970s, after the last period rooms were closed, the Stedelijk became exclusively a museum for modern art. In 1975 the Stedelijk even purchased Henk Jurriaans as living artwork, but only for one hour per day for one month.

=== 21st century ===
In 2001, drawings by Kazimir Malevich and other Russian avant-garde artists from the collection of the Khardzhiev-Chaga Cultural Centre were added to the museum's collection of Ukrainian/Russian/Soviet art.

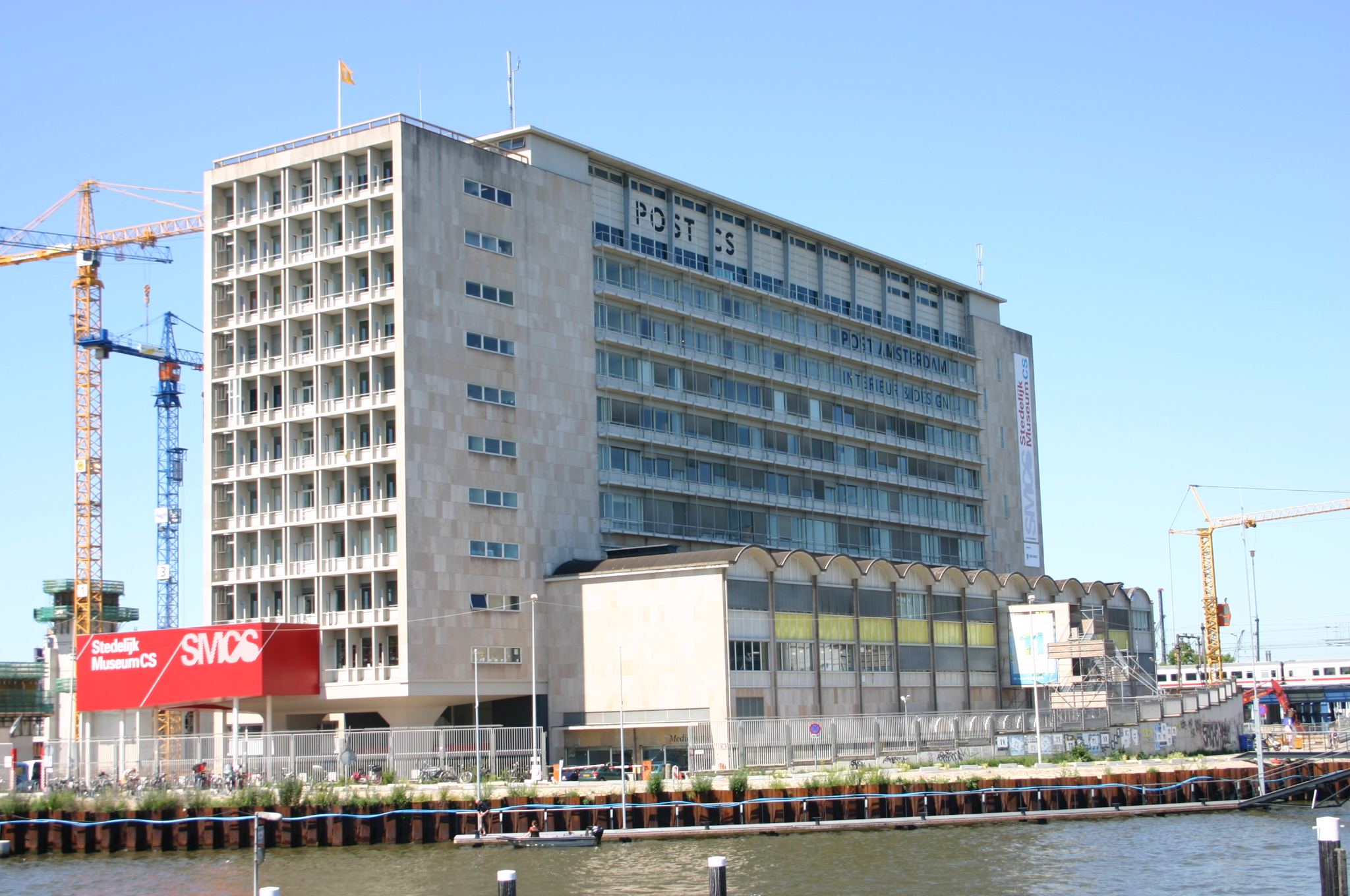
Temporary location of the Stedelijk Museum in the building Post CS

At the end of 2003, the Adriaan Willem Weissman building was closed at the insistence of the fire department; renovation work began. The Stedelijk took up temporary residence in the old Post CS Building, where it would remain for 4 and a half years. In 2005, the museum established a partnership with The Broere Charitable Foundation; on behalf of the Monique Zajfen Collection, the museum acquired contemporary European artworks, which were placed at the museum on long-term loan. In 2006, debates and lectures were organized in the context of the exhibition 'Mapping the City', which explored the relationship of artists to the city. Space was created called the 'Docking Station' for monthly presentations of work by emerging artists. In 2008, 'Other voices, other rooms', an exhibition highlighting the video work of Andy Warhol, drew 600,000 visitors.

In 2006, the city council removed the Stedelijk from the direct control of the council, and it became part of a foundation. The museum thus became a more businesslike enterprise that leases the museum building from the city and, on behalf of the council, mounts exhibitions and manages, maintains, and adds to the municipal collection.

Starting in late 2008, the Stedelijk underwent major construction. As a consequence, the museum started the "Stedelijk goes to Town" project to maintain a visual presence within the city of Amsterdam while the building was being renovated. The project ran until the latter half of 2009 and featured a series of workshops, lectures, and presentations in various locations throughout Amsterdam.

Logo of the new Stedelijk Museum.

From August 2010 until January 2011, the Stedelijk Museum opened its doors with a unique program called "The Temporary Stedelijk" in the restored, yet unfinished historical building. After welcoming 'art, artists and the public' back through its doors, the Stedelijk continued with this temporary program. "The Temporary Stedelijk 2" opened in March 2011 and focused on the renowned collection of modern and contemporary art and design. The exhibition showcased the breadth of the museum's collection and exhibited works by Piet Mondrian, Kazimir Malevich, Charley Toorop, Henri Matisse, Donald Judd, Willem de Kooning, Yves Klein and Bruce Nauman, among others. Selections from the collections were presented on a rotating basis. "The Temporary Stedelijk 3" began in October 2011 and featured exhibitions, presentations, and activities located throughout Amsterdam.

The museum reopened for the general public on 23 September 2012 with the group show "Beyond Imagination". Artists included in this inaugural show were James Beckett, Eric Bell and Kristoffer Frick, Rossella Biscotti, Eglé Budvytyté, Jeremiah Day, Christian Friedrich, Sara van der Heide, Suchan Kinoshita, Susanne Kriemann, Matthew Lutz-Kinoy, Snejanka Mihaylova, Rory Pilgrim, Falke Pisano, Julika Rudelius, Fiona Tan, Jennifer Tee, Jan van Toorn, Vincent Vulsma and Andros Zins-Browne. In the first month after the reopening, the museum had over 95,000 visitors.

== Collection ==
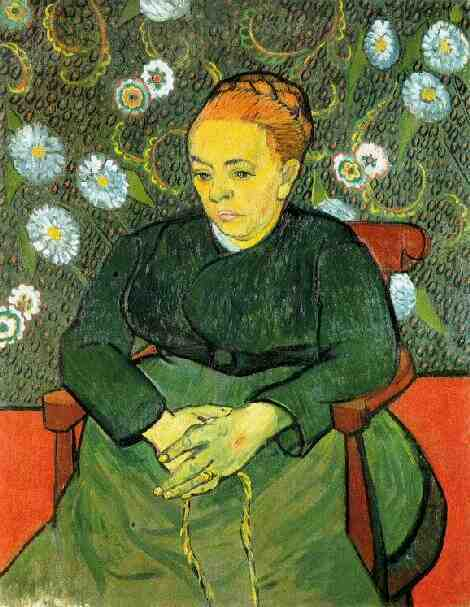
La Berceuse (1889) by Vincent van Gogh

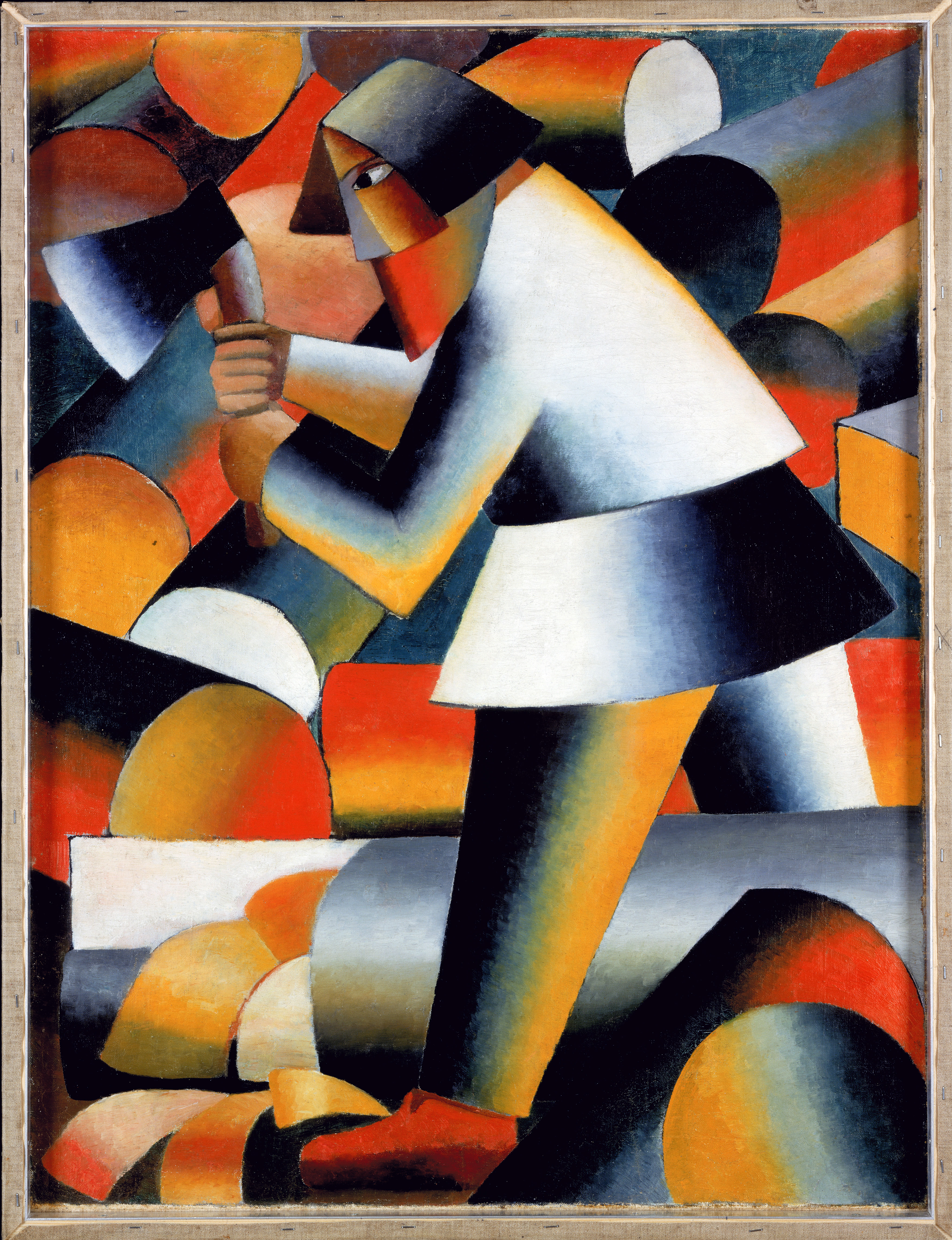
Woodcutter (1912–13) by Kazimir Malevich

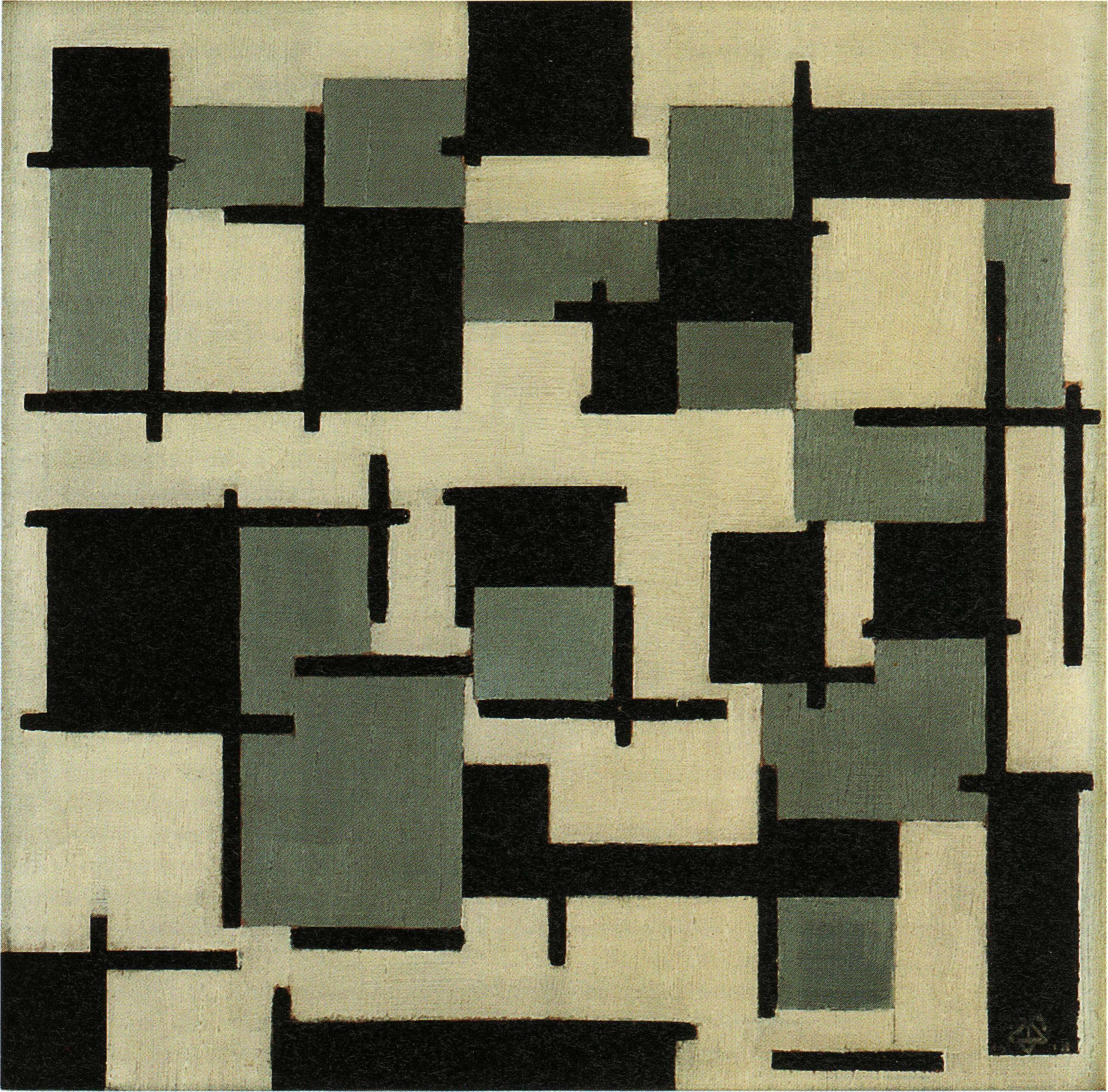
Composition XIII (1918) by Theo van Doesburg

The museum collection holds almost 90,000 objects, collected since 1874. With important clusters and cores focusing on De Stijl, Bauhaus, Pop Art and CoBrA and, more recently, Neo-Impressionism, the collection represents virtually every significant movement in art and design of the 20th and 21st centuries. The Stedelijk also has a comprehensive collection of drawings and paintings by Kazimir Malevich. Key pieces by Post-Impressionists Paul Cézanne and Vincent van Gogh exemplify art from the late 19th century. The collection is sub-divided into the following disciplines:

- Painting
- Sculpture
- Installation
- Moving image and sound
- Prints and drawings
- Posters
- Photography
- Graphic design
- Industrial design
- Artist books
- Lucebert archive

In early 2010, the Stedelijk Museum partnered up with design agency Fabrique and augmented reality firm Layar to develop virtual art tours called "ARtours". Using smartphone technology, visitors are treated to additional stories and images about the collection both inside the museum and outside around the city. In the final phase of this project at the end of 2011, the public was invited to add their own stories, images, and other information through the open source platform.

In 2018, a mural created by Keith Haring in 1986 on the Stedelijk Museum's storage facility was revealed after being covered by sheets of aluminum a few years after its completion. The 40-foot-mural is the artist's largest public work and was created for his first solo museum exhibition.

=== Digitization ===
In November 2009, the museum started a project to digitize its historical archive, which spans from 1895 to 1980. The archive contains around 1.5 million documents in around 7,000 folders, and includes correspondence letters of the director and buyer records. Ownership of the documents has been officially transferred to the Amsterdam City Archive, but the documents will remain in the Stedelijk Museum until the digitization project is completed.

== Vandalism and theft of collections ==
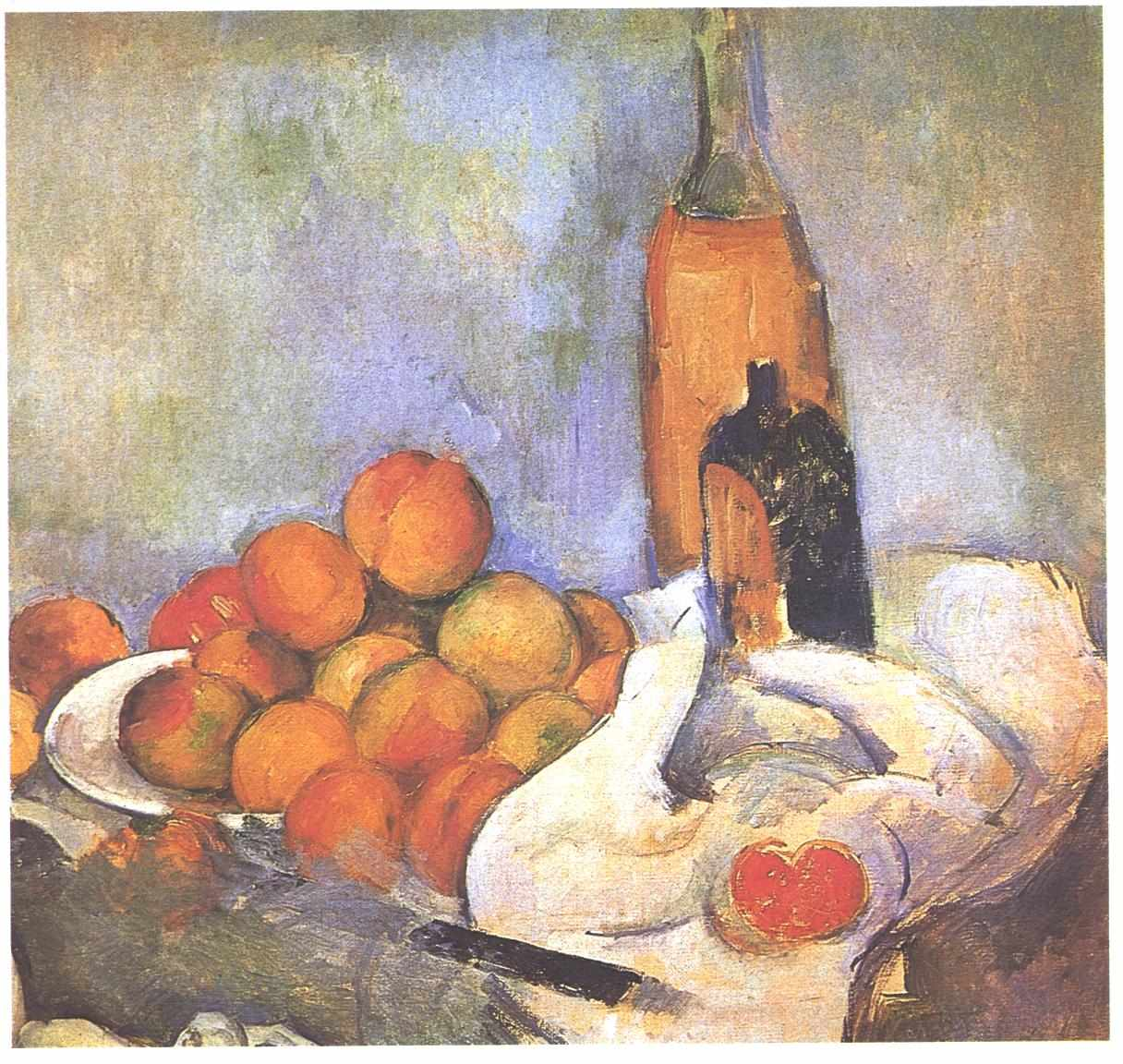
Still life with bottles and apples by Paul Cézanne was stolen in 1988

On 21 March 1986, Gerard Jan van Bladeren cut the painting Who's Afraid of Red, Yellow and Blue III (1967) by Barnett Newman with a utility knife during a psychotic episode. He was sentenced to eight months in jail and two years probation, and was banned from the museum for three years. On 21 November 1997, Van Bladeren, the same vandal, cut the painting Cathedra (1951), also by Barnett Newman. In court, he pleaded insanity and was not convicted, but was banned from the museum permanently.

On 20 May 1988, the first and only art theft from the Stedelijk took place. The three paintings Vase with Carnations (1886) by Vincent van Gogh, Street in Nevers (1874) by Johan Jongkind, and Still life with bottles and apples by Paul Cézanne were stolen during a break-in. On 31 May 1988, all three paintings were recovered undamaged by police pretending to be buyers. The thief was arrested and convicted.

On 15 May 2011, AFC Ajax's victory in the national competition was celebrated at the Museum Square. During the celebration, supporters damaged the Benthem Crouwel Wing's rooftop and glass panels, resulting in €400,000 of damage and prompting a change in venue to the Amsterdam Arena for the celebration of AFC Ajax's subsequent 2012 victory. Despite these issues, the city government of Amsterdam has stated that it will still consider using the Museum Square as a potential location for large events.

== Weissman Building ==
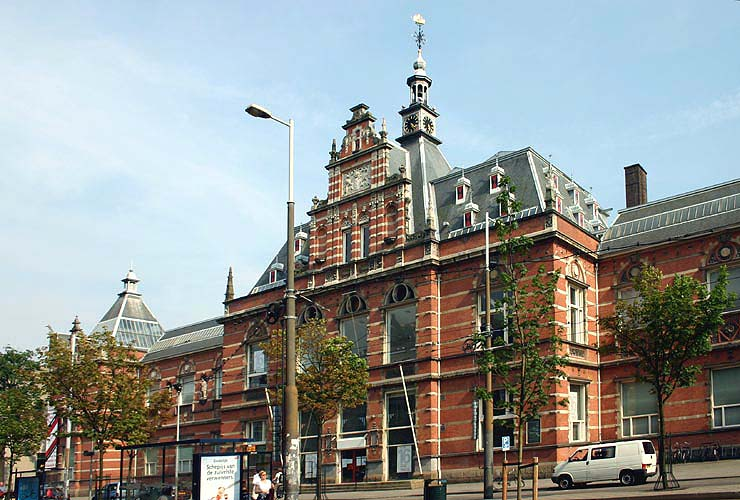
The façade of the Weissman building

Dutch architect Adriaan Willem Weissman designed the building for the Stedelijk in 1895. The design of the upper façade and tower – a combination of pale stone and red brick – gave the exterior of the building a 16th-century Dutch look. In 1934, director Cornelis Baard ordered that the loggia above the museum's main entrance to be converted into an exhibition space and had several galleries repainted in light colours. When Röell took over in 1936, he installed light wall coverings inside some of the galleries and had new doorways put in on the upper-floor galleries. Then, in 1938, Röell had the polychrome staircase whitewashed and replaced the yellow glass in the skylight with lime-washed glass. In 1938, the then curator Willem Sandberg had the interior walls covered in white jute, creating an early forerunner of 'white cube' gallery spaces. Some years later, in 1954, Sandberg had the opportunity to build a largely glass extension flanking the Van Baerlestraat, which came to be referred to as the "Sandberg Wing". Sandberg also replaced the museum's heavy, rather uninviting doors with a glass entrance.

== Temporary relocation and addition of Benthem Crouwel Wing ==
By the 1990s, the lack of modern facilities within the museum was becoming desperate. In particular a lack of climate control, and a gallery space unable to feature the highlights of the collection on permanent display. Since its beginnings, over a century earlier, the collection had vastly increased. The art depots and workshops had also become far too cramped. In 1993, a leak in the roof of the museum damaged several large paintings, among them pieces by Ellsworth Kelly and Julian Schnabel.

A competition to renovate the museum was first held in the early 1990s, with Robert Venturi beating Rem Koolhaas, Wim Quist, and Carel Weeber to the job. Venturi was replaced by the Portuguese architect Álvaro Siza Vieira in 1996 but approval for Vieira's design (by the Amsterdam council) only came six years later after severe modifications to the design.

The approval for Vieira's plans came at a time of even larger upheaval. The museum had commissioned a report on its current position. The resulting document ('Terug naar de Top': 'Back to the Top') was highly critical of the museum and its architectural direction. "The conservation and administration of its collection was inadequate, the building was in a deplorable state, management left a lot to be desired, there was a total lack of vision, and the museum was plagued by a structural shortage of political support and financial resources." The report's authors considered that the Portuguese architect's plans lacked "a clear vision and aspiration for the Stedelijk Museum and a specific programme of requirements based on that, drawn up with the assistance of the expertise and knowledge of the staff."

As the management of the Stedelijk discussed how best to proceed with the recommendations, the old building was forced to close in January 2004 when it no longer complied with fire regulations. The Stedelijk was temporarily relocated to the Post-CS building, an old building of the Postal Service close to the Amsterdam Central Station. When the Post-CS location was closed in 2008, a book called "Stedelijk Museum CS – Prospect/Retrospect" was published to commemorate some of the successful expositions and artists during this period, such as Andy Warhol and Rineke Dijkstra.

=== Benthem Crouwel Wing ===
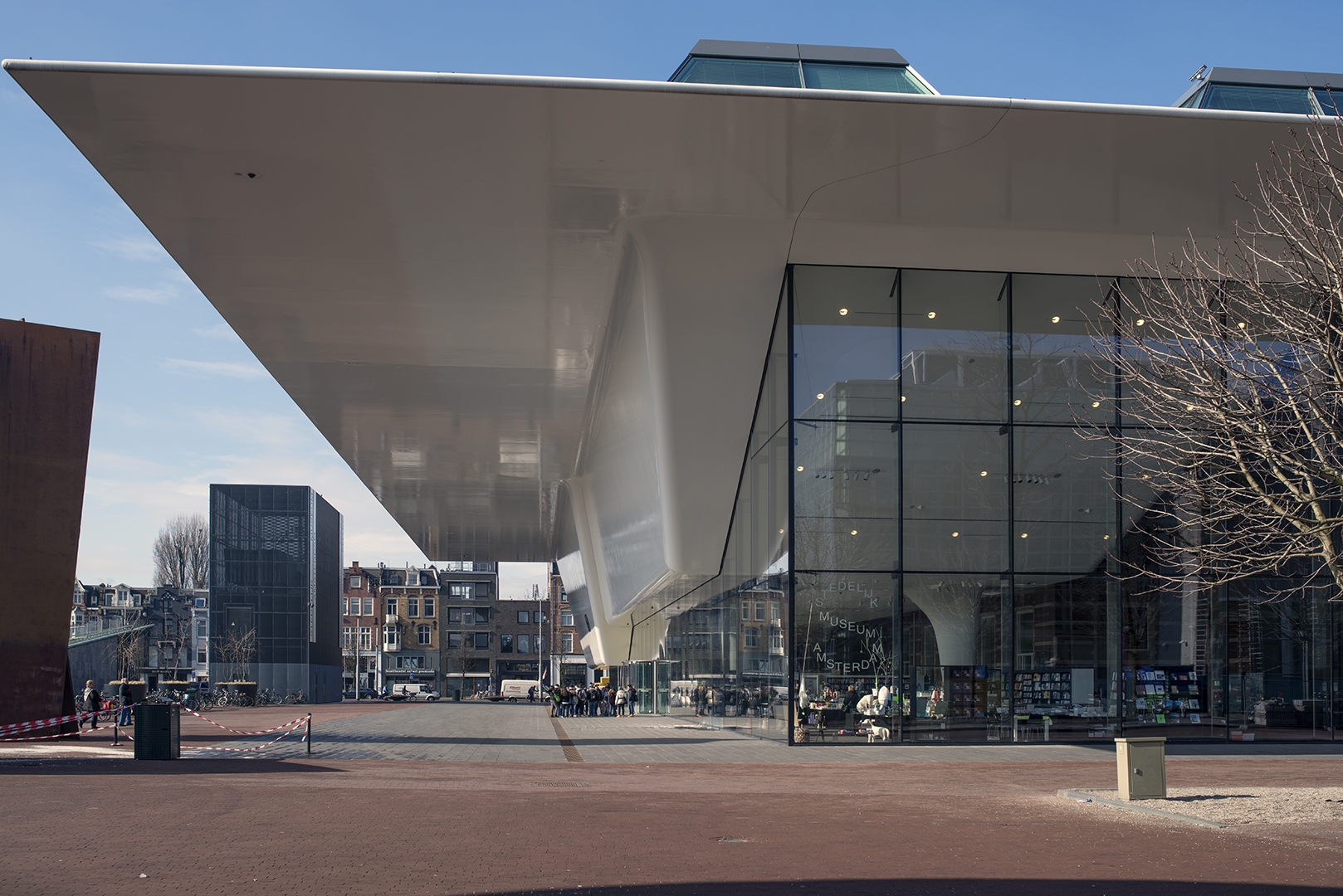
The new wing and entrance of the museum in 2013

Following the cancellation of the collaboration with Vieira (and also further discussions about whether to relocate the contemporary art museum to an Amsterdam park), a new programme of requirements for the renovation of the building was established. A new jury eventually awarded Benthem Crouwel Architects the renovation and construction contract for their design for the new building, which would soon be referred to as "The Bathtub".

When Alvaro Siza had originally designed the plans, the reopening was scheduled for 2007. Soon after the new competition was held, it became clear that this date was not achievable. In 2006, the Sandberg Wing as demolished; a year later construction started on the new renovation. Although the renovated original building was completed in early 2010, conditions were not suitable for exhibiting artworks because there was no climate control system, which was to be installed in the new wing. The press poured criticism on the delays. A campaign by Dutch cultural entrepreneur Otto Nan, "Stedelijk Do Something", urged people to text their disappointment about the delays. This drew considerable media attention and a huge response from social networking sites like Twitter and Facebook. Nan hoped that what he referred to as an "amicable coup" would attract political attention with an occupation of Museum Square. By sending SMS messages, people could raise money to help the museum re-launch a little sooner. With even more delays in 2011 when contractor Midreth went bankrupt, the plan to re-open in the spring of 2010 was moved to 2012. The restored original building went ahead and opened with a temporary exposition in 2010, which attracted about 223,000 visitors.

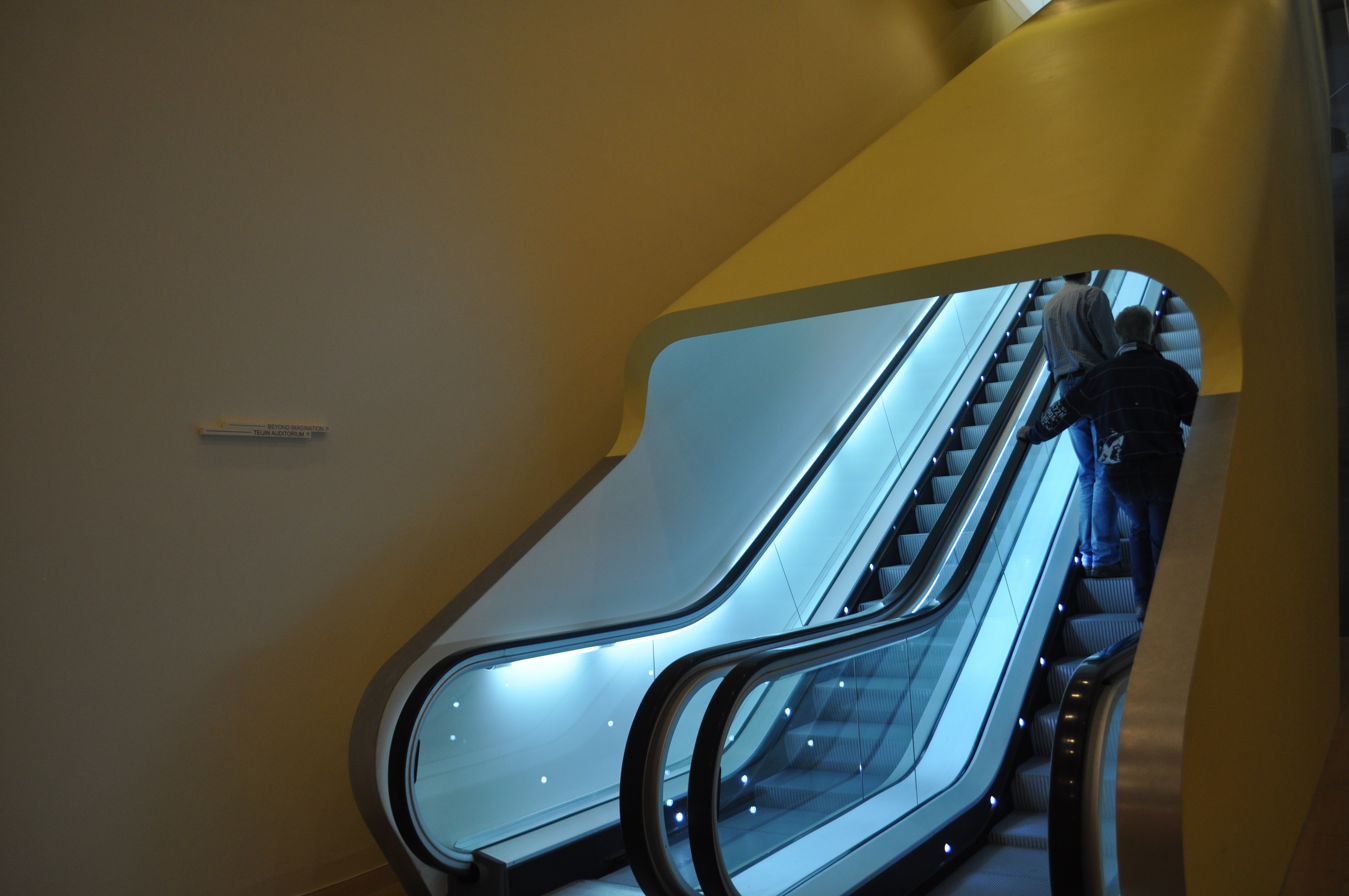
The enclosed escalator inside the museum leads from the basement directly to the top floor in 2012

Contractor VolkerWessels finished the construction in February 2012, after which the climate control system was set up. After eight years of work, the new Stedelijk opened on 23 September 2012.

The new Stedelijk has an exhibition surface area of 8,000 square meters, which is double its previous gallery space. Michael Kimmelman, architecture critic for The New York Times, wrote of the museum's addition, "I can't recall seeing a more ridiculous looking building than the new Stedelijk Museum." The Los Angeles Times called the extension "oversized, antiseptic and mismatched".

With the renovation and expansion, the highlights of the collection are on display in the old building in a series of changing presentations. The new wing consists of a large glassed entrance, which opens onto the Museum Square, and galleries for temporary exhibitions on the upper level and in the basement. It also houses the museum shop, restaurant and library, as well as an auditorium. The inaugural exhibition, entitled "Beyond Imagination", was a show of work by emerging Amsterdam artists. A retrospective of the late Los Angeles artist Mike Kelley followed in December 2012.

The completion of the project cost a total of €127M, €20M more than estimated in 2007, which was mostly funded by Amsterdam's city council.

== Visual identity ==
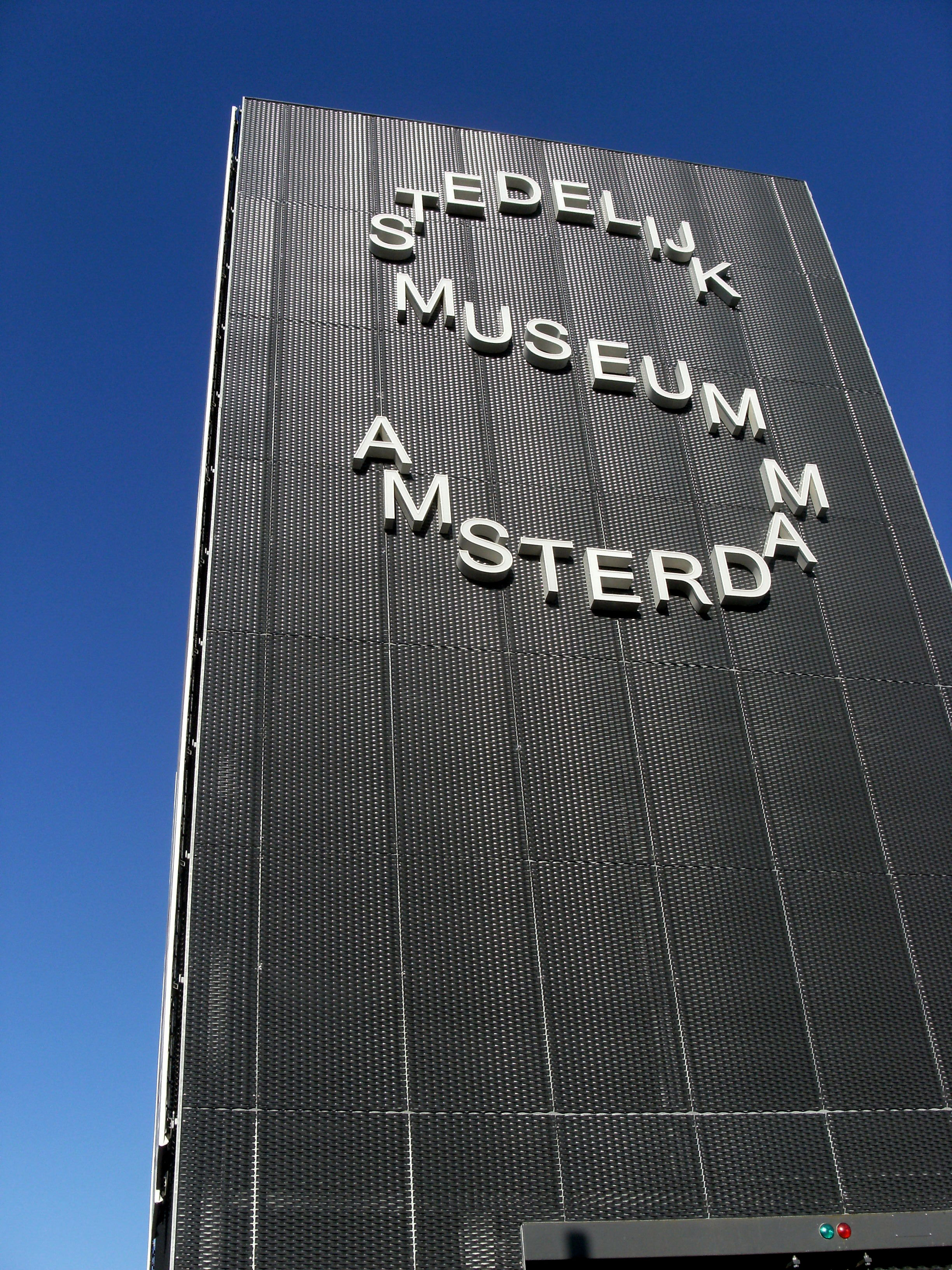
The museum logo on the building exterior in 2013

In 1963, Wim Crouwel and his design company, Total Design, began working for the Stedelijk Museum under the new director Eduard de Wilde. Crouwel designed catalogues, invitations, posters, and brochures using a consistent grid. He wanted to standardize the typography using the Univers typeface since it has the same x height on every weight. This grid-like layout became known as the SM-design style.

Armand Mevis and Linda van Deursen redesigned the logo and visual identity of the museum in 2012, which was unveiled with its re-opening on 23 September 2012. Mevis and van Deursen had previously designed the graphic identity of the temporary Stedelijk program from 2010 to 2012. The main aspect of the new logo was a large sans-serif S that is composed of the letters of the museum's name in capital letters. The typeface used is Union, a hybrid of Helvetica and Arial, created by Czech typographer Radim Peško in 2009. Union is used for all of the museum's interior and exterior signage and additional materials and resources. The new logo visual identity was controversial at first, especially since Wim Crouwel's original logo was widely admired and influential.

== Organization ==
Year	Visitors
2004	130,500
2005	197,900
2006	200,324
2007	223,411
2008	152,103
2009	closed
2010	closed
2011	138,720 (est.)
2012	300,000 (est.)
2013	700,000
2014	816,396
2015	675,000 (est.)
2016	654,776
2017	691,851
2018	703,455
2019	667,447
2020	277,338
2021	200,000 (est)
2022	444,000 (est)
2023	603,675
2024	574,244

Originally a municipal body, the Stedelijk Museum Amsterdam became a foundation on 1 January 2006, and is accountable to a supervisory board.

Visitor numbers have grown rapidly since the start of the twenty-first century, particularly following the renovation. The museum had 138,720 visitors in 2011 and 300,000 visitors in 2012. In the first twelve months after the reopening in September 2012, the museum had 750,000 visitors. By 2013, the museum had 700,000 visitors: it was the 4th most visited museum in the Netherlands, after the Rijksmuseum, Van Gogh Museum, and Anne Frank House, and the 87th most visited art museum worldwide that year. In 2014 and 2015, the museum had respectively 816,396 and 675,000 visitors. The Covid-19 pandemic saw numbers fall. By 2024, the museum had recovered to over half a million visitors.

=== Directors ===
- Jan Eduard van Someren Brand (1895–1906)
- Cornelis Baard (1906–1936)
- David Röell (1936–1945)
- Willem Sandberg (1945–1963)
- Edy de Wilde (1963–1985)
- Wim Beeren (1985–1993)
- Rudi Fuchs (1993–2003)
- Hans van Beers (2003–2005)
- Gijs van Tuyl (2005–2009)
- Ann Goldstein (2010–2013; the last year as artistic director only)
- Karin van Gilst (2013–2017; as business director)
- Beatrix Ruf (2014–2017; as artistic director)
- Rein Wolfs (1 December 2019–10 July 2027; artistic director)
- Jacqueline Bongartz (2019 – 2022; business director)
- Margot Gerené (since 2023; business director)
- Krist Gruijthuijsen (from 10 July 2027; artistic director)

=== Notable Exhibitions ===
- MARINA ABRAMOVIĆ: Exhibition – Mar 16 to Jul 14, 2024
- Anselm Kiefer: SAG MIR WO DIE BLUMEN SIND – Exhibition – Mar 7 to Jun 9, 2025

== See also ==
- List of design museums
- List of largest art museums
