= Fentener van Vlissingen =

Dutch entrepreneurial family

- family
- Country: Netherlands
- Founded: 17th century
- Founder: Gerrit Oloffsz. van Vlissingen

Fentener van Vlissingen is a Dutch patrician dynasty of entrepreneurs.

== History ==
Gerrit Oloffsz. van Vlissingen, a blacksmith living in Utrecht in the early 17th century, is the oldest known ancestor. Originating from Utrecht, the family of Lutheran descent became known for being merchants of wine, wool and honey. The family was also known for its involvement in the brick-making and brewing industries. The family soon built interests in factories and began trading. In 1896, the family founded the SHV, which dealt in coal, oil, gas, and scrap metal. It has since diversified its interests into shipping and retail.

In 1968 the seventh generation of the family founded wholesale self-service store chain Makro. The Fentener van Vlissingen family is one of the richest families in the Netherlands. Dutch magazine Quote has estimated the family's total wealth to be about €11.2 billion.

== Notable members ==
- Frits Fentener van Vlissingen (1882–1962)
- Jan Fentener van Vlissingen (1893–1978)
- Hein Fentener van Vlissingen (1921–1994)
- Frits Fentener van Vlissingen (1933-2006)
- John Fentener van Vlissingen (1939–2025)
- Paul Fentener van Vlissingen (1941–2006)
- Annemiek Fentener van Vlissingen (b. 1961)
