= Van Maanen (family) =

- family
- Country: Netherlands
- Founded: 17th century
- Founder: Wouter van Maanen

Van Maanen / Van Manen is the name of a Dutch patrician family, originating in the Duchy of Guelders. The family takes its name from the town of Manen, situated south of the city of Ede in the province of Gelderland.

== History ==
The oldest known family ancestor is Wouter van Maanen, who was born around 1625. His great-grandson Cornelis (1708 – 1742) was a lawyer and the first of several jurists from this protestant family. During the 18th and 19th centuries, the family also produced politicians, scientists, medics and clergymen.

The most prominent member of the family was Cornelis Felix van Maanen (1769 – 1849), who served as a Minister of Justice under King Louis I and King William I, and then became a Minister of State. Cornelis Felix played an important role in the codification of Dutch law. His great-grandson was astronomer Adriaan van Maanen (1864 – 1952), the discoverer of Van Maanen's Star. The lunar crater Van Maanen was also named after Adriaan.

The genealogy of the Van Maanen family was published in the first edition of Nederland's Patriciaat in 1910, a book series containing the genealogies of Dutch patrician families.

== Coat of arms ==
The central emblem of the Van Maanen coat of arms is a blue shield with three silver crescents. The crest is a silver crescent and the mantling is blue, lined with silver.

== Notable members ==
- Cornelis Felix van Maanen (1769 – 1846), Minister of Justice under King Louis I and King William I, Minister of State
- Pieter Jacob van Maanen (1770 – 1854), Professor of Medicine at the University of Harderwijk and the University of Amsterdam, Personal Physician of King Louis I
- Guillaume Adrien Gérard van Maanen (1801 – 1871), Attorney General at the Supreme Court of the Netherlands
- Marie van Maanen (1864 – 1937), Journalist
- Adriaan van Maanen (1884 – 1946), Astronomer, discoverer of Van Maanen's Star

== Gallery ==
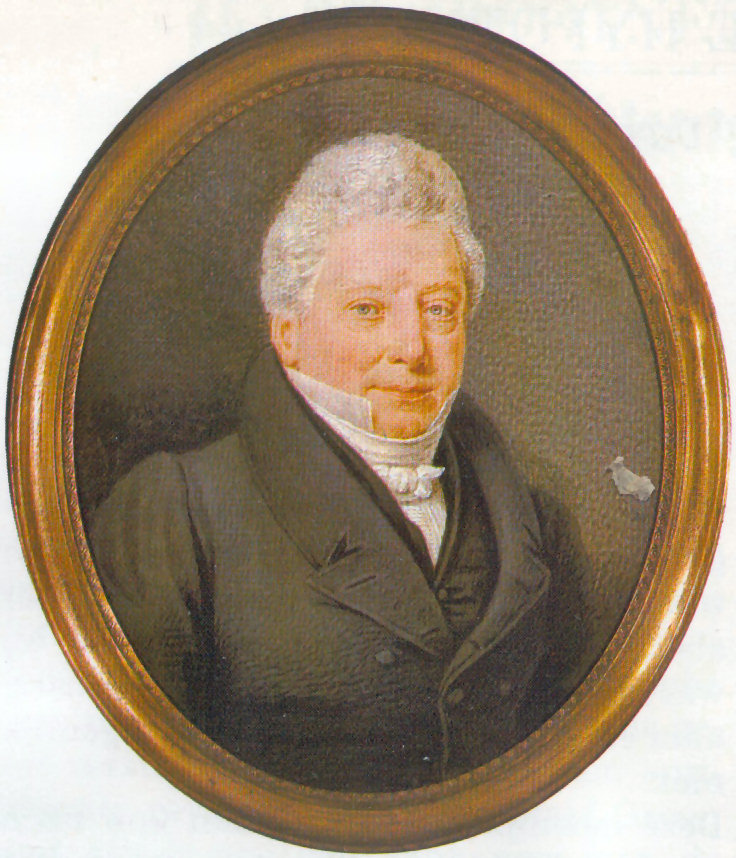
Cornelis Felix van Maanen (1769–1846), Gemeentemuseum Den Haag, ca. 1830.

== Literature ==
- (in Dutch) AA, A.J. van der, Biographisch Woordenboek der Nederlanden, Deel 12, pp. 2–10. Haarlem: J.J. Brederode, 1864.
- (in Dutch) Nederland's Patriciaat, Deel 1, pp. 267–275. The Hague: Centraal Bureau voor Genealogie en Heraldiek, 1910.
- (in Dutch) Kok, G. Chr., In dienst van het recht. Uit de geschiedenis van het gerechtshof te 's-Gravenhage en de daaraan voorafgegane hoven (1428-heden). Hilversum: Verloren, 2005.
