= Acket =

Acket (Dutch pronunciation: [ˈɑkɛt]) is a Dutch Patrician surname. Outside of the Netherlands, it is also prevalent in France. It is also proposed that it may originate as a variant of the Norse surname Acutt.

Notable people with this surname include:

- Désiré Acket (1905–1987), Belgian painter
- Gerard Adriaan Acket (born 1935), Dutch engineer
