= Dirkzwager =

Dutch Patrician Family

- Dutch patrician family
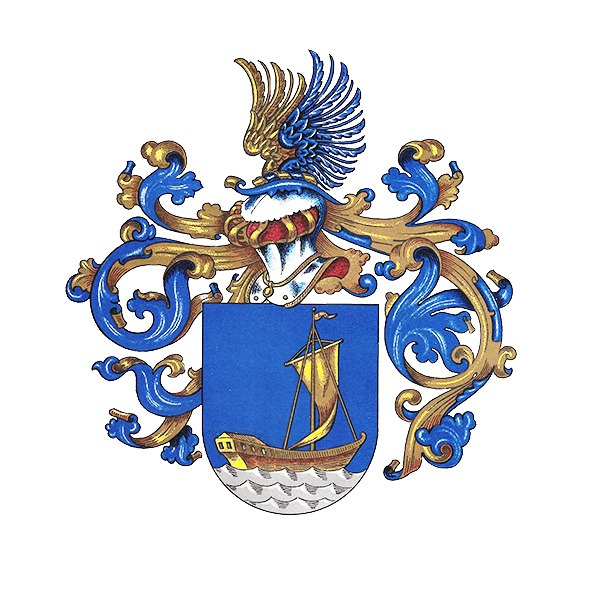
- Coat of arms with the herring buss
- Country: Netherlands
- Current region: Netherlands; United States (Minnesota)
- Earlier spellings: Derckswaeger; Derick Swager; Dirkze Zwaeger; Dirckswaegher; Dirckswaeger; Dirckswagher; Dirkz. Swager, Dirks Swager; Dirk Swager, Dircxswager; Dirxswager; Dirxwager, Dirckzwagher; Dirckswager; Dirk swaager; Dirkswager; Dirkswager; Dirk Zwaager; Dirkzwaager
- Etymology: Fusion of the patronymic Dirkszoon (Son of Dirk) and zwager (brother in law)
- Origin: South Holland
- Founded: First documentation in 1544, the dates used by the foundation is 1490 (estimated birthdate of first known family member)
- Traditions: Dutch Reformed
- Heirlooms: Oorijzer of Dirkje Dirkzwager
- Cadet branches: List of branches: Schiedam Branch; Maassluis Branch; Oud-Beijerland Branch; Rozenburg Branch (†); Moordrecht Branch
- Website: stichting-dirkzwager.nl

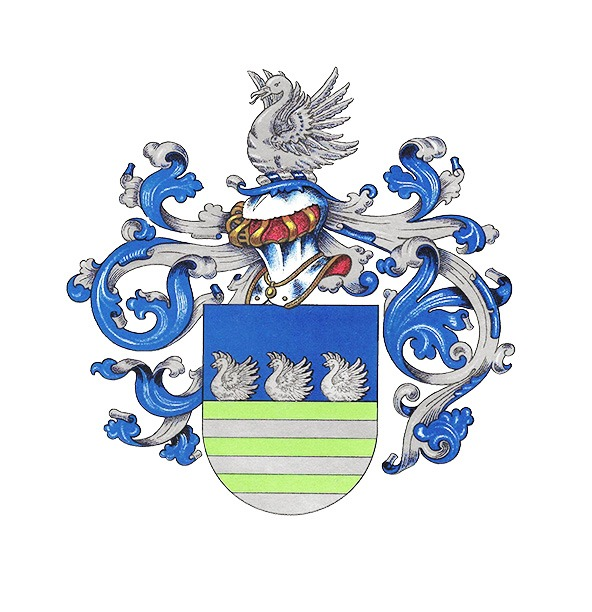
Coat of arms 1: "The coat of arms with the swans".

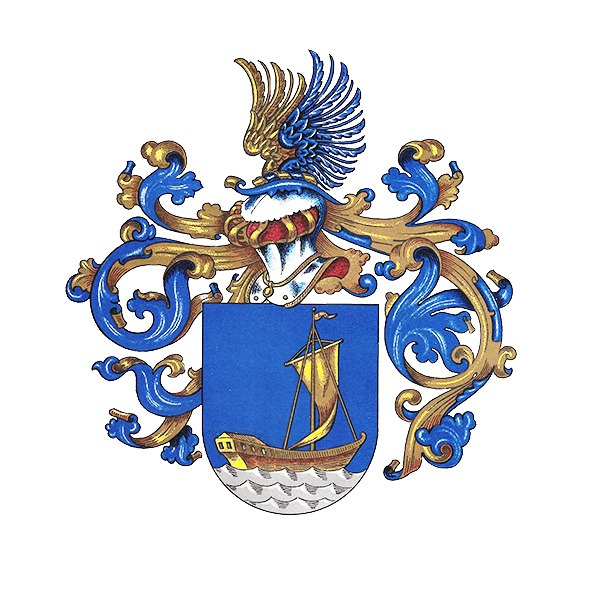
Coat of arms 2: "The coat of arms with the herring buss".

Dirkzwager (American branch: Dirkswager) is a Dutch patrician family, dating back to at least the 15th century. The family produced merchants, government officials, lawyers (vice-)consuls, judges, and bankers, among others.

== History ==
The family starts with a certain Dircx, whose name can be deduced from the patronymic of his son Cornelis Dircxzoon Zwager (1485 - 1557), the first known member of the Dirkzwager family. Whether he too already carried the surname or addition ‘Zwager’ or whether only his son was referred to with it (by virtue of a family relationship) has - in the absence of further data - never been able to be determined.

Cornelis is found in the ‘Cohier van de X^{e} penning van Zegwaard A^{o} 1544"’ where he is mentioned as owner of a residence and 11 morgen of land. It is also known that both sons of Cornelis settled in neighbouring Bleiswijk in the first half of the 16th century, where the family name Dirkzwager originated. This Cornelis of course has more descendants than are described here on this page but belonging to the patrician branch are only the descendants and direct ancestors of Maarten Dirkzwager (1767-1847).

In Bleiswijk, the first five generations of descendants of Cornelis were engaged in the peat trade until Pieter Arienszoon Dirkzwager († 1750) as a trader in salt and soap heralded the rise of the Dirkzwagers as traders and merchants.

His great-grandson Maarten Dirkzwager (1767-1847) is the common ancestor to whom the Dirkzwager coat of arms - the herring buss - applies and is the progenitor of the patrician family. This Maarten has three sons, including Gijsbert (1796-1873) and Cornelis (1809-1863). Gijsbert stays in Maassluis and Cornelis settles in Schiedam and forms the beginning of the Schiedam branch there.

Gijsbert has four sons of whom only Maarten (1825-1895) stays in Maassluis and forms the Maassluis branch. Nicolaas (1823-1887) settles in Moordrecht and forms the Moordrecht branch, Abraham (1830-1895) settles in Oud-Beijerland and forms the Oud-Beijerland branch and Jacob (1832-1915) settles in Rozenburg and forms the Rozenburg branch (†).

The Dirkzwager family has been included in genealogical reference work Nederland's Patriciaat in editions 29, 64 and 87, in 1943, 1978/1979 and 2006 respectively.
