= Janskerk, Haarlem =

Former church in the Dutch city of Haarlem

Coordinates: 52°22′59.54″N 4°38′16.55″E

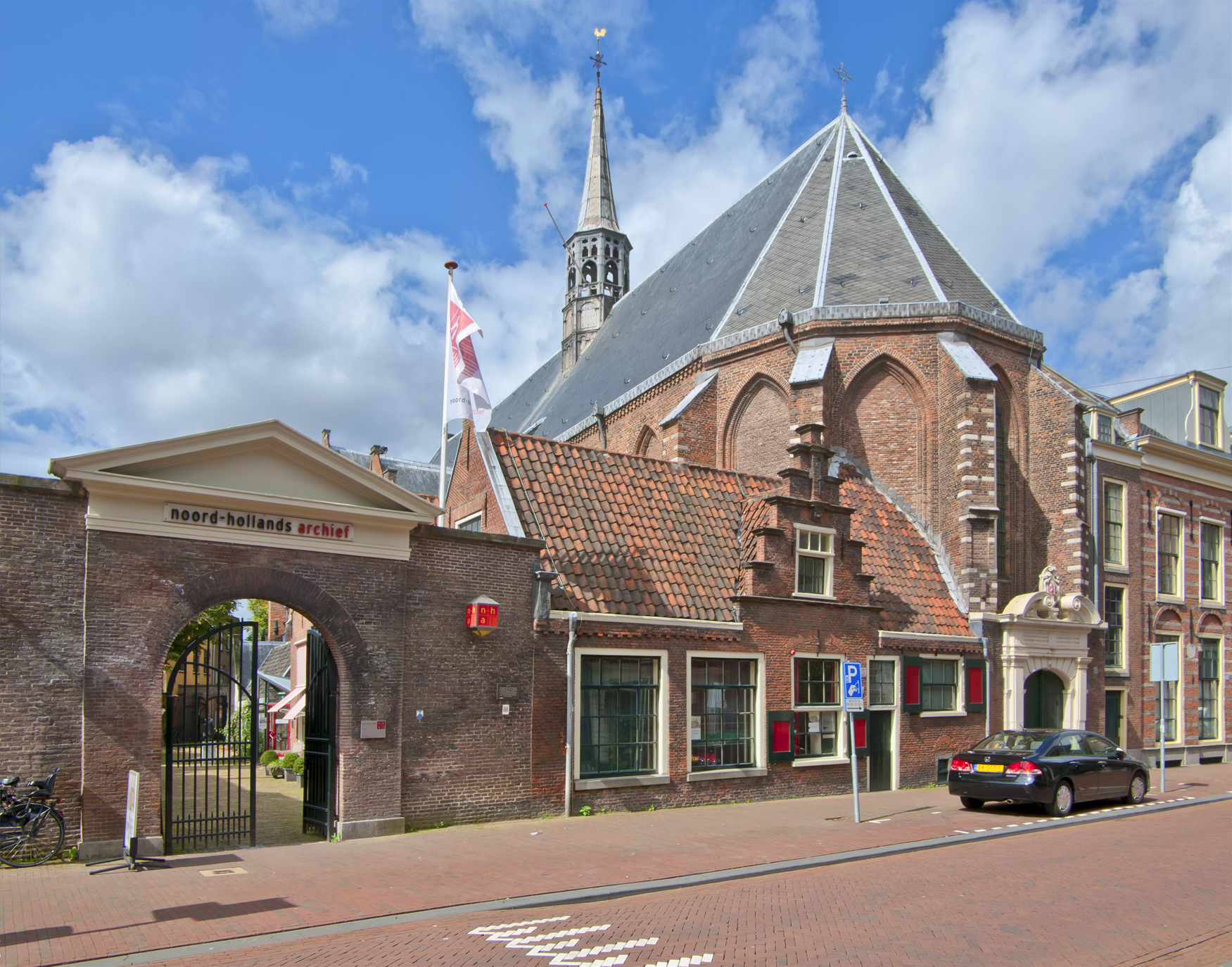
The Janskerk in Haarlem on the Jansstraat.

The Janskerk or St. John's Church is a former church in the Dutch city of Haarlem. Today it houses the North Holland Archives (Noord-Hollands archief).

== History ==
Gerard van Tetrode donated land in 1310 in the centre of Haarlem to build St. John's monastery. Later the St. Barbara gasthuis was founded in 1435 by the Hugo van Assendelft, priest of the St. John's monastery, on the south side of this area. The monastery's church and the old Gasthuis doorway are the only parts of the large complex that still exist today. It was a commandry of the Knights of Saint John and is the oldest church in Haarlem after the St. Bavochurch. The order of St. John was disbanded after the Protestant Reformation and the church reverted to the state in 1625. The Haarlem council sold most of the monastery's land, and much of the art during the following years, which added considerably to the wealth of the city.

In 1936 it became the location of the Haarlem Archives, and it is now the location for the North Holland Archives.

Though many objects from the church were removed from the city by the Order of St. John before the iconoclasm, many have also survived and are in the collection of the Frans Hals Museum or the Museum Catharijneconvent in Utrecht (which contains the former collection of the Haarlem Bishop museum).

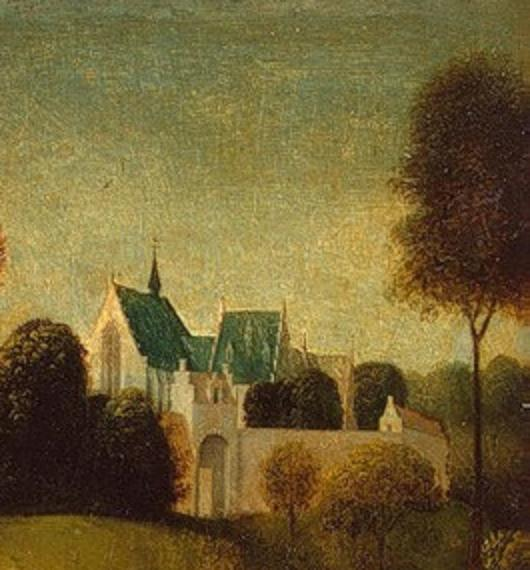
The Janskerk from the southwest in a painting by Geertgen tot Sint Jans.

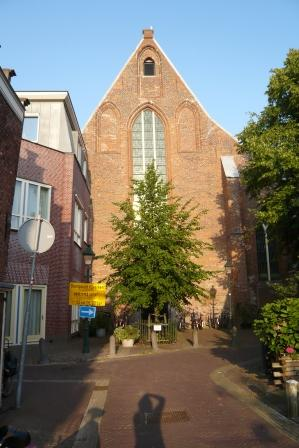
The Janskerk from the west (Pieterstraat).

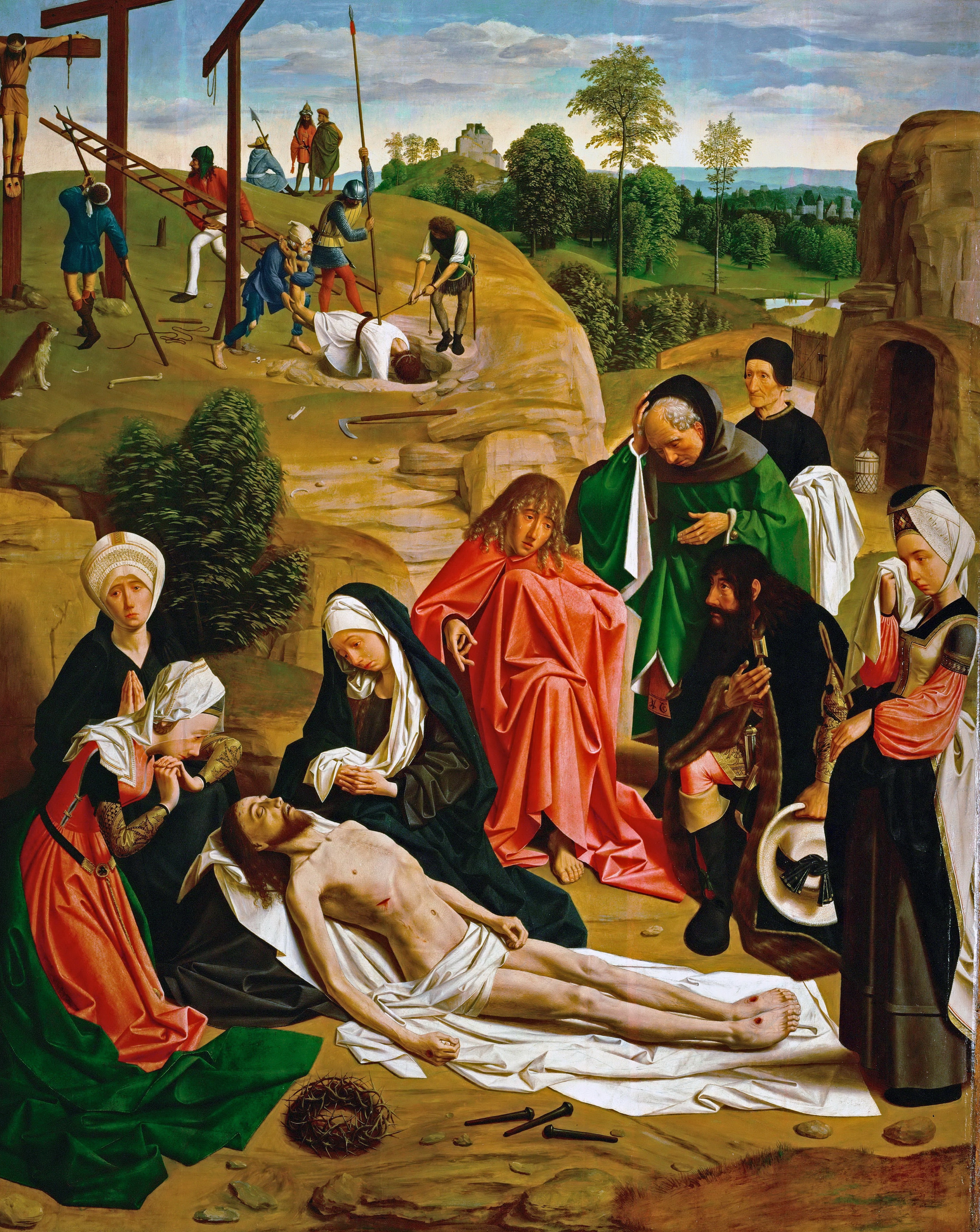
Geertgen tot Sint Jans painted The Lamentation of Christ for the altarpiece of the house of the Knights of Saint John in Haarlem.

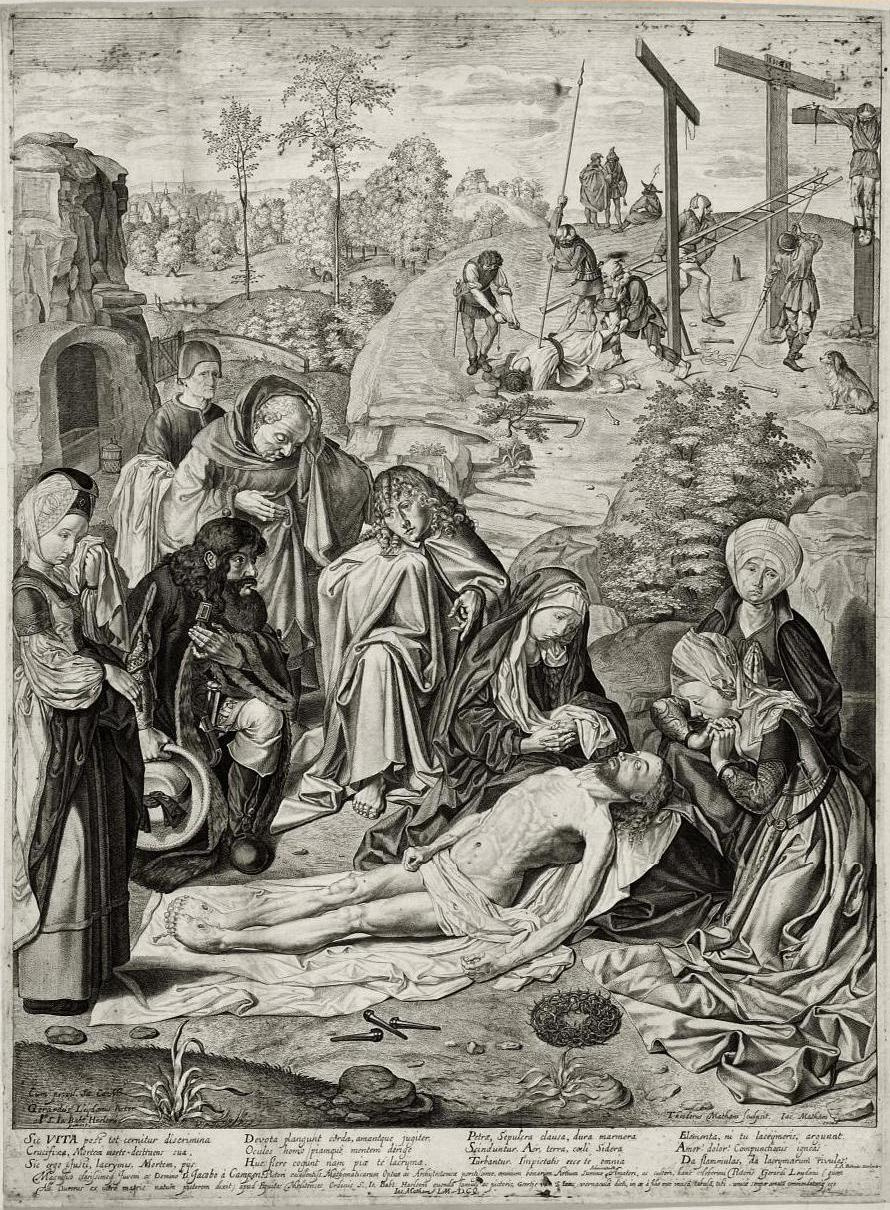
Mirror image engraving in 1620 by Jacob Matham, includes poem and latin quote of Dürer.

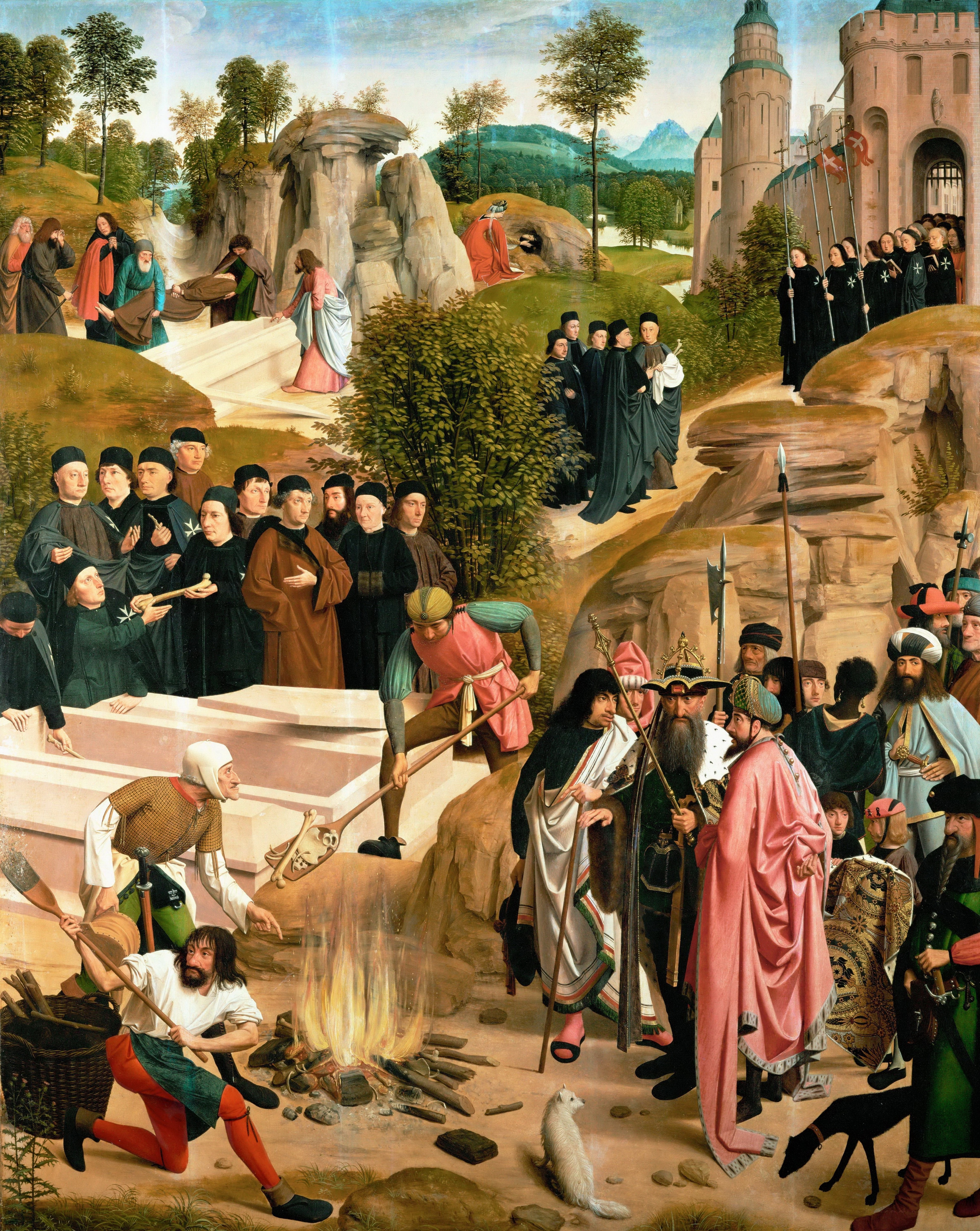
Other side of this altarpiece showing the burning of the bones of St. John. Probably contains a group portrait of the Haarlem members of the order of St. John, with the Commandeur or Precepteur holding the finger of St. John.

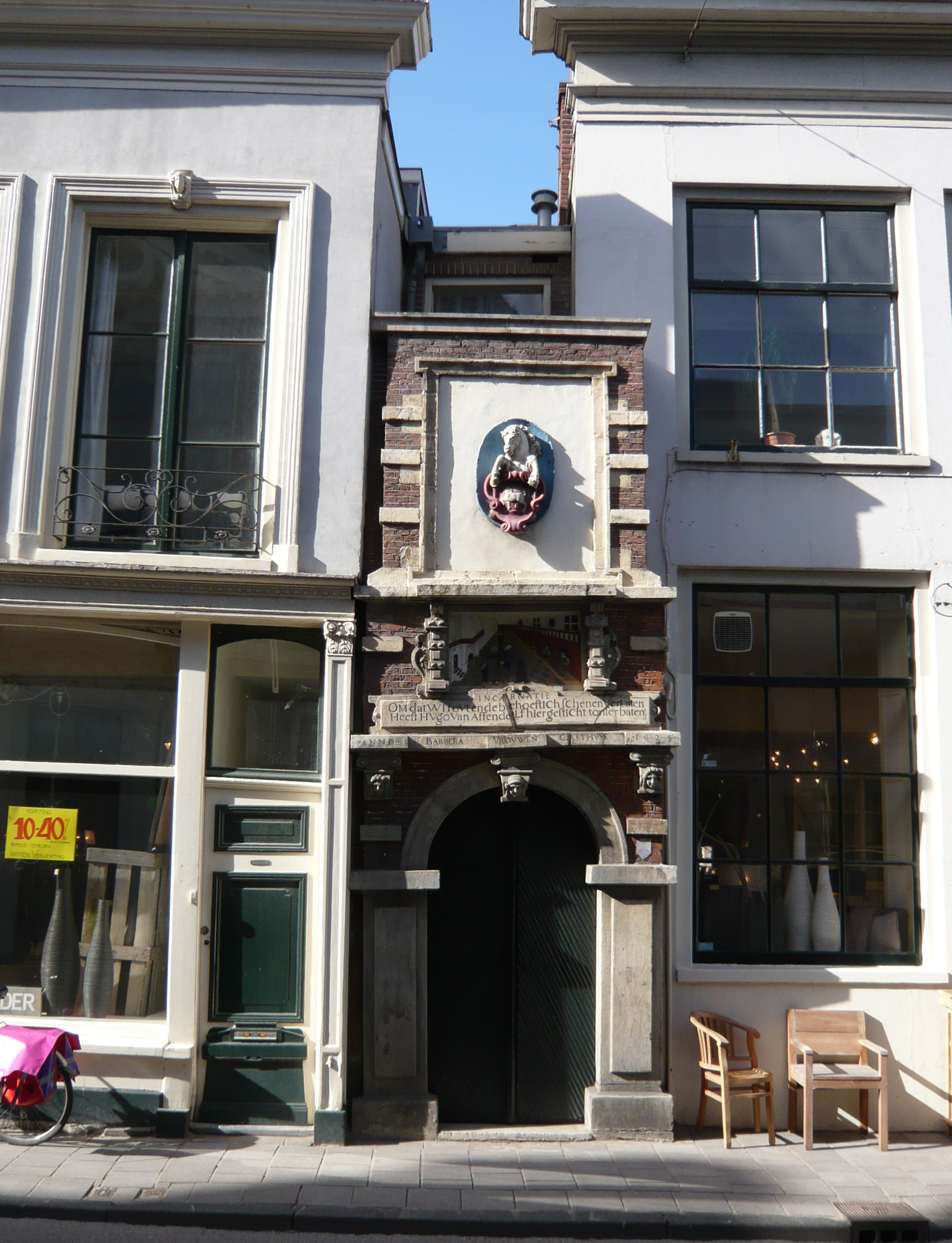
Doorway of St. Barbara gasthuis on the Janstraat.
