= Heldring (family) =

- family
- Country: Netherlands; Germany
- Founded: 17th century

Heldring is the name of a patrician family in the Netherlands.

== History ==
The family history begins with Hans Hendrik Heldring, born around 1649, a German army captain. who came to the Netherlands in 1672 and died in 1710 in Elburg. His descendants became important bankers, philanthropists and reverends.

The family history was published in the Nederland's Patriciaat series.

== Notable members ==
- Jérôme Louis Heldring
- Ottho Gerhard Heldring

== Literature ==
- Nederland's Patriciaat 49 (1963), p. 181-196.
- Inventory of the family archive
