= Kolff =

Dutch patrician family

- family
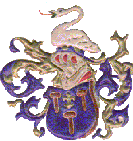
- Country: Netherlands
- Founded: 14th century
- Founder: Henric Colve

Kolff (also: Van Santen Kolff, Kolff van Oosterwijk and Van Breda Kolff) is the name of a Dutch patrician family originating from the provinces of Holland and Gelderland in the Netherlands.

== History ==
First known Kolffs are Wouter, Aernt Woutersz., Wouter Aerntsz., and Wouter Woutersz. Colff. They lived in 15th century Gorinchem where they owned property. Of them Wouter Aerntsz. and Wouter Woutersz. Colff also exploited a tavern. In this tavern, at least from around 1500, the game named Kolf was played. The Kolff family most likely derived their family name from the game of kolf. The present Kolffs descend from the grandson of the innkeeper, Wouter Woutersz. Kolff, 'burger' (citizenship) of the city of Nijmegen in the 16th century. The next generations gradually moved westwards from Nijmegen along the great rivers of the Netherlands towards Middelharnis, Maassluis, and other places. They established themselves in the 19th and 20th centuries mainly at Rotterdam and The Hague, but also in the Dutch East Indies. Another important branch settled in the Betuwe.

In the 20th century many Kolffs moved away from Netherlands' territory and independent Indonesia. Most of the current 411 members (2015) of the Kolff family live in the Netherlands, while about one third live in other countries, most of them in Argentina, the United States of America and New Zealand. The genealogy of the Kolff family is included in the Nederland's Patriciaat from its earliest issues and can be seen up to date at the website of the Kolff Family Association. The family archives are kept at the Rotterdam City Archives.

== Coat of arms ==
Kolff en Van Santen Kolff: the earliest known family member to use the coat of arms was Rev. Wolter Kolff (generation IX), according to the arms of alliance between his wife Petronella van Duyren and himself, dated 1671 (in the family archives). Within the shield without colours he used the three hammers (kolven, colven, or Kolffen), bats down, outer two inclining inwards, the middle one inclining to the right. As tarpaulin he used the swan. The coats of arms of Van Breda Kolff and Kolff van Oosterwijk are not shown here.

== Notable members ==
(order following the family genealogy branch)

- Dirk Hendrik Kolff (1761–1835), lieutenant-commander at sea (Vlieter Incident)
  - Dirk Hendrik Kolff (1800–1843), lieutenant at sea of the Koninklijke Marine
    - Louis Charles Kolff (1867–1922), mayor of Wieringen and member of the States-Provincial of North Holland
      - Louis Charles Kolff (1893–1970), mayor of Wieringen and res. 1st lieutenant of the artillery
- Henriëtte Jeannette Christine Kolff (1835–1927), founder, together with her brother Gualtherus (see below), of the Vereniging Kolffs Blindenfonds (Kolff Foundation for the Blind) and the Stichting Blindenhulp (Foundation to Assist the Blind)
- Gualtherus Johannes Kolff (1846–1918), founder and first director of Nederlandse Blindenbibliotheek
- Marius Kolff (1848–1931), mayor of Deil
  - Gualtherus Kolff (1879–1959), judge and member of the Senate
  - Willem Marinus Kolff (1882–1944), mayor of Deil
- Jacob (Jacques) van Santen Kolff (1848–1896), literary writer, music and art critic, drawing artist, and inventor of the name Hague School
- Jan Gualtherus van Breda Kolff (1894–1974), banker, youngest debutant (up to date 2015) in the Netherlands national football team
  - Willem Hendrik "Butch" van Breda Kolff (1922–2007), basketball coach Princeton University
    - Jan Michael van Breda Kolff (1951), college basketball head coach
- Cornelis Kolff (1897–1968), director of Tollens paint factories
- Benjamin Kolff (1902–1982), mayor of Vlissingen
- Willem Johan Kolff (1911–2009), was a pioneer of hemodialysis as well as in the field of artificial organs; was active in resistance
- Wouter Kolff (1976), mayor of Dordrecht
- Johannes Marius Kolff (1883-1958), lieutenant-colonel, colonel tit., consul of Liberia at Rotterdam, member municipal council of Wassenaar, initiator of construction of so-called Kolff-casemates at Kesteren and surroundings, Betuwestelling (Betuwe fortifications)
- Gualtherus Johannes Cornelis Kolff (1826–1881), founder of G. Kolff & Co., publishers at Batavia, in the Dutch East Indies, (Bataviaasch Nieuwsblad newspaper) with book shops all over the territory. Some years after Indonesia became independent, the company moved to the Netherlands, and is based mostly in Amsterdam and Leeuwarden
