= Ankersmit =

- family
- Country: Netherlands
- Founded: 17th century
- Founder: Rutger Ankersmit

Ankersmit (also: Kok Ankersmit) is the name of a Dutch patrician family from Wilp.

== History ==
The oldest known ancestor of the family is one Rutger Ankersmit who lived in Wilp in the 17th century. His great-grandson Hendrik Jan Ankersmit (1775-1850) moved to Deventer. His descendants became successful in the metal manufacture and textile industry. The name literally means "anchor smith."

== Notable members ==
- Frank Ankersmit, philosopher.
- Thomas Ankersmit, musician.

== Literature ==
- Nederland's Patriciaat 79 (1995), p. 1-64.
