= De Reiger =

de Reiger and variant forms Reiger, Reigers, and De Reijger is a Dutch surname. Notable people with the surname include:

- Kerreen Reiger (born 1946), Australian academic, sociologist and author
- Margie Reiger, silent movie actress
- Mason Reiger (born 2002), American football player

Reiger or de Rieger is also a placename:

- De Reiger, a windmill and smock mill in Nijetrijne, Friesland, Netherlands
- Reiger Park, a township in Gauteng, South Africa

== See also ==
- De Dans van de Reiger, a 1966 Dutch film
- Heron (De Reiger means 'the heron' in Dutch)
