= Van der Goes =

Van der Goes or van der Goes is a surname of Flemish-Dutch origin. Notable people with this name include:

- Adriaen van der Goes (c.1505–1560), Dutch Grand pensionary
- Aert van der Goes (1475–1545), Dutch Grand Pensionary
- Freddie van der Goes (1908–1976), South African freestyle swimmer
- Hugo van der Goes (c. 1430/1440 – 1482), Flemish painter
- Marinus Robyn van der Goes (1599/1606 – 1639), Flemish engraver
- Philips van der Goes (1651–1707), Dutch naval officer
- Wouter van der Goes (born 1973), Dutch radio DJ
