= Rost van Tonningen =

- family
- Country: Netherlands
- Founded: 18th century
- Founder: Jacob Rost

Rost van Tonningen is the name of a Dutch patrician family.

== History ==
The founder of the family is notary Jacob Rost van Tonningen (1753–1826), who was born as the illegitimate son of the jeweler's daughter Maria Barbara van Tonningen (1717–1791) and the manservant Jacob Rost.

== Family ==
- Nicolaas Albertus (Nico) Rost van Tonningen (Ambarawa, September 8, 1889 – Zeist, January 15, 1979 ) was a Dutch vice admiral and chief master of ceremonies.
- Nicolaas Albertus Rost van Tonningen (20 August 1933 - 2 November 2022) Banker and finance consultant.
- Nicholas Albertus Rost van Tonningen (16 March 1964)
- Nicolaas Albertus Rost van Tonningen (25 November 1994)
- Marinus Bernardus Rost van Tonningen (1852–1927), was a major general in the Dutch Army and the Royal Dutch East Indies Army. He is known for having commanded the Dutch intervention in Bali (1906) and the Dutch intervention in Bali (1908).[1][2]
- Meinoud Rost van Tonningen (1894–1945), Dutch politician and Nazi collaborator
- Florentine Rost van Tonningen (1914–2007), Dutch national socialist and extreme-right activist, wife of Meinoud
- Floris Rost van Tonningen (born 1977), co-founder of the Dutch social networking site Hyves, grandson of Meinoud and Florentine.
