= Tetrode (family) =

Tetrode coat of arms

The municipal coat of arms of Bloemendaal is based on the Tetrode family's coat of arms

Tetrode, also given as van Tetrode and spelled variously as Tetterode, Tetteroo, Tettero, Thetrode and Tetroe, was a Dutch medieval noble family which later became a prominent patrician family in Holland. The most famous member of this family was the 16th-Century sculptor Willem Danielsz van Tetrode, who hailed from Delft. The coat of arms of the Tetrode family, showing three leaves of the yellow water-lily, is now used as the municipal coat of arms of Bloemendaal (which includes Overveen, formerly the estate of Tetterode).

The family name refers to the medieval clearing of forest in the area of dunes directly west of Haarlem, in what is now Overveen, to make the land suitable for cultivation. Rode means "clearing of land" while Tet may have been the first name of the original owner of the land. The eldest known member of the family is Gerard van Tetrode, who in 1310 donated land in the centre of Haarlem to build St. John's monastery; the monastery's church still exists today as the Janskerk (St. John's Church). The family had a fiefdom called Tetterode in what is now Overveen, west of Haarlem. There they built a fortified house or castle called Saxenburg. The house was sketched by Rembrandt in 1651. Salomon van Ruysdael painted Haarlem from the dunes of Tetterode in the early 17th Century. The place name Tetterode disappears from maps around 1648.

The Tetrodes were particularly prominent in Leiden, where members of this rich and influential family of brewers served as burgomasters and aldermen, sheriffs, militia officers and church officials. Aernt van Tetrode (circa 1430-1471), sheriff and responsible for poor relief (Heilige Geestmeester) in Wassenaar, is considered the founder of the South Holland branch of the family. His son Willem van Tetrode was a rich brewer who built a hofje for the elderly in Leiden, the Sint Stevenshofje (also called Convent van Tetterode). This 15th-Century hofje still exists today.

Elisabeth van Tetrode was the grandmother of the Leiden-born painter Rembrandt (1606-1669). However, she was actually not a member of the Tetrode family but assumed the noble name because she had a cousin who had married into the Tetrode family.

== Sources ==
- The history of the family Tetrode, Tetterode, Tettero and the place Tetrode
- Homepage Tetterode, Tettero en Van Tetterode
