= Bijleveld (Westfalen) =

Dutch patrician family

- family
- Country: Netherlands

Bijleveld (also: van Eijk Bijleveld and van Eyk Bijleveld) is a Dutch patrician family.

== History ==
The family came originally from Westphalia. They came later to the Netherlands into the cities The Hague, Wassenaar, Amsterdam and Leiden. This family Bijleveld should not be confused with the other patrician Bijleveld family from Rhoon.

== Coat of arms ==
The coat of arms of the families Bijleveld, van Eijk Bijleveld and van Eyk Bijleveld is two pieces. The upper part has three blue six-pointed stars in gold. The lower part is colored green. The crest is a blue star between a blue spread. The tarpaulins are blue, conducted of gold.
