= Van Eeghen (family) =

Dutch patrician family

- family
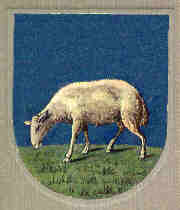
- Country: Netherlands
- Founded: 17th century

Van Eeghen is the name of a Dutch patrician family from Kortemark in Belgium.

In the 17th century moved from Flanders to Middelburg and Haarlem. Later some members founded a successful trading company in Amsterdam.

From 1795 until 1818, the family owned Kasteel Beek en Hoff.

== Notable members ==
- Isabella Henriette van Eeghen (1913–1996), Dutch historian
- Esmée van Eeghen (1918–1944), Dutch resistance fighter in World War II
- Hester van Eeghen (1958–2021), Dutch designer
- Mark van Eeghen (born 1952), American football player

== Bibliography ==
- Nederland's Patriciaat, 2e jaargang (1911).
- Nederland's Patriciaat, 10e jaargang.(1919).
- Nederland's Patriciaat, 45e jaargang.(1959).
