= Nederland's Patriciaat =

Genealogical record of Dutch patrician families

Nederland's Patriciaat, informally known as the Blue Book (Dutch: Het Blauwe Boekje), is a book series published annually since 1910, containing the genealogies of important Dutch patrician non-noble families. It is published by the Centraal Bureau voor Genealogie (CBG) in The Hague. The Publication Commission of the CBG determines which families are included. The publication was modelled after the Genealogisches Handbuch bürgerlicher Familien (from German: Genealogical Handbook of Bourgeois Families).

To be eligible for entry, families must have played an active and important role in Dutch society, fulfilling high positions in the government, in prestigious commissions and in other prominent public posts for over six generations or 150 years.

The longer a family has been listed in the Blue Book, the higher its esteem. The earliest entries are often families seen as co-equal to the high nobility (barons and counts), because they are the younger branches of the same family or have continuously married members of the Dutch nobility over a long period of time.

There are "regentenfamilies", whose forefathers were active in the administration of town councils, counties or the country itself during the Dutch Republic. Some of these families declined ennoblement because they did not keep a title in such high regard. At the end of the 19th century, they still proudly called themselves "patriciërs". Other families belong to the patriciate because they are held in the same regard and respect as the nobility but for certain reasons never were ennobled. Even within the same important families there can be branches with and without noble titles.

== See also ==
- List of Dutch patrician families
