= Frisian literature =

Frisian literature is works written in the Frisian languages, including that of West Frisian spoken in the province of Friesland in the Netherlands, from which most texts were produced or have survived. The first texts written in Frisian emerge around the 13th century.

== Medieval and early modern periods ==
Texts written in Frisian first appear in manuscripts from the late medieval period. Records of these, however, are fairly scarce and would generally not constitute literature, even if they did show some poetic merit. In 1498, Dutch became the official language in Friesland for all purposes of writing but Frisian would survive as a spoken language among the common people. Through the Renaissance, some authors would consciously attempt to preserve their language in short written works. Middle Frisian would generally be considered to begin around this time in the mid-16th century. The greatest impact came from the seventeenth-century schoolteacher from Bolsward, Gysbert Japiks, whose poetry attempted to prove Frisian's worth as a written language and brought about a revival amongst other Frisian authors in appreciating their native language, an appreciation that had slowed by the eighteenth century, the end of the Middle Frisian period.

== Modern period ==
=== Friesland ===
Modern West Frisian, beginning around 1800 with the Romantic movement, went through a rebirth. Many authors once again came to appreciate their language, and scholars studied West Frisian from an academic standpoint. Organizations were formed that drew supporters from upper and middle-class backgrounds. A further push of Dutch influence from the education system prompted the Brothers Halbertsma, Justus, Eeltsje, and Tsjalling Halbertsma, to create works in West Frisian, including De Alde Friezen, which became the national anthem of the Western Frisian people. Their works were collected and published as the famous Rimen en Teltsjes in 1871.

The Frisian language was firmly established as an academic study in the twentieth century (Rolf Bremmer is the current professor of Old Frisian at Leiden University), and the language is available for study in secondary education as well. After World War II, from around 1945 to 1963, Frisian literature experienced another period of growth with important authors and literary ambassadors like Anne Wadman, Fedde Schurer, Fokke Sierksma, and Lolle Nauta, though Wadman went to his grave disappointed that he had not succeeded in creating a rapprochement between Dutch and Frisian literatures. Still, Frisian literature continues to flourish at least within Friesland: Frisian authors were being promoted to the Dutch readership, and there are dozens of Frisian-language authors and literary magazines. At the same time, declining sales of literature in the Netherlands have affected Frisian literature as well, with estimates of the decline in sales of Frisian literature estimated at 30 to 40% since 2000, and library loans of Frisian books in one area declining from 152,000 in 2005 to 135,000 in 2007.

=== North Frisia ===
Literature in the various dialects of the North Frisian language developed only in the age of Romanticism. Earlier texts are extremely rare and the oldest sample of a North Frisian writing dates to ca. 1600, a translation of Martin Luther's Kleiner Katechismus (German: Little Catechism) into two North Frisian dialects. Early 19th century literature includes a comedy in Söl'ring, the dialect of Sylt island, and a novel by the same author Jap Peter Hansen, Di lekkelk Stjüürman [The lucky helmsman]. An approach to introduce a North Frisian magazine and a dictionary in the 1840s failed because of the upcoming national rivalries between either Danish or German oriented parts of the population. Other 19th century authors include Christian Peter Hansen, son of Jap Peter Hansen of Sylt, Christian Johansen of Amrum or Simon Reinhard Bohn, and Stine Andresen from Föhr. Also the North Frisian mainland produced authors in North Frisian language such as Johannes Hansen from the Bredstedt area or Moritz Momme Nissen from Enge. Nissen is known to have created the most comprehensive North Frisian dictionary which however remained unpublished. The 20th century brought a new development in North Frisian literature which started again on Sylt and spread across the islands to the mainland. Lorenz Conrad Peters, Jens Mungard, Albrecht Johannsen and James Krüss are notable authors of the early and middle 20th century. The first ever held North Frisian literature competition was won in 1991 by Ellin Nickelsen with a novelette in Fering.

The problems of North Frisian literature include the limited number of speakers, the dialectal divisions which are mostly mutually unintelligible, a lack of writing tradition and a rural background without urban cultural centres and a late standardisation of orthography for the main dialects.

== See also ==
- Frisian languages
  - Old Frisian
  - North Frisian
  - East Frisian: Saterland Frisian, Wangerooge Frisian, Wursten Frisian
  - West Frisian
- Dutch literature
