= Rimen en Teltsjes =

- Author: Brothers Halbertsma
- Genre: poetry and short story collection
- Publisher: fa. J. de Lange (1st edition); A. J. Osinga Uitgeverij (10th edition, 1993)
- Publication date: 1871
- Pages: 621 (1993 edition)
- ISBN: 9 06 06 64 892
- ISBN above is of the 1993 edition

Rimen en Teltsjes ('Rhymes and Tales', pronounced [ˈrimən ɛn ˈtɛltsjəs]) is the national book of Western Frisian literature, written by the three Brothers Halbertsma. It is an extensive collection of short stories and poems, the first of which was published in 1822 under the title of De Lapekoer fan Gabe Skroar. Rimen en Teltsjes developed its present-day form in the course of the 19th century, when the Halbertsma's continuously added new work to their previous publications. Eventually their works were gathered together, and the first edition of the actual Rimen en Teltsjes was published posthumously in 1871. Although the literary value of this collection was later disputed by some critics, Rimen en Teltsjes and its predecessor De Lapekoer fan Gabe Skroar played a role of crucial importance in the development of a new literary tradition after Western Frisian had been used almost exclusively as a spoken language for three centuries.

== The authors ==
The three Brothers Halbertsma, the authors of Rimen en Teltsjes, were born in the village of Grou, in the central part of the Dutch province of Friesland in the late 18th century. The two most important of the brothers were Justus Hiddes Halbertsma (1789–1869), a Mennonite minister in Bolsward en from 1822 onwards in Deventer, and Eeltsje Hiddes Halbertsma (1797–1858), who was a physician in Grou. Justus was a man of science, a prominent linguist, who was acquainted with German literary figures such as the Brothers Grimm. He strongly sensed what the public needed, but at the same time he was a somewhat distant and cerebral author, which tended to have an averse effect on his poetry. His brother Eeltsje, whose prose and poetry were of equal quality, was probably the most talented of the brothers. He was also a much more emotional person, who was sometimes overcome by periods of melancholy, which found an outlet in his writings. The third brother, Tsjalling Hiddes Halbertsma (1792–1852), who was a butter and cheese merchant in Grou, was greatly overshadowed by his brothers as a literary writer. His oeuvre mainly consisted of folk literature, which, however, became quite popular with the common man.

== Origins ==
As Justus Hiddes Halbertsma would tell it later, the first step towards the writing of Rimen en Teltsjes was taken when his brother Eeltsje returned from his study in Heidelberg, in Germany, in 1818, and noticed that the street songs in the Netherlands were of a very low quality compared to those in Germany. According to Justus, Eeltsje then set out to write poetry with the intent of replacing the existing songs with better ones of his own making. The linguist Philippus H. Breuker, who added an extensive and penetrating afterword to the reprint of Rimen en Teltsje of 1993, observed, however, that this assertion could "never be more than half the truth," as Eeltsje's early poetry was not of a high literary standard; quite the opposite, in fact. According to Breuker, it seems more likely that Eeltsje wanted to emulate these Dutch street songs.

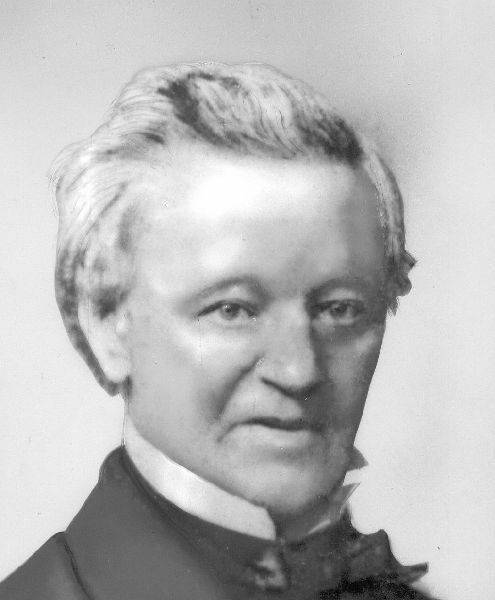
Justus Hiddes Halbertsma

In any case, Justus as well as Eeltsje started writing poetry and short fiction, and as Justus remained the editor of Eeltsje's works for his entire life, their oeuvres were strongly connected and published together from the very beginning. In 1822, the best of their early works were collected under the title of De Lapekoer fan Gabe Skroar ("Gabe Tailor's Rag Basket"; original, archaic spelling: De Lape Koer fen Gabe Skroor), a booklet consisting of 36 pages, and including six poems and one short story. This publication was attributed to the fictional 'Gabe Skroar', a lame farmer's son who became a tailor and a writer, but died young. This character was in all probability a creation of Eeltsje's. Hiding behind such a fictional author was fairly normal at that time, but Breuker suggests that an extra reason may have been that the Halbertsmas felt it was a little silly to put two names on such a limited collection.

The character of Gabe Skroar (or 'Gabe Tailor') was somewhat ambiguous from the very beginning, which was caused by the difference in the styles of writing used by Justus and Eeltsje. Where Eeltsje's Gabe remained a simple farmer's son who liked to potter about with his writings in the wasted hours, Justus' Gabe was implicitly a more lettered man, who clearly had literary ambitions. Furthermore, Gabe Skroar's role changed in the course of time: in 1822, he was presented only as the writer of the collection, but in the publications of 1829 and 1834, he developed into the main character of the stories. In the long run, the character of Gabe became unusable, which was mostly due to Justus' constant little adjustments, and in 1839 even Eeltsje had to admit that there was no point anymore to publishing their works under Gabe Skroar's name.

== Development ==
The first edition of De Lapekoer fan Gabe Skroar, published in 1822, consisted of 200 copies only. Those were not sold, however, but at the expense of Justus Halbertsma presented to acquaintances of his all over Friesland. In this way he awoke among his public a desire for more reading-matter of this nature. Later he would write about this: "That first blow was half the battle. The fans who did not receive a copy were squealing like bleeding pigs, and the way was cleared for all the stories and poems which followed." The contents of De Lapekoer were in fact something entirely different from what readers were used to, not only as to what language they were written in, but also and especially concerning their informal style. Copies of the booklet were often shared around through entire networks of family and friends, and frequently its stories and poems were transcribed by hand before the booklet was given back or passed on. A second, expanded edition of De Lapekoer fan Gabe Skroar, consisting of 237 pages, was published in 1829, followed by a third, further expanded edition in 1834, running to almost 500 pages in a larger size. After that, additions were published separately in 1836 (De Noarger Rún oan Gabe Skroar), 1840 (Twigen út in Alde Stamme), 1854 (Leed en Wille en de Flotgerzen), and 1858 (De Jonkerboer and Teltsjes fan de Wize Mannen fan Esonstêd).

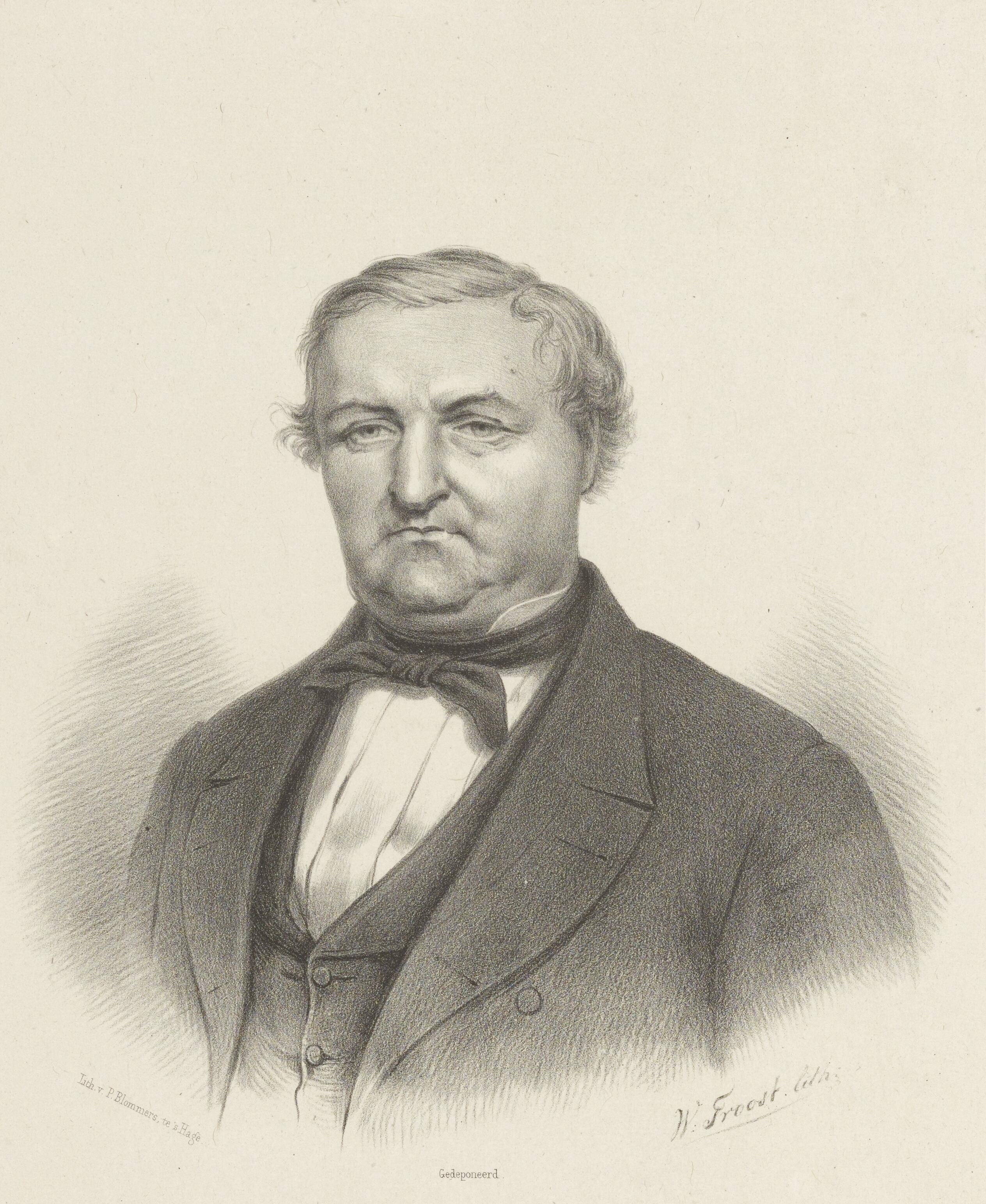
Eeltsje Hiddes Halbertsma

After the death of all three brothers, their short fiction and poetry was collected and published in 1871 by the publishing house of J. de Lange in Deventer (where Justus Halbertsma had lived) under the title of Rimen en Teltsjes ('Rhymes and Tales'). This was done in thirteen installments (the first of which was published in October 1868), which meant it took more than two years before the buyers, who had to subscribe to the entire series of installments, possessed the book in its complete form. The decision to publish Rimen en Teltsjes was made in 1863, and the first two installments were edited by Justus Hiddes Halbertsma himself. He even wrote some new pieces for the collection, such as the short story It Grouwe Pak ('The Thick Suit'). The rest of the installments were, however, composed under the supervision of librarian and archivist Gerben Colmjon and bookseller and historian Wopke Eekhoff, with Eekhoff giving permission to add the works by Eeltsje Halbertsma which had originally been published by him, not De Lange. Rimen en Teltsjes, in its complete form, was a thick book, with 586 closely printed pages, full to the brim with short stories and poems, including classics like De Boalserter Merke ('The Bolsward Fair'), Jonker Pyt en Sibbel ('Squire Pete and Sibylle'), Deagraverssankje ('Grave-digger's Song'), De Reis nei de Jichtmasters ('The Journey to the Gout Masters'), It Marke ('The Little Lake'), De Alde Friezen ('The Frisians of Old', which became the national anthem of the Western Frisian people in 1875), Sibbel fan De Ryp ('Sibylle from De Ryp'), Skipperssankje ('Skipper's Song'), De Likeblommen ('The Leek Flowers'), Op Anna's Dea ('On Anna's Death'), and De Jonkerboer ('The Gentleman Farmer').

The first reprint of Rimen en Teltsjes was published in 1881, again by the firm of J. de Lange. This time, the sole editor was Gerben Colmjon, who, in general, did not make many changes to the first edition, although he did introduce "a certain unity in the spelling of vowels and consonants." It is possible that in 1887 there was a reprint issued of the 1881 edition, although Breuker considers it likely that the scant sources for this were actually referring to a remnant of the 1881 printing. In any case, nothing was changed in the text of the book. In 1891 G. M. Merkelbach from Bolsward resolved to publish a new edition, but nothing came of it, and neither did the linguist Foeke Buitenrust Hettema succeed in publishing the new edition he contemplated in 1892. Hence it was not until 1895 before a new edition saw the light, published by the Deventer Boek- en Steendrukkerij (formerly the firm of J. de Lange). It was edited by W. P. de Vries, who changed the text to the so-called Selskipsstavering ('Society Spelling'), which had been introduced for the Western Frisian language in 1879. However, because he retained the layout from the 1881 edition, this caused a rather restless page image, as he kept exactly the same words on a given line, while the number of letters within the words was changed quite dramatically in some cases.

In 1904, publisher Rinse van der Velde from Leeuwarden bought the rights to Rimen en Teltsjes and the remnant of the 1895 printing from De Lange's heirs. After he had sold the last of the 1895 books in 1916, he began to prepare for a new edition, which would see the light in 1918. To that end he asked his friend, the artist Ids Wiersma, to make a series of illustrations, which afterwards developed into a permanent fixture of Rimen en Teltsjes, and have become almost as famous as the book itself. Wiersma, as a matter of fact, was paid for his drawings by the Halbertsma family, instead of by Van der Velde. The 1918 edition of Rimen en Teltsjes was printed on thin paper by Jacob Hepkema of Heerenveen. Minister Geart Aeilco Wumkes was asked to write an introduction, for which he could draw on the extensive correspondence between the Halbertsma Brothers which the family made available for his use. This meant that after 37 years the Dutch-language introduction Eekhoff had added to the 1881 edition was finally discarded. The composition of Rimen en Teltsjes itself was also changed, especially by adjusting the sequence in which the stories and poems were placed, and also by the addition of several of the Brothers Halbertsma's works which had remained outside of the collection up until then. The most important of these was De Wiersizzerij fan Maaike Jakkeles ('The Fortune-telling of Maaike Jakkeles'), with which the contribution of Tsjalling Hiddes Halbertsma finally took on a more visible form. This was primarily done on the insistence of Wumkes, who was an admirer of Tsjalling Halbertsma. The 1918 edition of Rimen en Teltsjes was again published in installments, which meant the book did not reach its complete form before October 1919.

In the Second World War the German authorities in the German-occupied Netherlands gave permission towards the end of 1943 for a fifth edition of Rimen en Teltsjes to be issued, which was yet again published in installments, by Van der Velde of Leeuwarden, between the summer of 1944 and September 1945. This edition was printed by Miedema & Co. in Leeuwarden, and had a large printing (for the standards of Western Frisian literature) of 2,500 copies, which was however outsubscribed three times and therefore sold out immediately. The editor this time was the author J. P. Wiersma, who added a new introduction of his own making, in which he offered a romanticised biography of the Brothers Halbertsma.

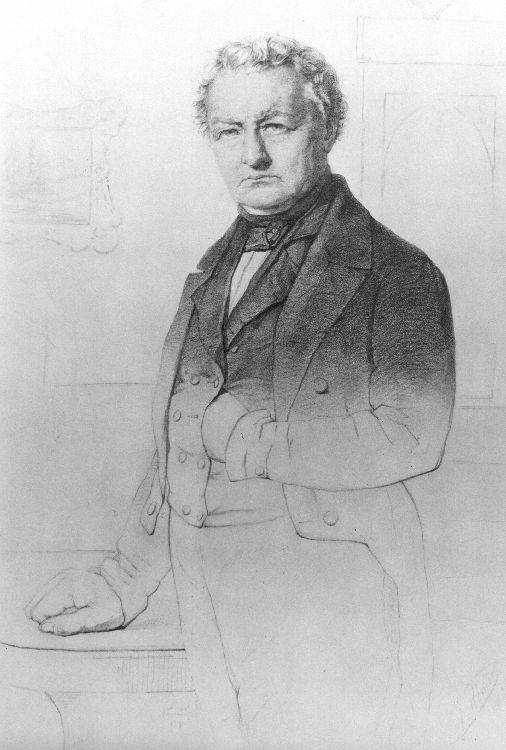
Tsjalling Hiddes Halbertsma

When in 1958 the sixth edition was published, Wiersma was again the editor. At that time, he replaced his earlier introduction with a new one, which was clearer and more matter-of-fact and to the point, but he also made further changes to the Halbertsma's text and choice of words, which he had smoothed and simplified somewhat already for the 1944 edition. This intervention (or interference) of Wiersma's led to a large amount of criticism, although there is a case to be made that these changes were actually beneficial to the uninitiated reader. The publishers of the 1958 edition were Van der Velde and A. J. Osinga Publishers of Bolsward. Afterwards two facsimile editions were published in 1969 and 1978, which were direct photocopies of the 1958 edition (in 1969), and the 1969 edition (in 1978) respectively. Especially Ids Wiersma's illustrations were not improved by making a copy of a copy.

In 1993 the 10th edition of Rimen en Teltsjes was published by A. J. Osinga Publishers of Drachten, in the framework of the series of Fryske Klassiken ('Frisian Classics'), consisting of the republishing of fourteen classics of Western Frisian literature. For the composition of this edition editor Philippus H. Breuker reached back to the original edition of 1871, while retaining later additions, like Ids Wiersma's illustrations and the stories and poems which had been absorbed into the collection in 1918. These were now appended to the rear of the original Rimen en Teltsjes under the title Neirisping ('After-harvest'), to which Breuker also added some earlier, lower-quality works by the three authors, which had never before been part of Rimen en Teltsjes. As for the spelling, Breuker remained as close as possible to the 1871 edition as long as that did not make the text entirely incomprehensible to modern readers. The 1993 edition had an ambitious printing (for Western Frisian literature) of 3,000 copies, but was sold out within two months.

== Reception ==
When the Brothers Halbertsma started on De Lapekoer fan Gabe Skroar, there was not much enthusiasm in Friesland for reading Western Frisian-language literature. The so-called Grutte Lapekoer ('Big Rag Basket'; that is to say, the 1834 edition) needed twenty years to sell out, to Justus Halbertsma's disappointment. In the letters he wrote later in life, Justus indicates, however, that he would do it all over again, as he and Eeltsje had set themselves the goal of making the Frisian people start to read in their own language again, and by 1850 they had succeeded handsomely. By that time they had won a large number of loyal fans, as they would be called today, consisting mostly of people of standing, such as ministers, physicians, public notaries, gentleman farmers, etc., and also of the peasantry. Furthermore, there must also have been interested persons from outside of Friesland, and from among the urban middle class, as Gerben Colmjon mentioned in 1881 that Rimen en Teltsjes was often read, by that time, by people who did not speak Frisian in daily life.

By the end of the 19th century, Rimen en Teltsjes was held in high regard in Western Frisian literary circles, being the book which had rescued the Western Frisian language from literary oblivion. In the oeuvre of poets like Obe Postma and Pieter Jelles Troelstra, who grew up in that period, Rimen en Teltsjes reverberates quite clearly. Even in 1918, Geart Aeilco Wumkes wrote, "this book remains a monument for a section of the life of a nation, which calls on the Frisian soul to love its own nature and being."

At the beginning of the 20th century, such admiration turned to aversion, a development coinciding largely with the formation of the Jongfryske Mienskip ('Community of Young Frisians') in 1915. This was inevitable, really, since Rimen en Teltsjes was the seminal book of the generation against which the Young Frisians were reacting. Douwe Kalma, the pre-eminent representative of the new order, maintained that "on the development of the Frisian spiritual life [this book] can not have other than an unsuitable and unfavourable influence." Kalma measured (in concurrence with the notions of his time) the literary value of a book by the degree of life tragedy which it included, and concluded that Rimen en Teltsjes were no more than "vulgar children's amusement" and a "cruel mockery" of said life tragedy. He even went so far as to say that the works of the Brothers Halbertsma had "spiritually murdered thousands of people." Another Young Frisian, Eeltsje Boates Folkertsma, missed in Rimen en Teltsjes not so much life tragedy as the mysticism which he felt was an indispensable element of true literature. In fact, for all intents and purposes Kalma's opinion and Folkertsma's were much the same when it came to Rimen en Teltsjes.

In the middle of the 20th century, when the Young Frisian fire had died down somewhat, the pendulum swung back in the other direction. At that time literary critics like Anne Wadman, Jelle Hindriks Brouwer and Ype Poortinga again found beauty in Rimen en Teltsjes, referring primarily to Eeltsje Halbertsma's poetry. Wadman wrote that the Halbertsmas gave "the Western Frisian people a literary monument, in which it saw its own life as a nation [...] reflected." As neither Willem Bilderdijk nor Isaäc da Costa were fit to hold a candle to Eeltsje Halbertsma (Wadman also wrote), one would look in vain for someone of the same stature in the Dutch literature of the same period. The linguist Philippus H. Breuker, writing in 1993, for the most part subscribed to the same view, and elucidated that it was the wistfulness for what was and the surprise for what is which makes Eeltsje Halbertsma's poetry in particular so special. Justus Halbertsma's works, on the other hand, are more abstract, revolve more around ideas and not so much around emotions, and therefore they have a more sharp-edged feel.

As of today the Brothers Halbertsma's Rimen en Teltsjes still occupies the first slot in the ranking of Western Frisian literary classics. It is commonly seen as "the classical work of Western Frisian literature. It is read by high and low, by learned and unlearned, maybe even still by Frisian and un-Frisian."

== Sources ==
- Breuker, Philippus H., Oer Skriuwers, Boek en Utjeften, in: Halbertsma, Brothers, Rimen en Teltsjes, Drachten (A.J. Osinga Uitgeverij), 1993, ISBN 9 06 06 64 892, pp. 587–613.
- Breuker, Philippus H., Rimen en Teltsjes; Halbertsma, Eeltsje; Halbertsma, Justus (Joost Hiddes); Halbertsma, Tsjalling Hiddes in: Schroor, Meindert, ed., Nieuwe Encyclopedie van Fryslân, Gorredijk/Leeuwarden (Utjouwerij Bornmeer/Tresoar), 2016, ISBN 978-9 05 61 53 755, pp. 1123–1124, 1126–1128, 2251.
- Dykstra, Klaes, and Bouke Oldenhof, Lyts Hânboek fan de Fryske Literatuer, Leeuwarden (Afûk), 1997, ISBN 9 07 00 10 526.
- ――, Fryslân Sjongt, Leeuwarden (Afûk), 2000, ISBN 9 06 27 33 611.
- Halbertsma, Brothers, Rimen en Teltsjes, Bolsward/Leeuwarden (A.J. Osinga Uitgeverij/R. van der Velde), 1958, no ISBN.
- Halbertsma, Brothers, Rimen en Teltsjes, Drachten (A.J. Osinga Uitgeverij), 1993, ISBN 9 06 06 64 892.
- Hemminga, Piet, Fryslân: Fêstens en Feroaring, in: Hiemstra, Sytze T., De Fryslannen, Leeuwarden (Frisian Council/Afûk), 2008, ISBN 978-9 06 27 37 734.
- Jensma, Goffe, Cultuur in Friesland en Friese Cultuur, 1795–1917, in: Frieswijk, Johan, et al., red., Geschiedenis van Friesland 1750–1995, Amsterdam/Leeuwarden (Uitgeverij Boom/Fryske Akademy), 1998, ISBN 9 05 35 23 685, pp. 172–212.
- Oppewal, Teake, and Pier Boorsma, Spiegel van de Friese Poëzie: Van de Zeventiende Eeuw tot Heden, Amsterdam (J.M. Meulenhoff B.V.), 1994, ISBN 9 02 90 47 569.
- Schroor, Meindert, ed., Nieuwe Encyclopedie van Fryslân, Gorredijk/Leeuwarden (Utjouwerij Bornmeer/Tresoar), 2016, ISBN 978-9 05 61 53 755.
- Terpstra, Pieter, Tweeduizend Jaar Geschiedenis van Friesland, Leeuwarden (Uitgeverij M.Th. van Seyen), no year, no ISBN, pp. 312–323.
- Twerda, Hendrik, Fan Fryslâns Forline, Bolsward (A.J. Osinga N.V.), 1968, no ISBN, pp. 296–299.
- Wadman, Anne, Frieslands Dichters, Leiden (L. Stafleu), 1949, no ISBN.
- Wiersma, J. P., Foarwurd and De Bruorren Halbertsma, in: Halbertsma, Brothers, Rimen en Teltsjes, Bolsward (A.J. Osinga N.V.), 1958, pp. 5–14.
- Wumkes, Geart Aeilco, Bodders yn de Fryske Striid, Bolsward (A.J. Osinga N.V.), 1926, no ISBN.
