= Justus Hiddes Halbertsma =

Frisian writer, minister and lexicographer

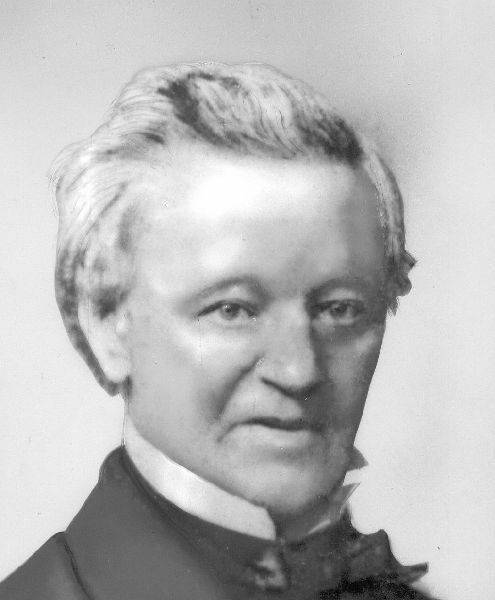
- Born: 23 October 1789; Grou, Netherlands
- Died: 27 February 1869 (aged 79); Deventer, Netherlands
- Citizenship: Dutch
- Occupations: Minister, linguist, poet, writer
- Spouse: Johanna Iskjen Hoekema (m. 1816; died 1847)
- Children: 5
- Writing career
- Language: West Frisian, Dutch
- Years active: 1822–1869
- Period: 19th century
- Genres: Poetry, short stories, non-fiction
- Notable works: Rimen en Teltsjes; Lexicon Frisicum
- Movement: Romanticism

Justus Hiddes Halbertsma (West Frisian: Joast Hiddes Halbertsma [joǝst ˈhɪdəs ˈhɔlbǝtsma]; Dutch: Joost Hiddes Halbertsma [joːst ˈɦɪdəs ˈɦɑlbǝrtsmaː]; 23 October 1789 – 27 February 1869) was a Frisian writer, poet, minister, lexicographer and linguist. Today, he is primarily known for the poetry and short story collection De Lapekoer fan Gabe Skroar, which he wrote with his brother Eeltsje, publishing the first edition in 1822. Afterwards, this work was continually expanded, and also came to include contributions by a third brother, Tsjalling, until all the Halbertsma Brothers' prose and poetry was posthumously collected in 1871 to become the famous work Rimen en Teltsjes. Although the literary value of this collection was later disputed by some critics, it is undeniable that Rimen en Teltsjes played a role of crucial importance in the development of a new literary tradition after Western Frisian had been used almost exclusively as a spoken language for three centuries.

== Life ==
=== Youth and background ===
Justus Hiddes Halbertsma was born on 23 October 1789 in the village of Grou, in the central part of the Dutch province of Friesland, in the house of his parents on Kowemerk ("Cow Market") street. He was the eldest son of the baker and small-time merchant Hidde Joasts Halbertsma (1756–1809) and his wife Ruerdtsje (or Riurtk) Tsjallings Binnerts (1767–1809). He had three younger brothers: Tsjalling (1792–1852), Binnert (1795–1847), and Eeltsje (1797–1858). Two children who were born later died in early childhood, the little boy in 1803, and the little girl in 1805. The four brothers were very close, possibly as a consequence of the fact that both their parents died at a relatively young age in 1809, when Justus was just twenty years of age and the others were even younger. Justus, Tsjalling and Eeltsje, who, as authors, became known as the Brothers Halbertsma later in life, were much like their father, while Binnert more resembled their mother.

Ruerdtsje Binnerts was a scion of a prominent family in Grou. Her people were Mennonites, and although her husband had been raised a Calvinist, he converted after marrying her. From Justus' letters Ruerdtsje emerges as a smart businesswoman, a loving mother, and a deeply religious person. About Hidde Halbertsma, the father, much less is known. It is thought that he might have been a mariner before his marriage. He is described as a gentle soul, who was, however, apt to take offence, and could be quite sharp-tongued in such cases. In 1784, he published a long Dutch-language poem under the title Schrikkelijke IJsgang en Overstroominge in Gelderland ("Terrible Ice-drift and Flooding in Gelderland"). From this intriguing work it is clear that his sons' literary talents were a family trait.

In 1858, Justus Halbertsma explained the difference between his parents' families when he wrote: "One cannot deny the Halbertsmas a greater skillfulness, speed of thought, a greater adroitness, quickness, and talent than the family of Ruerdtsje Tsjallings; but wat help was that to them against the poverty which overcame most of them, while Ruerdtsje Tsjallings' family for the most part maintain prosperity to this day as part of the dignified middle class?" Against the superior power of those who calmly and calculatedly grew rich, he wrote somewhere else, the Halbertsmas could only "avenge themselves through satire."

=== Education, clerical career, and family ===
Halbertsma's mother Ruerdtsje was the main force behind the thorough education her sons received. Justus she sent to the French school in the provincial capital of Leeuwarden for a year, and after that, she enrolled him in the Latin school in Leeuwarden from 1801 to 1806. At the advice of his mother and the Mennonite minister Jan Brouwer, from Leeuwarden, Justus Halbertsma chose a clerical career, for which he studied theology at the Mennonite Seminary in Amsterdam from 1807 to 1813. In that period he also immersed himself in the study of the North Germanic languages. In 1814, Halbertsma became minister in Bolsward, where he remained until 1821. Afterwards, he served the Mennonite congregation in the city of Deventer, in the province of Overijssel, from 1822 to his retirement in 1856.

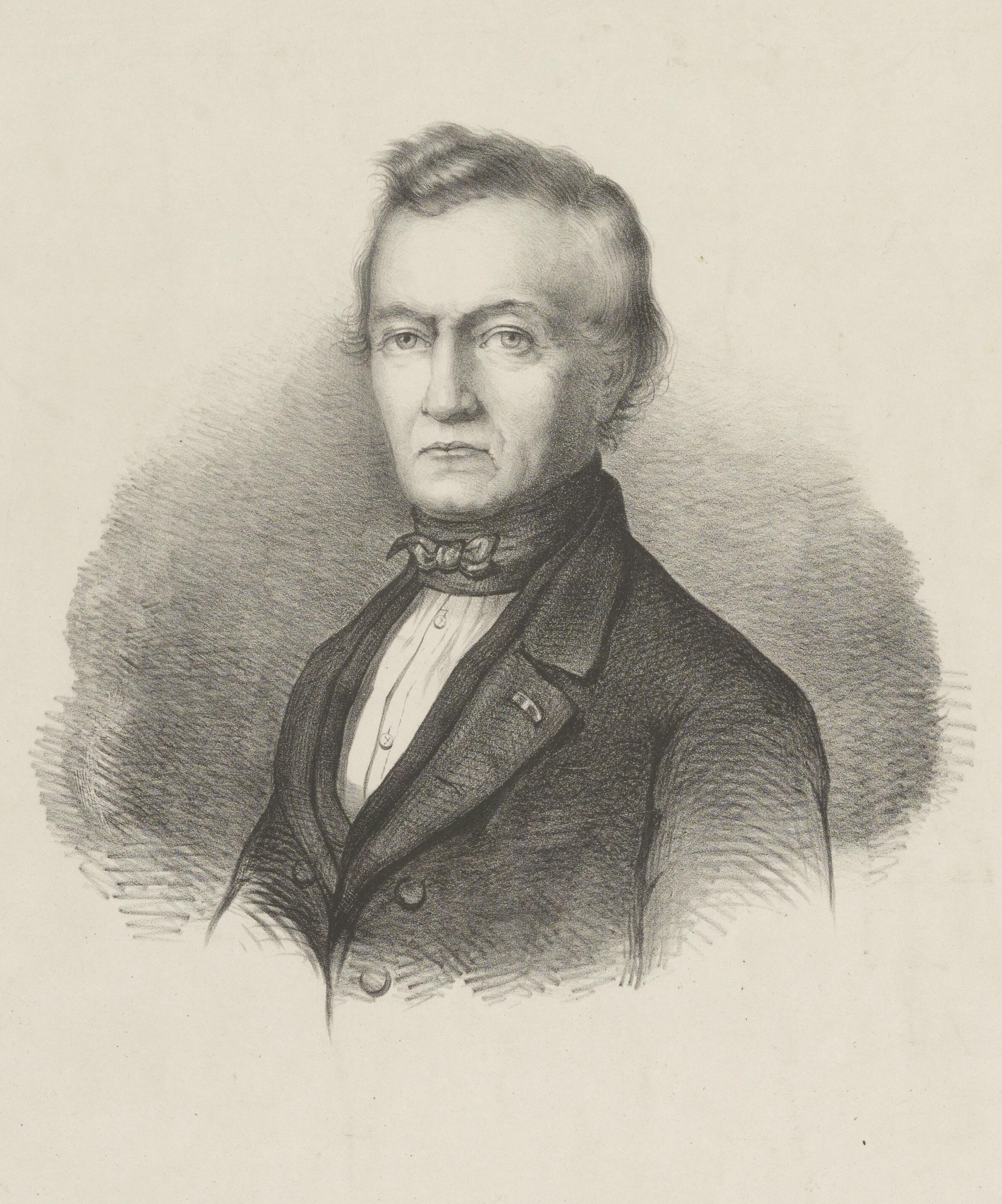
Justus Hiddes Halbertsma, drawn by an unknown artist, around 1835.

Halbertsma married Johanna Iskjen Hoekema (1794–1847), a Mennonite minister's daughter from Workum, who came from a well-to-do middle-class family, on 10 May 1816. Through his wife Halbertsma attained possession of the farmstead Westerein, near Workum, where he and his family often spent a couple of weeks in summer. Apart from those holidays, he lived out his entire life in Deventer. Halbertsma and his wife had five sons from a good marriage, which was however not without its share of problems. Of these sons Petrus, Hidde, and Tsjalling studied linguistics or medicine, while Watse en Binnert became mariners. As a father, Halbertsma experienced a large amount of grief, as his son Petrus died in 1851 in a psychiatric hospital, while Binnert died in 1861, and Hidde took his own life in 1865.

=== As a literary figure ===
Halbertsma had been greatly influenced in his student years by his acquaintance with the well-to-do and influential Amsterdam merchant Jeronimo de Vries, who championed a national art, inspired by the Dutch Golden Age. These ideas flew in the face of more modern notions advocated by writers such as Hiëronymus van Alphen and Johannes Klinker. For Halbertsma, who was first and foremost a Frisian, and only secondly a Dutchman, this meant an orientation towards national Frisian ideals, from which emanated two goals he set himself in life. Firstly, he wanted to preserve the Western Frisian language by using it for writing again after it had been used almost exclusively as a spoken language for three centuries. From that it followed that he had to get the Frisians to read in their own language (otherwise, writing it would not be of much use), and that he should record the Frisian vocabulary in a dictionary, which would be the first dictionary ever of the Frisian language. And secondly, Halbertsma wanted to put renowned Frisian people from the past in the spotlight, to serve as an example for his contemporaries.

To attain his first goal, Halbertsma had to use his writings to penetrate the daily life of the Frisian people. This he achieved by authoring folk literature with his brother Eeltsje. The state and social status of the Western Frisian language at that time becomes clear if one observes the fact that Halbertsma and his brothers, though they laboured tirelessly for the use of Frisian as a written language for poetry and prose, lapsed into Dutch for their correspondence with each other, and apparently did not feel that was in any way strange. As Halbertsma remained the editor of Eeltsje's work for his entire life, their poetry and short fiction were strongly connected and published together from the very beginning. For that reason the linguist Foeke Buitenrust Hettema would describe Halbertsma later as the 'literary agent' of his brothers Eeltsje and Tsjalling. In 1822, their early works were collected under the title De Lapekoer fan Gabe Skroar ("Gabe Tailor's Rag Basket"; original, archaic spelling: De Lape Koer fen Gabe Skroor), a booklet consisting of 36 pages, and including six poems and one short story. This publication was attributed to the fictional 'Gabe Skroar', a lame farmer's son who became a tailor and a writer, but died young. This character was in all probability a creation of Eeltsje's. Hiding behind such a fictional author was fairly normal at that time.

The first edition of De Lapekoer fan Gabe Skroar, published in 1822, consisted of 200 copies only. Those were not sold, however, but at the expense of Halbertsma presented to acquaintances of his all over Friesland. In that way he awoke among his public a desire for more reading-matter of this nature. These stories and poems were in fact something entirely different from what the readers were used to, not only as to what language they were written in, but also and especially concerning their informal style. The copies of the booklet often were shared around through entire networks of family and friends, and not seldom the stories and poems were transcribed by hand before the booklet was given back or passed on.

A second, expanded edition of De Lapekoer fan Gabe Skroar, consisting of 237 pages, was published in 1829, followed by a third, further expanded edition in 1834, running to almost 500 pages of a larger size. After that, additions were published separately in 1836 (De Noarger Rún oan Gabe Skroar), 1840 (Twigen út in Alde Stamme), 1854 (Leed en Wille en de Flotgerzen), and 1858 (De Jonkerboer and Teltsjes fan de Wize Mannen fan Esonstêd). By the end of his life, Halbertsma assisted in the editing of a portion of Rimen en Teltsjes (Rhymes and Tales), the comprehensive publication in which all the Halbertsma Brothers' literary works were collected. He even wrote some new pieces for it, such as the short story It Grouwe Pak ("The Thick Suit").

As a writer, Halbertsma strongly sensed what the public needed, but at the same time he was a somewhat distant and cerebral author, which tended to have an averse effect on his poetry, especially compared to the poems of his brother Eeltsje, who was a much more emotional writer. Nevertheless, at least some of Halbertsma's poems, for instance Sibbel fan De Ryp ("Sibbel from De Ryp") and Nacht ("Night") have made a lasting impression. That said, Halbertsma's short stories were much more acute thanks to his limber use of language, his lively style of writing, and the fact that he refused to mince his words, leading to a rough, scoffing, and sometimes darkly grim atmosphere. His subject-matter Halbertsma collected from various sources, including German and French oral literature, which he matchlessly revised and placed in Friesland. He was a non-conformist, whose sharp judgments of the works of others made him far from universally loved. Before everything else, Halbertsma as a writer was an essayist and a satirist, who liked to include topical political and social questions in his literary works. From the anecdotes of people who knew or met him, he emerges as a sharp-witted and extremely diligent man of capacious erudition who was a droll story-teller.

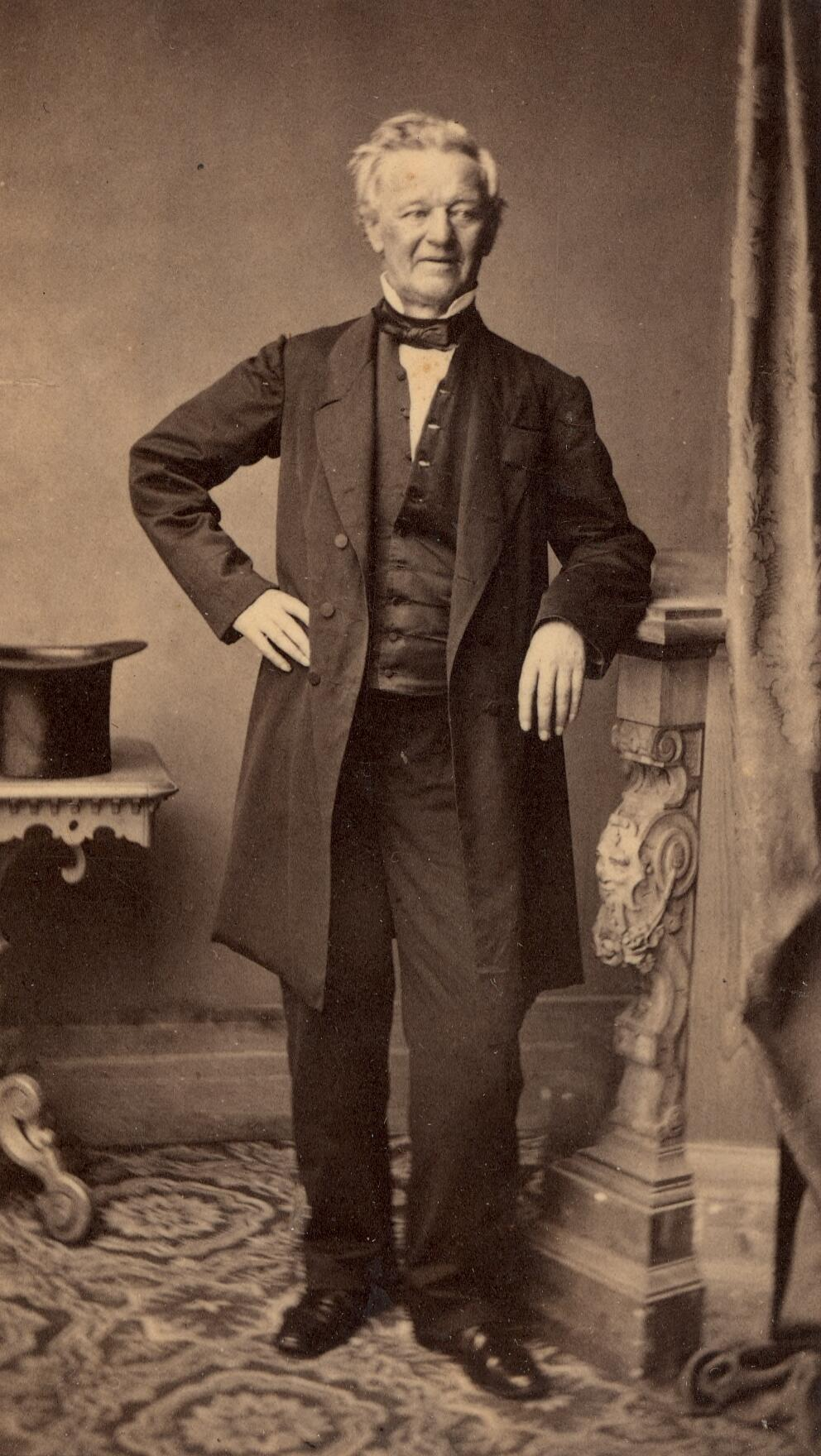
Justus Hiddes Halbertsma in a photograph dated 3 August 1861.

It Boalserter Nut ("The Bolsward Utility" – the name of a gentlemen's club), which was published in De Lapekoer, was Halbertsma's first short story of a more extended length. As is often the case with Halbertsma's stories, it consists of a frame-story in which several other more or less stand-alone components are absorbed, such as the essay It Jild ("The Money"). Miswier ("Continuously Bad Weather") and De Twadde Jûn ("The Second Evening") are also extensive frame-stories, and De Skearwinkel fan Joutebaas ("Boss Joute's Barbershop") is a dialogue, which includes the intriguing and completely stand-alone story Heksershol ("Hole of Witchcraft" – an old nickname for the village of Molkwerum). The only time Halbertsma wrote a literary work entirely without the participation of Eeltsje, was in 1837, when he published Oan Eölus ("To Aeolus"), a story inspired by a great storm in 1830, in which a tornado has blown thoughts and motifs together like whirling leaves. Oan Eölus could perhaps be seen as a clue that Halbertsma harboured greater literary aspirations than would fit in the De Lapekoer fan Gabe Skroar.

=== As a man of science ===
And yet, for all that, Halbertsma's literary works did not take centerstage in his life: that place was reserved for his scientific non-fiction books. More than fifty years he laboured to complete his dictionary of Western Frisian titled Lexicon Frisicum, for which he chose Latin as the descriptive language, but it remained unfinished. He organised it along the lines of the German dictionary by the Brothers Grimm, but became enmeshed in the addition of insertions and in reworkings, and in writing long semantic etymologies, a part of the work for which he especially had a predilection. In the end, he never got past the letter F, and the dictionary remained a manuscript, which was published in its unfinished form after Halbertsma's death, in 1872. In the 20th century, the material Halbertsma gathered for his Lexicon Frisicum was used by de Frisian Academy to develop several Western Frisian dictionaries, notably the 25 part Wurdboek fan de Fryske Taal ("Dictionary of the Western Frisian Language"; published 1984–2011).

Furthermore, Halbertsma was the driving force behind the commemoration of the life of the famous 17th century Frisian poet Gysbert Japiks in 1823, which is seen by some as the starting point of the Frisian Movement. Afterwards he published an extensive literary history work under the title Hulde aan Gysbert Japiks ("Hail to Gysbert Japiks") in two parts in 1824 and 1827. In 1829 Halbertsma wrote Het Geslacht der Van Harens ("The Lineage of the Van Harens"), in which he primarily described the lives and literary works of the brothers and 18th century Dutch-language writers from Friesland Onno Zwier van Haren and Willem van Haren, whose work he admired greatly.

Halbertsma was also the author of an 1836 biography of the Frisian poet Jan Cornelis Pieters Salverda (1783–1836), which almost has a naturalistic feel to it. In 1843 he published a historical work about the Mennonites, called De Doopsgezinden en Hunne Herkomst ("The Mennonites and Their Origins"), and in 1851 he followed this up with Aanteekeningen op het Vierde Deel van den Spiegel Historiael van Jacob van Maerlant ("Notes on Part Four of the Spiegel Historiael by Jacob van Maerlant). Furthermore, in 1858, at the request of Prince Louis Lucien Bonaparte, whom he had met in London, Halbertsma published It Ewangeelje fen Matthewes, which was the first Frisian translation of the Biblical Gospel of Matthew (or of any gospel for that matter). This translation evoked a great deal of criticism from Halbertsma's contemporaries, who thought it was much too realistic; today, it still has an almost modern feel to it, showing that Halbertsma was far ahead of his time.

Halbertsma had a reputation of being an erudite man, which he won at a young age. He was especially known as a scholar of the Germanic languages, and to the present day he is widely acknowledged to have been a larger-than-life figure in the field of linguistics. Shortly after returning to Friesland from his study in Amsterdam, friends from his student years who by then were occupying important posts within the civil service, introduced him to the social circles around the Frisian-minded provincial governor jonker Idsert Aebinga van Humalda. Later in life Halbertsma was acquainted with prominent Dutch literary figures, such as Willem Bilderdijk, and what's more, he maintained a lively correspondence with European greats, like the Danish linguist Rasmus Rask, the English poet Robert Southey, and the German linguist and fairytale-collector Jacob Grimm. Moreover, he was invited to join learned historical and linguistic societies in Leiden, Copenhagen, Berlin, Athens en Halle-Wittenberg.

Hence Halbertsma expected to be appointed professor of Dutch language and literature, and several times such an appointment seemed almost within his grasp, but each time it slipped away. His sharp pen probably played a role in this, but there were other reasons, too. In 1830, he lost out from the surplus of applicants washing over the Netherlands from the universities of Belgium, which at that time had just seceded from the United Kingdom of the Netherlands, and after 1840 a different type of scientist was called for, with a more specialised knowledge than Halbertsma commanded. That in 1837 he was awarded an honorary doctorate in literature by the University of Leiden, was scant consolation to him. In part because of these disappointments, Halbertsma balanced on the edge of a burn-out for a long time, and especially in 1839, when he was passed over yet again, he went through a deep crisis. It was only in the 1860s, when he was in his seventies, that he seems to have achieved a state of mental composure.

In part because of his linguistic erudition, Halbertsma has been named as the author of the infamous Oera Linda Book, a falsified work which emerged in 1867 and was written in imitated Old Frisian. It pretended to be an early history of Friesland and the Frisian people, and for a while it was considered authentic, until it was exposed as a hoax. However, it is considered much more likely that the true author of the Oera Linda Book was the librarian Eelco Verwijs, who lead the Provincial Library of Friesland and who had befriended Halbertsma, or possibly the writer François Haverschmidt or the ship carpenter and self-taught freethinker Cornelis over de Linden. If Verwijs was the culprit, it is not thought to be impossible that Halbertsma tacitly or even openly provided him with advice.

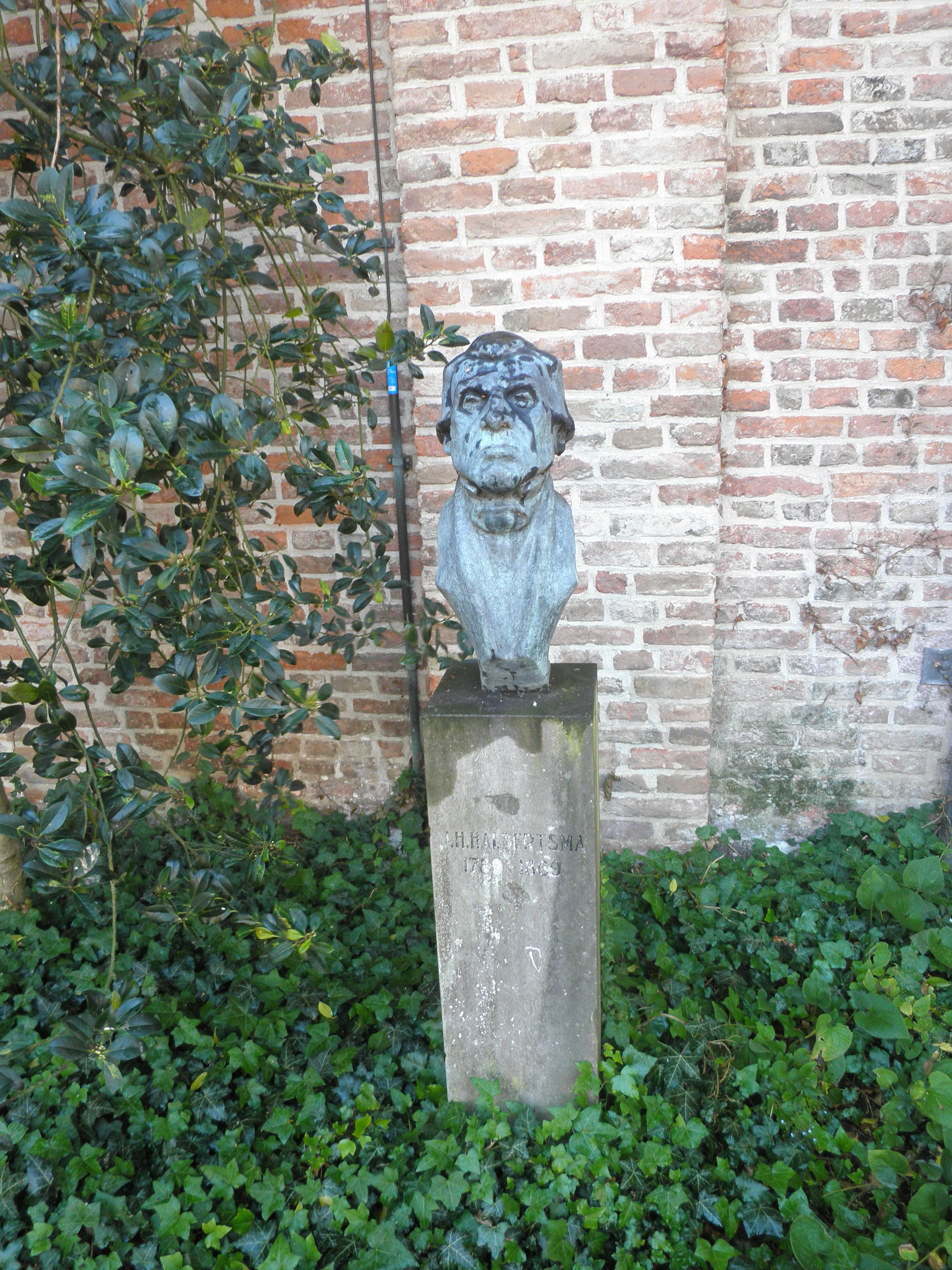
Bust in bronze of Justus Hiddes Halbertsma in Deventer.

=== Death ===
After his retirement, on 26 October 1856, which Halbertsma applied for himself because his heart was not in his duties as a minister anymore, he withdrew into his upstairs apartment, where from that point on he became increasingly more lonely as his family members and friends died away, although his foreign contacts through correspondence remained intact. Justus Hiddes Halbertsma died in Deventer on 27 February 1869, when he was 79 years of age. By that time he had been a widower for 22 years. He was survived by his sons Watse and Tsjalling. In 1947, the Dr. Joast Halbertsma Award, the highest provincial decoration in the field of historical (and later more general scientific) research concerning the province of Friesland was named in his honour.

== Legacy ==
After the death of all three Brothers Halbertsma, their short fiction and poetry was gathered under the supervision of librarian and archivist Gerben Colmjon and bookseller and historian Wopke Eekhoff. In 1871, it was published by the firm of J. de Lange in Deventer, under the title of Rimen en Teltsjes ("Rhymes and Tales"). This work is now thought of as the national book of Western Frisian literature, and although the literary value of this collection was later disputed by some critics, it is undeniable that Rimen en Teltsjes and its predecessor De Lapekoer fan Gabe Skroar played a role of crucial importance in the development of a new literary tradition after Frisian had been used almost exclusively as a spoken language for three centuries. Justus Hiddes Halbertsma's influence on subsequent Western Frisian literature was enormous and of incalculable value. In 1949, author and literary critic Anne Wadman wrote that the Halbertsmas gave "the Western Frisian people a literary monument, in which it saw its own life as a nation [...] reflected." As of today Rimen en Teltsjes still occupies the first slot in the ranking of Western Frisian literary classics.

On his travels to England, Scotland, and Ireland, in 1852 and 1853, Halbertsma was impressed by the number of museums and cabinets of antiquities there were. This provided him with the idea to transfer his own collection of antiquities (originating for a major part in Hindeloopen, while the remainder came mostly from excavations of Frisian terps) to the Province of Friesland. In 1853, the Cabinet of Antiquities of Friesland was formed out of his collection, which in 1881 became the Frisian Museum.

Halbertsma also gave to the Province of Friesland, in part when he was still alive, his extensive library of scientific books, which was added to the Provincial Library of Friesland, en is to this day available for scientific research purposes at Tresoar. A large collection of letters written by and to Halbertsma, including hundreds to his brothers Eeltsje en Tsjalling, long remained in the custody of the Halbertsma family, until they were given, in the course of the 20th century, on permanent loan to the Frisian Literary Museum and Documentation Centre (FLMD), which became part of Tresoar in 2002.

== Bibliography ==
=== Literary works ===
(for the most part in Western Frisian)

- 1822 – De Lapekoer fan Gabe Skroar ("Gabe Tailor's Rag Basket"; collection of poetry and short stories, with Eeltsje Hiddes Halbertsma)
- 1829 – De Lapekoer fan Gabe Skroar (collection of poetry and short stories, with Eeltsje Hiddes Halbertsma; expanded version)
- 1830 – In Nij Liet op Grouster Merke ("New Song about the Fair in Grou"; poem)
- 1831 – In Skotsk Miel ("A Scottish Meal"; short story)
- 1834 – Foeke Sjoerds (short story about the historical 18th century Frisian writer Foeke Sjoerds)
- 1834 – Grêfskrift fan in Wynsûper op Him Selme ("Epitaph of a Wine-guzzler for Himself"; poem)
- 1834 – De Lapekoer fan Gabe Skroar (collection of poetry and short stories, with Eeltsje Hiddes Halbertsma; further expanded version)
- 1834 – Sûn Ferstân ("Sane of Mind"; short story)
- 1835 – De Skearwinkel fan Joutebaas ("Boss Joute's Barbershop"; frame-story with several poems and short stories, with Eeltsje Hiddes Halbertsma en Tsjalling Hiddes Halbertsma)
- 1836 – De Noarger Rún oan Gabe Skroar ("The Gelding from Norg to Gabe Tailor"; short story with a poem by Eeltsje Hiddes Halbertsma, including commentary by Justus Hiddes Halbertsma)
- 1836 – De Treemter fan it Sint-Anthonygasthûs ("The Conversation Room of St. Anthony's Hospital"; short story by Eeltsje Hiddes Halbertsma, including commentary by Justus Hiddes Halbertsma)
- 1837 – Oan Eölus ("To Aeolus"; short story)
- 1837 – Eölus, Grewa fan Stoarm en Onwaar ("Aeolus, Lord of Storm and Thunder"; collection of poetry and short stories, with Eeltsje Hiddes Halbertsma)
- 1840 – Twigen út in Alde Stamme ("Twigs from an Old Trunk"; collection of poetry and short stories, with Eeltsje Hiddes Halbertsma)
- 1841 – Oan Petrus, Doe't er Doktor Waard ("To Petrus, When He Took His Doctor's Degree"; poems by Eeltsje Hiddes Halbertsma and Ferdinand Hanthal, with commentary by Justus Hiddes Halbertsma)
- 1854 – Leed en Wille en de Flotgerzen ("Grief and Pleasure and Down Upon the Lee Shore"; collection of poetry and short stories, with Eeltsje Hiddes Halbertsma)
- 1871 – It Grouwe Pak ("The Thick Suit"; short story)
- 1871 – Rimen en Teltsjes ("Rhymes and Tales"; collection of poetry and short stories, with Eeltsje Hiddes Halbertsma en Tsjalling Hiddes Halbertsma)
- 18?? – De Geboarteleppel ("The Birth Spoon"; short story)
- 18?? – De Fûgel fan Bearn-poep ("German Bearn's Bird"; short story)
- 18?? – De Bear op Reis ("The Bear on a Journey"; short story)

=== Scientific works ===
(for the most part in Dutch)

- 1824 – Hulde aan Gysbert Japiks ("Hail to Gysbert Japiks"; part 1; about life and works of the 17th century Frisian poet Gysbert Japiks)
- 1827 – Hulde aan Gysbert Japiks (part 2)
- 1829 – Het Geslacht der Van Harens ("The Lineage of the Van Harens"; primarily about the life and works of the 18th century Frisian (Dutch-language) poets and writers Onno Zwier van Haren and Willem van Haren)
- 1834 – Friesche Spelling en Proeve van Vergelijking tusschen de Boven Ontworpene Spelling en Die van Gysbert Japicx ("Frisian Spelling and Comparison of the Newly Developed Spelling and That of Gysbert Japicx"; about the spelling of the Western Frisian language)
- 1836 – Friesic: Ancient and Modern Friesic Compared with Anglo-Sacon
- 1836 – Jan Cornelis Pieters Salverda (biography of the 18th century Friesian poet Jan Cornelis Pieters Salverda)
- 1836 – De Toenemende Wansmaak van de Nederlanders voor het Toneel ("The Increasingly Bad Taste of the Dutch in Their Theatre"; about the quality of Dutch theatre drama)
- 1840 – Letterkundige Naoogst ("Literary After-Harvest"; part 1)
- 1843 – Het Buddhisme en Zijn Stichter ("Buddhism and Its Founder"; about buddhism)
- 1843 – De Doopsgezinden en Hunne Herkomst ("The Mennonites and Their Origins"; about the mennonites)
- 1845 – Letterkundige Naoogst (part 2)
- 1846 – De Tongvallen in Nederland ("Dialects in the Netherlands"; about dialects spoken in the Netherlands)
- 1851 – Aanteekeningen op het Vierde Deel van den Spiegel Historiael van Jacob van Maerlant ("Notes on the Part Four of the Spiegel Historiael by Jacob van Maerlant"; about the Spiegel Historiael, by Jacob van Maerlant)
- 1858 – It Ewangeelje fen Matthewes ("The Gospel of Matthew"; translation of the Gospel of Matthew to Western Frisian)
- 1861 – Levensberigten der in Dit Jaar Afgestorvene Medeleden: Bericht wegens Rinse Posthumus, in Leven Kerkleeraar bij de Hervormde Gemeenten van Waaxens en Brantgum in Friesland ("Biographical Notices of the Members Who Died This Year: Notice for Rinse Posthumus, in Life Minister of the Reformed Congregations of Waaxens and Brantgum in Friesland", in: Jaarboek van de Maatschappij der Nederlandse Letterkunde, "Yearbook of the Dutch Literary Society"; obituary of the poet Rinse Posthumus)
- 1869 – Biografie van Deventer ("Biography of Deventer"; sarcastic description of the city of Deventer and its inhabitants)
- 1872 – Lexicon Frisicum (unfinished dictionary of the Western Frisian language)
- 1969 – Kent Gij Halbertsma van Deventer? In Tal Net Utjowne Hânskriften ("Knowest Thou Halbertsma from Deventer? A Number of Unpublished Manuscripts"; collection of unpublished works)

== Sources ==
- Boelens, Krine, et al., Twataligens: Ynlieding yn Underskate Aspekten fan de Twataligens, Leeuwarden (Afûk), 1981, ISBN 9 06 27 30 086.
- Breuker, Philippus H., Oer Skriuwers, Boek en Utjeften, in: Halbertsma, Brothers, Rimen en Teltsjes, Drachten (A.J. Osinga Utjouwerij), 1993, ISBN 9 06 06 64 892, pp. 587–613.
- Breuker, Philippus H., Halbertsma, Justus (Joost Hiddes), in: Schroor, Meindert, ed., Nieuwe Encyclopedie van Fryslân, Gorredijk/Leeuwarden (Utjouwerij Bornmeer/Tresoar), 2016, ISBN 978-9 05 61 53 755, pp. 1126–1127.
- Dykstra, Klaes, and Bouke Oldenhof, Lyts Hânboek fan de Fryske Literatuer, Leeuwarden (Afûk), 1997, ISBN 9 07 00 10 526.
- Halbertsma, Brothers, Rimen en Teltsjes, Bolsward/Leeuwarden (A.J. Osinga Utjouwerij/R. van der Velde), 1958, no ISBN.
- Halbertsma, Brothers, Rimen en Teltsjes, Drachten (A.J. Osinga Utjouwerij), 1993, ISBN 9 06 06 64 892.
- Hemminga, Piet, Fryslân: Fêstens en Feroaring, in: Hiemstra, Sytze T., De Fryslannen, Leeuwarden (Frisian Council/Afûk), 2008, ISBN 978-9 06 27 37 734.
- Jensma, Goffe, Cultuur in Friesland en Friese Cultuur, 1795–1917, in: Frieswijk, Johan, et al., ed., Geschiedenis van Friesland 1750–1995, Amsterdam/Leeuwarden (Uitgeverij Boom/Fryske Akademy), 1998, ISBN 9 05 35 23 685, pp. 172–212.
- Oppewal, Teake, and Pier Boorsma, Spiegel van de Friese Poëzie: Van de Zeventiende Eeuw tot Heden, Amsterdam (J.M. Meulenhoff B.V.), 1994, ISBN 9 02 90 47 569.
- Rademaker-Helfferich, B., Joost Hiddes Halbertsma (1789–1869), in: Overijselse Biografieën.
- Schroor, Meindert, ed., Nieuwe Encyclopedie van Fryslân, Gorredijk/Leeuwarden (Utjouwerij Bornmeer/Tresoar), 2016, ISBN 978-9 05 61 53 755.
- Terpstra, Pieter, Tweeduizend Jaar Geschiedenis van Friesland, Leeuwarden (Uitgeverij M.Th. van Seyen), no year, no ISBN.
- Twerda, Hendrik, Fan Fryslâns Forline, Bolsward (A.J. Osinga N.V.), 1968, no ISBN.
- Wadman, Anne, Frieslands Dichters, Leiden (L. Stafleu), 1949, no ISBN.
- Wiersma, J.P., Foarwurd and De Bruorren Halbertsma, in: Halbertsma, Brothers, Rimen en Teltsjes, Bolsward (A.J. Osinga N.V.), 1958, pp. 5–14.
