= Brothers Halbertsma =

West Frisian literary family

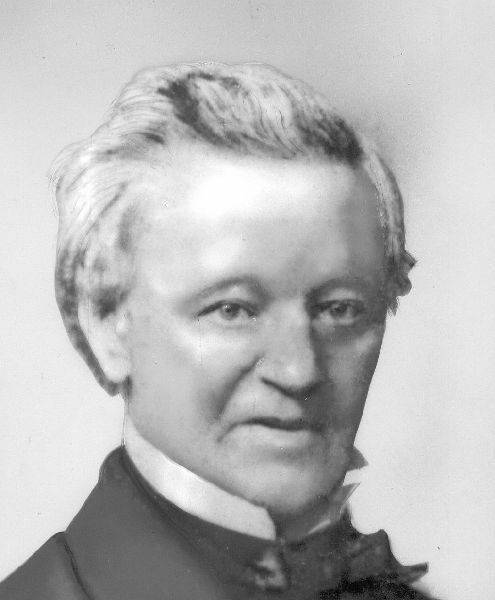
Justus Hiddes Halbertsma.

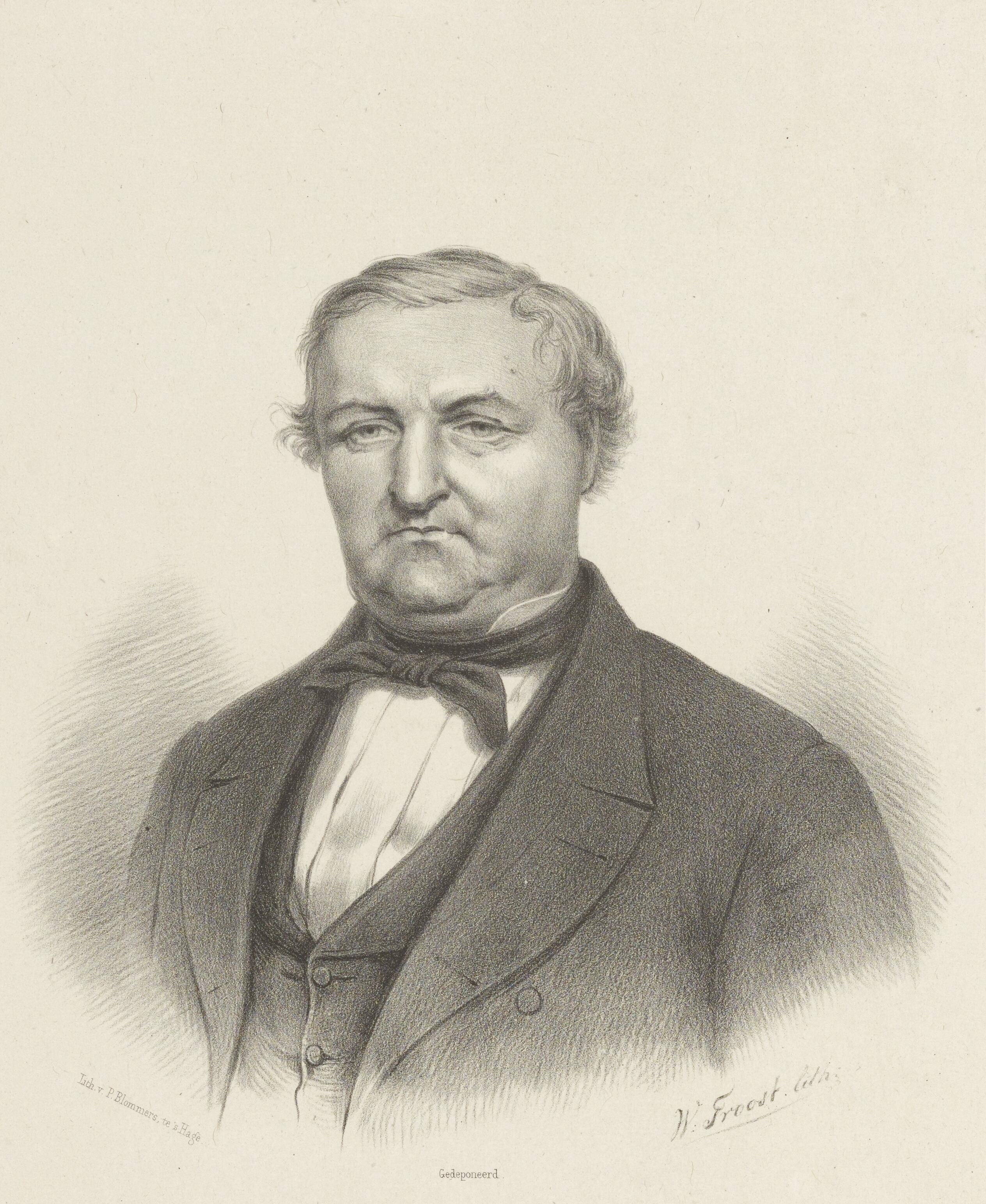
Eeltsje Hiddes Halbertsma.

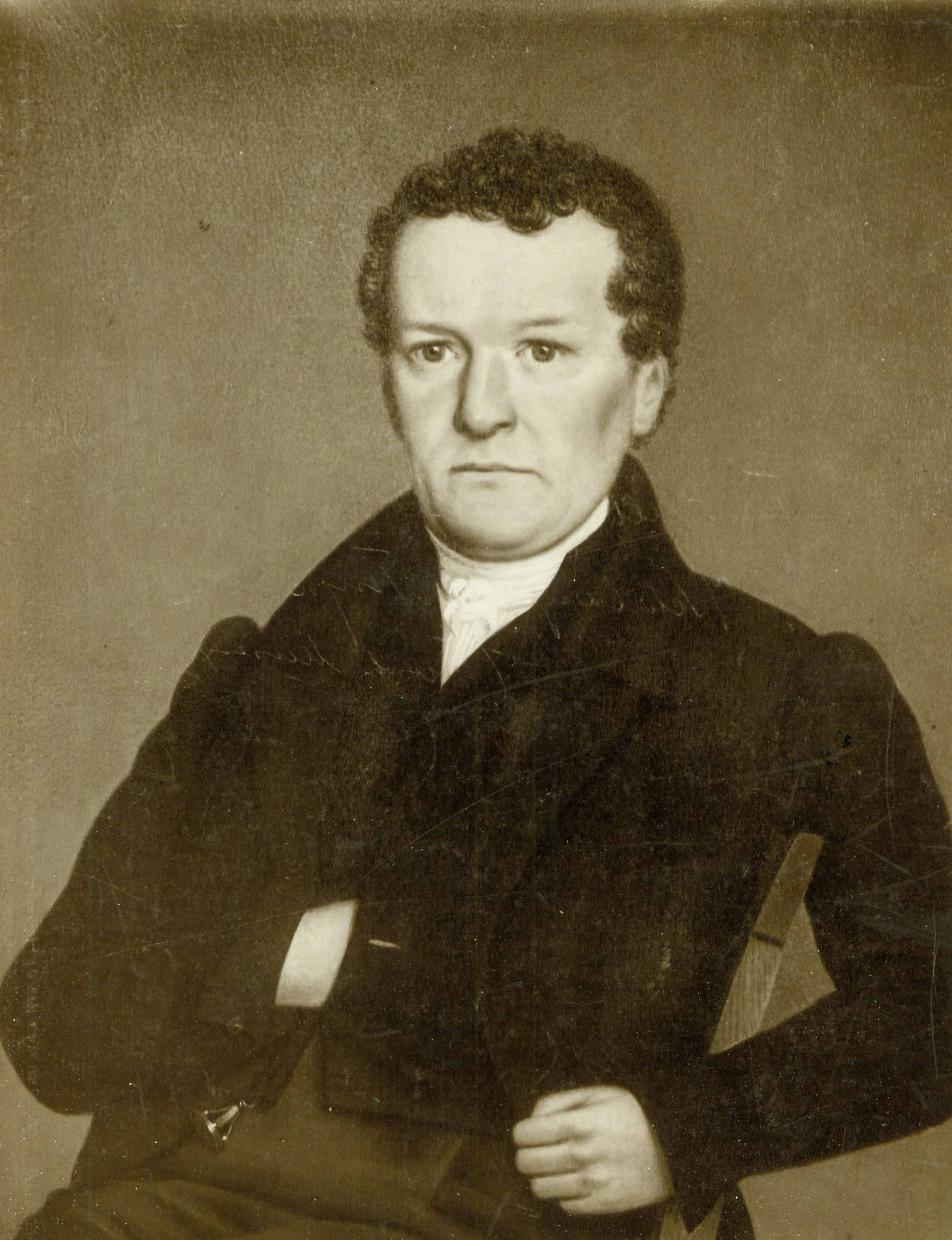
Tsjalling Hiddes Halbertsma.

The Brothers Halbertsma, members of the Halbertsma family, were three brothers born in the Frisian village of Grou towards the end of the 18th century, who played a role of crucial importance for the development of a written literature in the Western Frisian language. These three brothers were:

- Justus (or Joast) Hiddes Halbertsma (1789–1869). He studied theology in Amsterdam, and afterwards was a Mennonite minister in Bolsward and since 1822 in Deventer. He was a somewhat distant and cerebral author of short stories and poems. In his works ideas were more important than emotions. Besides his literary achievements he was also a scholar of linguistics, and with his (unfinished) Lexicon Frisicum he took the first step towards the composition of a dictionary of the Western Frisian language.
- Tsjalling Hiddes Halbertsma (1792–1852). He kept their father's bakery running after the untimely death of both their parents in 1809, later becoming an international merchant in dairy products (mainly butter and cheese). He lived in Grou his entire life, and wrote for the most part humorous rhymes and poems. Those were generally not of the same literary quality as his brothers' works, but became quite popular with the common man.
- Eeltsje Hiddes Halbertsma (1797–1858). He studied medicine in Leiden and Heidelberg, and became a physician in Grou. His poems and short stories were much more emotional than those of his brother Justus, and his poetry in particular is still very much admired. His oeuvre included the poem De Alde Friezen, which in 1875 became the national anthem of the Western Frisian people.

Apart from these three writers, who are usually meant when speaking of the 'Brothers Halbertsma', there was a fourth brother, who did not produce any literary work:

- Binnert Hiddes Halbertsma (1795–1847). He took over the family bakery which had been kept going by his brother Tsjalling until he was old enough, and became a baker in Grou. Later he sold the bakery and started a new business trading in staves for wooden barrels. Under the leadership of his son Hidde Binnerts Halbertsma and his grandson Pieter Goslik Halbertsma this company evolved into Halbertsma Houtbewerking N.V., which was taken over in 1990, and since is part of the Faber Halbertsma Group.

The Brothers Halbertsma were all born in the house of their parents on Kowemerk ("Cow Market") street in Grou, a village in the central part of the Dutch province of Friesland. They were sons of the baker and small-time merchant Hidde Joasts Halbertsma (1756–1809) and his wife Ruerdtsje (or Riurtk) Tsjallings Binnerts (1767–1809). Two children who were born later died in early childhood, the little boy in 1803, and the little girl in 1805. Justus, Tsjalling and Eeltsje were much like their father, while Binnert more resembled their mother.

Ruerdtsje Binnerts was a scion of a prominent family in Grou. Her people were Mennonites, and although her husband had been raised a Calvinist, he converted after marrying her. From Justus' letters Ruerdtsje emerges as a smart businesswoman, a loving mother, and a deeply religious person. About Hidde Halbertsma, the father, much less is known. It is thought that he might have been a mariner before his marriage. He is described as a gentle soul, who was, however, apt to take offence, and could be quite sharp-tongued in such cases. In 1784, he published a long Dutch-language poem under the title Schrikkelijke IJsgang en Overstroominge in Gelderland ("Terrible Ice-drift and Flooding in Gelderland"). From this intriguing work it is clear that his sons' literary talents were a family trait.

The Brothers Halbertsma were very close, possibly as a consequence of the fact that both their parents died at a relatively young age in 1809, when Justus was just twenty years of age, Tsjalling seventeen, Binnert thirteen, and Eeltsje only eleven. Later, Justus and Eeltsje started to write short fiction and poetry which can be considered folk literature. As Justus acted as editor for Eeltsje's work for his entire life, their poetry and prose were strongly connected from the very beginning and for the most part published together. For that reason the linguist Foeke Buitenrust Hettema would later describe Halbertsma as the 'literary agent' of his brothers Eeltsje and Tsjalling.

In 1822, Justus and Eeltsje's early works were collected under the title De Lapekoer fan Gabe Skroar ("Gabe Tailor's Rag Basket"), a booklet consisting of 36 pages, and including six poems and one short story. This publication was attributed to the fictional 'Gabe Skroar', a lame farmer's son who became a tailor and a writer, but died young. This character was in all probability a creation of Eeltsje's. Hiding behind such a fictional author was fairly normal at that time. A second, expanded edition of De Lapekoer fan Gabe Skroar, consisting of 237 pages, was published in 1829, followed by a third, further expanded edition in 1834, running to almost 500 pages of a larger size.

After that, additions were published separately in 1836 (De Noarger Rún oan Gabe Skroar), 1840 (Twigen út in Alde Stamme), 1854 (Leed en Wille en de Flotgerzen), and 1858 (De Jonkerboer and Teltsjes fan de Wize Mannen fan Esonstêd). Eventually, contributions by the third brother, Tsjalling, were also inserted. After the death of all three Brothers Halbertsma, their short fiction and poetry was gathered under the supervision of librarian and archivist Gerben Colmjon and bookseller and historian Wopke Eekhoff. In 1871, it was published by the firm of J. de Lange in Deventer, under the title of Rimen en Teltsjes ("Rhymes and Tales").

This work is now thought of as the national book of Western Frisian literature, and although the literary value of this collection was later disputed by some critics, it is undeniable that Rimen en Teltsjes and its predecessor De Lapekoer fan Gabe Skroar played a role of crucial importance in the development of a new literary tradition after Frisian had been used almost exclusively as a spoken language for three centuries. In 1949, author and literary critic Anne Wadman wrote that the Halbertsmas gave "the Western Frisian people a literary monument, in which it saw its own life as a nation [...] reflected." As of today Rimen en Teltsjes still occupies the first slot in the ranking of Western Frisian literary classics.

== Sources ==
- Breuker, Philippus H., Oer Skriuwers, Boek en Utjeften, in: Halbertsma, Brothers, Rimen en Teltsjes, Drachten (A.J. Osinga Utjouwerij), 1993, ISBN 9 06 06 64 892, pp. 587–613.
- Dykstra, Klaes, and Bouke Oldenhof, Lyts Hânboek fan de Fryske Literatuer, Leeuwarden (Afûk), 1997, ISBN 9 07 00 10 526.
- Halbertsma, Brothers, Rimen en Teltsjes, Bolsward/Leeuwarden (A.J. Osinga Utjouwerij/R. van der Velde), 1958, no ISBN.
- Halbertsma, Brothers, Rimen en Teltsjes, Drachten (A.J. Osinga Utjouwerij), 1993, ISBN 9 06 06 64 892.
- Hemminga, Piet, Fryslân: Fêstens en Feroaring, in: Hiemstra, Sytze T., De Fryslannen, Leeuwarden (Frisian Council/Afûk), 2008, ISBN 978-9 06 27 37 734.
- Jensma, Goffe, Cultuur in Friesland en Friese Cultuur, 1795–1917, in: Frieswijk, Johan, et al., ed., Geschiedenis van Friesland 1750–1995, Amsterdam/Leeuwarden (Uitgeverij Boom/Fryske Akademy), 1998, ISBN 9 05 35 23 685, pp. 172–212.
- Oppewal, Teake, and Pier Boorsma, Spiegel van de Friese Poëzie: Van de Zeventiende Eeuw tot Heden, Amsterdam (J.M. Meulenhoff B.V.), 1994, ISBN 9 02 90 47 569.
- Schroor, Meindert, ed., Nieuwe Encyclopedie van Fryslân, Gorredijk/Leeuwarden (Utjouwerij Bornmeer/Tresoar), 2016, ISBN 978-9 05 61 53 755.
- Terpstra, Pieter, Tweeduizend Jaar Geschiedenis van Friesland, Leeuwarden (Uitgeverij M.Th. van Seyen), no year, no ISBN.
- Twerda, Hendrik, Fan Fryslâns Forline, Bolsward (A.J. Osinga N.V.), 1968, no ISBN.
- Wadman, Anne, Frieslands Dichters, Leiden (L. Stafleu), 1949, no ISBN.
- Wiersma, J.P., Foarwurd and De Bruorren Halbertsma, in: Halbertsma, Brothers, Rimen en Teltsjes, Bolsward (A.J. Osinga N.V.), 1958, pp. 5–14.
