= Tsjalling Hiddes Halbertsma =

Dutch writer (1792–1852)

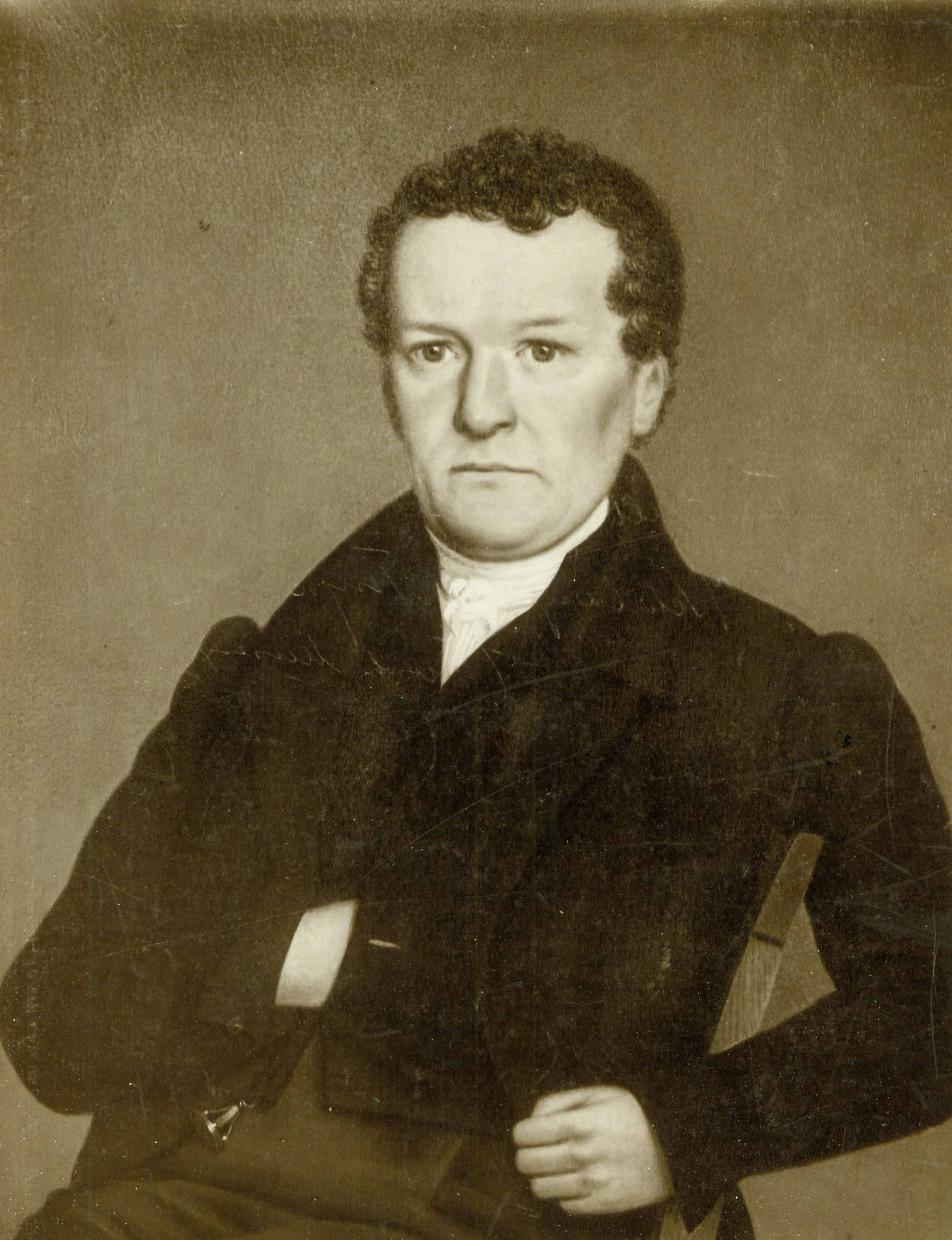
- Born: 21 January 1792; Grou, Netherlands
- Died: 12 December 1852 (aged 60); Grou, Netherlands
- Citizenship: Dutch
- Occupations: Merchant, poet, writer
- Spouse(s): Tetsje Sollema (m. 1813; died 1836) Reinskje van der Goot (m. 1837)
- Writing career
- Language: West Frisian, Dutch
- Years active: 1817–41
- Period: 19th century
- Genres: Poetry, short stories
- Notable work: Rimen en Teltsjes
- Movement: Romanticism

Tsjalling Hiddes Halbertsma (West Frisian: [ˈtsjɔlɪŋ ˈhɪdəs ˈhɔlbǝtsma]; Dutch: Tjalling Hiddes Halbertsma [ˈtɕɑlɪŋ ˈɦɪdəs ˈɦɑlbǝrtsmaː]; 21 January 1792 – 12 December 1852) was a Dutch Frisian writer, poet and merchant, and the least well-known of the three Brothers Halbertsma. During his life he won a certain amount of fame in and around Grou, for the poems and short stories he wrote, and also because of his success as a businessman. After his death some of his literary works were collected with those of his brothers Justus and Eeltsje to be published in 1871 as the famous Rimen en Teltsjes. It was only from 1918 onwards that more of Tsjalling Halbertsma's works were added to this collection.

== Life ==
=== Youth and background ===
Tsjalling Hiddes Halbertsma was born on 21 January 1792 in his parents' house on Kowemerk ("Cow Market") street in the village of Grou, in the central part of the Dutch province of Friesland. He was the son of the baker and small-time merchant Hidde Joasts Halbertsma (1756–1809) and his wife Ruerdtsje (or Riurtk) Tsjallings Binnerts (1767–1809). He had one elder brother, Justus (1789–1869), and two younger brothers, Binnert (1795–1847), and Eeltsje (1797–1858). Two children who were born later died in early childhood, the little boy in 1803, and the little girl in 1805. The brothers were very close, possibly as a consequence of the fact that both their parents died at a relatively young age in 1809, when Tsjalling was only seventeen years of age. Justus, Tsjalling and Eeltsje, who, as authors, became known as the Brothers Halbertsma later in life, were much like their father, while Binnert more resembled their mother.

This mother, Ruerdtsje Binnerts, was a scion of a prominent family in Grou. Her people were Mennonites, and although her husband had been raised a Calvinist, he converted after marrying her. From the letters of Tsjalling's brother Justus, Ruerdtsje emerges as a smart businesswoman, a loving mother, and a deeply religious person. About Hidde Halbertsma, the father, much less is known. It is thought that he might have been a mariner before his marriage. He is described as a gentle soul, who was, however, apt to take offence, and could be quite sharp-tongued in such cases.

=== Nature ===
Tsjalling Halbertsma was, according to his brother Justus, an imitator of great skill, a trait he had inherited from their father. Justus also wrote about him, "There was no greater lover of silliness and jokes in all of Friesland than my brother Tsjalling; but, mark this, always in the wasted hours. When it was time for business, all of the joking stopped, and then activity, policy, hard work and calculations were the order of the day from early in the morning to late in the evening." One of his biographers (J. P. Wiersma) described Tsjalling Halbertsma as "a talented, conspicuous person, full of drollery, not without vanity, but original in thought and word, distinctive in all his doings, a trendsetter." A different biographer (G. A. Wumkes) wrote about him: "Here the pen is wielded by a man of high character."

=== Trade ===
When Hidde Halbertsma died, in January 1809, and was followed in death by his wife Ruerdtsje Binnerts in December of that same year, the Brothers Halbertsma became orphans at a young age. Justus, the eldest brother, was in Amsterdam at that time, studying to become a minister, while Eeltsje, the youngest, was boarding in the provincial capital of Leeuwarden, where he attended the Latin school. In consequence, it fell to Tsjalling to keep their father's bakery running with the help of their father's baker's mates, until the third brother, Binnert, was old enough to take over the business.

After that, Tsjalling Halbertsma started to work for one of his uncles in Grou, who was a merchant trading in butter and cheese. At that time farmer's wives churned and made cheese at the farmstead, selling their products to merchants who traded it away, not seldom to foreign markets. In time, Halbertsma took over his uncle's company, which he expanded steadily over the course of many years. At first he worked on commission for the Amsterdam trading house of Pijnakker, but later on, he went into business for himself, buying up dairy products in Friesland and selling them with considerable profit in London. Halbertsma became a wealthy man, who, with his brother Binnert (who had sold the bakery and had become a wood merchant) and only ten others, such as Freerk Dirks Fontein of Harlingen, Michiel Hylkes Tromp of Woudsend, Hans Klazes Wouda of Sneek and Dirk Piers Zeper of Leeuwarden, was a member of the new Frisian Chamber of Commerce. Furthermore, from 1850 to his death, he had a seat in the provincial assembly of Friesland.

In 1837, Halbertsma had himself a large new house built in Grou, something his brothers were rather boastful of in their letters. He also dressed himself according to the latest fashion, leading to Eeltsje complaining, in 1841, that his brother had become a dandy. But in the end Halbertsma miscalculated badly: when the shares in other businesses he had invested in dropped sharply in value in 1848, he panicked, sold out, and put all his money in rye. When subsequently the rye market also collapsed, he suffered heavy losses amounting to about half of his fortune. This was a severe blow, especially to his ego, which he never truly recovered from.

=== Family ===
In 1813, Halbertsma married Tetsje Sjollema (1793–1836). She was from Grou, and he had known her for all of his life. A year after she died, he remarried, to Reinskje van der Goot (1807–1862), who was also from Grou. When this second marriage was contracted, he ordered fifty flags to be hung out in the village, and he gave away a fat cow to the poor. One of Halbertsma's sons from his first marriage, Johannes Tsjallings Halbertsma (1827–1884), took over the dairy trade after his father's death, and moved it to the city of Sneek. There Halbertsma's grandsons Hylke (1857–1932) and Herrius (1864–1920) established the dairy Normandia in 1888.

=== Authorship ===
Tsjalling Halbertsma began his career as a writer in 1817, on occasion of his brother Binnert's wedding. Afterwards, he wrote fairly regularly until 1835, with a clear peak around 1830, later followed by incidental writings until 1841. The last eleven years of his live he did not produce any new works. He ofted used the pseudonyms 'Master Jouke' and T.T., which was an abbreviation of 'Tsjalling Tsysker' ("Tsjalling Cheese-maker"). Halbertsma's literary works were always overshadowed to a large degree by those of his brothers Justus and Eeltsje; they consist of folk literature, often with a satirical or playful motif, which, however, was very popular with the common man. His Sets en Tsjerk yn Snitser Merk ("Sets and Tsjerk at the Fair yn Sneek") was almost a match for the more famous poem De Boalserter Merk ("The Bolsward Fair"), by his brother Eeltsje.

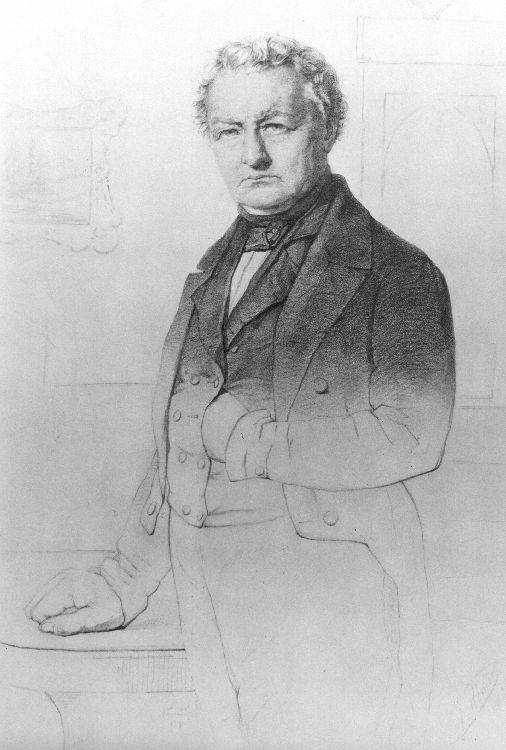
Tsjalling Hiddes Halbertsma.

Tsjalling Halbertsma's oeuvre was fairly limited, and consisted for a large part of rhymes written for the occasion of Shrove Tuesday and New Year's weigh-house notes, accompanying texts for prints, and fortune-telling notes, partly in West Frisian, but to a considerable degree, especially in the early years, in Dutch. Furthermore, it is known that, even before his brothers Justus and Eeltsje published their De Lapekoer fan Gabe Skroar in 1822, Tsjalling Halbertsma also wrote small tales and poems for a society in Grou. It is unclear what sort of society this was, but it seems very likely it was a remnant of a so-called 'people's society' from the French period, such as were established all over Friesland from 1795 on.

Halbertsma published a number of his works in almanacs, although this was limited, insofar as it can still be determined, to the period from 1829 to 1833. The first of his works he had printed in an almanac must have been Sets en Tsjerk yn Snitser Merk, which appeared in Suringar's Almanak for the year 1829. Gerard Tjaard Nicolaas Suringar himself would assert years later that De Bêste Freed yn Ljou'ter Merke ("The Best Friday of the Fair in Leeuwarden") was the first piece by Halbertsma which he had published, but he must have been mistaken, as it can be clearly shown from Justus Hiddes Halbertsma's letters that De Bêste Freed appeared in Suringar's Almanak of 1830. Completely apart from the rest of Halbertsma's works is De Roeker (modern spelling: De Rûker; "The Bouquet") a magazine which was edited by himself, and which included articles concerning topical subjects, but also some of his own tales and poems. Of this publication only a few volumes were published in 1832 and 1833.

=== Death ===
Tsjalling Hiddes Halbertsma died on 12 December 1852 in his birthplace of Grou, when he was almost 61 years old. When he was still alive, he had been the steadfast centre of the Halbertsmas of Grou, where his brothers Binnert and Eeltsje especially were often visiting and always welcome. According to his brother Justus, the family became "a scattered herd" after his death, and Eeltsje wrote to Justus: "I feel like a soldier who has seen his best comrade sink down next to him on the field of battle."

== Legacy ==
After the death of all three Brothers Halbertsma, their short fiction and poetry was gathered under the supervision of librarian and archivist Gerben Colmjon and bookseller and historian Wopke Eekhoff. In 1871, it was published by the firm of J. de Lange in Deventer, under the title of Rimen en Teltsjes ("Rhymes and Tales"). Apart from a few of his poems and his part in De Skearwinkel fan Joutebaas ("Boss Joute's Barbershop"), Tsjalling Halbertsma works, however, remained outside of that collection. It was not until the fourth reprint of Rimen en Teltsjes, which was published in 1918 by publisher and bookshop owner Rinse van der Velde from Leeuwarden, that the composition of the work was thoroughly adjusted. At that time Tsjalling's contribution took a more visible form through the absorption of De Wiersizzerij fan Maaike Jakkeles ("The Fortune-telling of Maaike Jakkeles") and a number of shorter texts and poems.

Today, Rimen en Teltsjes is seen as the national book of Western Frisian literature, and although the literary value of this collection was later disputed by some critics, it is undeniable that Rimen en Teltsjes and its predecessor De Lapekoer fan Gabe Skroar played a role of crucial importance in the development of a new literary tradition after Western Frisian had been used almost exclusively as a spoken language for three centuries. In 1949, author and literary critic Anne Wadman wrote that the Halbertsmas gave "the Western Frisian people a literary monument, in which it saw its own life as a nation [...] reflected." As of today Rimen en Teltsjes still occupies the first slot in the ranking of Western Frisian literary classics.

== Bibliography ==
(of Tsjalling Halbertsma's Western Frisian-language oeuvre)

- 1817 – Brulloftsfers of Mallichheid by de Brulloft ("Wedding Poem" or "Silliness at the Wedding"; poem)
- 1829 – Sets en Tsjerk yn Snitser Merk ("Sets and Tsjerk at the Fair yn Sneek; poem)
- 1829 – In Priuwke út Reintsje de Foks ("A Taste from Reintsje the Fox"; translated passage from Van den vos Reynaerde)
- 1829 – Sjirk en Tryn ("Sjirk and Tryn"; poem)
- 1830 – De Bêste Freed yn Ljou'ter Merke ("The Best Friday on the Fair in Leeuwarden; poem)
- 1830 – De Brune en de Bles ("The Brown and the Blaze"; short story)
- 1830 – Liet foar de Fryske Sjitterij ("Song for the Frisian Citizen Soldiery"; poem)
- 1830 – Myn Reis mei Parsop nei de Stêd ("My Journey to Town with Pear Juice"; short story)
- 1830 – De Skutter ("The Citizen Soldier"; poem)
- 1832 – In Jûnpraatsje fan Oark en Sint ("A Talk in the Evening with Oark and Sint; dialogue)
- 1832 – It Paad nei de Jilddobbe ("The Path to the Money Pit"; short story)
- 1833 – An Menhear Frisius Stripsma ("To Mr. Frisius Stripsma"; short story in the form of a letter and an answering letter, both in City Frisian dialect)
- 1833 – Punthûn en Liuwe Lijer ("Voluptuary and Leo Simpleton"; tale)
- 1834 – De Brulloft ("The Wedding"; dialogue)
- 1834 – De Divel ("The Devil"; tale)
- 1834 – Yn 't Jier Doe't de Ko Bartele Hjitte ("In the Year When the Cow Was Called Barthold"; tale)
- 1834 – Op in Jûn ("Of an Evening"; tale)
- 1835 – De Skearwinkel fan Joutebaas ("Boss Joute's Barbershop"; frame-story with several short stories and poems; with Justus Hiddes Halbertsma and Eeltsje Hiddes Halbertsma)
- 1835 – De Wiersizzerije fan Maaike Jakkeles ("The Fortune-telling of Maaike Jakkeles"; short story)
- 1837 – Yn de Grouster Weagerij ("In the Weigh-house of Grou"; speech)
- 1838 – Grouster Merk ("Fair in Grou"; speech)
- 1839 – Grouster Merke ("Fair in Grou"'; speech)
- 1840 – Grouster Merke ("Fair in Grou"; speech)
- 1841 – De Grouster Weachmasters oan de Merkegasten ("The Weigh-house Masters of Grou to the Visitors of the Fair"; speech)
- 1841 – Idaarder'diel ("Idaarderadeel", name of the historical municipality which included Grou; poem)
- 18?? – Master Doede fan Terbant Is Komd ("Master Doede of Terband Is Come"; tale)

== Sources ==
- Breuker, Philippus H., Oer Skriuwers, Boek en Utjeften, in: Halbertsma, Brothers, Rimen en Teltsjes, Drachten (A.J. Osinga Utjouwerij), 1993, ISBN 9 06 06 64 892, pp. 587–613.
- Breuker, Philippus H., Halbertsma, Tsjalling Hiddes, in: Schroor, Meindert, ed., Nieuwe Encyclopedie van Fryslân, Gorredijk/Leeuwarden (Utjouwerij Bornmeer/Tresoar), 2016, ISBN 978-9 05 61 53 755, p. 1128.
- Dykstra, Klaes, and Bouke Oldenhof, Lyts Hânboek fan de Fryske Literatuer, Leeuwarden (Afûk), 1997, ISBN 9 07 00 10 526, pp. 37–42.
- Halbertsma, Brothers, Rimen en Teltsjes, Bolsward/Leeuwarden (A.J. Osinga Utjouwerij/R. van der Velde), 1958, no ISBN.
- Halbertsma, Brothers, Rimen en Teltsjes, Drachten (A.J. Osinga Utjouwerij), 1993, ISBN 9 06 06 64 892.
- Hemminga, Piet, Fryslân: Fêstens en Feroaring, in: Hiemstra, Sytze T., De Fryslannen, Leeuwarden (Frisian Council/Afûk), 2008, ISBN 978-9 06 27 37 734.
- Jensma, Goffe, Cultuur in Friesland en Friese Cultuur, 1795–1917, in: Frieswijk, Johan, et al., red., Geschiedenis van Friesland 1750–1995, Amsterdam/Leeuwarden (Uitgeverij Boom/Fryske Akademy), 1998, ISBN 9 05 35 23 685, pp. 172–212.
- Oppewal, Teake, and Pier Boorsma, Spiegel van de Friese Poëzie: Van de Zeventiende Eeuw tot Heden, Amsterdam (J.M. Meulenhoff B.V.), 1994, ISBN 9 02 90 47 569.
- Schroor, Meindert, ed., Nieuwe Encyclopedie van Fryslân, Gorredijk/Leeuwarden (Utjouwerij Bornmeer/Tresoar), 2016, ISBN 978-9 05 61 53 755.
- Terpstra, Pieter, Tweeduizend Jaar Geschiedenis van Friesland, Leeuwarden (Uitgeverij M.Th. van Seyen), no year, no ISBN, pp. 312–323.
- Twerda, Hendrik, Fan Fryslâns Forline, Bolsward (A.J. Osinga N.V.), 1968, no ISBN, pp. 296–299.
- Wadman, Anne, Frieslands Dichters, Leiden (L. Stafleu), 1949, no ISBN.
- Wiersma, J.P., Foarwurd and De Bruorren Halbertsma, in: Halbertsma, Brothers, Rimen en Teltsjes, Bolsward (A.J. Osinga N.V.), 1958, pp. 5–14.
- Wumkes, Geart Aeilco, Bodders yn de Fryske Striid, Bolsward (A.J. Osinga N.V.), 1926, no ISBN.
