= Geschiedenis Magazine =

Dutch historical magazine

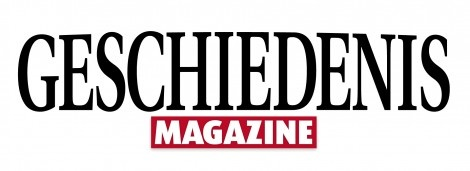

Geschiedenis Magazine is a Dutch popular historical magazine. It was first published as Spiegel Historiael in 1966 and appears under its current name since 2006, as a consequence of a modernization effort.

== History and profile ==
Geschiedenis Magazine was established with the intent of presenting historical articles to a broader, non-specialist audience (in a more journalistic style), though it contained articles by eminent historians such as Raoul Van Caenegem, F. W. N. Hugenholtz, and Arie van Deursen. The publisher was Fibula-Van Dishoeck. At first the magazine appeared eleven times per year, with many issues devoted to specific themes. It focused on Belgian history as well, and throughout the twentieth century always had Belgian members on the editorial board. The magazine appears eight times per year.

In 2005 Geschiedenis Magazine reported a circulation of 8000 copies (then nine times a year), and its office is in Amsterdam.
