= Willem van Haren =

Dutch poet, writer and politician (1710–1768)

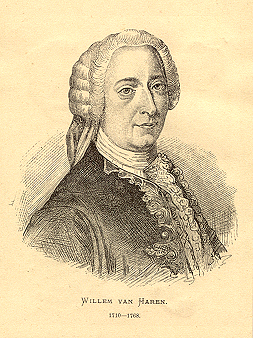

Jonkheer Willem van Haren (21 February 1710 - 4 July 1768) was a Dutch nobleman and poet. Van Haren was born in Leeuwarden and died in Sint-Oedenrode.

== Poetry ==
Haren's best known work was an epic poem, Friso, written in 1741. He has also created Het menschelijk leven, 1760, a review of his life and another epic poem: Gevallen van Friso (Amsterdam, 1741), in which he describes the fate of the first king of the Frisians.

His brother, Onno Zwier van Haren, was also a poet and wrote patriotic verses.
