= Eeltsje Boates Folkertsma =

West Frisian language writer and translator (1893–1968)

Eeltsje Boates Folkertsma (13 November 1893, Ferwert – 1 January 1968, Franeker) was a West Frisian language writer and a Protestant skilled as a translator. He worked with Geart Aeilco Wumkes in translating the Old Testament (West Frisian:Alde Testamint) in 1943.

The major work was carried out by Wumkes with the translation of the Bible in West Frisian with the New Testament (West Frisian: Nije Testamint) published in 1933 and the Old Testament (West Frisian: Alde Testamint) in 1943. The complete Bible was published in 1943 (West Frisian: Bibel).
