= Eeltsje Hiddes Halbertsma =

Frisian writer, poet and physician

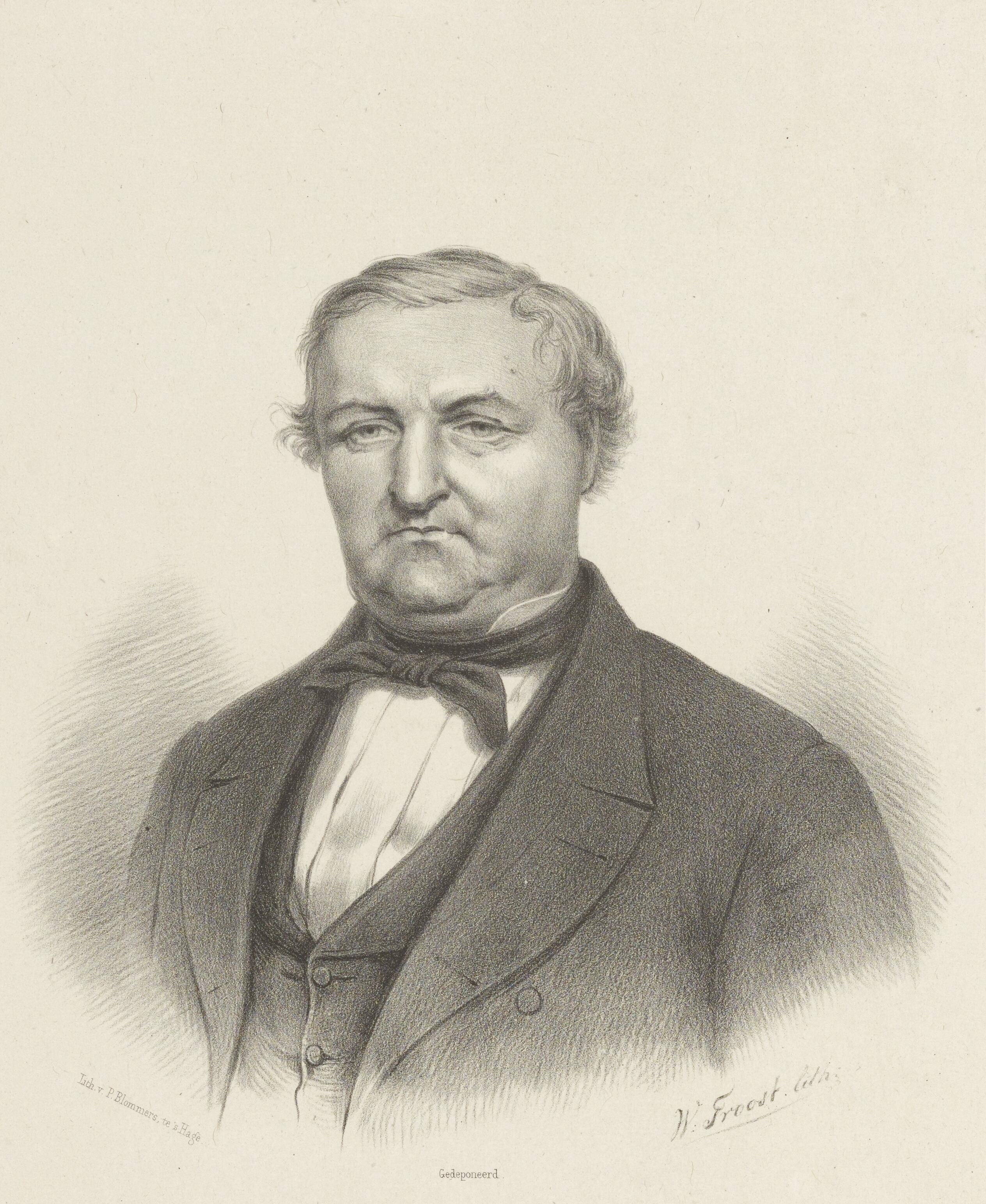
- Born: 8 October 1797; Grou, Netherlands
- Died: 22 March 1858 (aged 60); Grou, Netherlands
- Citizenship: Dutch
- Occupations: physician, poet, writer
- Spouse: Baukje Fockens (m. 1823)
- Children: 4 (2 sons and 2 daughters)
- Writing career
- Language: West Frisian
- Years active: 1822–1858
- Period: 19th century
- Genres: Poetry, short stories
- Notable works: Rimen en Teltsjes; De Alde Friezen
- Movement: Romanticism

Eeltsje Hiddes Halbertsma (West Frisian: [ˈeːltsjǝ ˈhɪdəs ˈhɔlbǝtsma]; Dutch: Eeltje Hiddes Halbertsma [ˈeːltɕǝ ˈɦɪdəs ˈɦɑlbǝrtsmaː]; 8 October 1797 – 22 March 1858) was a Frisian writer, poet and physician, member of the Halbertsma family, and the youngest of the Halbertsma Brothers. He became well known when he and his elder brother Justus published the poetry and short story collection De Lapekoer fan Gabe Skroar in 1822. Afterwards, this work was continually expanded, and also came to include contributions by a third brother, Tsjalling, until all the Halbertsma Brothers' prose and poetry was posthumously collected in 1871 to become the famous work Rimen en Teltsjes. This book played a role of crucial importance in the development of a new literary tradition after Western Frisian had been used almost exclusively as a spoken language for three centuries. Of the three Brothers Halbertsma, Eeltsje was probably the most talented, en his poetry especially is still very much admired. His oeuvre included the poem De Alde Friezen, which later became the national anthem of the Western Frisian people.

== Life ==
=== Youth and background ===
Eeltsje Hiddes Halbertsma was born on 8 October 1797, in his parents' house on Kowemerk ("Cow Market") street in the village of Grou, in the central part of the Dutch province of Friesland. He was the fourth son of the baker and small-time merchant Hidde Joasts Halbertsma (1756–1809) and his wife Ruerdtsje (or Riurtk) Tsjallings Binnerts (1767–1809). He had three elder brothers: Justus ("Joast") (1789–1869), Tsjalling (1792–1852), and Binnert (1795–1847). Two children who were born later died in early childhood, the little boy in 1803, and the little girl in 1805. The brothers were very close, possibly as a consequence of the fact that both their parents died at a relatively young age in 1809, when Eeltsje was only eleven years of age. Justus, Tsjalling and Eeltsje, who, as authors, became known as the Brothers Halbertsma later in life, were much like their father, while Binnert more resembled their mother.

This mother, Ruerdtsje Binnerts, was a scion of a prominent family in Grou. Her people were Mennonites, and although her husband had been raised a Calvinist, he converted after marrying her. From the letters of Eeltsje's brother Justus Ruerdtsje emerges as a smart businesswoman, a loving mother, and a deeply religious person. About Hidde Halbertsma, the father, much less is known. It is thought that he might have been a mariner before his marriage. He is described as a gentle soul, who was, however, apt to take offence, and could be quite sharp-tongued in such cases. In 1784, he published a long Dutch-language poem under the title Schrikkelijke IJsgang en Overstroominge in Gelderland ("Terrible Ice-drift and Flooding in Gelderland"). From this intriguing work it is clear that his sons' literary talents ran in the family.

=== Education ===
Like his elder brother Justus, Eeltsje Halbertsma was sent to the French school in the provincial capital of Leeuwarden for a year by his mother, and after that, he was enrolled in the Latin school, also in Leeuwarden. There, he started following lessons probably just before Ruerdtsje Binnerts' death in December 1809. As their father, Hidde Halbertsma, had died in January of that same year, the brothers became orphans because of this unfortunate event. Justus, the eldest brother, was studying in Amsterdam at the time. Eeltsje could continue his education in the Latin school because the middle brothers, Tsjalling and Binnert, kept their father's bakery running with the help of their father's baker's mates. As commuting from Grou to Leeuwarden and back again on a daily basis was out of the question with roads and transportation being what they were at that time, Eeltsje boarded in the city with one Hawerdink, an acquaintance of his brother Justus, who apparently introduced him to the most vulgar form of City Frisian, a Dutch (not Frisian) dialect which is spoken in the cities in Friesland.

When he had finished his training in the Latin school, towards the end of 1814, Eeltsje Halbertsma left for Holland, where he started a study of medicine at the University of Leiden which lasted until April 1818. In the student city of Leiden, however, he became caught up in the rough night life, and that was why, by way of reorientation, he left for Heidelberg, in Germany, for half a year in the spring of 1818. There he enjoyed himself tremendously at the Ruprecht-Karls-Universität, and later in his life he always looked back on his Heidelberg period with a sense of wistfulness. The lessons he followed in Heidelberg for the most part had to do with obstetrics. After the summer, he returned to Leiden, where he ended his study by obtaining his doctorate in medicine on 13 October 1818.

Afterwards, Halbertsma became physician in Purmerend, in northern Holland, where he lived for a year and a half, and also became involved with a local girl whom he referred to as "the Little Peacock" in his letters to his brother Justus. Eventually, though, he became ill, and was brought back to his family in Grou, probably towards the end of 1820. When he had recovered, he did not go back to Holland, but instead started a practice in the village where he was born. He would spend the rest of his life there, because, he wrote to his brother Justus, "Grou is always lovely to me." Because of his good education, but also because of his compassionate bedside manner, Halbertsma had a very spread-out practice, with patients not only in Grou, but also scattered around the countryside and in neighbouring villages. This required him to travel a lot, for which he often had to depend on boats in the marshy lake country of Central Friesland.

=== Nature and views ===
From stories of people who knew him, Eeltsje Hiddes Halbertsma emerges as a man who was quickly moved, but could also have a lot of fun. According to the bookseller and historian Wopke Eekhoff, who was acquainted with him for many years, Halbertsma was big-hearted and generous, and a droll story-teller. One of Halbertsma's biographers described him as "a fine-feeling spirit, an idealistic dreamer, an independent and courageous man, afflicted by periods of melancholy and doubt; a bohémien and a rascal, such as there has been no second of in all of Western Frisian literature." Halbertsma's letters to his brother Justus are lively and open-hearted, and also quite entertaining still. As for his views, Halbertsma had become influenced by Deism in his student days, but according to himself he had changed his opinion after reading the German philosopher Johann Gottfried Herder.

Halbertsma tried to stay away from politics. In the company of others he was sometimes seduced into speaking on that subject, but he was always afraid to say too much; his father had been a supporter of the Patriot movement, and Halbertsma could never forget how badly that had ended. For all that, he did not just stand by when his sense of justice was violated, as is shown by his poems De Grytman ("The Grietman"; about corruption in the political upper classes in Friesland) and Batthyany's Dea ("Batthyany's Death"; about the execution of Lajos Batthyány, the leader of the Hungarians in the Hungarian Rebellion of 1848–1849). He also wrote, in Dutch, a poem in which he rages against the fact that Frisian members of the Tweede Kamer voted against the proposal to abolish slavery in 1853. On the other hand, he was not so progressive that he felt himself in any way connected to those he called, in 1855, "red democrats" (that is to say socialists and other political radicals), whom he separated from "the decent-minded", with which he meant the progressive, liberal section of the settled middle class, to which he himself belonged.

In 1827, Halbertsma became a member of the Provinciaal Friesch Genootschap ter Beoefening van Friesche Geschied-, Oudheid- en Taalkunde ("Provincial Frisian Society for the Study of Frisian History, Antiquities and Linguistics"), but in 1834, he cancelled his membership because he felt this club was full to the rafters with silly people. He could not stomach the affected poshness of the middle class gentlemen, and neither could he reconcile such graveness of bearing with the 'gluttony and wine-guzzling' which followed the gatherings. "Es gibt Narren aller Art" ("It takes fools of all kinds"), he wrote to his brother Justus. Justus did remain a member of the society, but because he was a Mennonite minister in Deventer, in the province of Overijssel, and was therefore mostly a member by correspondence, it was somewhat easier for him to look at things with a certain detachment. Later, Eeltsje Halbertsma became a member of the Selskip foar Fryske Taal en Skriftekennisse ("Society for Knowledge of Frisian Language and Literature"), where he felt much more at home.

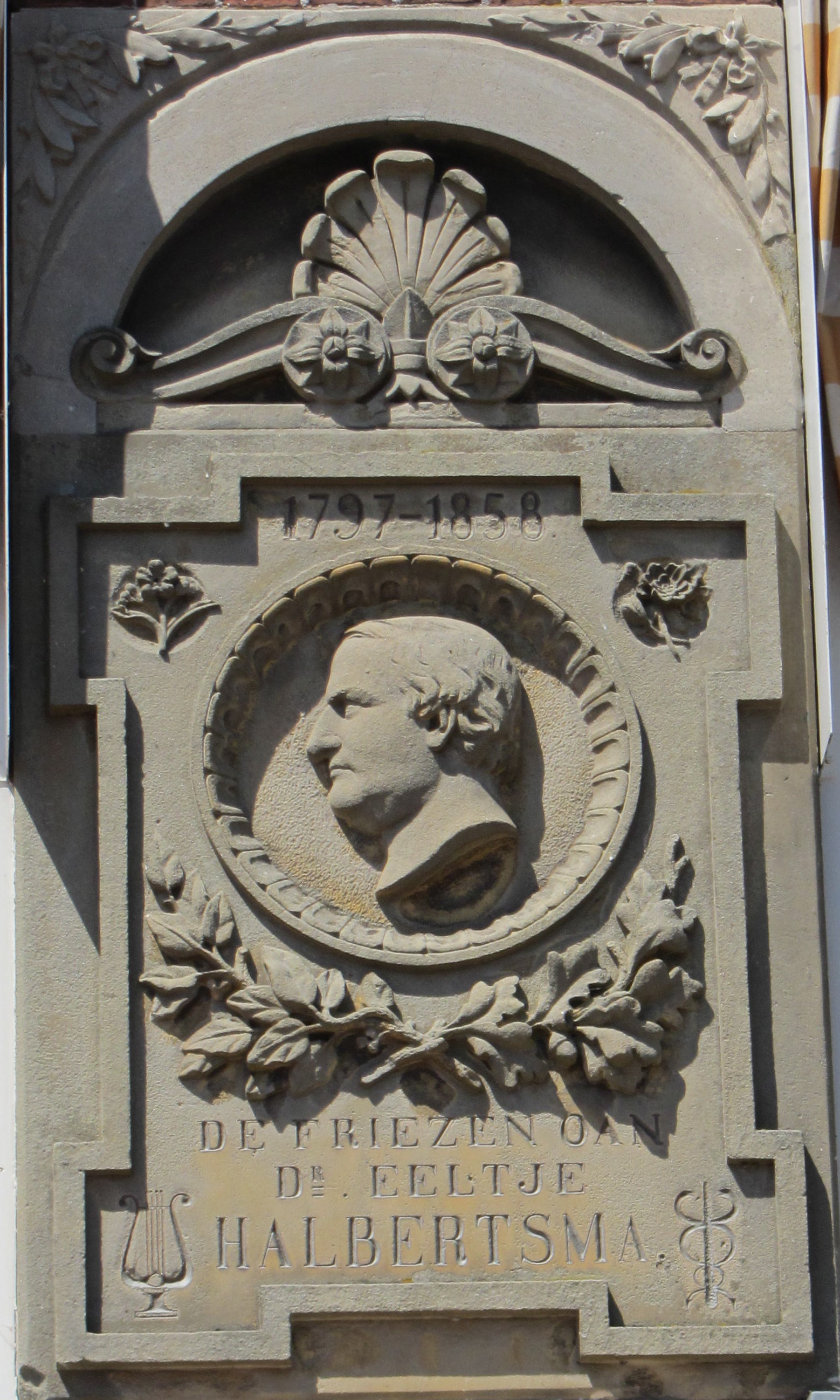
Gable stone with the likeness of Eeltsje Halbertsma in the front wall of the house of his birth in Grou, by Willem Molkenboer.

=== Family ===
In June 1823, Halbertsma married Baukje Fockens (1795–1877), a woman from a well-to-do family from Bolsward, whom he had met in the autumn of 1822. She was the daughter of Livius (Liuwe) Regnerus Fockens, a mayor of Bolsward who had died not long before. Halbertsma and his wife had four children: two sons and two daughters. Only their son Hidde would survive his father, as the other son, Liuwe, died in 1854, and both of the girls, Ruerdtsje and Anna, were laid to rest yn 1851. The death of Anna (1832–1851), with whom he was exceptionally close, hit Halbertsma especially hard; about this loss he wrote the touching poem Op Anna's Dea ("On Anna's Death"), which was published in 1854, in the poetry and short story collection Leed en Wille en de Flotgerzen ("Grief and Pleasure and Down Upon the Lee Shore").

Halbertsma's marriage was, after the first few years, not very happy, as he was much too fond of alcohol, while his wife nagged constantly, was distrustful and reproached him continuously for living off her money. It is therefore probably not coincidental that in several of Halbertsma's stories the main characters are a drunken man and his angry wife. In 1853, when both marriage partners had neglected their household for years, the parents were placed under guardianship by both of their sons, which was done especially on the initiative of Liuwe. Although Halbertsma managed to become his own master again in 1857, this was a humiliation for which it was not easy for him to forgive his son, and there is no elegy for Liuwe's passing in 1854, as Halbertsma did make for both of his daughters.

=== Writing career ===
Halbertsma felt the drive to write for the first time, as his brother Justus would later tell it, when he came back from his half-year in Heidelberg, and noticed that the street songs in the Netherlands were of a very low quality compared to those in Germany. According to Justus, Eeltsje Halbertsma set out writing poetry to replace the existing songs with better ones of his own making. The linguist Philippus H. Breuker, who added an extensive and penetrating afterword to the reprint of Rimen en Teltsjes of 1993, observed, however, that this assertion could "never be more than half the truth," as Halbertsma's early poetry was not of a high literary value; quite the opposite, in fact. According to Breuker, it seems more likely that Halbertsma wanted to emulate these Dutch street songs.

Later on, he must have come under the influence of Justus' ideas, who wanted to preserve the Western Frisian language by reintroducing it for writing after it had been used almost exclusively as a spoken language for three centuries. From that it followed that Justus had to get the Frisians to read in their own language (otherwise, writing it would not be of much use), and to achieve that aim, he set out writing the sort of folk literature which dovetailed nicely with Eeltsje Halbertsma's work. As Justus remained the editor of Eeltsje's work for his entire life, their poetry and short fiction were strongly connected and published together from the very beginning. Although writing short stories and poems was something which Eeltsje Halbertsma could not do without, from approximately 1830 onwards the social prestige he won with it also started to play a role.

In 1822, the best of the early works of Eeltsje and Justus were collected under the title De Lapekoer fan Gabe Skroar ("Gabe Tailor's Rag Basket"; original, archaic spelling: De Lape Koer fen Gabe Skroor), a booklet consisting of 36 pages, and including six poems and one short story. This publication was attributed to the fictional 'Gabe Skroar', a lame farmer's son who became a tailor and a writer, but died young. This character was in all probability a creation of Eeltsje's. Hiding behind such a fictional author was fairly normal at that time. A second, expanded edition of De Lapekoer fan Gabe Skroar, consisting of 237 pages, was published in 1829, followed by a third, further expanded edition in 1834, running to almost 500 pages of a larger size. After that, additions were published separately in 1836 (De Noarger Rún oan Gabe Skroar), 1840 (Twigen út in Alde Stamme), 1854 (Leed en Wille en de Flotgerzen), and 1858 (De Jonkerboer and Teltsjes fan de Wize Mannen fan Esonstêd).

Eeltsje Halbertsma was almost certainly the most talented of the three writing Halbertsma Brothers. While Tsjalling's works were intended purely for entertainment, and Justus composed his stories and poetry in a somewhat distant, cerebral way, which keeps the reader a little detached from what is read, Eeltsje put his heart and soul into his poems and stories. It is this emotion which brings his work closer to the reader. Furthermore, Eeltsje's prose and poetry are in proportion to each other, qualitatively, while in Justus' works the poetry is generally quite clearly not of the same high standing as his prose. In the middle of the 20th century the author and literary critic Anne Wadman stated that Eeltsje was the greatest poet of his time in the Netherlands; as neither Willem Bilderdijk nor Isaäc da Costa were fit to hold a candle to him (he wrote), one would look invain for someone of the same stature in the Dutch literature of that period.

On the basis of Romanticism, which he had acquired in Heidelberg, Eeltsje Halbertsma often needed a first impulse for his works, an existing text or melody that he could, as he himself put it, "frisify in such a way that no one could recognise the original anymore." Because of this it is thought that the masterful Jonker Pyt en Sibbel ("Squire Pete and Sibylle") could possibly be a much improved version of the Dutch-language poem Steedsche Jonker en een Friessche Boerin ("City Squire and a Frisian Farmer's Wife"), from the 18th century. It is beyond dispute that Halbertsma based some of his poetry on earlier works by such poets as Johann Peter Hebel and Ludwig Hölty. For instance, De Boalserter Merke ("The Bolsward Fair"), still one of his most well-known works, is a Nachdichtung of Hebel's lovesong Hans und Verene, in which the main characters were renamed Hoatse and Wobbel, the background was shifted from a German well to a fair in the Frisian city of Bolsward, and quite a few smaller changes were made. An example of a poem based on Hölty's work is the somewhat morbid Deagraverssankje ("Grave-digger's Song").

Though Halbertsma often wrote idyllic poems in his early years, such as It Marke ("The Little Lake") and Geale' Sliepke ("Geale's Nap"), and, to a lesser degree, It Famke ("The Girl"), later the circumstances of his family life and professional difficulties so depressed him that he wrote, "you [will] find in my last works nothing of that Arcadia." In its place came moving elegies, such as De Likeblommen ("The Leek Flowers"), Op Anna's Dea ("On Anna's Death"), and It Tsjerkhôf by Jûntiid ("The Churchyard in the Evening"), and also poems such as It Libbensein ("Life's End"), and Deagraverssankje ("Grave-digger's Song"), which reflect upon the transitory nature of human existence. Halbertsma was, however, also the author of the mildly humorous Ald Jan-om ("Old Uncle John"), in which a farm-hand of advanced years complains of the farmer's daughter's constant stream of suitors, who are always getting in his way, and of the love poem Skipperssankje ("Skipper's Song"), a mariner's entreaty to his beloved not to forget him, even if his ship should sink and he should drown. The appreciation for Halbertsma's strongly rhetorical freedom hymns has eroded in the course of the 20th century, but even so, the nationalistic song De Alde Friezen, ("The Frisians of Old") is still the national anthem of the Western Frisian people, which it was proclaimed to be yn 1875 (in a thoroughly revised version by Jacobus van Loon).

In his prose Halbertsma shows himself to be a smooth story-teller, occasionally using a poetic-realistic approach, such as in the story Utfanhûs by de Boer ("Staying the Night on the Farm"), at other times becoming ironic, such as in De Klúnskonk fan Us Ald Dominy ("Our Old Minister's Skate-walking Leg"). De Noarger Rún oan Gabe Skroar ("The Norg Gelding to Gabe Tailor"), which has the form of a letter from the afterlife to Gabe Tailor, written by his dead horse, is a satire, while in De Reis nei de Jichtmasters ("The Journey to the Gout Masters") Halbertsma uses mild humour and a little mockery to poke fun at his own medical profession. In the longer story De Jonkerboer ("The Gentleman Farmer"), which some critics call a novella, the main motif is a longing for a peaceful and diligent existence in the country-side. That same feeling is also embodied by De Quickborn ("The Quickborn"), a choice of poems Halbertsma translated very freely from the poetry collection of the same name which was originally written in the Low German dialect of the northern German region of Dithmarschen by Klaus Groth.

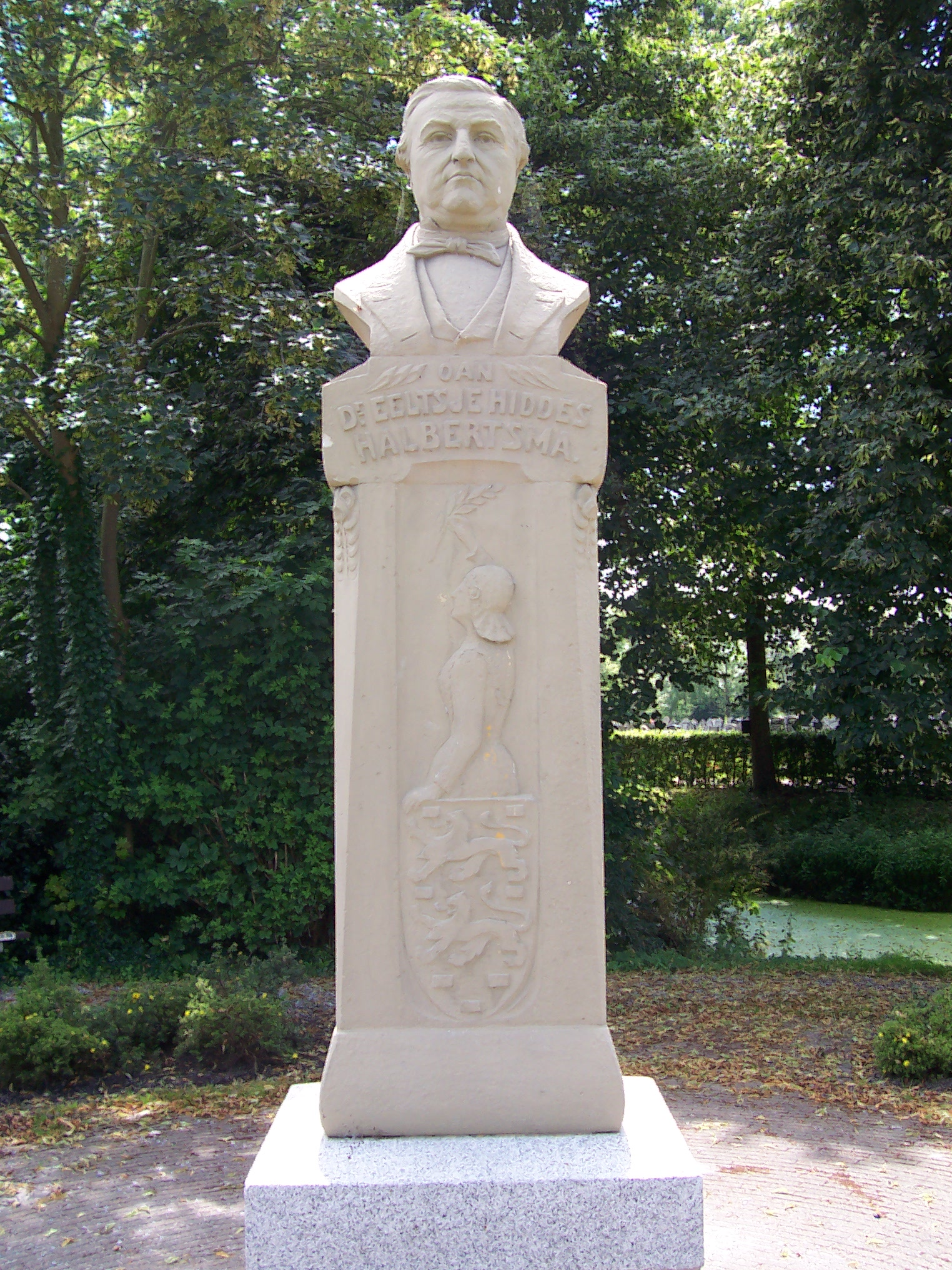
The statue of Eeltsje Hiddes Halbertsma in Grou.

Striking things about Eeltsje Halbertsma's literary works are the wonderful sound patterns in some of his poems, especially Geale' Sliepke ("Geale's Nap"), and his playful additions of phrases in other languages or dialects, which occur mostly in his stories, but also in some poems, like Jonker Pyt and Sibbel ("Squire Pete and Sibylle"), where the squire has just returned from fashionable France, and now believes it shows his breeding and social status to throw around French words and phrases. "Gibberish, odd names, strange types of people, stopgap words, [...] the most surprising metaphors, and the most unexpected jumps in a train of thought," all of these occur regularly in Halbertsma's prose. In his works he was guided by the ideal image he had in his mind of the Western Frisians as simple but genuine people, which he contrasted against the Dutch, who were in his eyes refined but insincere.

=== Death ===
In his last years there was not much which connected Halbertsma to the village of Grou. Because of his unhappy marriage, he could not find solace at home, and the death of his daughter Anna, in 1851, had made him lose his cheerfulness. The following year his brother Tsjalling also died, who had been the steadfast centre of the family. That is why Eeltsje, after he had transferred his medical practice to his son Hidde in 1856, started a wandering life visiting family members who lived far away. Later on, he lived for a little while by himself in Leeuwarden, but a few weeks before his death he arranged to be brought back to Grou. He died there on 22 March 1858, when he was sixty years of age. He was buried in a double-deep grave which later came to lie outside of the churchyard boundaries, and is now marked by three red stones in an otherwise yellow-paved pathway.

== Legacy ==
After the death of all three Brothers Halbertsma, their short fiction and poetry was gathered under the supervision of librarian and archivist Gerben Colmjon and bookseller and historian Wopke Eekhoff. In 1871, it was published by the firm of J. de Lange in Deventer, under the title of Rimen en Teltsjes ("Rhymes and Tales"). This work is now thought of as the national book of Western Frisian literature, and although the literary value of this collection was later disputed by some critics, it is undeniable that Rimen en Teltsjes and its predecessor De Lapekoer fan Gabe Skroar played a role of crucial importance in the development of a new literary tradition after Western Frisian had been used almost exclusively as a spoken language for three centuries.

In 1949, the author and literary critic Anne Wadman wrote that the Halbertsmas gave "the Western Frisian people a literary monument, in which they saw their own life as a nation [...] reflected." As of today Rimen en Teltsjes still occupies the first slot in the ranking of Western Frisian literary classics. In 1993, the tenth reprint of the book was published, including for the first time some (earlier, lower-quality) work of Eeltsje Halbertsma which had until then remained outside of Rimen en Teltsjes. This reprint had a (for Western Frisian literature) ambitious printing of 3,000 copies, but was sold out within two months.

The Selskip foar Fryske Taal en Skriftekennisse hired the sculptor Willem Molkenboer in 1875, to make a stone tablet in which the likeness of Eeltsje Hiddes Halbertsma was chiselled out. This was placed as a gable stone in the front wall of the house where the Halbertsma Brothers were born, on what later was renamed Halbertsmaplein ("Halbertsma Square"). In 1879, another stone tablet by the same artist was added to the left with the likeness of Justus Hiddes Halbertsma. Furthermore, in 1903 the Selskip ordered a statue of Eeltsje Halbertsma to be made and placed on Parkstrjitte ("Park Street") in Grou, consisting of a bust on a more than man-high limestone column resting on a pedestal of granite, made by Johan Schröder. The inscription reads: "TO D^{R} EELTSJE HIDDES HALBERTSMA", with on the back of the column: "Ljeaf bliuwe ús Fryske tael en liet." ("Beloved to us remain the Western Frisian language and its songs.")

== Bibliography ==
- 1821 – Soe Ik Net in Wurdsje Sizze ("Would I Not Say a Few Words"; poem)
- 1822 – Hjir Is in Krintebôle ("Take This Currant Bread"; rhyme)
- 1822 – De Lapekoer fan Gabe Skroar ("Gabe Tailor's Rag Basket"; collection of poetry and short stories, with Justus Hiddes Halbertsma)
- 1823 – Nijjierswinsk oan in Ald Boargemaster ("New Year's Wish to a Former Mayor"; poem)
- 1823 – Us Gysbertomme ("Our Uncle Gysbert"; poem about Gysbert Japiks)
- 1829 – De Lapekoer fan Gabe Skroar (collection of poetry and short stories, with Justus Hiddes Halbertsma; expanded version)
- 1830 – Yn de Dollejoarum Rinne ("Walking Deep in Thought"; short story)
- 1831 – Foeke Skutter en Hospes' Tryn ("Citizen Soldier Foeke and Tryn the Innkeeper's Wife"; short story with a poem)
- 1833 – Fêsteljûnpraatsje ("Shrove Tuesday's Talk"; dialogue)
- 1833 – Ybel en Jelke, of: De Boask op it Iis (Ybel and Jelke, or: The Marriage on the Ice"; poem)
- 1834 – De Lapekoer fan Gabe Skroar (collection of poetry and short stories, with Justus Hiddes Halbertsma; further expanded version)
- 1835 – De Skearwinkel fan Joutebaas ("Boss Joute's Barbershop"; frame-story with several poems and short stories, with Justus Hiddes Halbertsma en Tsjalling Hiddes Halbertsma)
- 1836 – De Noarger Rún oan Gabe Skroar ("The Norg Gelding to Gabe Tailor"; short story with a poem)
- 1836 – De Treemter fan it Sint-Anthonygasthûs ("The Conversation Room of St. Anthony's Hospital"; short story)
- 1837 – Eölus, Grewa fan Stoarm en Onwaar ("Aeolus, Lord of Storm and Thunder"; poetry and short story collection, with Justus Hiddes Halbertsma)
- 1837 – Op it Doktor-wurden fan Myn Miich K.T. Halbertsma ("To the Doctorate of My Relative K. T. Halbertsma"; poem)
- 1839–1841 – Grouster Weachbryfkes ("Notes from the Weigh-house in Grou"; speeches with poems; with Tsjalling Hiddes Halbertsma)
- 1840 – Twigen út in Alde Stamme ("Twigs from an Old Trunk"; poetry and short story collection, with Justus Hiddes Halbertsma)
- 1841 – De Foarname Utfanhûzers yn Fryslân ("The Distinguished Guests in Friesland"; short story with a poem)
- 1841 – Nijjierswinsk foar 1841 ("New Year's Wish for 1841"; poem)
- 1841 – Oan Petrus, Doe't er Doktor Waard ("To Petrus, When He Took His Doctor's Degree"; poems)
- 1841 – Grouster Rattelwachts Nijjierswinsk foar it Jier 1842 ("New Year's Wish for the Year 1842 from the Night Watchmen of Grou"; poem)
- 1842 – As de Wite Flokken Fleane ("When the White Flakes Fly"; poem)
- 1842 – In Wurdmannich fan de Weachmasters ("A Couple of Words from the Weigh-house Masters"; speech)
- 1843 – De Grouster Weachmasters oan de Merkegasten ("The Weigh-house Masters of Grou to the Visitors of the Fair"; speech)
- 1844 – Gysbert Japix' Grutte Namme ("Gysbert Japix' Great Name"; poem)
- 1846 – Wettersang ("Water Song"; poem)
- 1847 – De Grytman ("The Grietman"; poem)
- 1848 – 'k Haw Him as Jong'ling Kend ("I Knew Him as a Young Man"; poem)
- 1849 – Batthyany's Dea ("Batthyany's Death"; poem)
- 1851 – Minne Jorrits Reis nei it Kollumer Oproer (Minne Jorrits' Journey to the Rising of Kollum"; historical short story based on the Rising of Kollum in 1797)
- 1851 – Riurtk or Sy, Dy't de Dierb're Namme Droech ("Riurtk" or "She, Who Bore That Cherished Name"; poem)
- 1853 – Oer Swarte Minsken ("On Black People"; short story)
- 1854 – Leed en Wille en de Flotgerzen ("Grief and Pleasure and Down Upon the Lee Shore"; poetry and short story collection, with Justus Hiddes Halbertsma)
- 1855 – Blomke op it Grêf fan Petrus ("A Small Flower on Petrus' Grave"; poem)
- 1855 – Joukebier Is Swiet Bier ("Jouke's Beer Is Sweet Beer"; short story)
- 1855 – Jurjen mei de Leppel ("Jurjen with the Spoon"; poem)
- 1855 – It Oardeel fan Minsken oer Minsken ("People's Judgment on People"; short story)
- 1855 – Samenspraak oer de Russen en de Turken ("Dialogue on the Russians and the Turks"; short story)
- 1857 – De Quickborn ("The Quickborn"; poetry collection)
- 1858 – De Jonkerboer ("The Gentleman Farmer"; short story)
- 1858 – Teltsjes fan de Wize Mannen fan Esonstêd ("The Wise Men of Esonstad"; collection of tales)
- 18?? – De Blom fan Fryslâns Hearen ("The Flower of Friesland's Lordships"; poem)
- 18?? – Dominy Hollema en Reid Jeltes ("Minister Hollema and Reid Jeltes"; poem)
- 18?? – De Faam en de Bargekop ("The Maid and the Pig's Head"; short story)
- 18?? – It Famke út de Frjemdte ("De Girl from Far Away"; poem)
- 18?? – Fammen Hâlde fan it Trouwen ("Girls Want to Marry"; poem)
- 18?? – Foar de Toanbank en Derefter ("In Front of the Counter and Behind It"; short story)
- 18?? – Grouster Freonen! ("Friends from Grou!"; poem)
- 18?? – Hollân en Fryslân ("Holland and Friesland"; poem)
- 18?? – De Tsjustersinnige Minske ("Dark-minded Mankind"; poem)
- 1871 – Rimen en Teltsjes ("Rhymes and Tales"; poetry and short story collection, with Justus Hiddes Halbertsma en Tsjalling Hiddes Halbertsma)

== Sources ==
- Boelens, Krine, et al., Twataligens: Ynlieding yn Underskate Aspekten fan de Twataligens, Leeuwarden (Afûk), 1981, ISBN 9 06 27 30 086.
- Breuker, Philippus H., Oer Skriuwers, Boek en Utjeften, in: Halbertsma, Brothers, Rimen en Teltsjes, Drachten (A.J. Osinga Utjouwerij), 1993, ISBN 9 06 06 64 892, pp. 587–613.
- Breuker, Philippus H., Halbertsma, Eeltsje, in: Schroor, Meindert, ed., Nieuwe Encyclopedie van Fryslân, Gorredijk/Leeuwarden (Utjouwerij Bornmeer/Tresoar), 2016, ISBN 978-9 05 61 53 755, pp. 1123–1124.
- De Vries, S., Monumentenwijzer: Wegwijs in de Doolhof van Monumenten, Zutphen (Walburg), 1983, ISBN 9 06 01 11 796.
- Dykstra, Klaes, and Bouke Oldenhof, Lyts Hânboek fan de Fryske Literatuer, Leeuwarden (Afûk), 1997, ISBN 9 07 00 10 526, pp. 37–42.
- ――, Fryslân Sjongt, Leeuwarden (Afûk), 2000, ISBN 9 06 27 33 611.
- Halbertsma, Brothers, Rimen en Teltsjes, Bolsward/Leeuwarden (A.J. Osinga Utjouwerij/R. van der Velde), 1958, no ISBN.
- Halbertsma, Brothers, Rimen en Teltsjes, Drachten (A.J. Osinga Utjouwerij), 1993, ISBN 9 06 06 64 892.
- Hemminga, Piet, Fryslân: Fêstens en Feroaring, in: Hiemstra, Sytze T., De Fryslannen, Leeuwarden (Frisian Council/Afûk), 2008, ISBN 978-9 06 27 37 734.
- Jensma, Goffe, Cultuur in Friesland en Friese Cultuur, 1795–1917, in: Frieswijk, Johan, et al., red., Geschiedenis van Friesland 1750–1995, Amsterdam/Leeuwarden (Uitgeverij Boom/Fryske Akademy), 1998, ISBN 9 05 35 23 685, pp. 172–212.
- Koopmans, Ype, Muurvast & Gebeiteld: Beeldhouwkunst in de Bouw 1840–1940, Rotterdam (NAi Uitgevers), 1997, ISBN 978-9 07 24 69 670.
- Oppewal, Teake, and Pier Boorsma, Spiegel van de Friese Poëzie: Van de Zeventiende Eeuw tot Heden, Amsterdam (J.M. Meulenhoff B.V.), 1994, ISBN 9 02 90 47 569.
- Schroor, Meindert, ed., Nieuwe Encyclopedie van Fryslân, Gorredijk/Leeuwarden (Utjouwerij Bornmeer/Tresoar), 2016, ISBN 978-9 05 61 53 755.
- Terpstra, Pieter, Tweeduizend Jaar Geschiedenis van Friesland, Leeuwarden (Uitgeverij M.Th. van Seyen), no year, no ISBN, pp. 312–323.
- Twerda, Hendrik, Fan Fryslâns Forline, Bolsward (A.J. Osinga N.V.), 1968, no ISBN, pp. 296–299.
- Van der Schaaf, Sjoerd, Skiednis fan de Fryske Biweging, Leeuwarden (De Tille), 1977, no ISBN.
- Wadman, Anne, Frieslands Dichters, Leiden (L. Stafleu), 1949, no ISBN.
- Wiersma, J.P., Foarwurd and De Bruorren Halbertsma, in: Halbertsma, Brothers, Rimen en Teltsjes, Bolsward (A.J. Osinga N.V.), 1958, pp. 5–14.
