= Geart Aeilco Wumkes =

West Frisian language Bible translator, historian and preacher

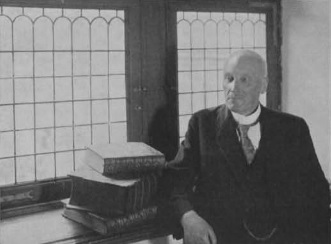
Wumkes

Geart Aeilco Wumkes or G.A. Wumkies (4 September 1869, Joure – 7 May 1954, Huizum) was a Protestant West Frisian language Bible translator, historian, and preacher of the Dutch Reformed Church.

== Major work ==
His major work was the translation of the Bible into West Frisian, with the New Testament (West Frisian: Nije Testamint) being published in 1933 and the Old Testament (West Frisian: Alde Testamint) in 1943. The Old Testament was completed with the help of E. B. Folkertsma. The complete Bible (West Frisian: Bibel) was published in 1943.

== Other translations ==
In 1953 he translated John Bunyan's The Pilgrim's Progress into West Frisian: De Pylgerreize.
