= De Alde Friezen =

Anthem of Friesland, the Netherlands

De Âlde Friezen
English: The Old Frisians
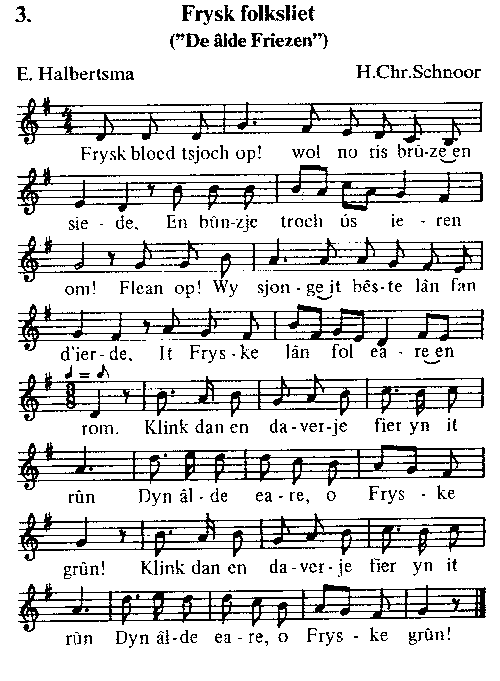
- Regional anthem of Friesland
- Lyrics: Eeltsje Halbertsma / Jacobus van Loon, 1876
- Music: Heinrich Christian Schnoor

Audio sample
- The anthem of Friesland, vocal version.: file; help

"De Âlde Friezen" (English: "The Old Frisians") is the anthem of the Friesland province of the Netherlands.

The text is by the Frisian writer Eeltsje Halbertsma. The version commonly sung today is an abridgement, dating from 1876, by Jacobus van Loon. The words were not set to music until after Halbertsma's death; they were first sung in 1875 at a ceremony held to commemorate his work. The song was adopted as the Frisian anthem by the Selskip foar Frysk Taal- en Skriftekennisse (Society for Frisian Language and Literature) and has served as the anthem of Friesland ever since.

== Lyrics ==
Frysk bloed tsjoch op! Wol no ris brûze en siede,
en bûnzje troch ús ieren om!
Flean op! Wy sjonge it bêste lân fan d'ierde,
it Fryske lân fol eare en rom.

Refrein:
Klink dan en daverje fier yn it rûn,
Dyn âlde eare, o Fryske grûn! (2x)

Hoe ek fan oermacht, need en see betrutsen,
oerâlde, leave Fryske grûn,
Nea waard dy fêste, taaie bân ferbrutsen,
dy't Friezen oan har lân ferbûn.

(Refrein)

Fan bûgjen frjemd, bleau by 't âld folk yn eare,
syn namme en taal, syn frije sin;
Syn wurd wie wet; rjocht, sljocht en trou syn leare,
en twang, fan wa ek, stie it tsjin.

(Refrein)

Trochloftich folk fan dizze âlde namme,
wês jimmer op dy âlders great!
Bliuw ivich fan dy grize, hege stamme,
in grien, in krêftich bloeiend leat!

(Refrein)

Translation:

Frisian blood, brew! Foam and boil,
and beat through our veins!
Rise! We sing of the best land on the Earth,
the Frisian land, full of honour and glory.

Chorus:
It resounds and thunders far and wide,
Thine ancient honour, oh Frisian soil! (2x)

Despite threats from great powers, hardships, and the sea,
ancient and beloved Frisian soil,
Never were the steadfast bonds broken,
that bound the Frisians to their land.

(Chorus)

Bowing to no one, the old Frisians retained their honour,
their name and language, their sense of freedom.
Their word was law; fair, modest, and true was its doctrine,
and opposed to coercion, from whomever it might come.

(Chorus)

Honourable people of this ancient name,
be always proud of your forefathers!
Remain forever, on that tall, grey trunk
a green and strong, flowering branch!

(Chorus)
