= Canon of Friesland =

The Canon of Friesland or Canon of Frisian History (West Frisian: Kanon fan de Fryske Skiednis) is a list of 41 topics (11 and 30, in reference to the Dutch ordinal elfendertig) offering a chronological summary of significant events and individuals in Frisian history.

Following the example of the Canon of Groningen, the Canon of Friesland is a provincial supplement to the Canon of the Netherlands. The canon was composed by an independent commission led by Goffe Jensma and presented in print on 11 November 2008 to Jannewietske de Vries, deputy of the provincial-executive of Friesland. The website 11en30.nu was launched thereafter, produced by Tresoar and Omrop Fryslân. In the years since, the Canon of Frisian history has become a common tool for educators.

Note that the life and work of Eise Eisinga is the only topic included in both Frisian and Dutch histories.

	Topic	Description	Period	Image
1	The Cow	The arrival of farmers and cattle	c. 3400 BCE	
2	The Hludana stone	In contact with the Romans	12 BCE to 400	
3	Hegebeintum	Friesland in the time of terps	c. 600 BCE to 1000 CE	
4	Sailors and merchants	The heyday of trade	450–1200	
5	Redbad and Boniface	A heathen king and a Christian martyr	689–754	
6	Friesland as land of monasteries	The glory of the monasteries	1100–1580	
7	The Frisian freedom	Rather dead than slave!	1250–1498	
8	The Old Frisian law	From Lex Frisionum to Alde Druk	800–1504	
9	Edzard Sirksena	Builder of a Frisian state	1462–1528	
10	Grutte Pier	Freedom hero or barbarian?	c. 1480–1520	
11	The Ayttas	Frisians in royal service	1499–1577	
12	Minne Simens	The Radical Reformation in Friesland	1496–1561	
13	Water	Fresh and saline, friend and foe	600 BCE to now	
14	The calculating farmer	The ledger of Rienck Hemmema	1569–1573	
15	The University in Franeker	Little powerhouse of learning	1585–1843	
16	Gysbert Japiks	Ordinary and straightforward	1603–1666	
17	Anna Maria fan Schurman	Learned and faithful	1607–1678	
18	Sikke fan Goslinga	Nobleman, regent, diplomat	1661–1731	
19	Maria Louise fan Hessen-Kassel	The Nassaus in Friesland	1688–1765	
20	Eise Eisinga	Living in a planetarium	1744–1828	
21	From republic to unitary state	Erstwhile free Frisians	1780–1813	
22	Justus Hiddes Halbertsma	'Mister Fryslân'	1789–1869	
23	The Oera Linda Book	The mystified Friesland	1867	
24	Domela and Piter Jelles	Poverty and charisma	1880–1900	
25	To the 'land of dream and wishing'	Emigration to the United States	1845–1914	
26	Margaretha Geertruida Zelle	Mata Hari	1876–1917	
27	The golden earizer	Material culture and Frisian identity	1840–1900	
28	Butter	The Frisian AEX index	0-now	
29	Douwe Kalma	Friesland and the world	1896–1953	
30	The Ofslútdyk	Friesland connected to Holland	1932	
31	Titus Brandsma	A Roman Frisian	1881–1942	
32	The milk strike	Striking had never been this dangerous	1943	
33	Abe Lenstra	A Frisian sports hero	1920–1985	
34	Kneppelfreed	Language conflict with baton and water cannon	1951	
35	The Alvestêdetocht	Carnival on the ice	1909–1997	
36	Hendrik Algra	The emancipation of the kleine luyden	1920–1950	
37	Tourism on the Waad	Uitwaaien on an island	1800-now	
38	The land consolidation	The influence of a Frisian model village	Second half of the 20th century	
39	Industrialization	Center of gravity shifted to the Wâlden	1949	
40	Gerrit Benner	A Leeuwarder painter and his Frisian landscape	1897–1981	
41	The Frisian language	The story of a language	c. 600 BCE-now	

== See also ==
- Canon of the Netherlands
- Canon of Amsterdam
- Canon of Gelderland
- Canon of Groningen
- Canon of Limburg
- Canon of Zeeland
- Canon of South Holland
- Canon of Curaçao
