= Canon of the Netherlands =

Committee recommendation for education on Dutch history

The Canon of the Netherlands (Dutch: Canon van Nederland; also known as the Canon of Dutch History) is a list of fifty topics that aims to provide a chronological summary of Dutch history to be taught in primary schools and the first two years of secondary school in the Netherlands.

== Canon ==
The Canon of Dutch History was prepared by a committee headed by Frits van Oostrom and presented to the Minister of Education, Culture and Science, Maria van der Hoeven, on 16 October 2006.

A revised version was presented to the Dutch government on 3 October 2007 and in October 2008 it was agreed to include the canon in the school curriculum by 1 August 2009. An updated version was presented in June 2020, with ten topics replaced, parts rewritten and other modifications made to make the canon more diverse and accessible.

The canon was designed to provide an overview of "what everyone ought to know, at the very least, about the history and culture of the Netherlands", as well as providing a framework for the teaching of History in Dutch schools. Schools are not obliged to teach the canon, in accordance with the Freedom of education principle incorporated in the Dutch constitution (article 23) that guarantees the right of parents to have their children educated in accordance with their religious and other views.

The website canonvannederland.nu is responsible for developing the canon for use in schools and in society in general.

== The 50 topics ==
	Topic	Date	Description
1	Trijntje	5750 BCE - 5250 BCE	The hunter-gatherers
2	Megalithic tombs	c. 3000 BCE	The first farmers
3	The Roman Limes	47 CE - c. 400 CE	On the frontiers of the Roman world
4	Willibrord	658 CE - 739 CE	The spread of Christianity
5	Charlemagne	742 CE - 814 CE	Emperor of the West
6	Hebban olla vogala	c. 1100	The Dutch language under development
7	The Hanseatic League	1356 - c. 1450	Collaboration pays off
8	Hieronymus Bosch	1450 - 1516	Painter in a medieval town
9	Mary of Burgundy	1457 - 1482	Sovereign between Burgundy and Habsburg
10	Erasmus	1469? - 1536	A critical mind in Europe
11	The Revolt	1566	From the Iconoclastic Fury to the Act of Abjuration
12	William of Orange	1533 - 1584	From rebel to "Father of the Fatherland"
13	Johan van Oldenbarnevelt	1547 - 1619	Chasms within the Republic
14	The trading Companies VOC & WIC	1602 - 1799	Sailing and fighting for trade
15	The Beemster Polder	1612	Dry feet in the polder
16	Hugo Grotius	1583 - 1645	Pioneer of modern international law
17	The States Bible	1637	The power of the Word
18	Rembrandt	1606? - 1669	A country full of painters
19	Blaeu's Atlas Maior	1662	Mapping the world
20	Michiel de Ruyter	1607 - 1676	The Republic in choppy seas
21	Christiaan Huygens	1629 - 1695	The beginnings of modern science
22	Spinoza	1632 - 1677	In search of truth
23	Slavery	c. 1637 - 1863	Human trafficking and forced labour
24	Eise Eisinga	1744 - 1828	The solar system in a living room
25	Sarah Burgerhart	1780 - 1785	Rebellious women in the Age of Reason
26	The patriots	1780 - 1795	Democratising the Republic
27	Napoleon Bonaparte	1769 - 1821	The French period in the Netherlands
28	King William I	1772 - 1843	The Kingdom of the Netherlands and Belgium
29	The first railway	1839	Acceleration
30	The Constitution	1848	The most important law of the Netherlands
31	Max Havelaar	1860	Injustice in the Dutch East Indies
32	The child protection act of Van Houten	19th century	Out of the factory and into the school
33	Vincent van Gogh	1853 - 1890	Painter in a new age
34	Aletta Jacobs	1854 - 1929	Standing up for equal rights
35	World War I	1914 - 1918	Wartime neutrality
36	Anton de Kom	1898 - 1945	Fighting racism and colonialism
37	World War II	1940 - 1945	The Netherlands occupied and liberated
38	Anne Frank	1929 - 1945	The persecution of the Jews
39	Indonesia	1945 - 1949	The struggle for independence
40	The great flood	1 February 1953	The danger of water
41	Television	since 1948	The world on your screen
42	The port of Rotterdam	since c. 1880	Gateway to the world
43	Marga Klompé	1912 - 1986	The welfare state
44	The immigrant workers	1960 - 2025	New Dutch residents
45	Annie M.G. Schmidt	1911 - 1995	Going against the grain in a bourgeois country
46	Coal and gas	1974 - 2023	The energy issue
47	The Caribbean	since 1945	Far away yet connected
48	Srebrenica	1995	Responsible for peace
49	Europe	since 1945	Joining forces for a peaceful Europe
50	That Orange Feeling	1974 - 2020	Sport connects

== Members of the Committee ==
- Frits van Oostrom (professor of Humanities at the University of Utrecht, President of the Royal Netherlands Academy of Arts and Sciences, Spinoza Prize 1995, AKO Literatuurprijs 1996), chairperson
- Paul van Meenen (leader of the Democrats 66 (D66) party in Leiden, vice chairperson of entoen.nu), vice chairperson
- Herman Beliën (senior lecturer in the Faculty of Humanities at the University of Amsterdam)
- Marjolijn Drenth (philosopher, novelist, columnist for de Volkskrant)
- Frans Groot (history teacher at the Amsterdam University of Applied Science)
- Els Kloek (history teacher and senior researcher in the Faculty of Arts at the University of Utrecht, project leader of the Online Women's Dictionary of the Netherlands)
- Susan Legêne (professor of political history at the Vrije Universiteit of Amsterdam, formerly curator of the Tropenmuseum in Amsterdam)
- Rob van der Vaart (Professor in Human Geography at the University of Utrecht)
- Hubert Slings (director of entoen.nu, director of education at the Dutch National Museum of History), secretary

== See also ==
- Canon of Dutch Literature
- Canon of Amsterdam
- Canon of Friesland
- Canon of Gelderland
- Canon of Groningen
- Canon of Limburg
- Canon of Zeeland
- Canon of South Holland
- Canon of Curaçao
