= Oene Noordenbos =

Dutch humanist and politician (1896-1978)

- Oene Noordenbos (second from left) in 1962

Member of the House of Representatives
- In office 7 June 1962 – 5 June 1963

Member of the Provincial Council of South Holland
- In office 1 July 1958 – April 1968

Personal details
- Born: 5 July 1896 Bozum, Netherlands
- Died: 24 June 1978 (aged 81) Amersfoort, Netherlands
- Party: PSP (from 1957)
- Spouse: Geertruida Johanna de Klerk (m. 1922)
- Children: 4
- Education: Leiden University

Oene Noordenbos (5 July 1896 – 24 June 1978) was a Dutch humanist, historian, and politician. He was a prominent figure in the Dutch humanist movement, who published widely on various subjects. He also participated in the founding of the Pacifist Socialist Party (PSP), and served as a member of the Dutch House of Representatives for the PSP from 1962 to 1963.

== Early life ==
Oene Noordenbos was born on 5 July 1896 in Bozum, a small village in Friesland, to Klaas Noordenbos, a teacher, and Sjitske Wagenaar. After attending secondary education in Leeuwarden, he began studying theology at Leiden University in 1917, both on a scholarship founded by 18th-century Frisian preacher Klaas Tigler. In Leiden, he joined the religious student fraternity 'Quisque Suis Viribus', but left in 1920 citing an inability to fit in with the "spiritual atmosphere" of the group. In 1922, he married Geertruida Johanna de Klerk, with whom he would have 4 children.

Despite his gradual abandoning of the Christian faith as a student, Noordenbos completed his church exam in 1921 and was ordained, though he did not take up employment as a minister, instead becoming an assistant at the Rotterdam municipal library while working on his PhD thesis. In 1931, he obtained his PhD in theology at Leiden University with a thesis on atheism in the Netherlands in the nineteenth century, focusing primarily on the history of the early humanist newspaper De Dageraad, as well as figures such as Johannes van Vloten and Multatuli. He would continue to label himself as a theologian throughout his life, seeing the study of Christian thinkers as a scientific endeavour which should be free from church dogma.

== Intellectual career ==
In the 1930s, Noordenbos became involved with historian Jan Romeijn, contributing two chapters to Romeijn's 1934 book De Lage Landen bij de zee. That same year, he became conservator at the Rotterdam municipal library, a position which he would hold until he was fired by the German occupying forces in 1943. He regained that position in 1945, but chose to resign voluntarily the next year. In 1937, Noordenbos wrote a brochure Religie en Nationaalsocialisme for the Committee of Vigilance of anti-National Socialist Intellectuals, in which Romeijn was also involved, in which he labeled Nazism as a "pseudo-religion", with the Judeo-Bolshevik cast in the role of devil. He also wrote extensively on Erasmus, co-translating some of his letters in 1936 and publishing a book on Erasmus's Christian influences in 1941.

In 1944, after being fired as conservator, Noordenbos became a head editor of the Eerste Nederlandse Systematisch Ingerichte Encyclopaedie, an encyclopedia which sought to combat the growing specialisation of science and enlighten the working class. He also contributed articles on libraries and free-thinking himself. In 1945, Noordenbos moved to Amsterdam, where he became involved in local humanist organisations, and together with Jan Romeijn and Nico Donkersloot founded a left-wing humanist monthly, De Nieuwe Stem, for which Noordenbos served as editor.

During this period, Noordenbos became active as a public intellectual speaking in support of humanism, holding "humanist radio lectures" during morning broadcasts of the socialist radio broadcaster VARA. He also continued writing, editing a book series Gastmaal der Eeuwen on important European cultural figures to which he contributed a work on St. Augustine in 1952, producing a liber amicorum for Jan Romeijn in 1953 and, together with Edward Brongersma, publishing an exchange in 1954 on the social and political influence of the Catholic Church, which Noordenbos saw as a threat to free thought. From 1954 to 1958, he led the effort to translate Alexander Randa's world history Handbuch der Weltgeschichte, which was published as the five-volume Geschiedenis der Mensheid between 1956 and 1962.

== Entry into politics ==
In 1952, Noordenbos was one of the signatories of the "Derde Weg" manifesto, which sought "deep structural changes" in Dutch society as well as a neutral position between the two blocs of the Cold War. After efforts to get pacifist candidates on the electoral list of the Labour Party (PvdA) failed, Noordenbos would participate in the founding of the Pacifist Socialist Party (PSP) in 1957. The next year, he was elected to the North Holland provincial council, in which he would serve as member, and as leader of the PSP group from 1962, until 1968.

Following the death of Nico van der Veen, Noordenbos became a member of the House of Representatives for the PSP on 7 June 1962. As an MP, he spoke primarily on matters of education, foreign affairs, defence, economic affairs and social affairs. He chose not to run for re-election in the 1963 Dutch general election because of his advanced age. In 1967, the North Holland provincial council passed a motion submitted by Noordenbos ending the practice of beginning each session with a prayer. Despite his membership of the PSP, a pacifist political party, Noordenbos was not completely opposed to violence, speaking out in favour of violent resistance against Apartheid following the Sharpeville massacre in 1960.

== Later life ==
After his retirement, Noordenbos continued writing about theological developments. Oene Noordenbos died in Amersfoort on 24 June 1978.
