= Eelco Alta =

Frisian clergyman, theologian, and veterinarian

- Born: June 23, 1723; Makkum, Súdwest-Fryslân, Netherlands
- Died: August 17, 1798 (aged 75)
- Education: University of Franeker (theology)
- Occupations: clergyman theologian veterinarian

Eelco Alta (23 June 1723, in Makkum, Súdwest-Fryslân – 17 August 1798, in Bozum) was a Frisian clergyman, theologian, and veterinarian.

== Education ==
Eelco Alta was born in 1723 in the coastal village of Makkum, and studied theology at the University of Franeker from 1737 until 1745, when he started as a minister in the nearby villages of Beers and Jellum. After nine years he moved to the main protestant church of Boazum, where he was to spend almost all of the next fifty years. He was politically active in the last years of the Dutch Republic, siding (although not explicitly) with the forces of republican "Patriotism", partly for religious reasons. During the royalist backlash of the late 1780s, this caused him some problems: some of his sons were actively persecuted, while he was forced to leave Boazum between 1790 and the Batavian Revolution of 1795. Thereafter, he shortly served as a member of the newly installed parliament of the Batavian Republic, but afterward admitted to prefer spending his time with his congregation.

== Veterinary medicine ==
Already during his time at university, Alta's aptitude for scholarly work outside of theology was recognized and resulted in his (unsuccessful) candidature for the chair of Philosophy at the University of Franeker. He made important contributions to veterinary medicine and published, among others, about the natural causes of cattle diseases. In 1780, the Society for the Advancement of Agriculture in Amsterdam (Maatschappij ter bevordering van den Landbouw) awarded him 30 golden guineas for his efforts in promoting vaccination against Rinderpest, about which he submitted an extensive treaty to the society.

== Astronomy ==
Initially anonymously, Alta authored a treatise in 1774, Philosophical Considerations concerning the Conjunction of the Planets Jupiter, Mars, Venus, Mercury and the Moon. To be happening on the Eighth of May 1774, and about the Possible and Likely Astronomical and Physical Consequences of this Conjunction, which was to secure his lasting fame. It was long said to have motivated Eise Eisinga to build his famous planetarium (or orrery) in Franeker. According to the canonicised view, Alta stated that the upcoming conjunction of the planets with the sun would herald the apocalypse, and through his planetarium, Eisinga was able to prove that in fact, the conjunction would not take place. Modern research has however come to the more prosaic conclusion that Eisinga was mainly motivated by practical motives - most of all not having to calculate the orbits and respective positions of the planets and the sun on paper, but instead using his planetarium as a reference. The construction of the orrery appears to have begun before Alta published his treatise.

The main square in the village of Boazum is named Altaplein in his honor.

== Works (selection) ==
- Eelco Alta (1742), Dissertatio tertia ad vaticinia Danielis de ventre ac lateribus æneis in statua et tertia bestia ac ariete bicorne cap. II: 32. VII: 6. VIII: 3 / qvam ... præside ... Hermanno Venema ... publice defendendam suscipiet Eelko Alta (Dissertation, Franeker University).
- Eelco Alta (1765), Verhandelinge over de natuurlyke oorzaaken der ziekte onder het rund-vee en derzelver langere duuringe als te vooren, waar in ... de in-enting derzelve ... wordt aangepreezen : gaande vooraf twee vertoogen, gezonden aan de Hollandse Maatschappy der Weetenschappen, ter beantwoording eener vraag over deeze stoffe in 1759 voorgesteld en in 1760 herhaald. (Leeuwarden: Wigerus Wigeri).
- Eelco Alta (1769), Nodige raadgeevingen aan overheden en ingezetenen, dewelke in het bijzonder voor den boer in deeze akelige omstandigheden, waarin het vaderland zig door de ziekte van het rundvee thans bevind, van zeer veel nut kunnen zijn. (Leeuwarden: H.A. de Chalmot).
- Eelco Alta (as "Een Liefhebber der Waarheid", 1774), Philosophische bedenkingen over de conjunctie van de planeten, Jupiter, Mars, Venus, Mercurius en de Maan, op den 8en May 1774 staande te gebeuren, en wel over de mogelijke en waarschijnlijke sterre- en natuurkundige gevolgen deezer conjunctie. (Leeuwarden: Wumkes).
- Nicolaas Ypeij, Eelco Alta & Sj. Meinerts (1781), Een drietal gekroonde prysverhandelingen over de vraage: Of het voor de provincie van Friesland voordeeliger zij, den uitvoer van hooi ééns voor al te verbieden of wel voor altoos onbepaald open te stellen? Dan wel of het beter zij, dat de wetgever na gelegenheid den uitvoer bestiert en welke jaartijd tot die bepaaling, met betrekking tot de veehoederij, de geschikste zij? (Harlingen: V. van der Plaats).
- Eelco Alta (1795), Raadgeevingen aan alle ingezetenen van Friesland, van welke staat, conditie en religie zij mogen zijn als mijne waarde broeders en medeburgers. (Sneek: Leeuw).

== Literature ==
- (in Dutch) Nieuw Nederlands Biografisch Woordenboek (NNBW)
- (in Dutch) Biografisch Lexicon voor de Geschiedenis van het Nederlands Protestantisme
