= Hegebeintumer Mûne =

Windmill in Hegebeintum, Netherlands

Hegebeintumer Mûne, Hegebeintum
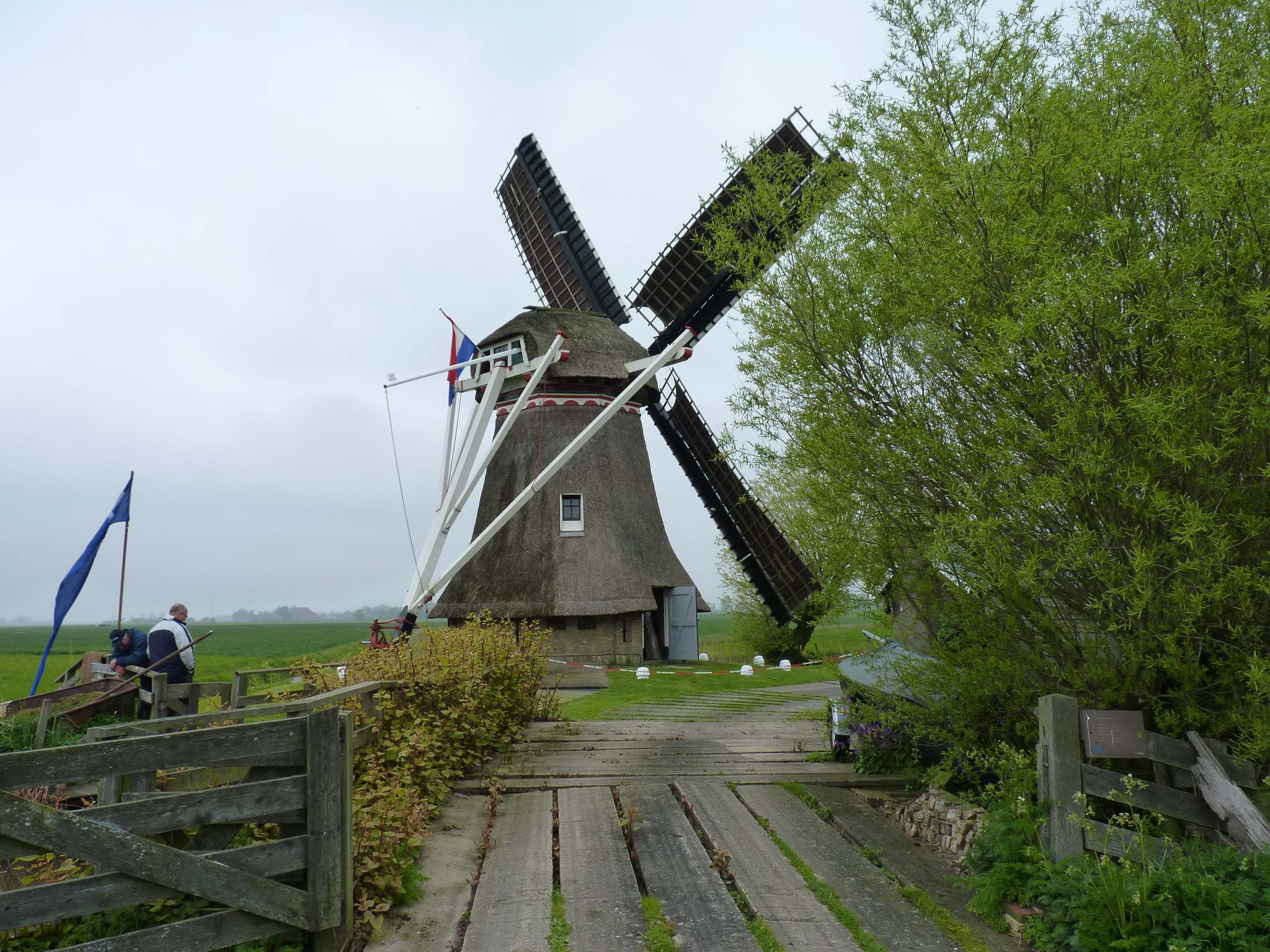
- Hegebeintumer Mûne, May 2010

Origin
- Mill name: Hegebeintumer Mûne
- Mill location: Mieddyk 6, 9173 GG Hegebeintum
- Coordinates: 53°19′33″N 5°51′07″E
- Operator(s): Stichting De Fryske Mole
- Year built: 1860

Information
- Purpose: Drainage mill
- Type: Smock mill
- Storeys: Two-storey smock
- Base storeys: Single-storey base
- Smock sides: Eight sides
- No. of sails: Four sails
- Type of sails: Common sails
- Windshaft: Cast iron
- Winding: Tailpole and winch
- Type of pump: Archimedes' screw

The Hegebeintumer Mûne (Dutch: Hogebeintumermolen) is a smock mill in Hegebeintum, Friesland, Netherlands which was built in 1860. The mill has been restored to working order. It is listed as a Rijksmonument, number 15629.

== History ==
A mill stood on this site in 1830. The Hegebeintumer Mûne was built in 1860. It drained part of the De Mear polder. On 8 May 1969, the local water board put forward a plan to mechanise the mill because nobody could be found to work it. Permission was reluctantly granted by the Provincial Mills Commission. The Hegebeintumer Mûne was in regular use until 1973. The mill was sold to Stichting De Fryske Mole (English: Frisian Mills Foundation) on 4 May 1976 and restored in 1977. In 2006, the mill was officially listed as being held in reserve for use in an emergency.

== Description ==
The Hegebeintumer Mûne is what the Dutch describe as an grondzeiler. It is a two-storey smock mill on a single-storey base. There is no stage, the sails reaching almost to the ground. The mill is winded by tailpole and winch. The smock and cap are thatched. The sails are Common sails. They have a span of 15.70 metres (51 ft 6 in). The sails are carried on a cast-iron windshaft, which was cast by Prins van Oranje, The Hague. The windshaft also carries the brake wheel which has 47 cogs. This drives the wallower (26 cogs) at the top of the upright shaft. At the bottom of the upright shaft, the crown wheel, which has 30 cogs drives a gearwheel with 28 cogs on the axle of the Archimedes' screw. The axle of the Archimedes' screw is 420 millimetres (1 ft 5 in) diameter. The screw is 1.22 metres (4 ft 0 in) diameter and 3.80 metres (12 ft 6 in) long. It is inclined at 19½°. Each revolution of the screw lifts 773 litres (170 imp gal) of water.

== Public access ==
The Hegebeintumer Mûne is open by appointment.
