= Canon of Curaçao =

Summary of the history of Curaçao

The Canon of Curaçao is a list of fifty themes (called "windows") that chronologically summarizes the history of Curaçao. In the windows 50 subjects are described in approximately 400 words each. Complementing the Canon of the Netherlands and its regional canons, the Canon of Curaçao was compiled on the initiative of the General Faculty of the University of Curaçao (UoC), for the purpose of history education.

In 2020, the canon was released by a committee appointed by the University of Curaçao, the Curaçao National Archives (Dutch: Nationaal Archief Curaçao, NAC), and the Foundation for School Materials (Papiamento: Fundashon Material pa Skol, FMS). The committee members are:

- Dr. R. M. Allen, anthropologist, part-time lecturer at UoC
- Drs. E. Baetens, former geography teacher and FMS employee
- Drs. W. Kamps, former staff member of the General Faculty of UoC
- Drs. M. Scriwanek, director of the NAC
- Drs. R. Sille, former history teacher and rector of the Kolegio Alejandro Paula (KAP)
- Drs. H. Vlinkervleugel, chairman of the Curaçao association of history teachers
- Drs. I. Witteveen, former director of the National Archaeological Anthropological Museum (NAAM) and former FMS employee

== The 50 windows ==
	Theme	Period	Description
1	The original inhabitants	5000 BCE–500	The pre-ceramic or archaic period
2	The Spanish period	1499–1634	The first European settlers and administrators
3	The conquest of Curaçao by the WIC and the arrival of the Dutch	1634–1665	The conquest of Curaçao
4	New inhabitants in the seventeenth century	1634–1700	Introduction of the plantation economy
5	The slave trade and slavery	1672–1713	Curaçao as slave market
6	Resistance to slavery	18th century	Rebellion of enslaved Africans
7	Tula	1795	From slave leader to national hero
8	Papiamentu	from 1700	From colloquial language to creole language
9	Curaçao around 1800	1795–1803	Seizures of power
10	The development of Willemstad	from 1634	Urban development
11	The development of habitation outside Willemstad	from 1634	The population of Bandabou
12	Brión, Piar and Bolívar	18th century	Historical heroes
13	The plantation system of Curaçao	from 1634	Running an agricultural business
14	The abolition of slavery	1 July 1863	Emancipation
15	The structure of society in the first half of the nineteenth century	19th century	Social status based on skin color
16	Buildings	from 1634	Architecture of Curaçao
17	The defense of Curaçao	from 1634	Defensive works
18	Employment and emigration between 1863 and 1920	1863–1920	Regional labor migration
19	Mining industry	from 1634	Salt, guano, phosphate, and limestone
20	The arrival of Catholic religious from the Netherlands	from 1715	The mission among the Afro-Curaçaoan population
21	The arrival of the oil industry	from 1912	Establishment of the Shell refinery
22	The new immigrants on Curaçao from the beginning of the twentieth century	20th century	Migrant flows
23	The harbor	from 1634	Harbor and economy
24	The labor movement	20th century	Origin and development
25	The Second World War	1940–1945	War and neutrality
26	Dr. M. F. da Costa Gomez	1907–1966	Curaçaoan statesman
27	Universal suffrage	1948	Political emancipation
28	The charter	15 December 1954	Reformed relations within the Kingdom
29	The sixties – an atmosphere of change	1960–1969	Emergence of the trade union system
30	Thirty May 1969	30 May 1969	Rebellion against oppression
31	Women's emancipation	20th century	Elimination of social inequality
32	The cultural dynamics of the seventies	from c. 1970	Attention to domestic art and culture
33	Departure of Shell, arrival and departure of PDVSA	1976–2019	Management of the oil refinery
34	The political developments from the charter to 10 October 2010	1954–2010	Autonomization and decentralization of governance
35	From ‘Oil as King’ to ‘Tourism as King’	20th century	Pillars of the economy
36	Sports: small island – great sportspeople – Andruw Jones	20th century	International sports achievements
37	Visual arts in the 20th century	20th century	Curaçaoan artists
38	Carnival	from 1872	Origin and development of the folk festival
39	Water	20th century	Water sources, supply, and use
40	Elis Juliana and Paul Brenneker	20th century	Pioneers of Curaçaoan cultural heritage
41	Education on Curaçao	19th and 20th century	Emergence, access and structure
42	The plural society	from 1915	Economy, labor and diversity
43	Getting along with nature	from 1499	Interaction between humans and nature
44	Religion and religious celebrations	1965	Entry and multiplicity of religions
45	The relation with Venezuela	from 1634	Administrative, economic and trade relations
46	The lives of Curaçaoans in the diaspora	from 1880	Emigration and remigration
47	The other islands of the former Netherlands Antilles	from 1635	Connection with Aruba, Bonaire, Sint Maarten, Sint Eustatius, and Saba
48	The development of telecommunications	from 1887	History of the means of communication
49	Transport	from 1880	The development of road, sea, and air transport
50	Media	from 1812	The development of the media

== See also ==
- Canon of the Netherlands
- Canon of Amsterdam
- Canon of Friesland
- Canon of Gelderland
- Canon of Groningen
- Canon of Limburg
- Canon of Zeeland
- Canon of South Holland
