= Eerste Nederlandse Systematisch Ingerichte Encyclopaedie =

Dutch encyclopedia published between 1946 and 1952

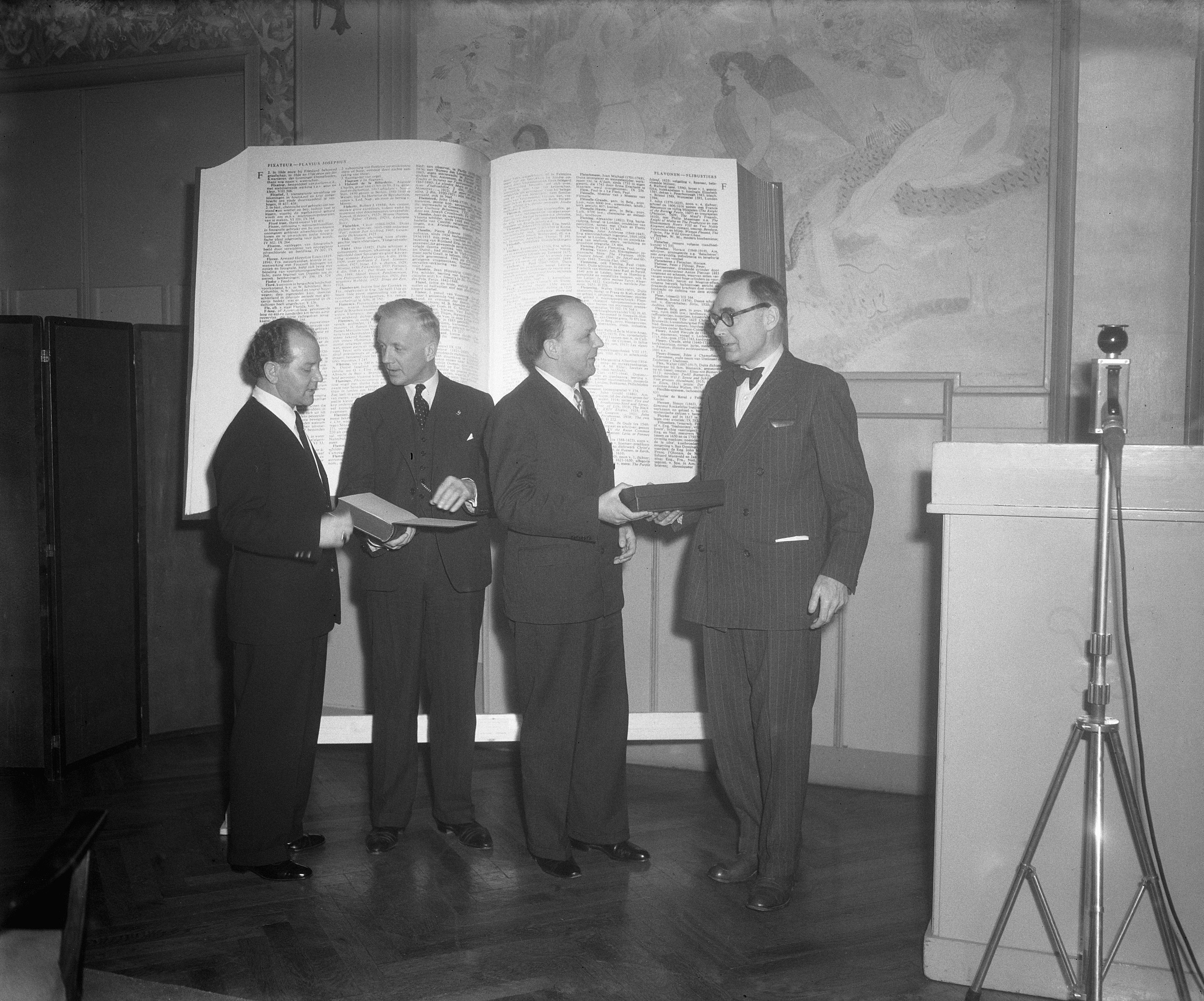
Presentation of Part 10 of the Encyclopaedia (1952). Left to right: Frederic von Eugen, Arnold Jan d'Ailly, Hendrik Jan Reinink, Hans Kramers.

The Eerste Nederlandse Systematisch Ingerichte Encyclopaedie (abbr. E.N.S.I.E., "First Dutch Systematically Arranged Encyclopaedia"), is a Dutch language encyclopaedia at first in ten volumes of which the first volume appeared in 1946 and the tenth, the alphabetical lexicon, in 1952. In 1959 and 1960 a Supplement and a revised Lexicon were added. It was published in Amsterdam under the redaction of Prof. Dr Hendrik Pos, Prof. Dr J. M. Romein, Prof. Dr H. A. Kramers, Dr Oene Noordenbos and others.

The volumes I through IX deal with various subjects in their context. The full size of the ten volumes measures around half a meter.

1. Philosophy, religion, psychology, education (1946, Prof. Dr H. de Vos and Prof. Dr Ph. Kohnstamm)
2. Linguistics, visual arts, music, performing arts (1947, Prof. Dr Anton Reichling S.J. and Jhr Dr J. S. Witsen Elias)
3. History, sociology, cultural anthropology, sociography, economy, political science (1947, Dr H. A. Enno van Gelder, Prof. Dr J. P. Kruijt, Prof. Dr J. R. M. van den Brink, Prof. Mr J. Valkhoff)
4. Mathematics, physics, chemistry, astronomy (1949, Prof. Dr J. A. Prins)
5. Geodesy and cartography, geophysics, geology, oceanography, meteorology, biosphere, human geography (1948, Prof. Dr B. G. Escher and Prof. Dr A. N. J. den Hollander)
6. Biology, anthropology, medicine, pharmacy (1949, Prof. Dr C. J. van der Klauw, Prof. Dr H. J. Lam and Prof. Dr G. O. E. Lignac)
7. Veterinary medicine; agriculture; nutsbedrijven, traffic, publicity, radio, television, commerce, banking and insurance; statistics, management science, economical politics and social politics; planning (1950, Prof. Dr G. Krediet, Mr J. Baert, J A C. Bot and Prof. Dr S. Kleerekoper)
8. Engineering (1950, Ir H. Steketee and Ir J. J. Ochtman)
9. Civil engineering, arts and crafts, lifestyle and recreation, war and warfare, inventions and discoveries, scientific research (1950, J A C. Bot and Prof. Ir R. J. Forbes)
10. Lexicon and index (1952, Dr W. Cahn)
11. Supplement (1959, H. de Vos)
12. Updated Lexicon and index with a world history overview (1960, H.J. Pos)

== Bibliography ==
- Volume I: Pos, H.J.; de Vos, H.; Kohnstamm, Ph. (1946). de Vos, H.; Kohnstamm, Ph. (eds.). Eerste Nederlandse systematisch ingerichte encyclopaedie / Dl. 1, Wijsbegeerte, Godsdienst, Psychologie, Opvoeding en onderwijs. Eerste Nederlandse systematisch ingerichte encyclopaedie (in Dutch). Amsterdam: E.N.S.I.E. OCLC 768996033.
- Volume II: Pos, H.J.; Reichling, Anton; Witsen Elias, J.S. (1946). Reichling, Anton; Witsen Elias, J.S. (eds.). Eerste Nederlandse systematisch ingerichte encyclopaedie / Dl. 2, Taal en letterkunde, Beeldende kunsten, Muziek, dans, toneel, film. Eerste Nederlandse systematisch ingerichte encyclopaedie (in Dutch). Amsterdam: E.N.S.I.E. OCLC 768996034.
- ..
- Volume X: Pos, H.J.; Cahn, W. (1952). Cahn, W. (ed.). Eerste Nederlandse systematisch ingerichte encyclopaedie / Dl. 10 Lexicon en register. Eerste Nederlandse systematisch ingerichte encyclopaedie (in Dutch). Amsterdam: E.N.S.I.E. OCLC 768998069.
- Volume XI: Pos, H.J.; de Vos, H. (1959). de Vos, H. (ed.). Eerste Nederlandse systematisch ingerichte encyclopaedie / Dl. 11 Supplement. Eerste Nederlandse systematisch ingerichte encyclopaedie (in Dutch). Amsterdam: E.N.S.I.E. OCLC 768998071.
- Volume XII: Pos, H.J. (1960). Eerste Nederlandse systematisch ingerichte encyclopaedie / Dl. 12 Lexicon en register : beknopt overzicht der wereldgeschiedenis in synchronistische tabellen. Eerste Nederlandse systematisch ingerichte encyclopaedie (in Dutch). Amsterdam: E.N.S.I.E. OCLC 768998072.
