= Canon of Groningen =

Summary of the history of Groningen

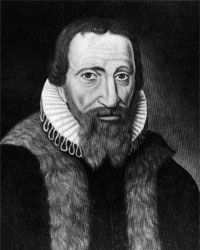
Ubbo Emmius

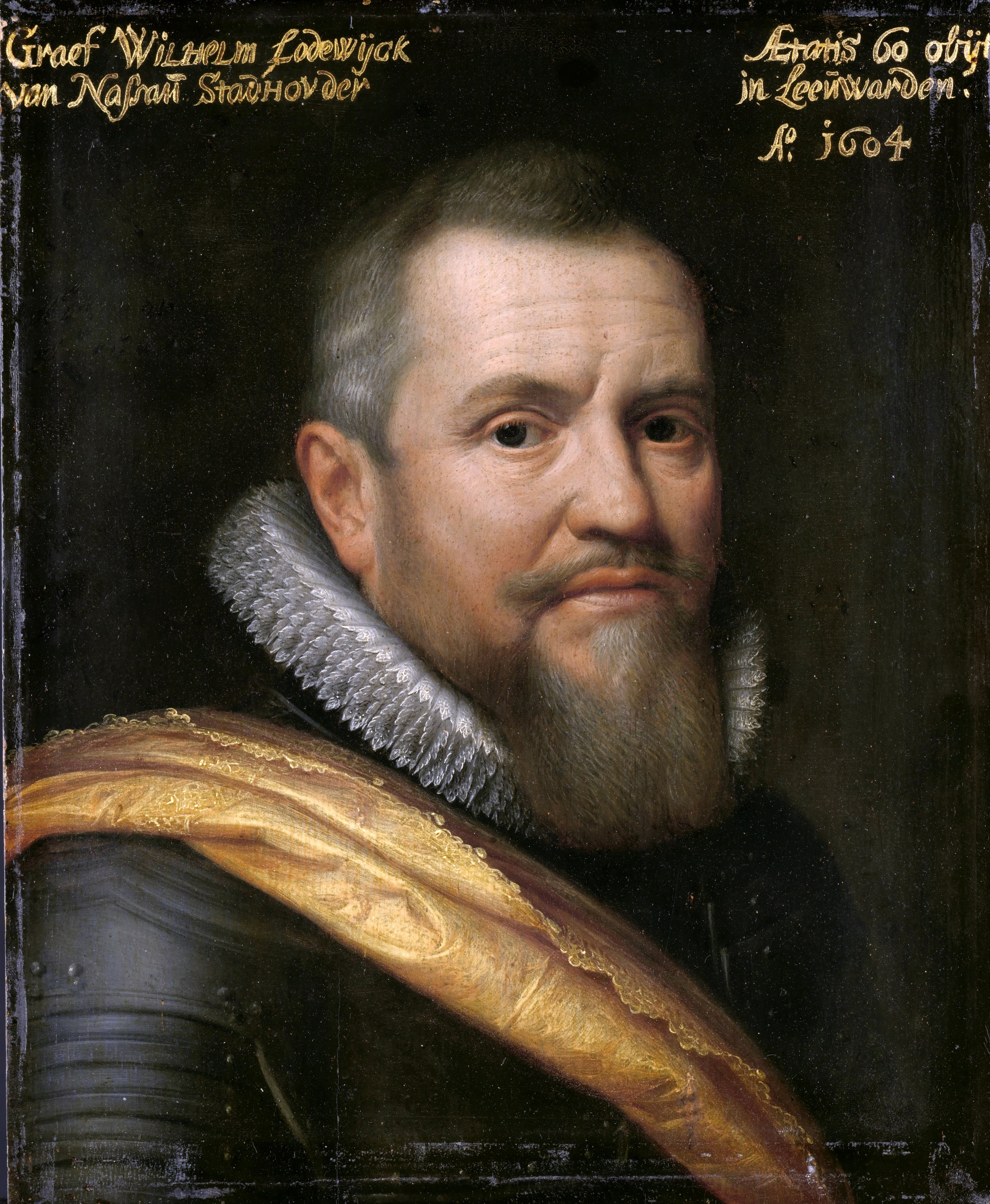
William Louis, Count of Nassau-Dillenburg

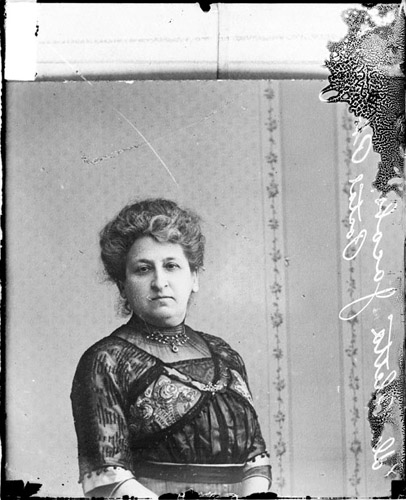
Aletta Jacobs

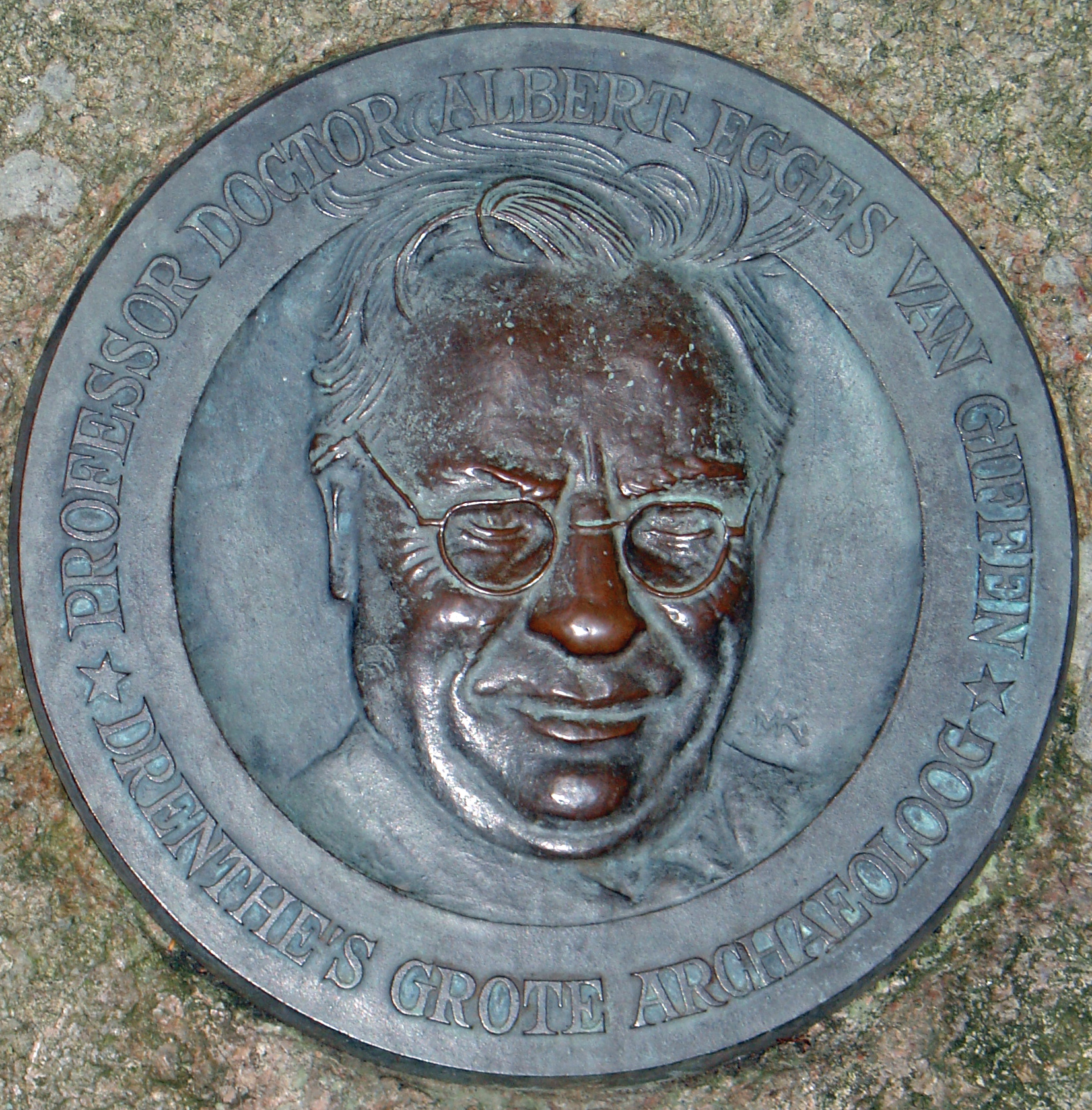
Albert Egges van Giffen

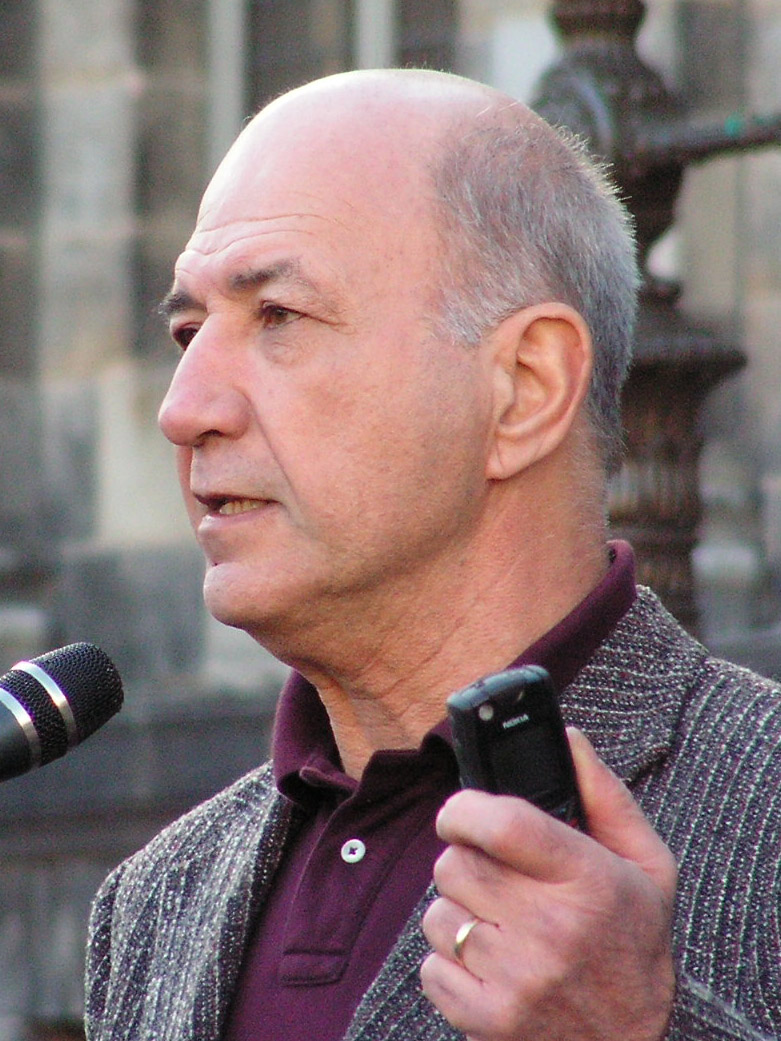
Wubbo Ockels

The Canon of Groningen is a list of 40 hallmarks and 52 icons that provides a chronological summary of the history of the city and province of Groningen.

The canon is an initiative of the former Huis van de Groninger Cultuur (since 2017 the Centrum Groninger Taal en Cultuur), the Cultuurhistorische vereniging Stad en Lande and the Regional Historic Center Groninger Archieven. On 8 May 2008, the canon was launched by the Queen's Commissioner Max van den Berg by firing a cannon at the Groninger Archieven. The canon has appeared in print and can be viewed online. This is the first provincial canon after the publication of the Canon of the Netherlands in 2006.

== Hallmarks ==
A selection of themes covered in the canon:

- 1. Hunebedden (3000 BCE–2000 BCE)
- 10. The staple right (1473–1798)
- 13. Battle of Heiligerlee (1568)
- 14. The Reduction (1594)
- 24. Patriotten and prinsgezinden (1780–1795)
- 27. The Afscheiding (1834–1840)
- 32. De Ploeg (1918–present)
- 37. The Gas Bubble of Slochteren (1959–present)
- 40. Blauwe Stad (2005)

== Icons ==
1. Ludger (742–809), missionary
2. Walfridus of Bedum (10th/11th century), martyr
3. Emo of Friesland (c. 1175–1237), abbot and chronicler
4. Menko of Bloemhof (born 1213), abbot and chronicler
5. Rodolphus Agricola (1444–1485), humanist scholar
6. Beetke of Rasquert (died 1554), businesswoman
7. Bartholt Entens of Mentheda (1539–1580), watergeus
8. Ubbo Emmius (1547–1625), rector magnificus
9. William Louis, Count of Nassau-Dillenburg (1560–1620), stadhouder
10. Adriaan Clant (1599–1665), diplomat
11. Carl von Rabenhaupt (1602–1675), defender of Stad and Ommelanden
12. Abel Tasman (1603–1659), explorer
13. Adriaan Geerts Wildervanck (1605–1661), peat colonist and founder of Wildervank
14. Herman Collenius (1650–1723), painter
15. Johann Bernoulli (1667–1748), mathematician, physicist, professor
16. John William, Baron Ripperda (1682–1737), ambassador
17. Rudolf de Mepsche (1695–1754), jonker and grietman
18. Daniel Bernoulli (1700–1782), mathematician, physicist, professor
19. Wilhelmus Schortinghuis (1700–1750), minister and pietist
20. Petrus Camper (1722–1789), zoologist, physician and professor
21. Geert Reinders (1737–1815), rinderpest fighter and patriot
22. Gerard Bacot (1743–1822), minister and patriot
23. Hendrik Wester (1752–1821), schoolteacher and education reformer
24. Henri Daniel Guyot (1753–1828), founder of the Henri Daniel Guyot Institute
25. Hendrik de Cock (1801–1842), minister, stood at the cradle of the Afscheiding
26. Anthony Winkler Prins (1817–1908), writer and chief editor of the Winkler Prins encyclopedia
27. Willem Albert Scholten (1819–1892), industrialist
28. Jozef Israëls (1824–1911), painter
29. Samuel van Houten (1837–1930), politician
30. Otto Eerelman (1839–1926), painter
31. Pieter Roelf Bos (1847–1902), publisher of the Bosatlas
32. Hendrik Goeman Borgesius (1847–1917), minister
33. Jacobus Kapteyn (1851–1922), astronomer and professor
34. Heike Kamerlingh Onnes (1853–1926), physicist and Nobel laureate
35. Aletta Jacobs (1854–1929), physician and women's suffrage activist
36. Jan Schaper (1868–1934), politician
37. Kornelis ter Laan (1871–1963), politician
38. Johan Huizinga (1872–1945), historian
39. Cornelis Jetses (1873–1955), illustrator
40. Hendrik Nicolaas Werkman (1882–1945), artist
41. Albert Egges van Giffen (1884–1973), archaeologist
42. Frits Zernike (1888–1966), physicist and Nobel laureate
43. Hendrik de Vries (1896–1989), poet and painter
44. Dirk Stikker (1897–1979), Secretary General of NATO and diplomat
45. Bert Röling (1906–1985), jurist
46. Sicco Mansholt (1908–1995), minister and President of the European Commission
47. Fré Meis (1921–1992), trade unionist
48. Gerrit Krol (1934–2013), writer and poet
49. Rutger Kopland (1934–2012), poet
50. Ede Staal (1941–1986), singer
51. Wubbo Ockels (1946–2014), astronaut
52. Marianne Timmer (born 1974), speed skater

== See also ==
- Canon of the Netherlands
- Canon of Amsterdam
- Canon of Friesland
- Canon of Gelderland
- Canon of Limburg
- Canon of Zeeland
- Canon of South Holland
- Canon of Curaçao
