= Eise Eisinga =

Dutch astronomer (1744–1828)

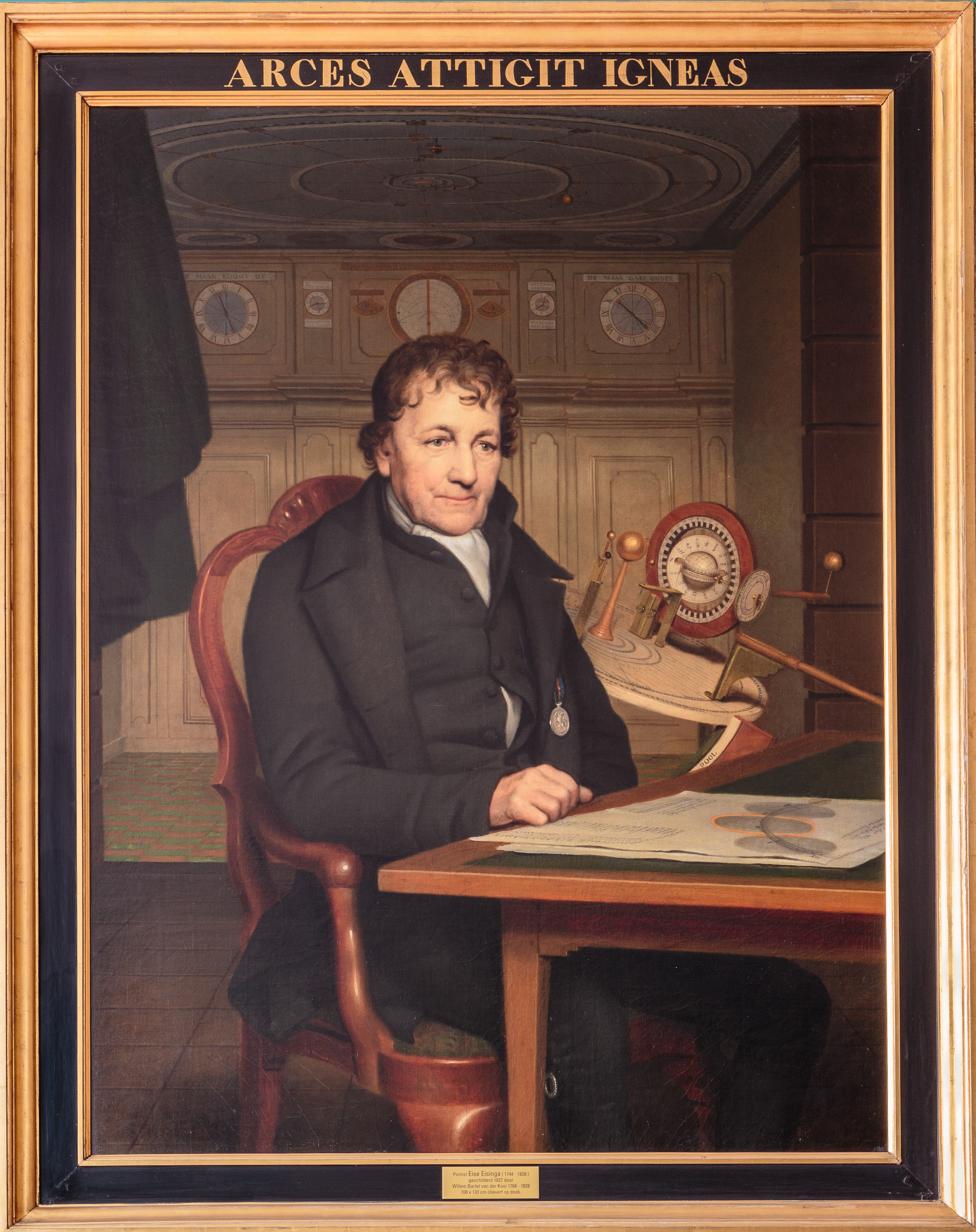
- Portrait by Willem Bartel van der Kooi (1827)
- Born: Eise Jeltes Eisinga; 21 February 1744; Dronryp, Dutch Republic
- Died: 27 August 1828 (aged 84); Franeker, Netherlands

Eise Jeltes Eisinga (21 February 1744 – 27 August 1828) was a Frisian astronomer who built the Eise Eisinga Planetarium in his house in Franeker, Dutch Republic. The orrery still exists and is the oldest functioning planetarium in the world.

== Biography ==
Eise Jeltes Eisinga was born on 21 February 1744 in Dronryp in the Dutch Republic. He was the son of Jelte Eises from Easterlittens, a wool carder, and Hitje Steffens from Winsum.

Although Eisinga was intellectually gifted, he was not allowed to go to secondary school. When he was only 17 years old, he wrote a book about mathematics and another about the principles of astronomy. Additional books about special subjects within the field of astronomy followed. Eisinga became a wool carder in Franeker, Netherlands. Through self-education he mastered mathematics and astronomy, which he also studied at the University of Franeker. At the age of 24, he married Pietje Jacobs (1748 – 18 July 1788) and they had three children, one girl and two boys.

- Trijntje (April 1773 – 26 April 1773)
- Jelte (29 May 1774 – 31 March 1809)
- Jacobus (17 March 1784 – 24 March 1858)

Due to a political crisis in 1787, Eisinga had to leave Friesland and went to Germany. Later he moved to Visvliet where he worked as a wool carder. He was banned from Friesland for five years and therefore stayed in Visvliet just across the border in Groningen. Meanwhile, his wife died, and on 27 May 1792, he married Trijntje Eelkes Sikkema (21 February 1764) in Visvliet. They had one son and two daughters.

- Eelke (14 October 1793 – 28 May 1795)
- Hittje (16 February 1796 – 8 May 1843)
- Minke (4 June 1798 – 17 July 1870)

In 1795 he returned to Franeker.

Eisinga remained a wool carder throughout his life, while running his planetarium with the help of public support, and occasionally guest lecturing at the University of Franeker, which Napoleon ordered closed in 1811.

Eisinga died on 27 August 1828, at age 84, in Franeker.

== Orrery ==
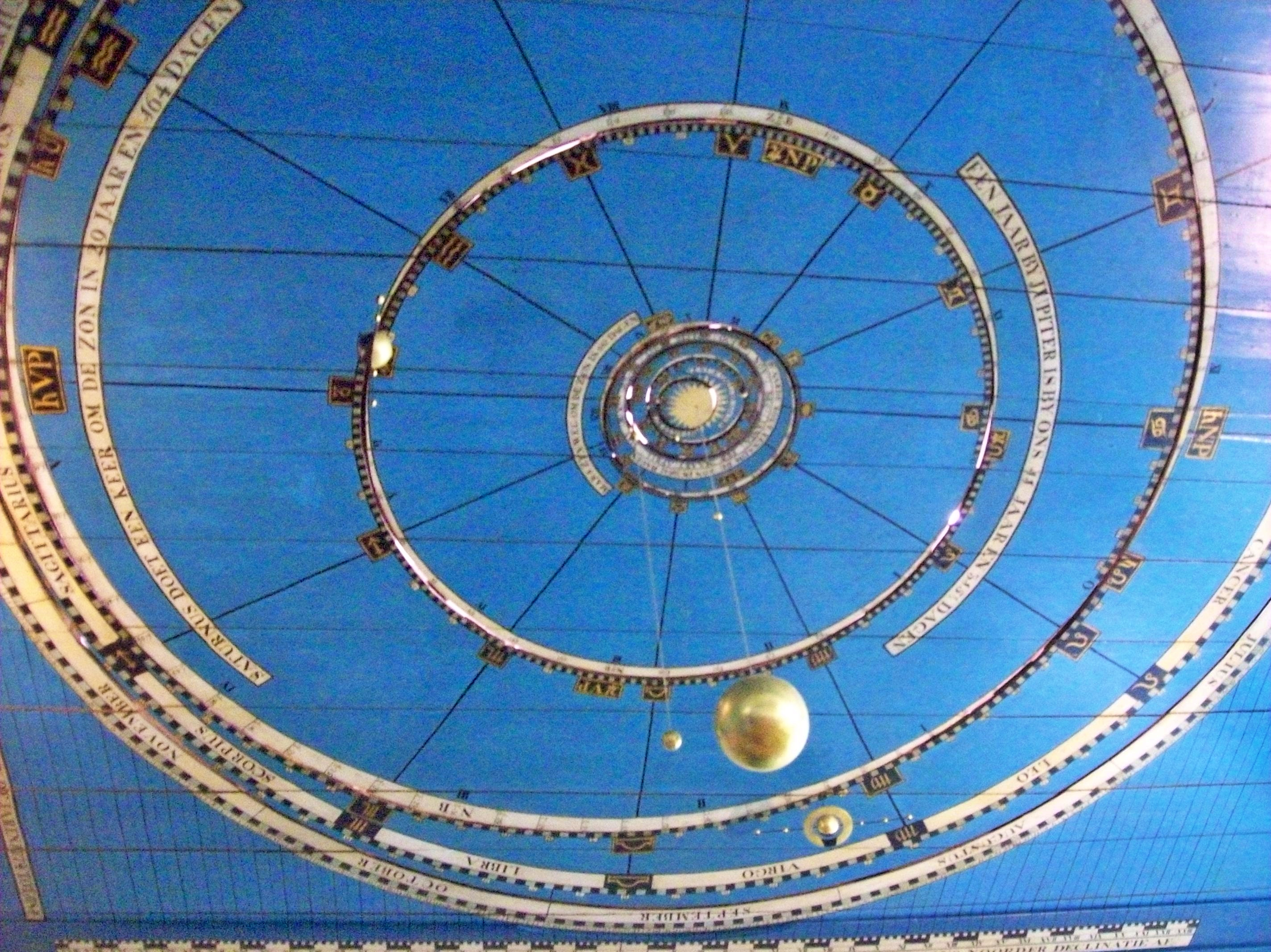
The orrery he built in his living room

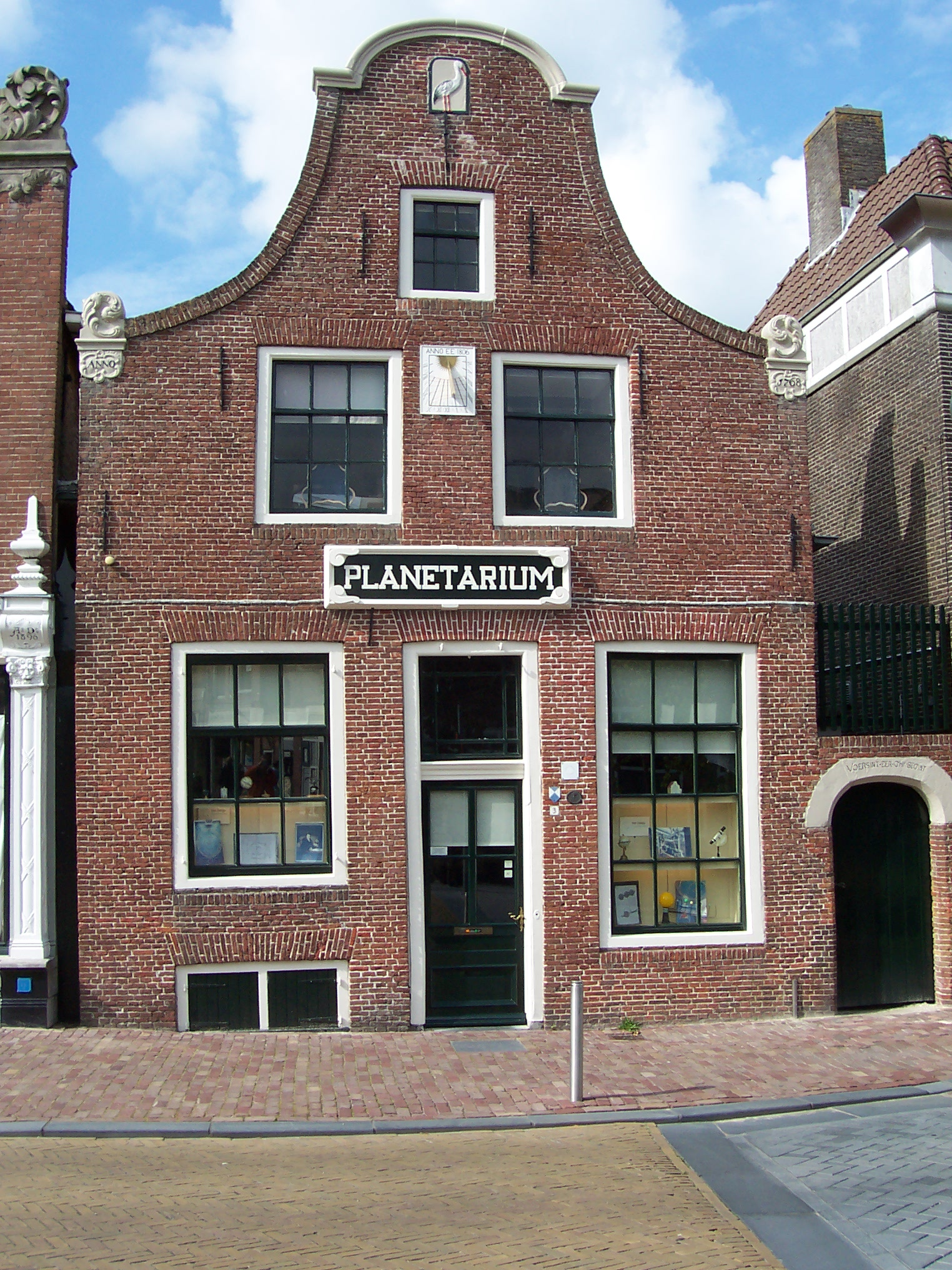
The brick building housing the orrery in Franeker in the Netherlands

On 8 May 1774 a conjunction of the moon and the planets Mercury, Venus, Mars, Jupiter was forecast to appear. Reverend Eelco Alta, from Boazum, Netherlands, published a book in which he interpreted this as a return to the state of the planets at the day of creation and a likely occasion for Armageddon. Alta predicted that the planets and the moon would collide, with the result that the Earth would be pushed out of its orbit and burned by the Sun. Due to this prediction, there was a lot of panic in Friesland.

The canonical view holds that Eisinga decided to build an orrery in his living room to prove that there was no reason for panic. He expected to finish it within six months and eventually finished it in 1781, seven years after he started. During the same year, Uranus was discovered, but there was no room for this planet on the ceiling of his living room, where the orrery was located. However, recent research indicates that this chain of causality is dubious, not least because Eijsinga appears to have commenced construction before the publication of Alta's book. The construction of the orrery saved Eijsinga a lot of time, however, because he no longer needed to calculate the planets' respective positions by hand.

On 30 June 1818, King William I of the Netherlands and Prince Frederik visited the orrery. King William I bought the orrery for the Dutch state. In 1859, the orrery was donated by the Dutch state to the city of Franeker.

== Recognition ==
Eisinga was rewarded by becoming an honorary citizen of Franeker. The street of his planetarium was renamed "Eise Eisingastraat". On 5 May 1994 an 80-cent stamp was issued by the post office to celebrate his 250th birthday. In 2006 the planetarium was given permission to use the title "royal". Eisinga was also included in the Canon of the Netherlands and the Canon of Friesland, which are taught in schools in the Netherlands and the province of Friesland, respectively.
