= Protestant church of Boazum =

Church in Boazum, Netherlands

Protestant church of Boazum Saint Martin’s church
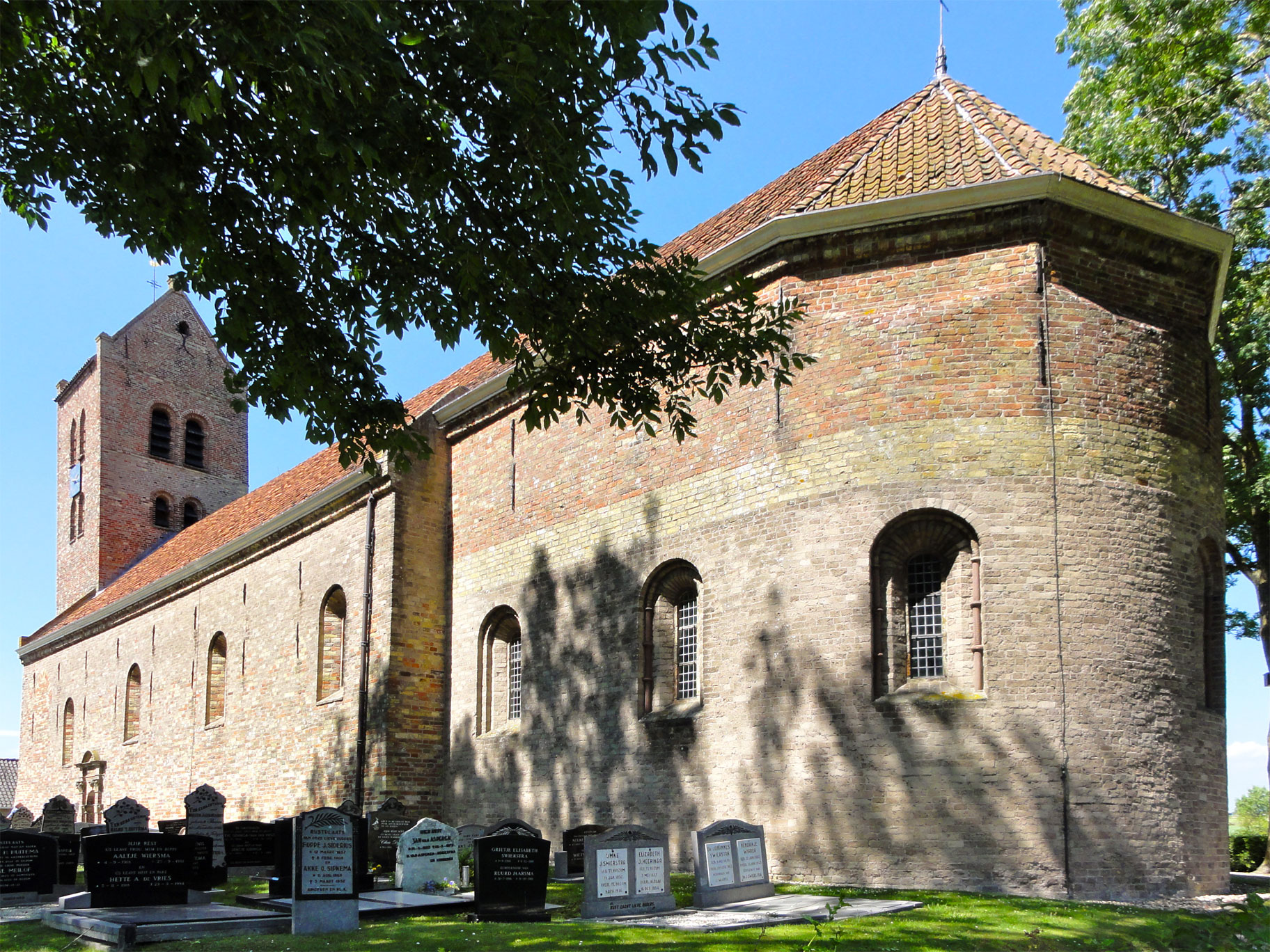
- Church of Boazum
- Protestant church of Boazum; Saint Martin’s church
- 53.0900°N 5.6963°E

History
- Dedication: Before the Reformation, to Saint Martin

The Protestant church of Boazum or Saint Martin's church is a medieval religious building in Boazum, Friesland, Netherlands. It is a late 12th century Romanesque church with inner walls of brick and outer walls of tuffstone with a 13th-century tower built out of yellow and red brick. The choir is likely the oldest part of the building.

The church was originally a Roman Catholic church dedicated to Saint Martin, becoming a Protestant church after the Protestant Reformation. It is listed as a Rijksmonument, number 8473. The building is located on the Tsjerkebuorren 1.
