= Oorijzer =

Dutch head ornament

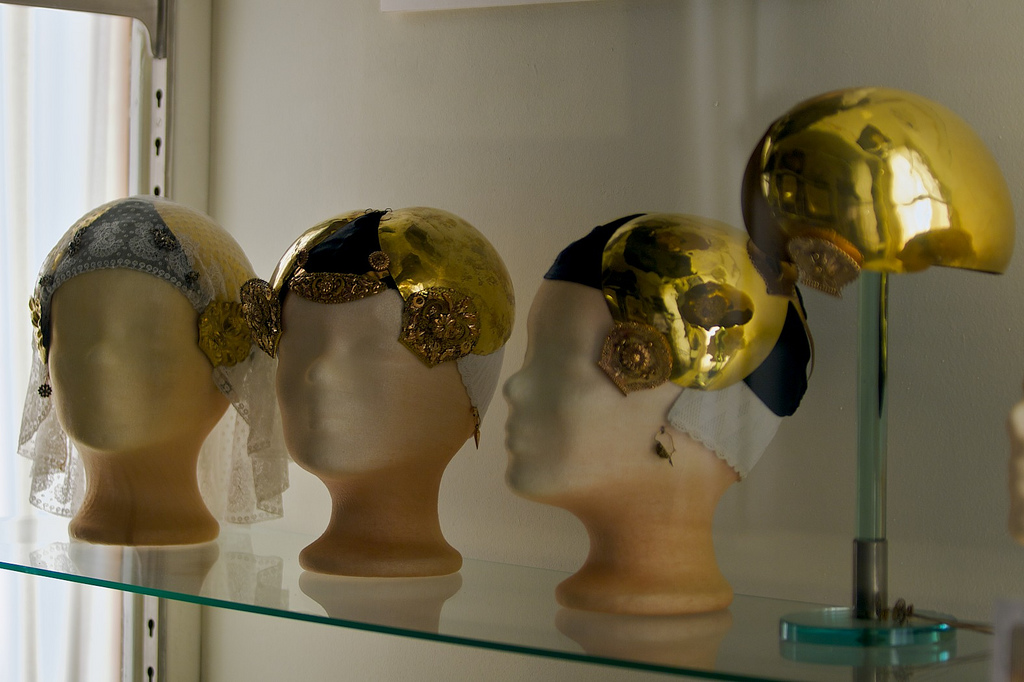
Frisian earizers from the period 1830–1870, Dokkum Museum.

The Oorijzer (West Frisian: Earizer, English: "Ear-iron") is part of the Dutch folk costume for women, especially in the northern provinces of the Netherlands and in the province of Zeeland. It was originally part of the everyday attire of the Dutch before its adoption in the regional costumes.

Initially, the oorijzer was a metal bracket to keep a cap in place. It was worn over a bottom cap and a luxurious top cap or bonnet was fastened to it. Over time, the ear-iron grew into a showpiece. Decorated gold plates or curls protruded from the front of the oorijzers. Pins were used to attach the cap to the ear-iron.

The term hoofdijzer (English: "Head-iron") is used in the Scheveningen costume. In that case, the decorations are above the forehead.

== History in Friesland ==
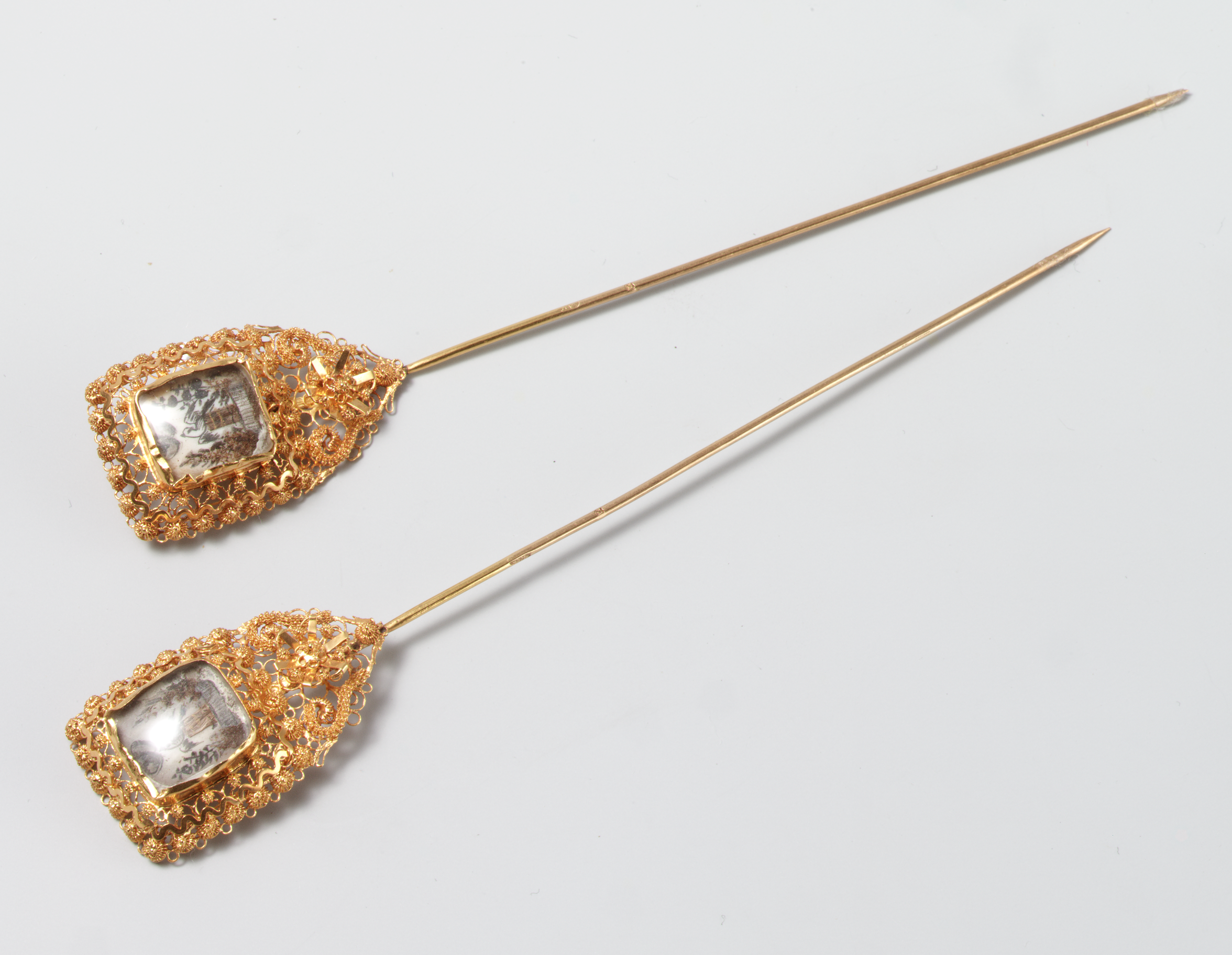
Cap pins from the collection of the Zuiderzee Museum.

The wide gold earizer that was worn in the province of Friesland around 1870 is the culmination of a three-century development. At the end of the 16th century, a narrow metal bracket became fashionable in the Netherlands for clamping a hat to the head. The side with a decorated button rested on the cheek, slightly pressing into the cheek as a result. It became a piece of jewelry made of silver or gold. However, ear-irons made of gilded copper have also been found. Around 1650 the earizer went out of fashion, but in the countryside and in orphanages, among other places, the ear-iron remained part of the dress. It was a form of dowry. Until the French period, the Frisian earizer changed little. The bracket widened slightly and the decorated button took the shape of a bird's head or griffin.

It was not until the 19th century that various forms of ear-iron emerged in the Netherlands as a specific part of Dutch regional costumes. In the publication Afbeeldingen van kleeding, zeden en gewoonten (English: "Images of clothing, mores and habits") from 1803 to 1807 there is no mention of earizers in use by women from Friesland. After the previously independent regions of the Dutch Republic came under centralized authority in the French period, the need arose in the regions to maintain their own identity. In Frisian society the wearing of the ear-iron was encouraged and underwent its own development. Prosperity was high, so the earizers became bigger and bigger. In addition, the large German cap was replaced by a cloak cap or veil cap, under which the ear-iron was more visible.

Over the course of the century, the narrow bracket became wider and wider, the buds became larger and flatter and took on the shape of a flowerpot. Around 1850, the pastor and writer Justus Hiddes Halbertsma feared that the growing earizer would eventually resemble a helmet. That happened, as by 1870 the ear-iron had grown to its largest size, almost enclosing the head.

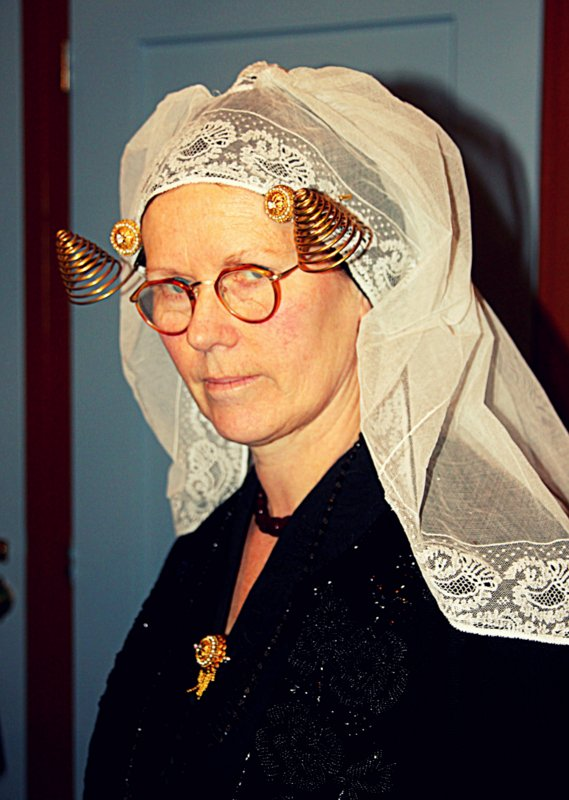
Oorijzer with gold curls (Spijkenisse, c. 1900).

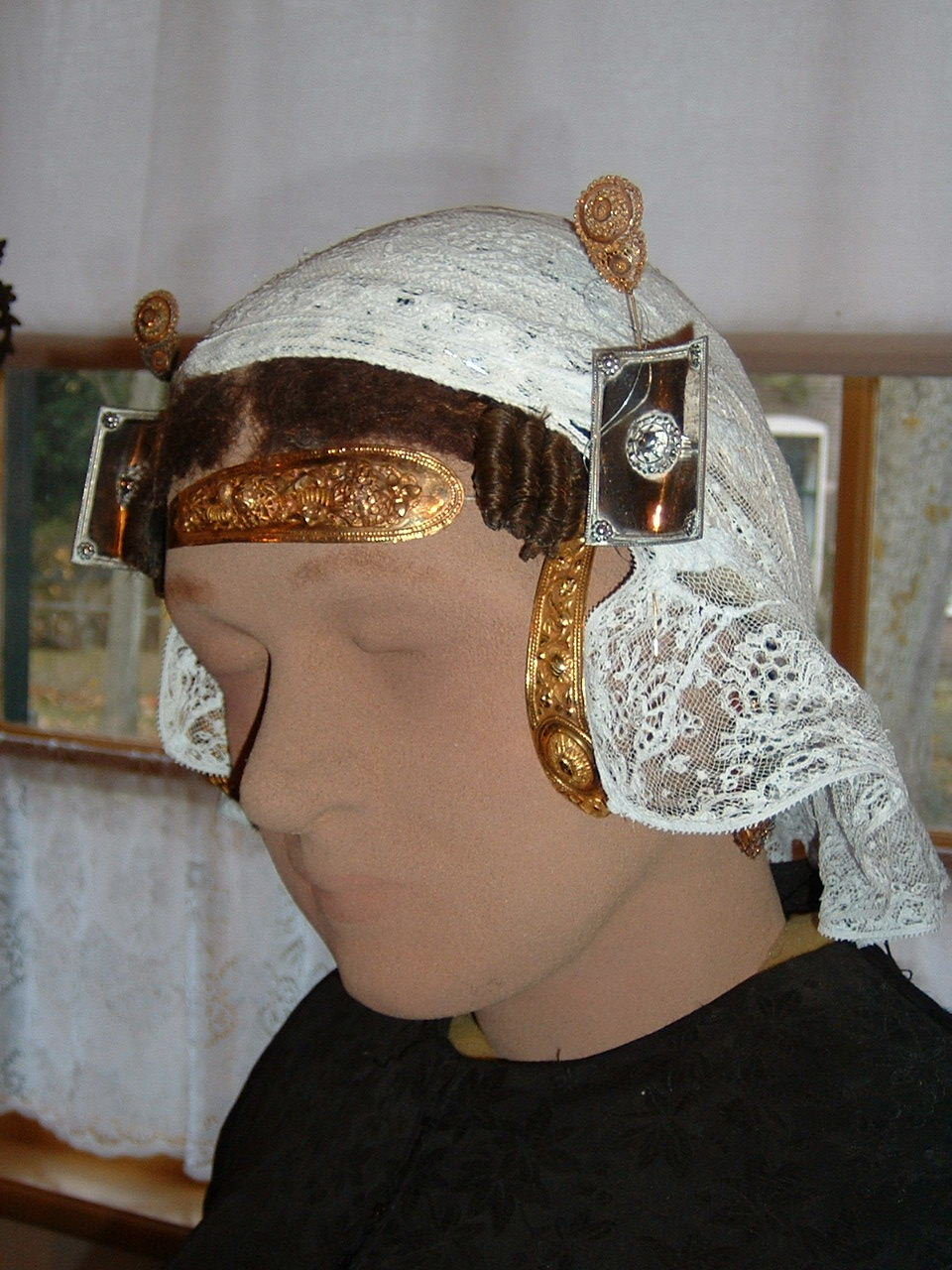
Ear-iron with gold plates (Ameland).

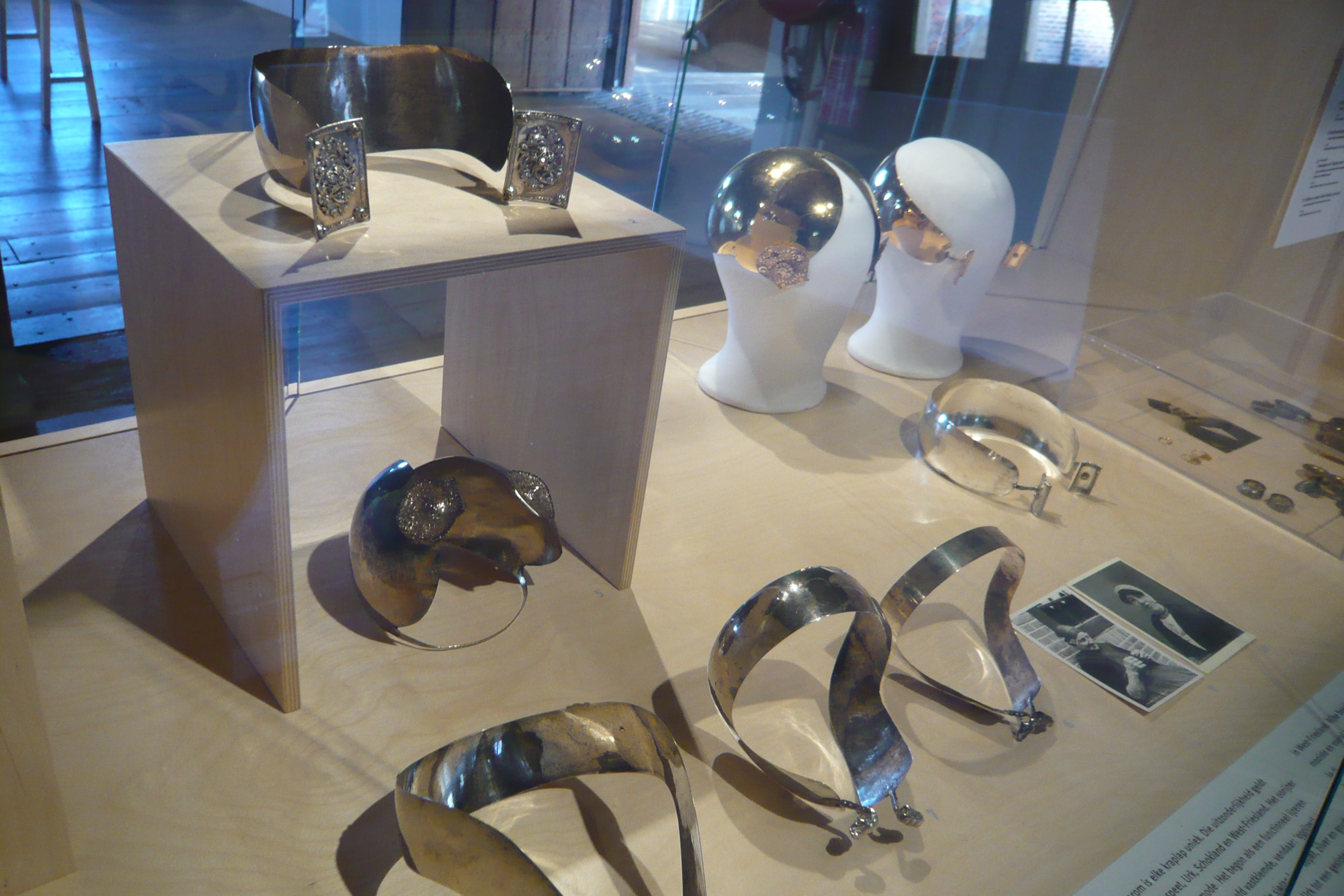
Assortment of oorijzers at the Zuiderzee Museum.

== See also ==
- Dutch cap
- Poffer
