= Hegebeintum =

Hegebeintum Hogebeintum
- Village
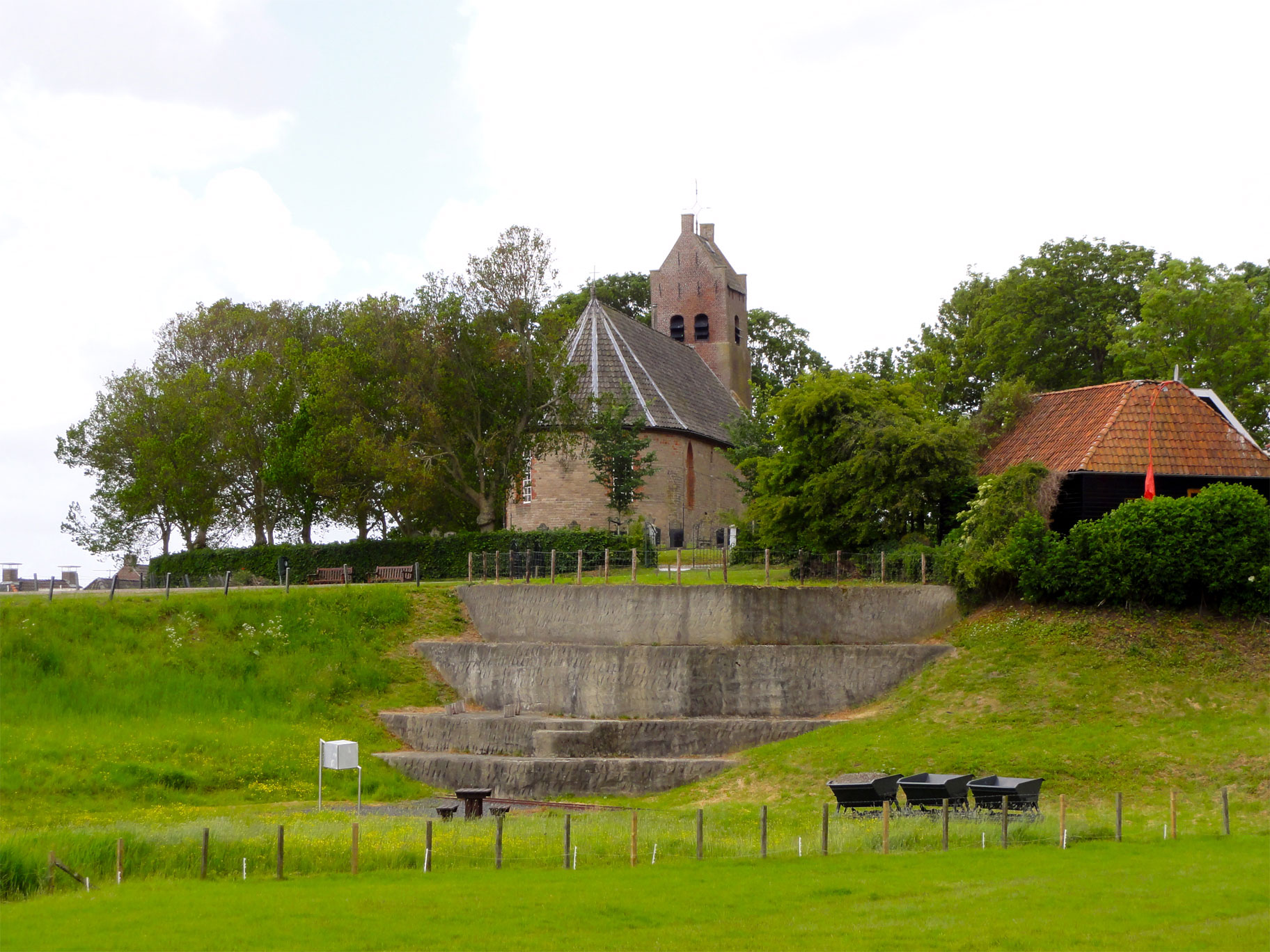
- Church and dwarf of Hegebeintum

- Flag Coat of arms

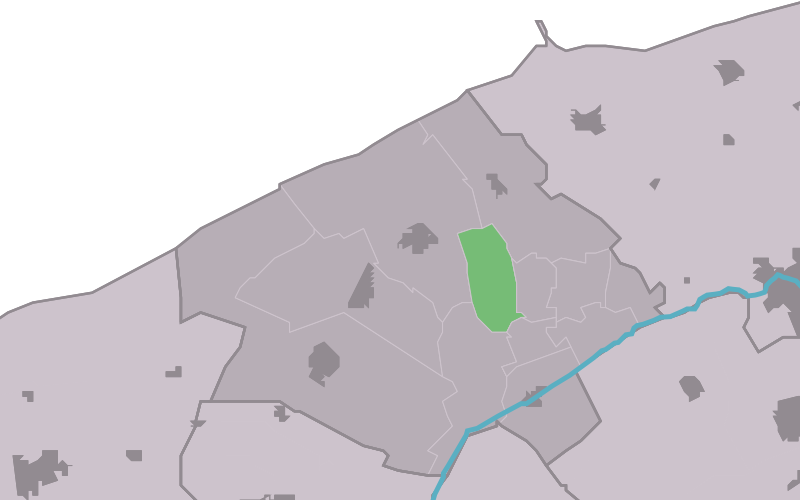
- Location in the former Ferwerderadiel municipality

- Location in the Netherlands Hegebeintum (Netherlands)
- Country: Netherlands
- Province: Friesland
- Municipality: Noardeast-Fryslân

Area
  - Total: 3.89 km^{2} (1.50 sq mi)
- Elevation: 0.5 m (1.6 ft)

Population (2021)
  - Total: 85
  - Density: 22/km^{2} (57/sq mi)
- Time zone: UTC+1 (CET)
  - Summer (DST): UTC+2 (CEST)
- Postal code: 9022
- Dialing code: 0518

Hegebeintum (Dutch: Hogebeintum) is a small village in Noardeast-Fryslân in the province of Friesland, the Netherlands. It had a population of around 90 in January 2017. Before 2019, the village was part of the Ferwerderadiel municipality.

Hegebeintum is home to the highest artificial dwelling hill, or terp, in the Netherlands, measuring around 8.8 metres (29 ft) tall. The high ground of the terp was historically used as a place of refuge during unusually high tides and storm floods, and also had a number of dwellings. There is a well-known restored windmill located south of the village: the Hegebeintumer Mûne.

== History ==
The village was first mentioned between 819 and c. 825 as Bintheim, and means "high settlement with moor grass (Molinia). Hegebeintum is a terp village with a near perfect radial structure. It developed several centuries before Christ. The Dutch Reformed church dates from the 12th century. It was enlarged around 1550. The 13th-century tower was rebuilt in 1717 with yellow bricks.

The polder mill Hegebeintumer Mûne was built in 1860. In 1969, it was decommissioned, because nobody was willing to move to Hegebeintum to operate wind mill, and a pumping station was installed. In 2006, it has been designated as a backup system.

In 1840, Hegebeintum was home to 190 people. Between 1896 and 1905, parts of the terp were excavated which has resulted in a very steep hill. The old terp used to cover 9.5 hectares (23 acres).

== Gallery ==
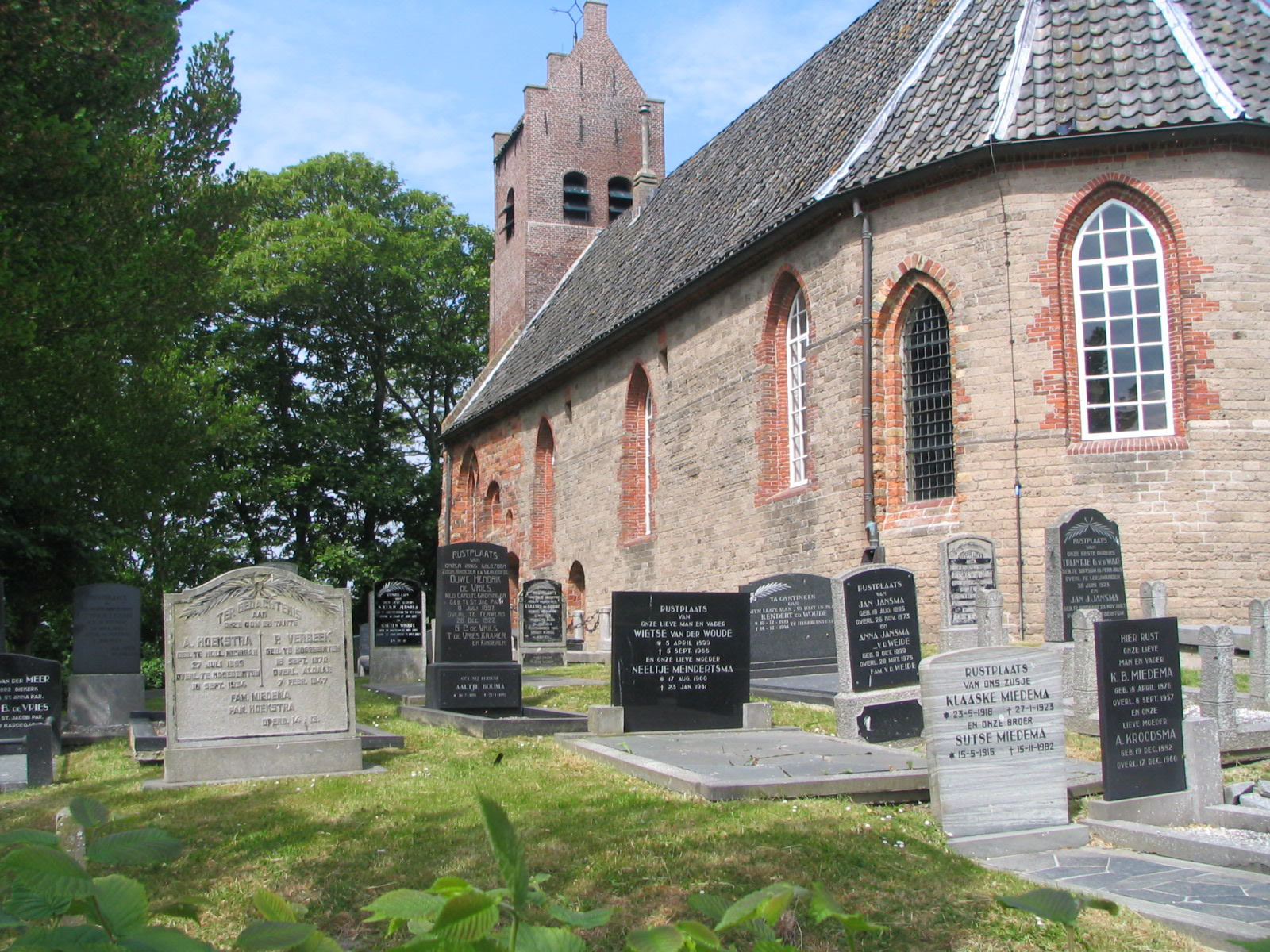
Hegebeintum church

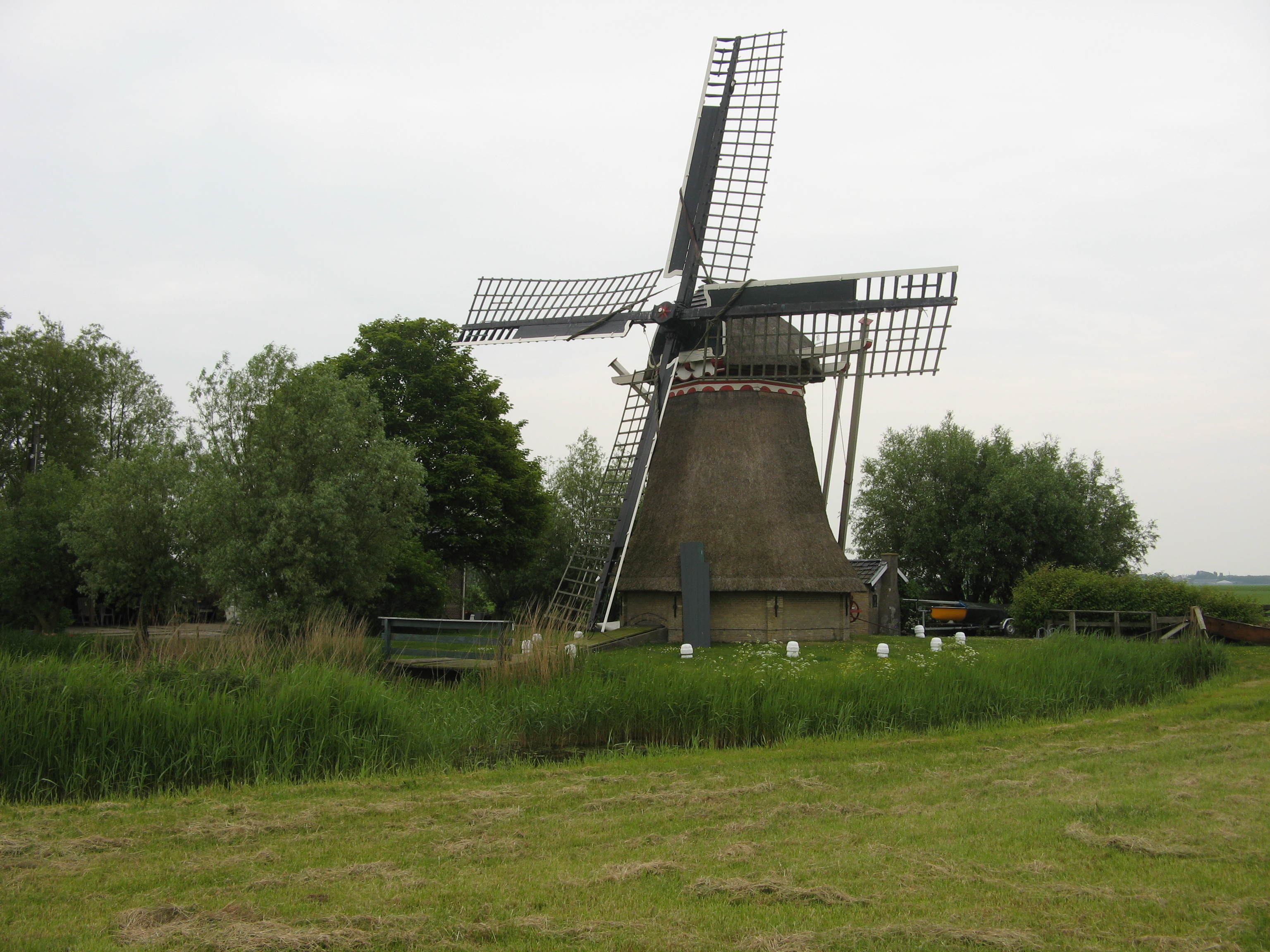
Hegebeintumer Mûne

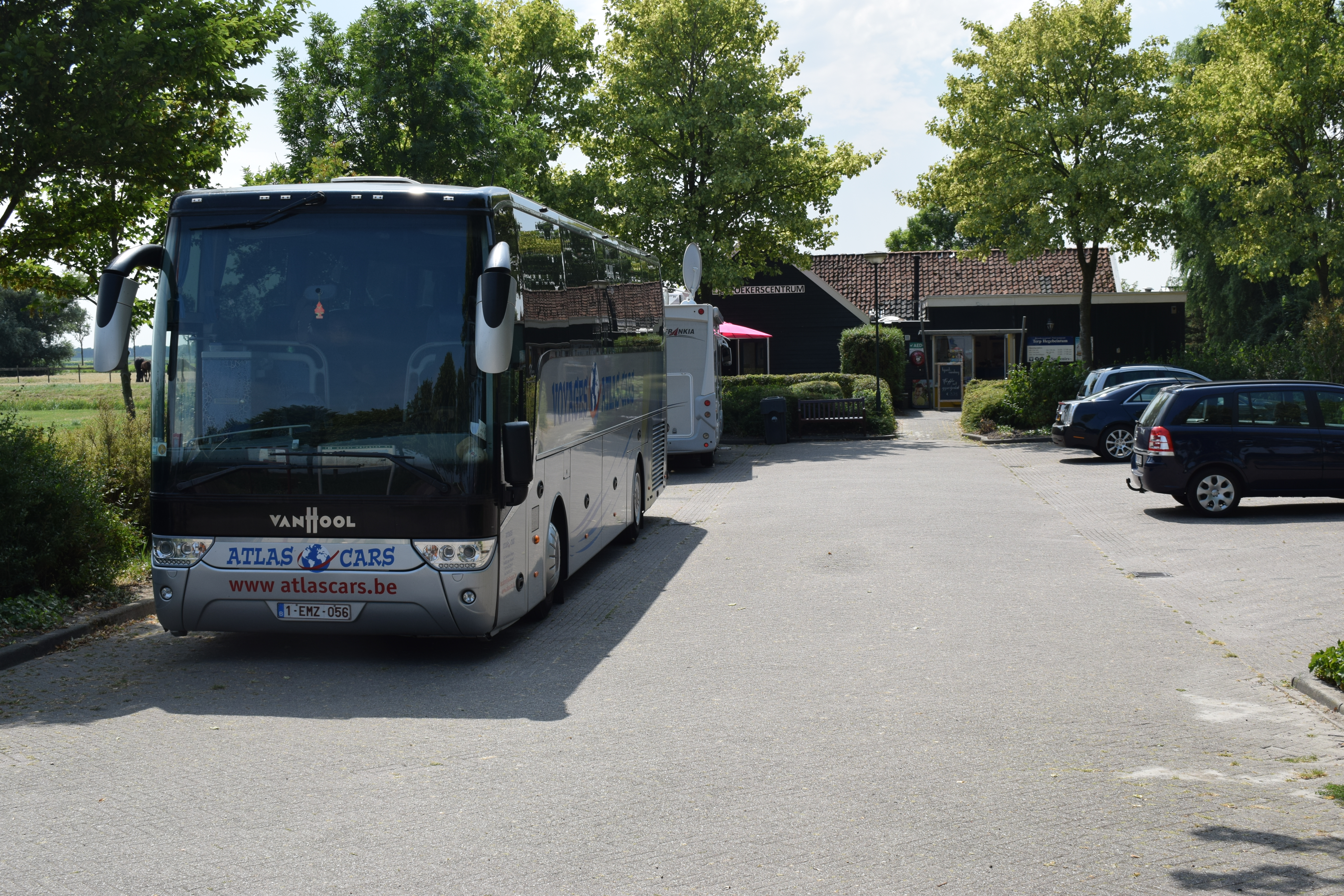
Tour buses in Hegebeintum

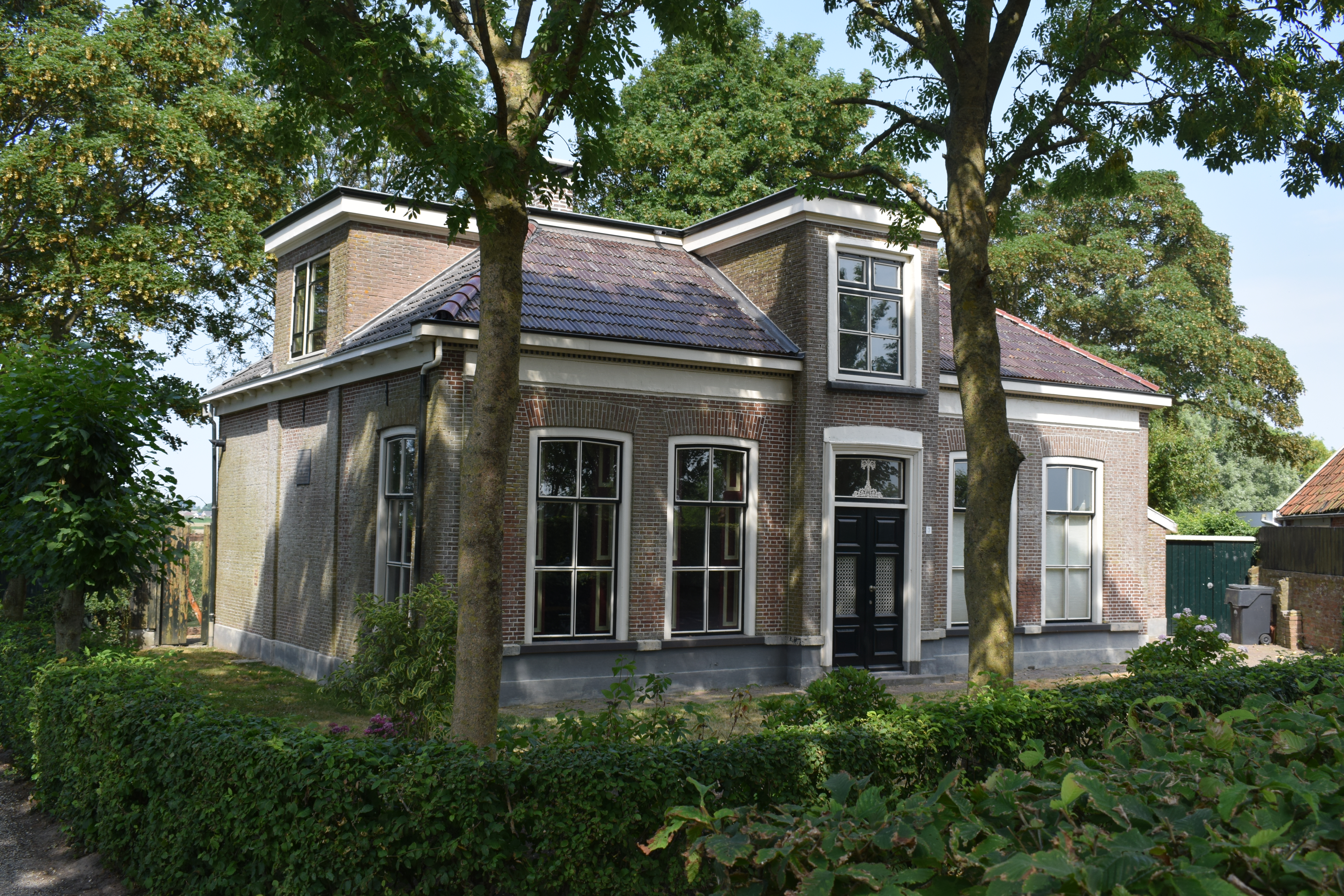
House in Hegebeintum
