= Boazum =

Bozum Boazum
- Village
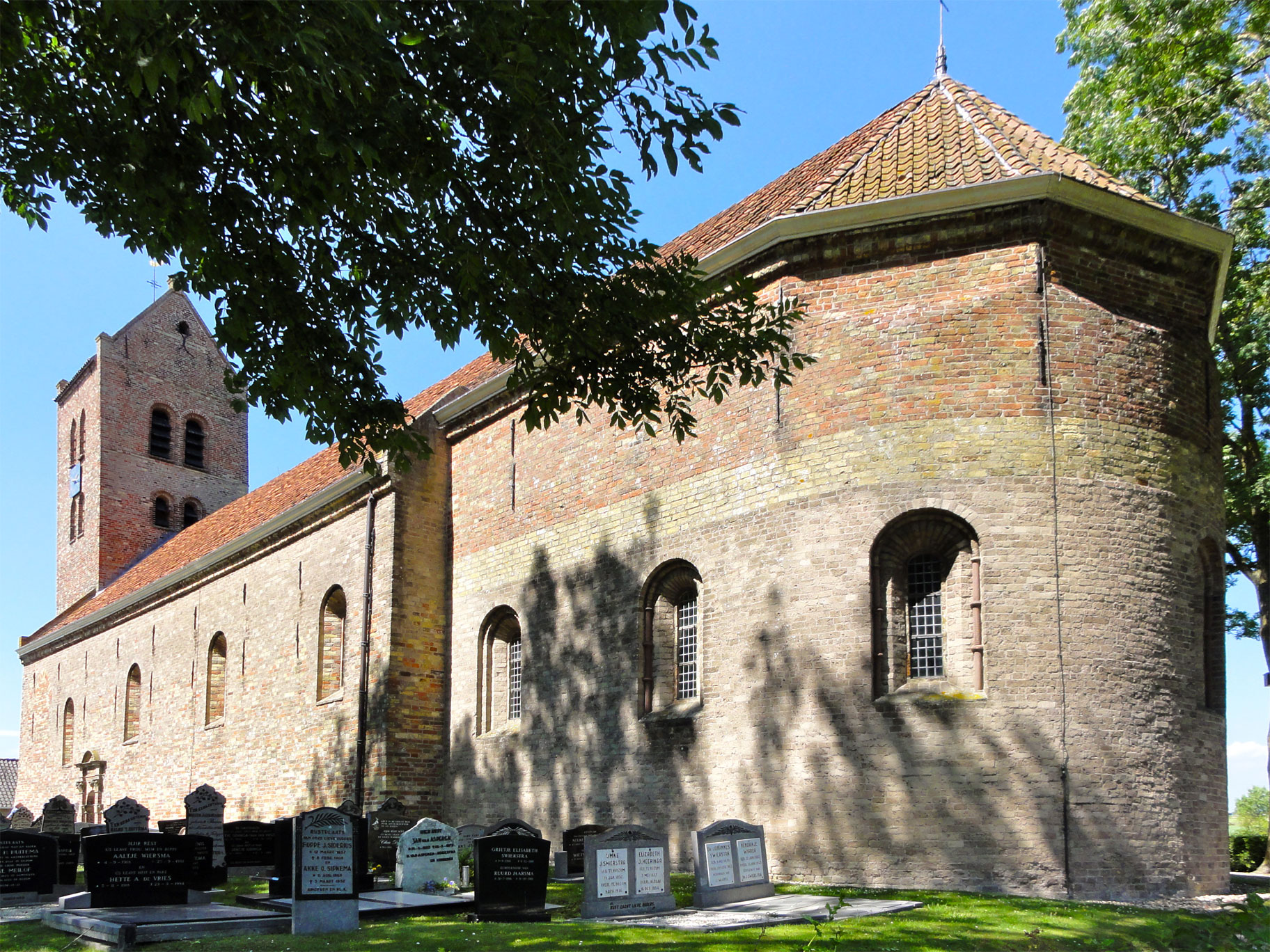
- St Martin's church

- Coat of arms

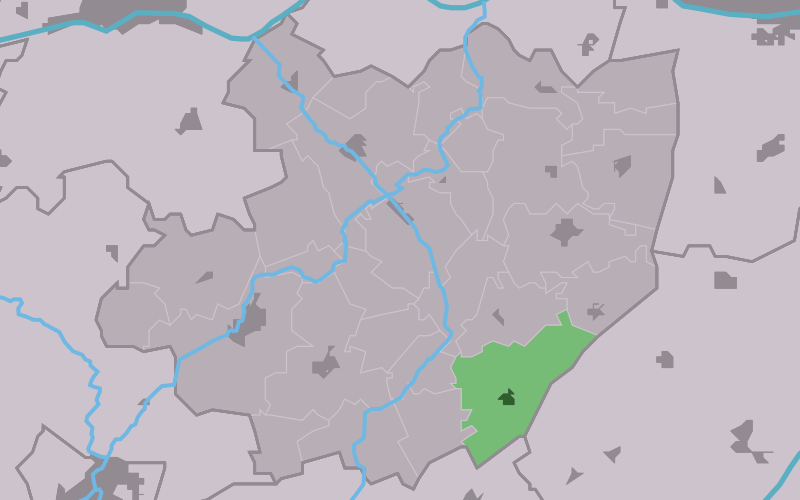
- Location in the former Littenseradiel municipality

- Location in the Netherlands Bozum (Netherlands)
- Country: Netherlands
- Province: Friesland
- Municipality: Súdwest-Fryslân

Area
  - Total: 7.79 km^{2} (3.01 sq mi)
- Elevation: 0.6 m (2.0 ft)

Population (2021)
  - Total: 425
  - Density: 54.6/km^{2} (141/sq mi)
- Time zone: UTC+1 (CET)
  - Summer (DST): UTC+2 (CEST)
- Postal code: 8635
- Dialing code: 0515

Boazum (Dutch: Bozum) is a Frisian village in the municipality of Súdwest-Fryslân, Netherlands with an approximate population of 397 in January 2017. The Boazum church is an example of romanesque twelfth-century architecture and possesses an Ottonian fresco portraying a beardless Christ.

== History ==
The village was first mentioned in 1260 as Bosingum, and "settlement of the people of Bose (person)". Boazum is a terp (artificial living hill) village. It was located on a river leading to the former Middelzee. The stins Walta State was located on the southern part of the terp and was first described in 998. It was demolished in 1839.

The Dutch Reformed church dates from the late-12th century and has a 13th-century tower. It was extensively modified and restored between 1939 and 1948.

Boazum was home to 423 people in 1840. There was a railway station on the Leeuwarden–Sneek railway line between 1883 and 1944. Before 2018, the village was part of the Littenseradiel municipality.

== Notable people ==
A famous Boazumer (although mainly by proxy) was the reverend Eelco Alta (1723-1798), whose treatise Philosophical Considerations concerning the Conjunction of the Planets Jupiter, Mars, Venus, Mercury and the Moon. To be happening on the Eighth of May 1774, and about the Possible and Likely Astronomical and Physical Consequences of this Conjunction from 1774 was long said to have motivated Eise Eisinga to build his famous planetarium. According to the canonicised view, Alta stated that the upcoming conjunction of the planets with the sun would herald the apocalypse, and through his planetarium, Eisinga was able to prove that in fact, the conjunction would not take place. Modern research has however come to the more prosaic conclusion that Eisinga was mainly motivated by practical motives - most of all not having to calculate the orbits and respective positions of the planets and the sun on paper, but instead using his planetarium as a reference.

== Notable buildings ==
- The Protestant church of Boazum

== Gallery ==
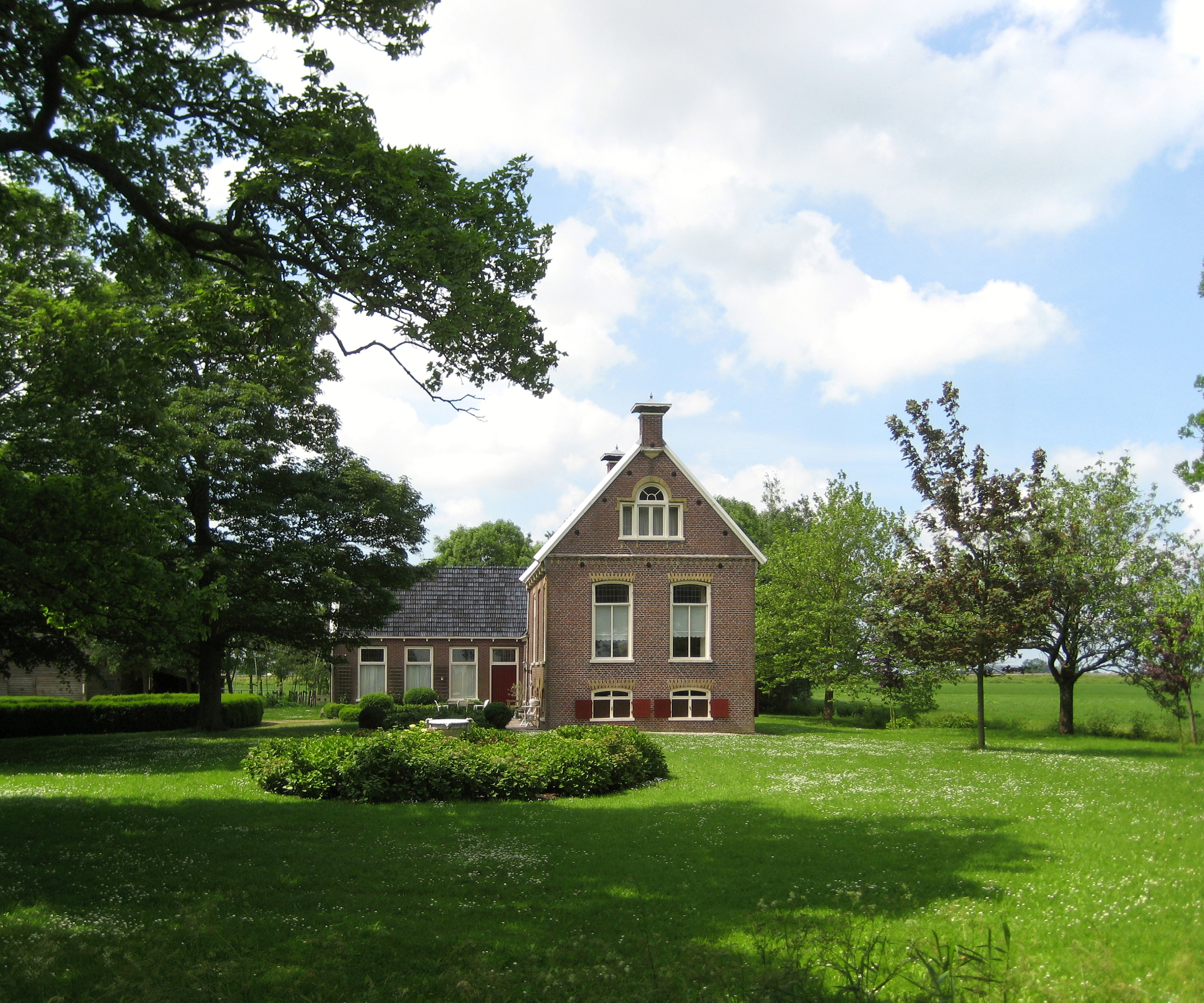
Farm in Boazum

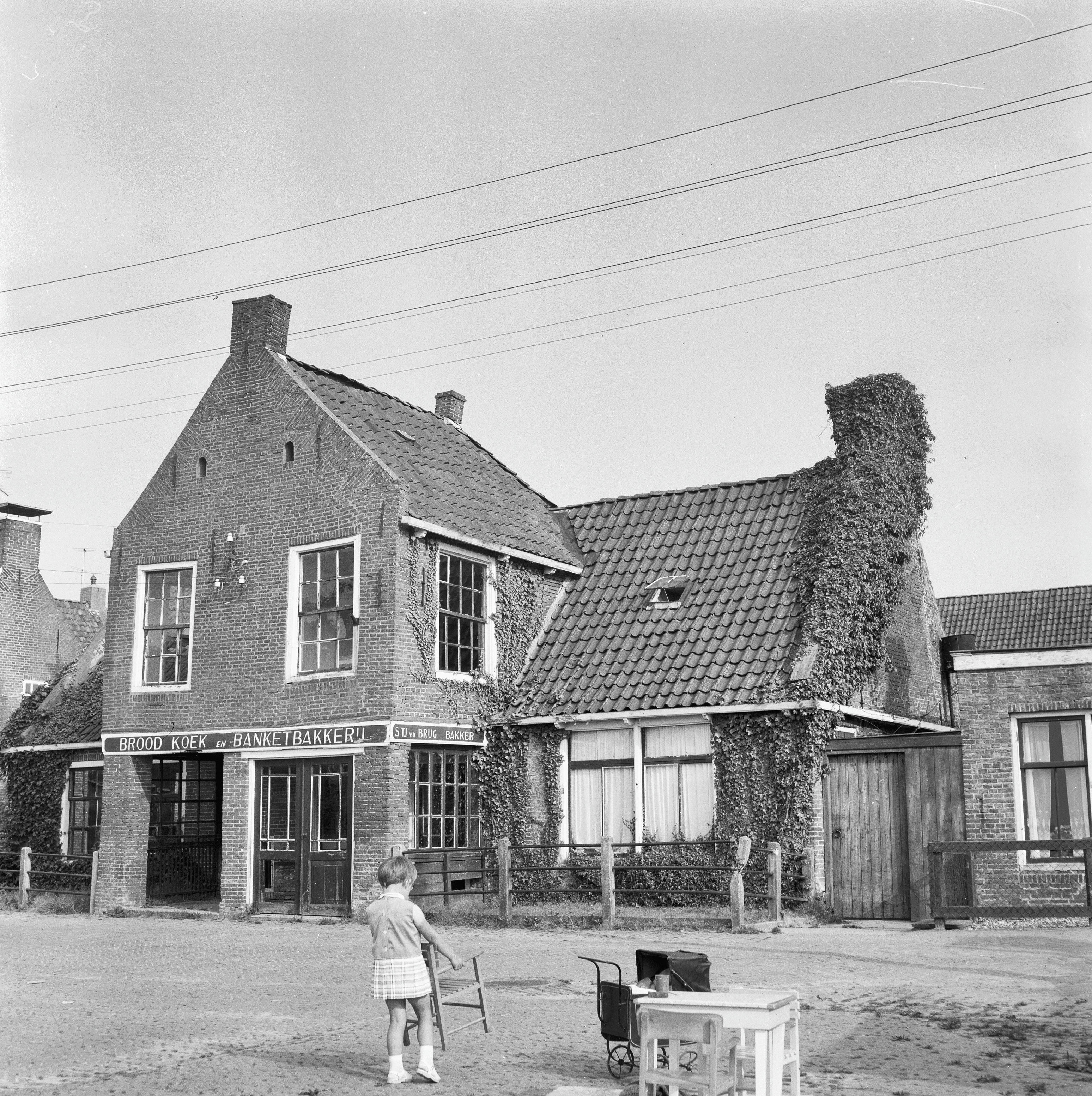
Former bakery (1965)

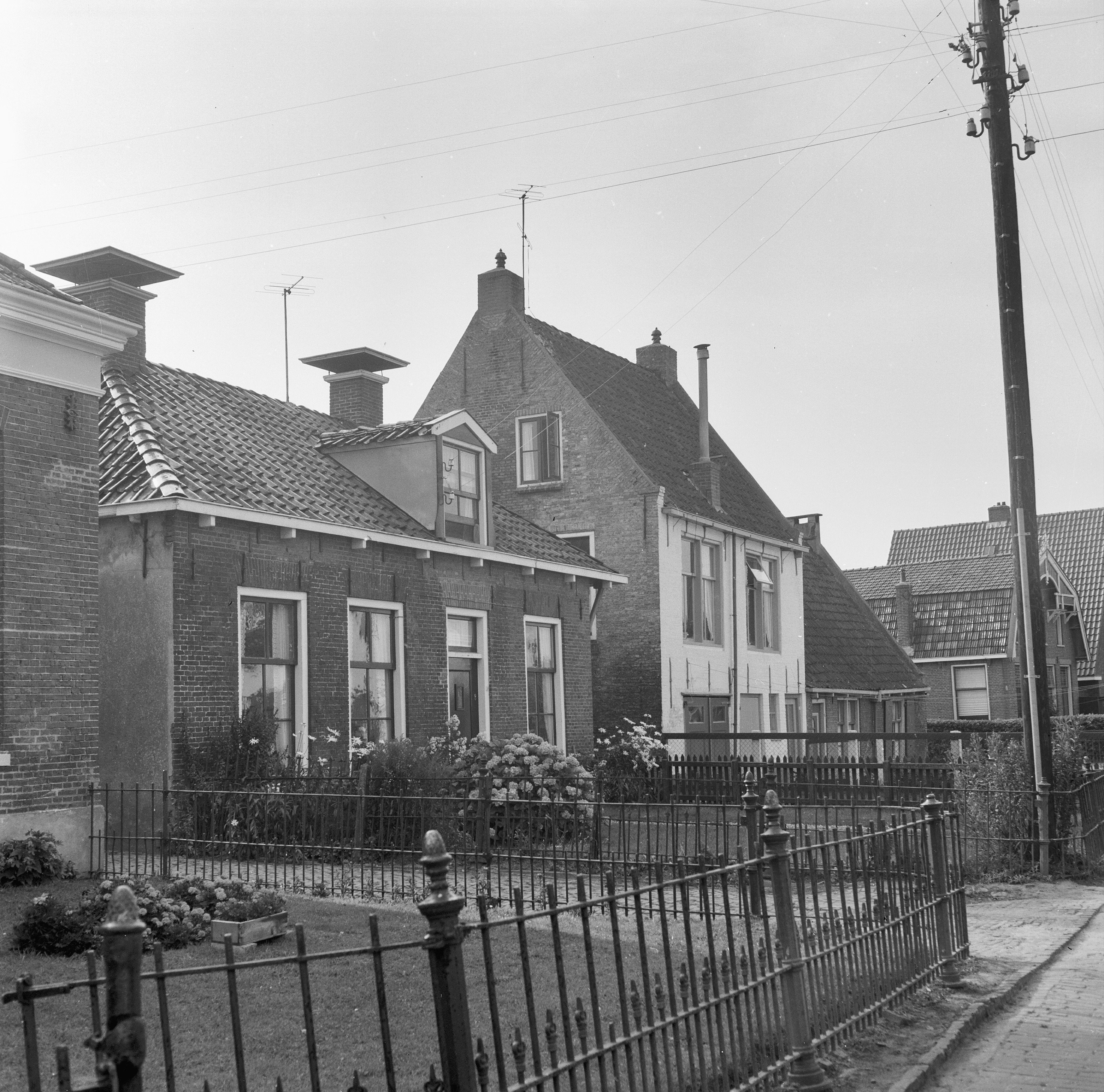
Houses in Boazum (1965)

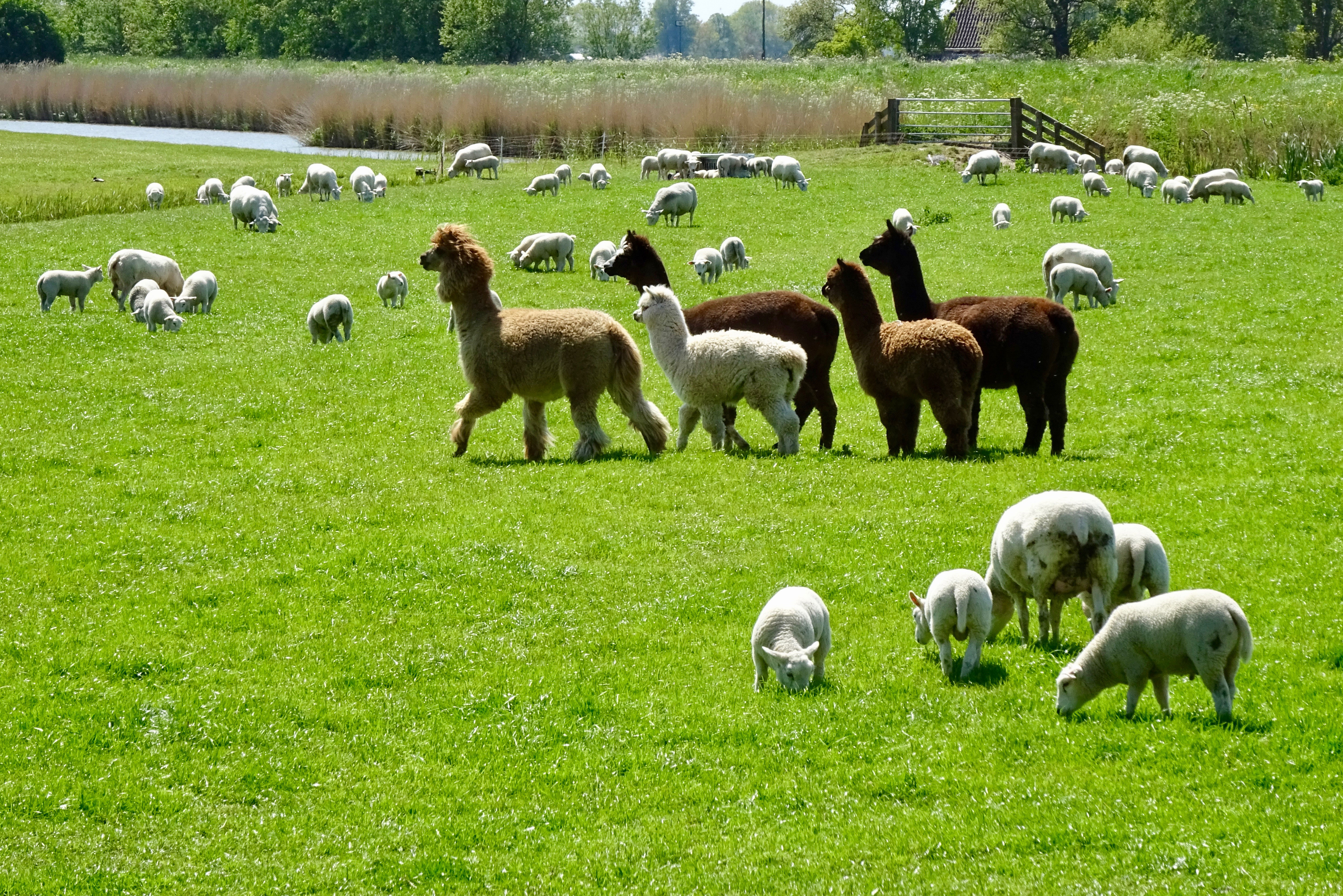
Alpacas and sheep near Boazum
