= Eise Eisinga Planetarium =

18th century planetarium and science museum in Franeker, Friesland, Netherlands

Royal Eise Eisinga Planetarium
- Koninklijk Eise Eisinga Planetarium
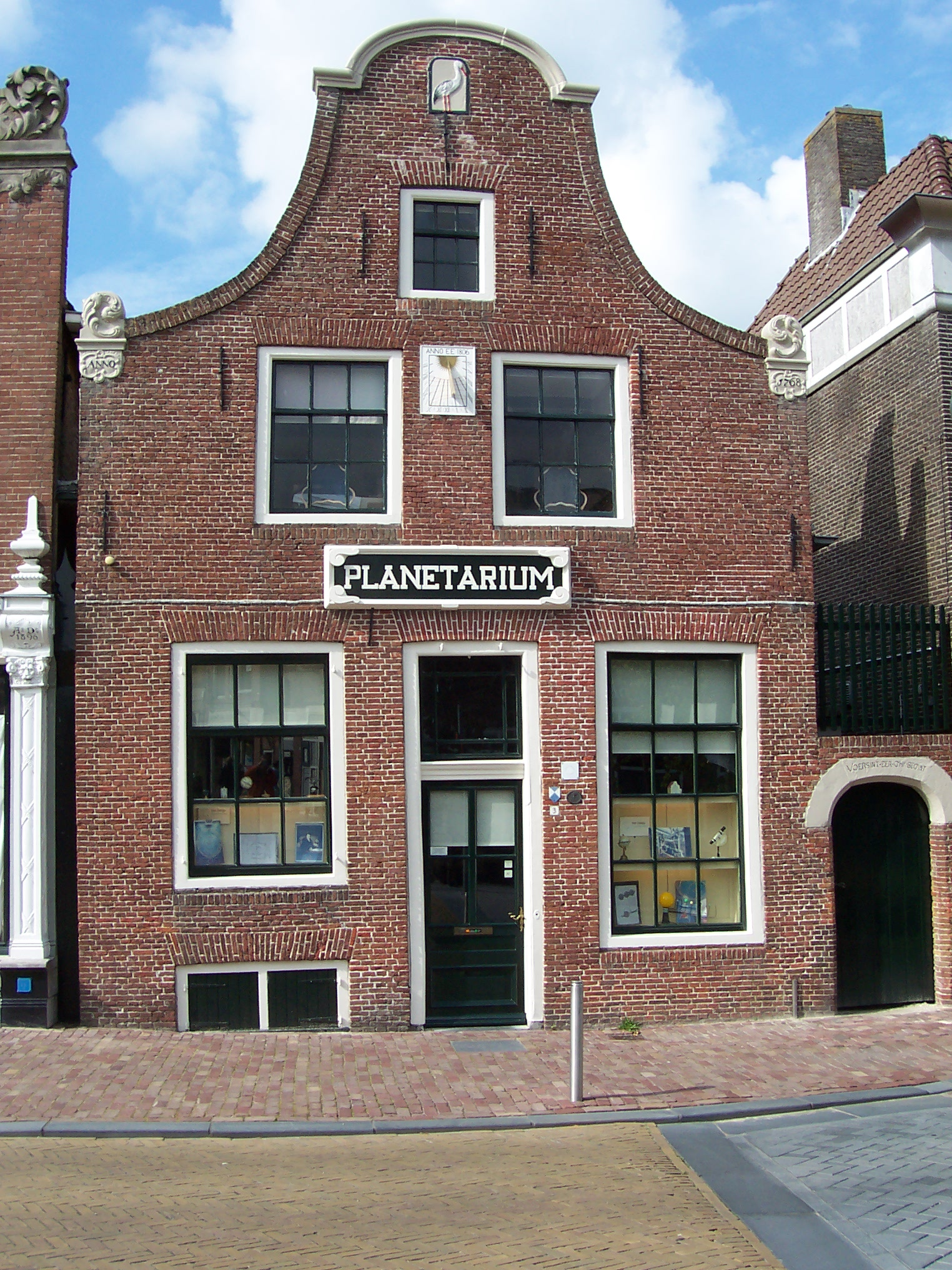
- Front of the museum in 2007
- Established: 1781
- Location: Franeker, Netherlands
- Coordinates: 53.187348°N 5.543965°E
- Type: Science museum
- Website: www.planetarium-friesland.nl

UNESCO World Heritage Site
- Official name: Eisinga Planetarium in Franeker
- Type: Cultural
- Criteria: iv
- Designated: 2023 (45th session)
- Reference no.: 1683
- UNESCO region: Europe

The Royal Eise Eisinga Planetarium (Dutch: Koninklijk Eise Eisinga Planetarium) is an 18th-century orrery in Franeker, Friesland, Netherlands. It is currently a museum and open to the public. The orrery has been on the top 100 Dutch heritage sites list since 1990. In September 2023, it received the status of UNESCO World Heritage Site. It is the oldest working orrery in the world.

== History ==
The orrery was built from 1774 to 1781 by Eise Eisinga, a wool carder and amateur astronomer.

Eise Eisinga’s mechanical planetarium is built into the timber roof of the living room ceiling of his historic canal house. William I, Prince of Orange and the first King of the Netherlands, was so impressed with the planetarium, he purchased the house and it became a royal planetarium.

The museum consists of the planetarium room, a screening room where documentaries are shown, and special exhibits based on modern astronomy. Other parts on permanent display are Eisinga’s former wool combing establishments and a collection of historical astronomical instruments. Those instruments in the collection include Georgian telescopes, 18th century octants and a tellurium, an educational model of the Sun, Earth and Moon.

The museum has a Planetarium Café and Brasserie De Stadstuin located in the former Van Balen coffee-roasting house.

In 2018, the Planetarium celebrated the 250th anniversary of Eisinga’s move to the city of Franeker in 1768, six years before he began work on his Planetarium.

It is listed as a Rijksmonument, number 15668.

The orrery was nominated on 12 December 2011 by the Dutch government for UNESCO World Heritage status, based on its long history as a working planetarium open to the public and its continued efforts to preserve its heritage. In December 2018, it was announced that the Dutch minister of Education, Culture and Science will be sending an application to UNESCO to request a formal nomination of the orrery, bringing heritage status one step closer.

== Orrery ==
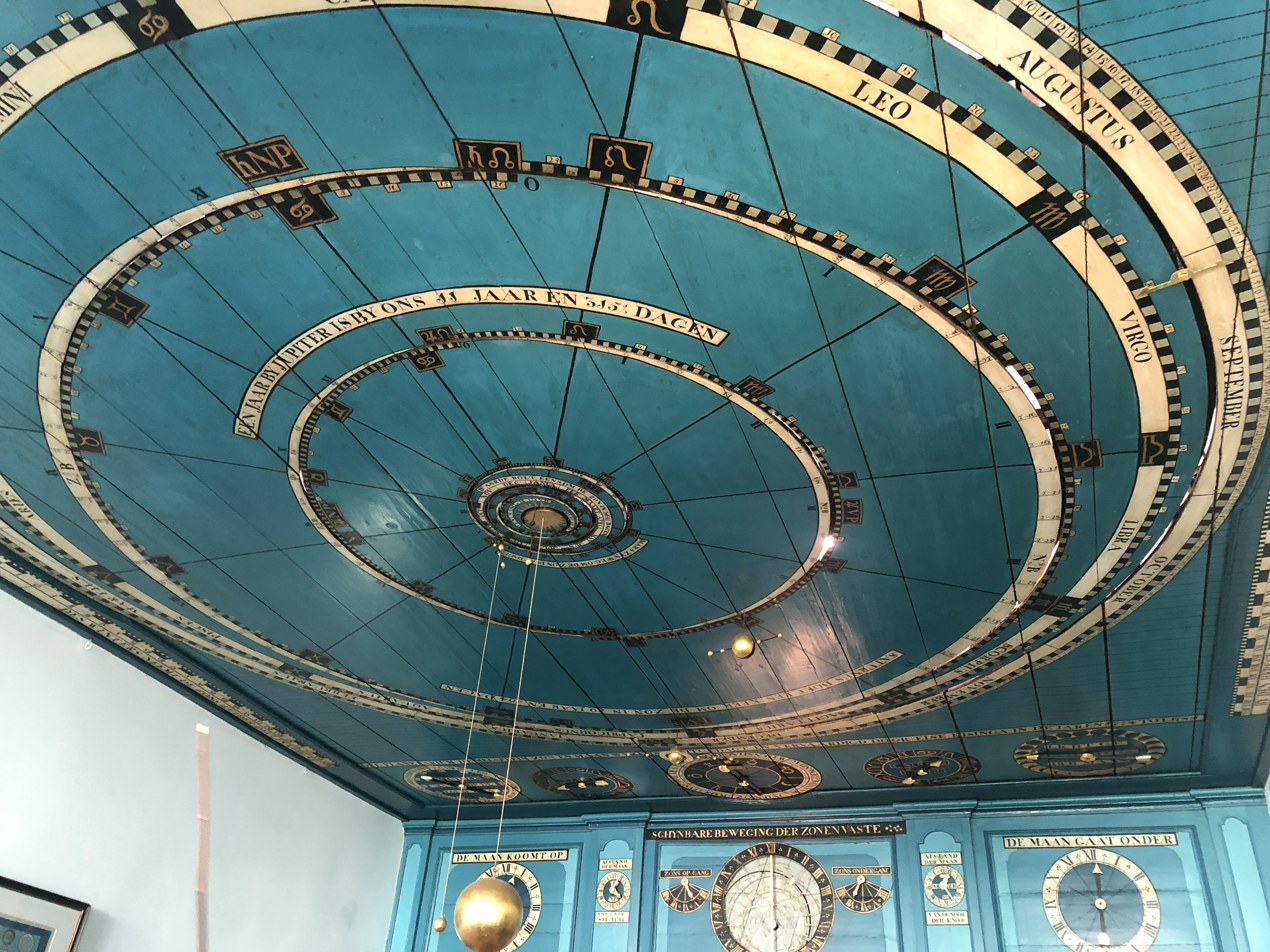
The orrery

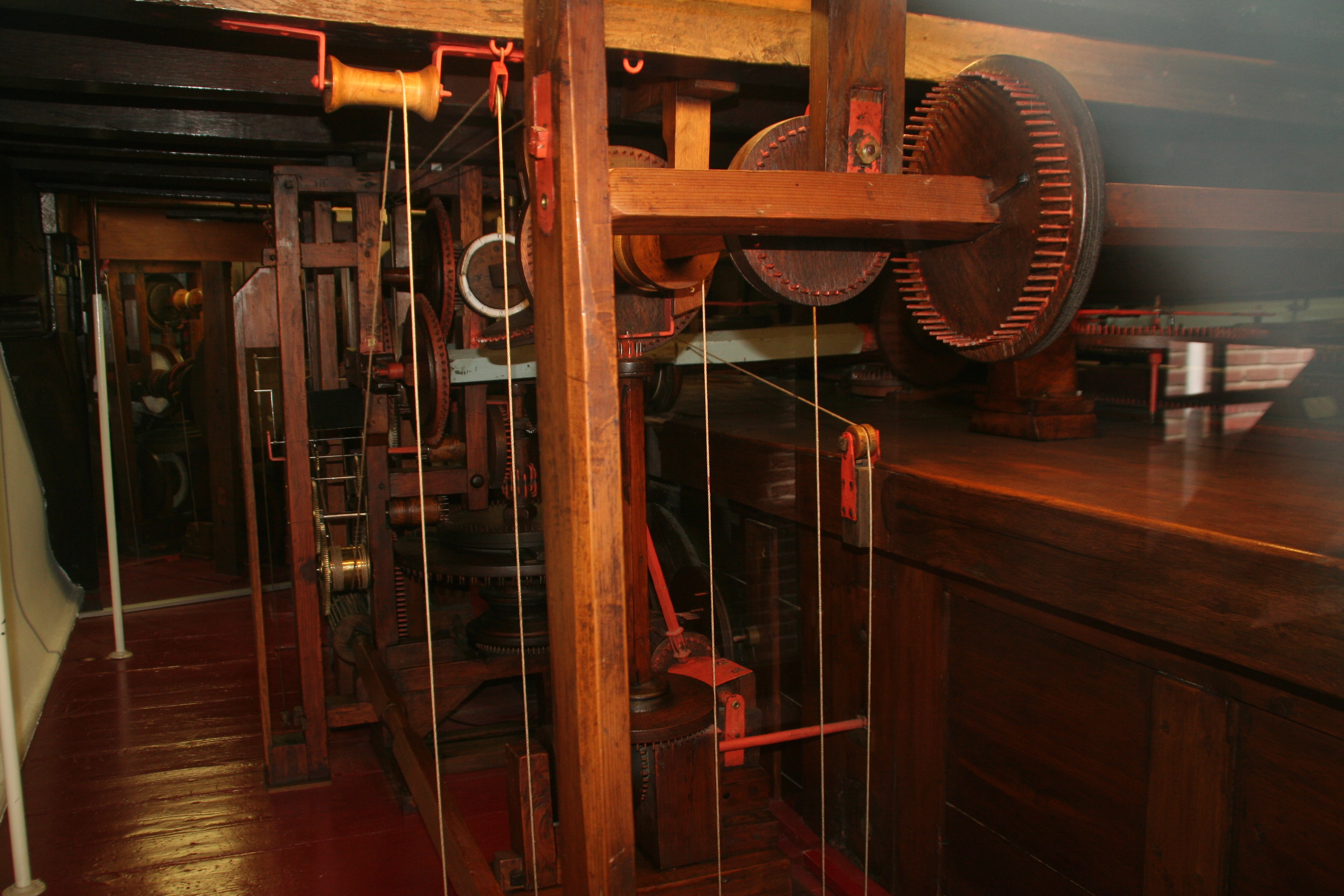
The mechanical works in the space above the ceiling that keep the mechanism in operation

Animation by 3D illustrator Paul Becx with an accelerated rendering of the Eisinga planetarium dials

An orrery is a planetarium, a working model of the Solar System. The orrery contains the Sun, Moon, Mercury, Venus, Earth, Mars, Jupiter and Saturn. The Sun is painted at the center of the ceiling, and the Earth is represented by a golden orb dangling on a wire. It is painted with royal blue glimmer and outlined in shiny gold paint.

The zodiac is also depicted. The clockwork-like mechanical planetarium moves as it does in reality at a reduced scale. The planetarium is very exact, but is not perfect. The pendulum, for instance, is made of a single type of metal so it is influenced by temperature fluctuations.

The "face" of the model looks down from the ceiling of what used to be his living room, with most of the mechanical works in the space above the ceiling. It is driven by a pendulum clock, which has 9 weights or ponds. The planets move around the model in real time, automatically. (A slight "re-setting" must be done by hand every four years to compensate for the February 29th of a leap year.) The planetarium includes a display for the current time and date. The plank that has the year numbers written on it has to be replaced every 22 years.

The Eise Eisinga Planetarium is the oldest still working planetarium in the world.

To create the gears for the model, 10,000 handmade nails were used. In addition to the basic orrery, there are displays of the phase of the moon and other astronomical phenomena.

The orrery was constructed to a scale of 1:1,000,000,000,000 (1 millimetre: 1 million kilometres).
