= Halbertsma =

Halbertsma family, history and genealogy

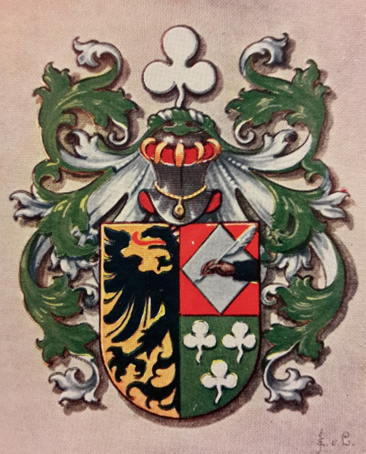
- Country: The Netherlands
- Founder: Buwe Hiddes (ca. 1570-1620) Hed Halbetsma (ca. 1500-1555)
- Current head: Tjalling Halbertsma

Halbertsma is a Frisian patrician family that originates from Dokkum's surrounding area. Family members traditionally occupy positions in the legal field, academia, medicine, business, and public administration.

The family is mostly known for its significant contributions to Frisian literature and written language. Other members operated successful timber and dairy businesses in, respectively, Grou and Sneek, which offered a main source of employment for the region in the 19th and 20th century.

The cultural heritage of the family is, as of 1934, governed by the Halbertsma Foundation. The present chairman is prof.dr. Tjalling Halbertsma, dean of Campus Fryslân, University of Groningen. The family is listed in volumes 5, 12, 15, 40 and 71 of the genealogical reference work Nederland's Patriciaat (hereafter NP).

== Contributions to Frisian culture, literature and language ==
The Brothers Halbertsma played a crucial role in the development of Frisian literature, written language and culture in the first half of the 19th century. Their collected literary work, Rimen & Teltsjes, is regarded as the national book of Western Frisian literature.

Minister Joost Halbertsma, Dr.h.c., the eldest of the Halbertsma brothers, researched and wrote on Frisian (linguistic) history extensively. His Lexicon Frisicum served as the outline for the first Frisian dictionary. As part of his literary and scientific research he maintained a vast network and lively correspondence with prominent Dutch literary figures, such as Willem Bilderdijk and Jacob van Lennep, and with European greats, like the Danish linguist Rasmus Rask, the English poet Robert Southey, and the German linguist and fairytale-collector Jacob Grimm. Moreover, he was invited to join learned historical and linguistic societies in Leiden, Copenhagen, Berlin, Athens en Halle-Wittenberg. Joost's commitment to preserving and developing the Frisian identity led to his inclusion in the so-called Canon of Friesland. Also, the highest award for historical and scientific work related to Fryslân, the Dr Joast Halbertsmapriis, is named after him. He ultimately donated his extensive collection of cultural-historical objects to the province of Friesland, which served as the basis for the present-day Fries Museum.

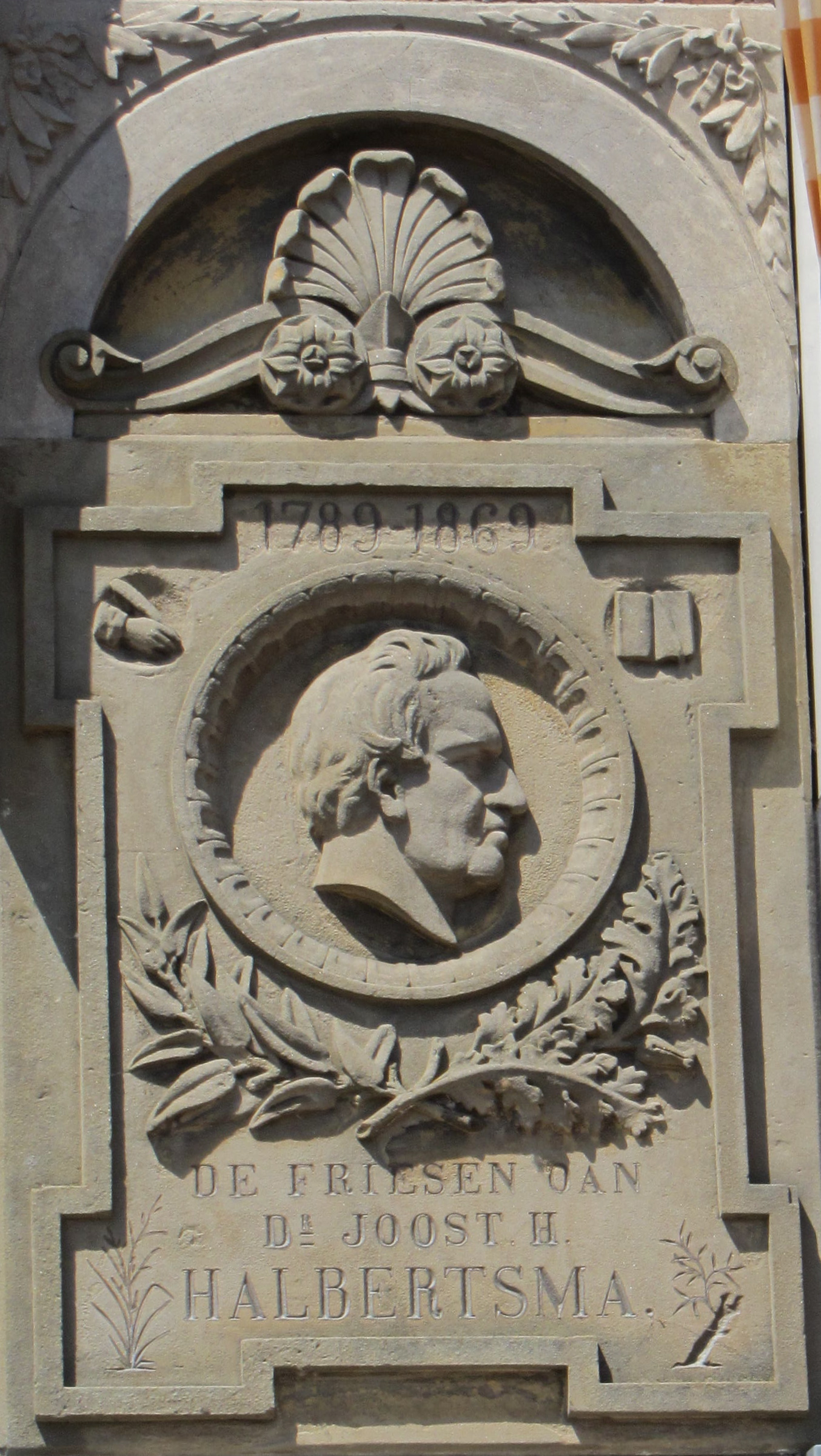
Halbertsmahûs, Grou.

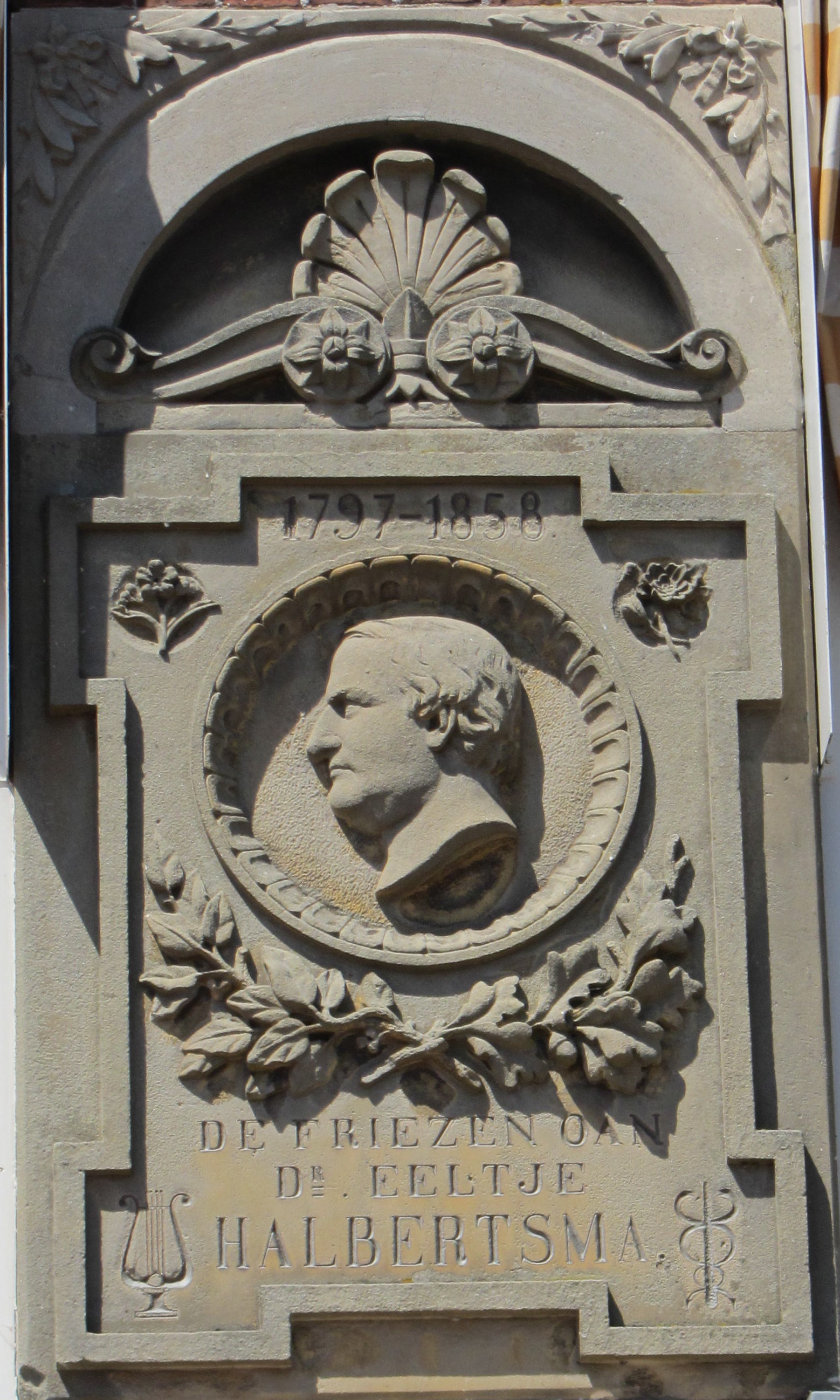

The third brother, Dr. med. Eeltje Halbertsma's, was a notable romantic poet alongside his work as general practitioner. His most famous poem, De Alde Friezen, is established as the Frisian anthem.

The second brother, Tjalling Halbertsma, was a writer, international dairy merchant, and member of the Provincial Council of Friesland. His descendants established the successful dairy wholesale business 'Normandia' in Sneek. As the city's dignitaries they mostly based themselves on the Kleinzand; in these monumental buildings Johannes Halbertsma (1888-1958) and Herre Halbertsma (1920-1998) founded the Fries Scheepvaart Museum.

The fourth brother, Binnert Halbertsma, was active in the timber trade. His descendants played an important role in the timber industry, with the 'Halbertsma's Fabrieken voor Houtbewerking'. During the 19th and 20th century the company served as a main source of employment for the inhabitants of Grou and its surrounding area. In Grou, on the birthplace of the Halbertsma brothers, Binnert build the house now known as the 'Halbertsmahûs' (Halbertsma House). Memorial busts of Dr.med. Eeltje and minister Joost were added to its facade in the 1880s.

== History ==
The proven family lineage is traced back to the landowner and textile merchant Buwe Hiddes (c. 1570-1625) from Ee, Fryslân. His son, Hidde Buwes (c. 1610-1666), also became a successful textile merchant and landowner. He settled in Kollum.

In 1634 Hidde Buwes' married Wytske Sipckes Halbetsma (1614-c.1665). Their son, Dr. Scipio Halbetsma (1644-1700), in accordance with established Frisian custom, adopted his mother's surname. He obtained a doctorate in both laws at the University of Franeker, was an attorney before the Court of Frisia and substitute secretary of Westdongeradeel. Scipio's great-grandson, Dr. med. Theodorus Halbetsma (1741-1779), also obtained a doctorate at the University of Franeker and was a member of the vroedschap and mayor of Dokkum. The 'r' in the family name was added during his generation.

=== The Halbetsma family of Kollum ===
Wytske Halbetsma (1614-1665) descended from the landowning Halbetsma family based in Kollum. Its lineage can be traced back to co-judge Hed Halbetsma (ca.1500-after 1556). Hed's grandson, Scipio (Sipke) Halbetsma († before 1622) became secretary of Westdongeradeel, and was the father of Wytske Sipckes Halbetsma and mayoresse Antje Sipckes Halbetsma (1611-1666). The family inhabited the Halbetsma State, the Halbetsma house and the Halbetsmazate.

== Genealogy ==
This section provides a partial genealogy of the Halbertsma family.

=== Earliest generations ===
- Buwe Hiddes (ca. 1570-1625) textile merchant and owner of land and houses in Ee, Tibma, Anjum and Engwierum.
  - Hidde Buwes (1610-1666) textile merchant and owner of land and houses in Ee, Engwierum, Oldwolde, Augustinusga, Kollumerpomp and Kollum. Married Wytske Sypckes Halbetsma (1614-ca. 1665), great-granddaughter of judge Hed Halbetsma (ca. 1500-after 1552).
    - Dr. Scipio Halbetsma (1644-1700), doctor of both laws at the University of Franeker, attorney at the Court of Friesland, deputy-secretary of Westdongeradeel, procurator fiscal in Dokkum and elder in Ternaard. He married Catharina Rinia Stinstra, daughter of Joost Rinia, member of the vroedschap and mayor of Dokkum.
      - Theodorus Halbertsma (1679-1742), deputy-secretary of Westdongeradeel.
        - Minister Scipio Halbetsma (1709-1779), pastor in Arum and Holwerd.
          - Dr. med. Theodorus Halbetsma (1741-1779), obtained a doctorate in medicine at the University of Franeker, physician, member of the vroedschap and mayor of Dokkum. Married in 1764 to Dieuke Visscher (c. 1740-1803), daughter of Dr. Frans Canter Visscher, council in vroedschap Deventer, and granddaughter of Jacobus Canter Visscher.
            - Mr. Cornelis Halbetsma (1768-1833), secretary of Ferwerderadeel and attorney in Leiden. He married Johanna Jacoba de Joncheere, whose family is listed in NP 5, 39 en 41.

=== Brothers Halbertsma and descendants ===
==== Joost Halbertsma and his descendants ====
- Joost Hiddes Halbertsma (1789-1869), Mennonite minister in Bolsward and in Deventer, man of letters, known for the first Frisian dictionary 'Lexicon Frisicum' and the literary work Rimen & Teltsjes. He obtained an honorary doctorate in letters from Leiden University and was appointed Knight in the Order of the Dutch Lion (hereafter KDL). He was married to Johanna Iskjen Hoekema (1794-1847).
  - Dr. Petrus Halbertsma (1817-1852), rector Instituut van Kinsbergen (Latin School) at Elburg.
  - Prof. Dr. Hidde Halbertsma (1820-1865), professor of Anatomy and Physiology at Leiden University, chancellor at Leiden University (1864-1865). Married Jacoba Sophia Hamaker (1827-1888), whose family is listed in NP 8.
  - Prof. Dr. Tjalling Justus Halbertsma (1829-1894), professor of Greek language and literature at the University of Groningen (1877-1894). Married to Hendrika Catharina Merens (1844-1899), her family is listed in NP 6 and 55.

==== Tjalling Halbertsma and his descendants ====
- Tjalling Halbertsma (1792-1852), member of the Provincial Council of Friesland, writer, man of letters and international dairy merchant.
  - Dr. Klaas Halbertsma (1815-1879), physician in Sneek.
    - Prof. Dr. Tjalling Halbertsma KDL (1841-1898), professor of obstetrics and gynaecology at the University of Groningen (1866) and at the Utrecht University (1867-1883). He married Johanna Helena Elizabeth van der Mandere (1849-1886) in 1883, whose old Flemish family is listed in NP 7.
      - Mr. Steven Nicolaas Boudewijn Halbertsma KDL (1884-1965) vice-president of the Hague Court of Appeal, member of the Special Council of Cassation. Married to Jkvr. Jenny Louise Quarles van Ufford.
        - Mr. Stephanus Justus Halbertsma (1920-1991), C.E.O. of the Dutch Insurance Association and agent of the Nederlandsche Bank. Married to Jkvr. Eveline Margaretha Lucia van Suchtelen van de Haare (1923-2011).
    - Dr. Stephanus Justus Halbertsma (1844-1925), Officer in the Order of Orange-Nassau (hereafter OON), medical director of the Krankzinnigengesticht in Rotterdam (1880-1890), member of the municipal council and alderman of Rotterdam. Married to Theodora Jacoba van Vollenhoven, whose family is listed in NP 15, 16 and 53.
    - Ing. Hidde Petrus Nicolaas Halbertsma (1853-1929), engineer, architect and director of municipal water, gas and electricity facilities in Wiesbaden, member of Utrecht city council.
      - Prof. Dr. Ing. Nicolaas Adolf Halbertsma OON (1889-1966), physicist, honorary senator of the Technische Hochschule in Karlsruhe, head of the technical propaganda department of Philips' Gloeilampenfabrieken in Eindhoven, professor of lighting technology in Utrecht. Married to Jacoba Hermina Blom, whose family is listed in NP 9 and 15.
        - Mr Hylke Gerald Halbertsma OON (1918-2008), economist, president and director of several bodies within the United Nations.
  - Johannes Halbertsma (1827-1884), merchant in the dairy industry, founder and co-owner of the firm Johannes Halbertsma, member of the town council and chairman of the Chamber of Commerce in Sneek. He married Hylkia Kingma (1826-1875) in 1850, whose family is listed in NP 87. He remarried in 1877 to Maria Franscina Huijsman (1829-1914), whose family is listed in NP 4, 58 and 90.
    - Tjalling Halbertsma (1853-1906), composer, assistant resident in Yogyakarta and resident of Banjoemas.
    - Hylke Halbertsma (1857-1932), dairy wholesaler, co-founder and director of the firm Johannes Halbertsma and of the factory La Normandie in Sneek. Married to Maria Francisca Margaretha Helena Strootman, whose family is listed in NP 9.
      - Johannes Halbertsma (1888-1958), director N.V. Johannes Halbertsma's Zuivelindustrie, co-founder and chairman of the Friesch Scheepvaart Museum in Sneek.
      - Hylke Halbertsma (1895-1972), co-owner of the firm Tiedeman & Van Kerchem and the firm van Heekeren & Co in Batavia, musician. Married to Sara van Lennep, sister of resistance heroine Mies Boissevain-van Lennep, and scion of the Van Lennep family.
        - Niels Friso Halbertsma (1929), former chief curator Tropenmuseum in Amsterdam, director World Wildlife Fund Netherlands, filmmaker and recipient of the Golden Ark.
          - Prof.dr.mr. Tjalling Hidde Friso Halbertsma (1969), lawyer, anthropologist, author and dean of Campus Fryslân, University of Groningen.
    - Herrius Halbertsma (1864-1920), merchant, international trader, co-founder and member firm La Normandie, later director of Johannes Halbertsma's Dairy Industry.
      - Johannes Herrius Halbertsma (1894-1979), regent Old Burger Weeshuis, director of dairy factory N.V. Normandia in Sneek.
        - Dr. Herrius (Herre) Halbertsma OON (1920-1998), archaeologist, publicist, deputy director Rijksdienst Oudheidkundig Bodemonderzoek, curator of the Oudheidkamer in Bolsward, founder and curator of Friesch Scheepvaart Museum in Sneek and recipient of the Dr. Joast Halbertsmapriis.
          - Dr. Maria Elisabeth (Marlite) Halbertsma KDL (1947), professor of Historical Aspects of Art and Culture at Erasmus University Rotterdam (until 2012), and recipient of the Ad Fontes medal and the Wolfert van Borselen medal.
          - Drs. Ruurd Binnert Halbertsma (1958), associate professor of archaeology at Leiden University (2010-2018), curator at the Rijksmuseum van Oudheden in Leiden and author.

==== Binnert Halbertsma and his descendants ====
- Binnert Hiddes Halbertsma (1795-1847), merchant, member Provincial Chamber of Commerce Friesland.
  - Hidde Binnerts Halbertsma (1830-1895), international timber merchant, member firm H. Halbertsma Bzn, and founder of a steam factory for boxes and tub wood in Grou.
    - Pieter Goslik Halbertsma (1860-1925), C.E.O. of N.V. Halbertsma's Fabrieken voor Houtbewerking, member of the municipal council of Idaarderadeel and member of the Provincial Council of Friesland.
      - Hidde Binnert Halbertsma OON (1888-1971), C.E.O. of N.V. Halbertsma's Fabrieken.

==== Eeltje Halbertsma and his descendants ====
- Dr.med. Eeltje Halbertsma (1797-1858), physician, man of letters, poet and author, (a.o. of the Frisian national anthem, De Alde Friezen).
  - Dr. Hidde Halbertsma (1830-1869), physician in Grou.
    - Dr. Eeltje Halbertsma OON (1857-1935), physician, major-general, chief of medicine of the Army Service.

== Gallery ==
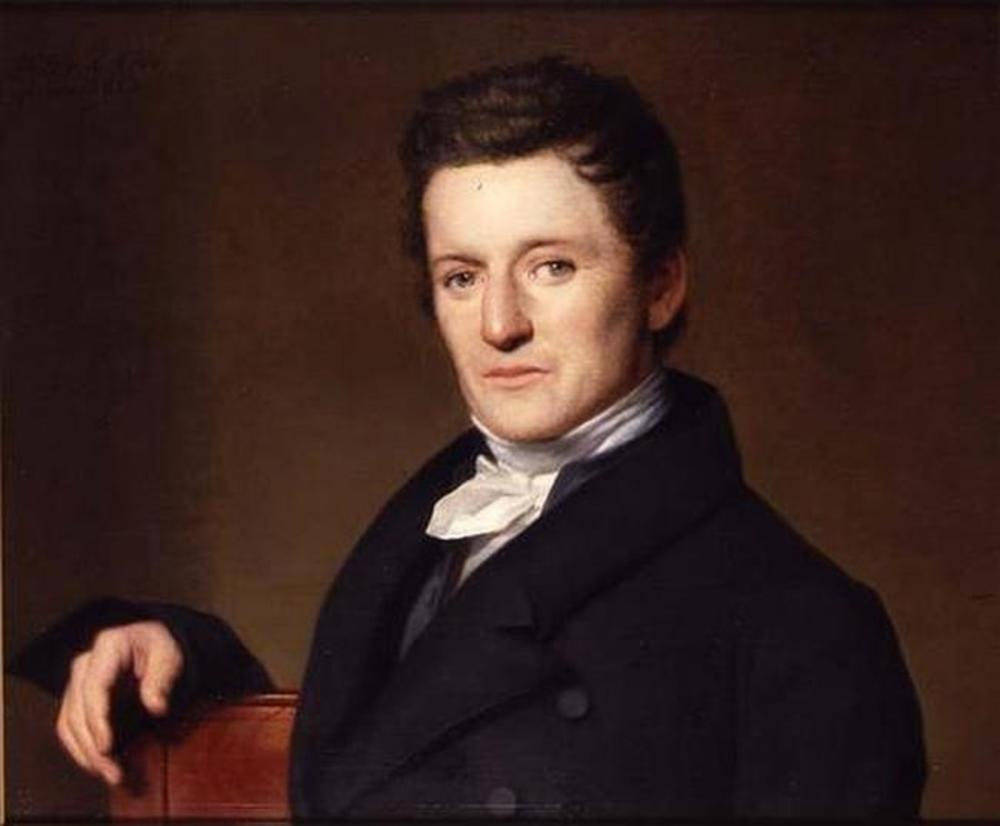
Minister Joost Hiddes Halbertsma (1789-1869).

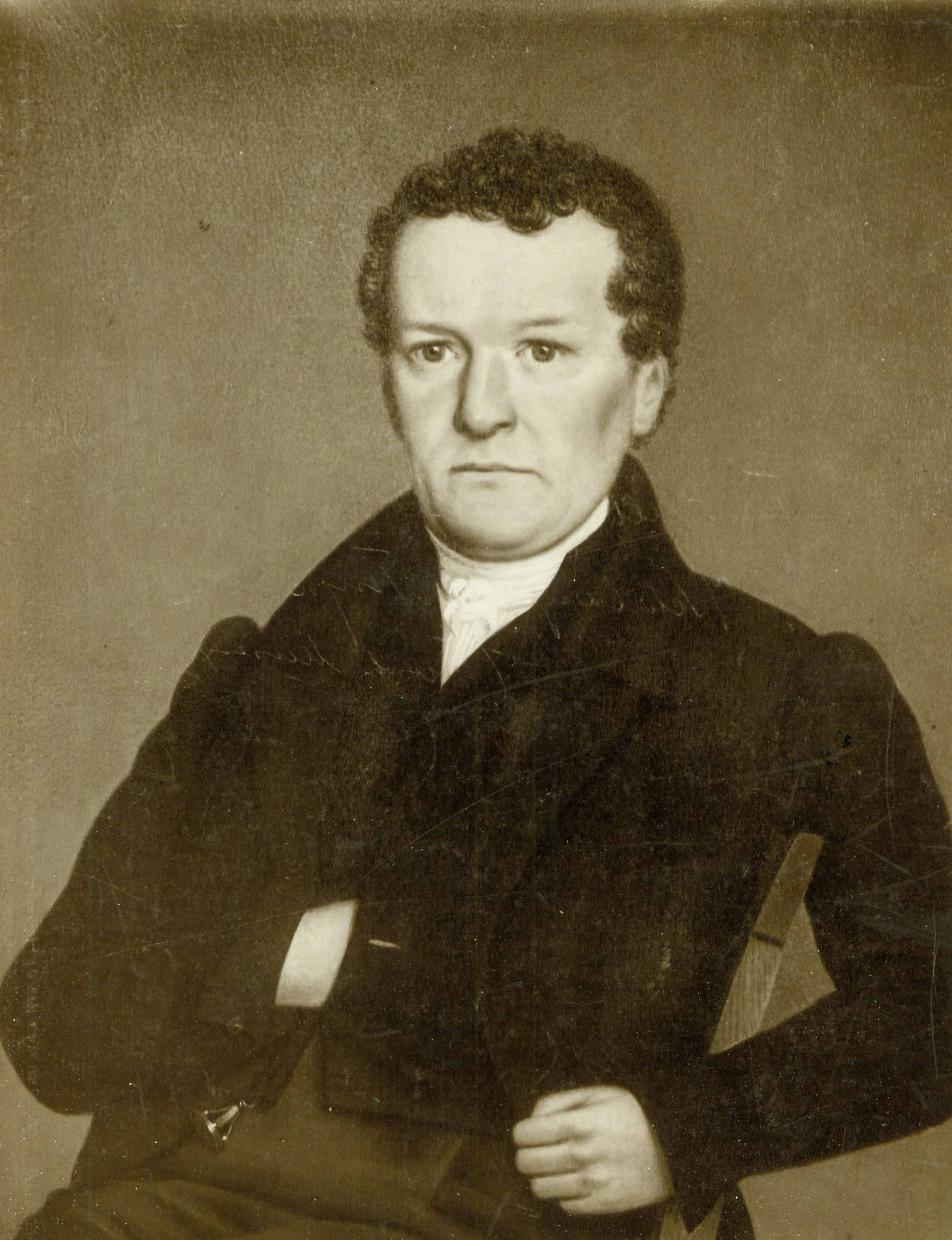
Tjalling Hiddes Halbertsma (1792-1852).

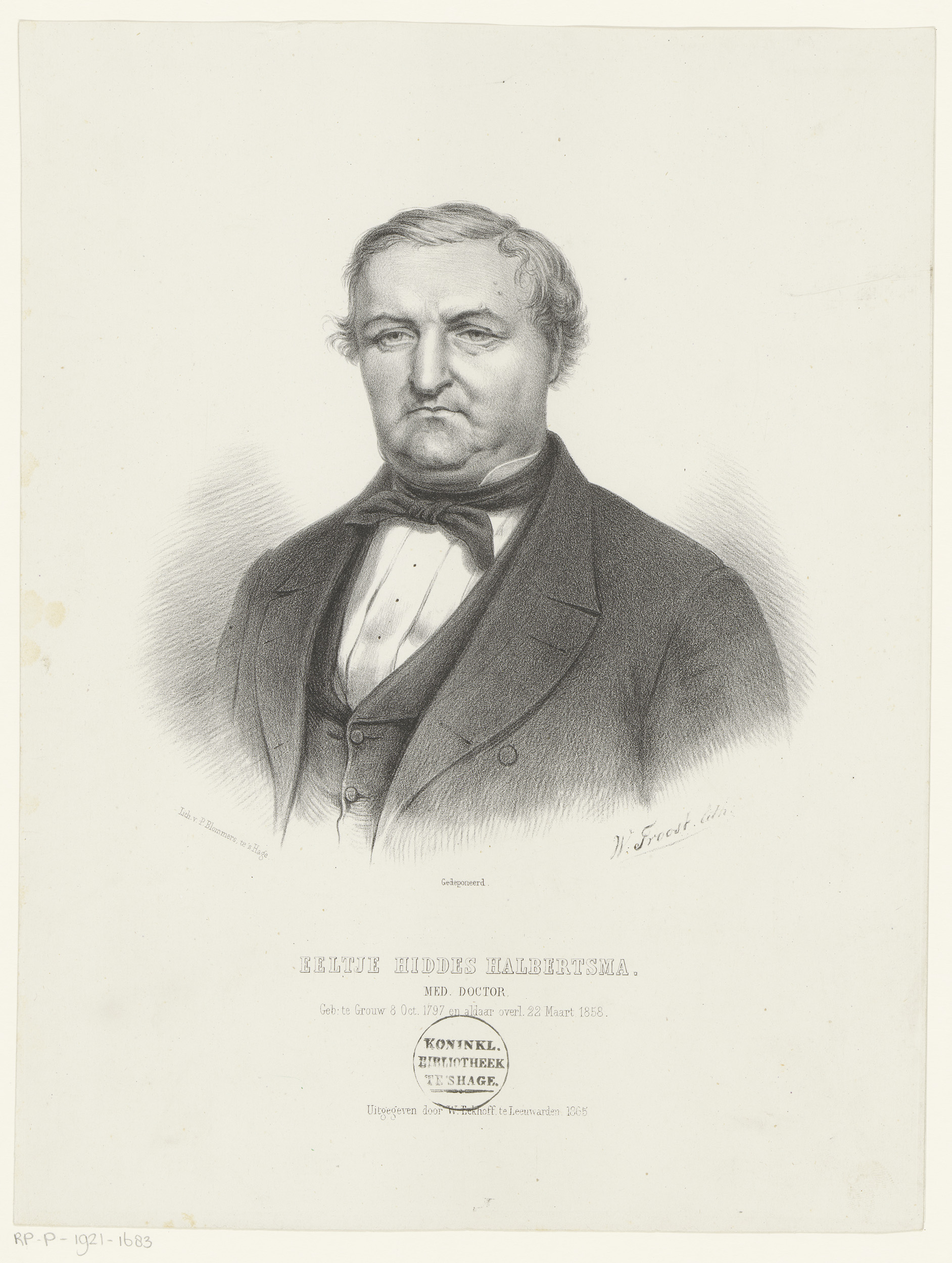
Dr. med. Eeltje Hiddes Halbertsma (1797-1858).

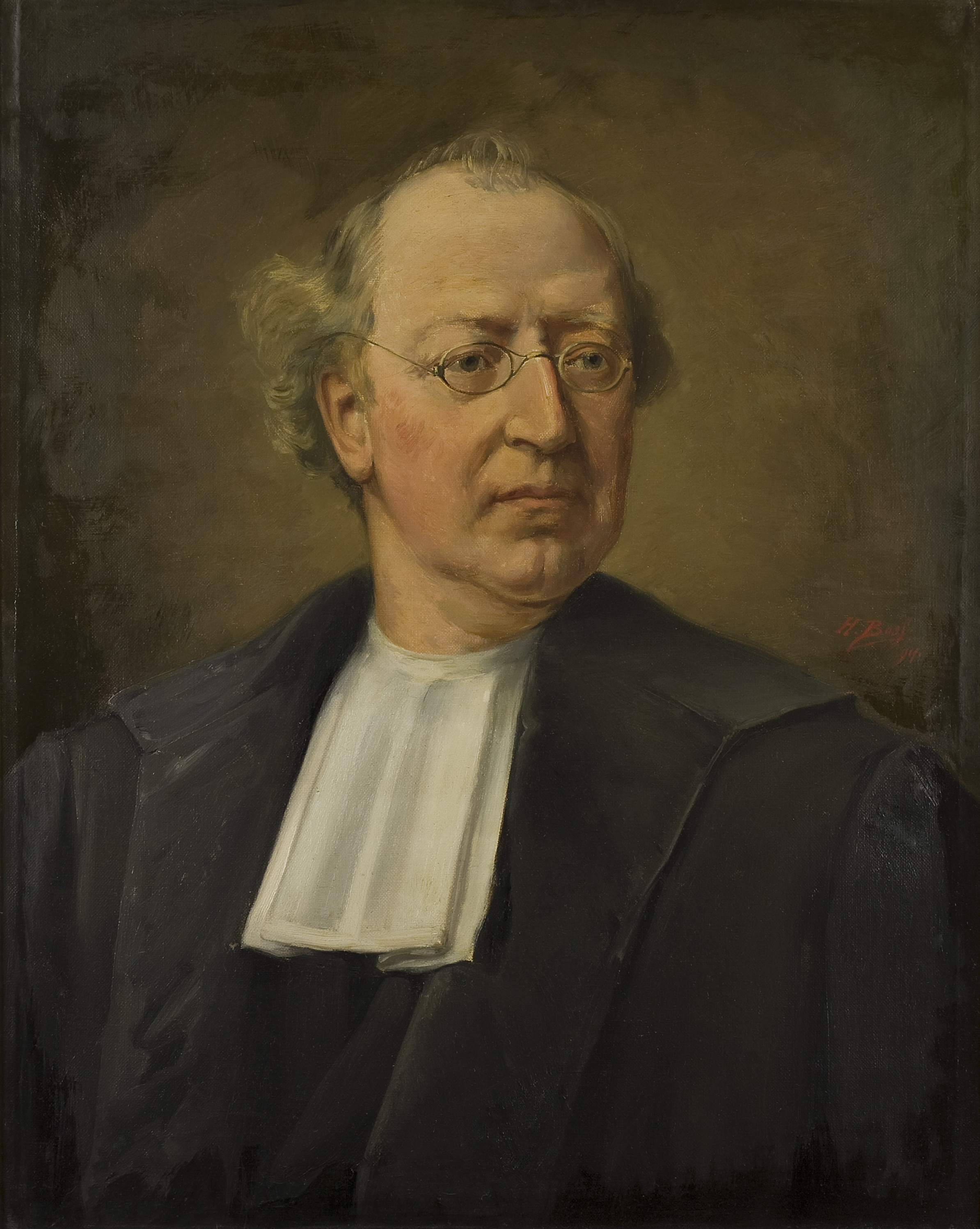
Prof. dr. Tjalling Justus Halbertsma (1829-1894)

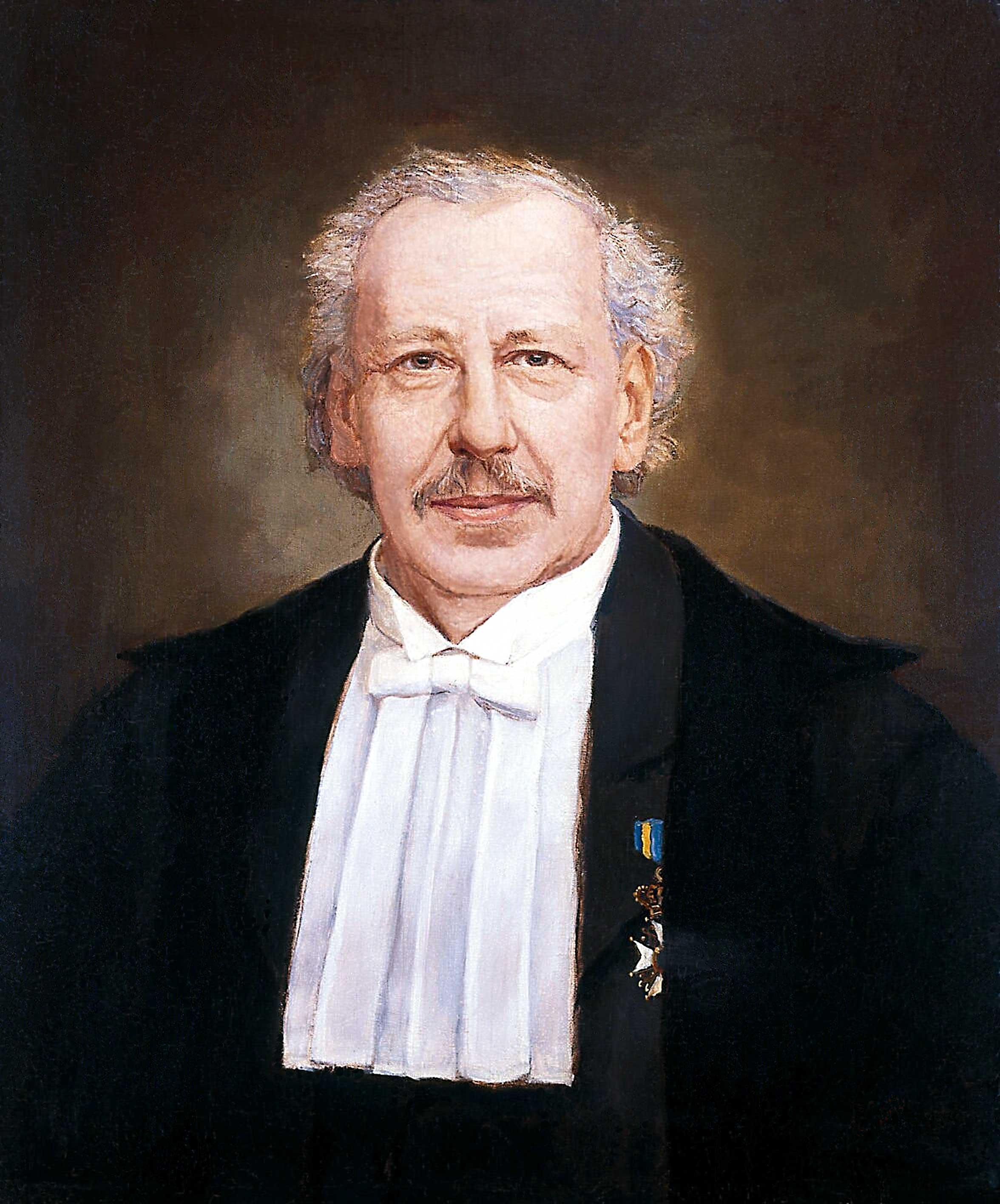
Prof. dr. Tjalling Halbertsma (1841-1898).

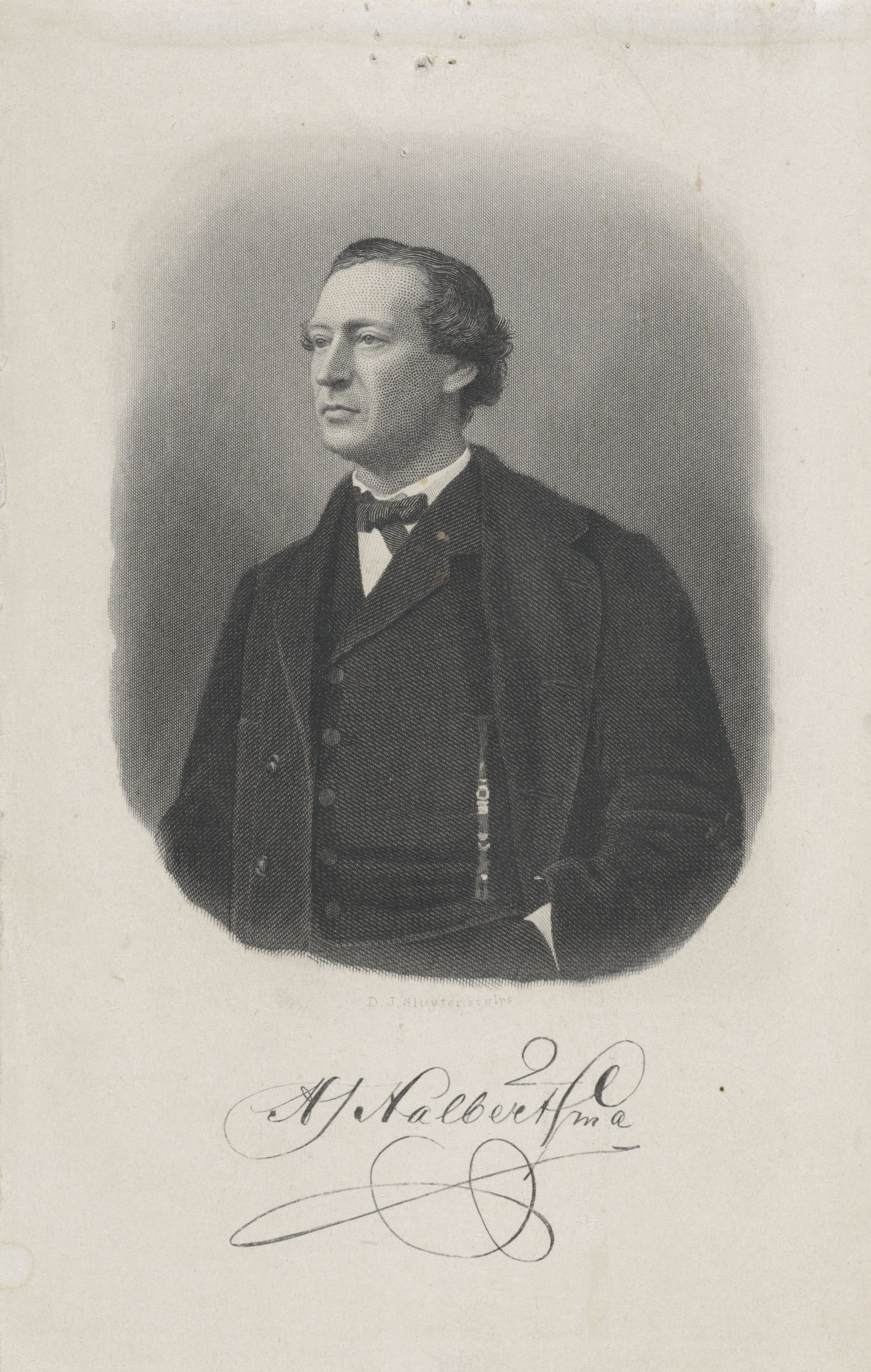
Prof. dr. Hidde Justusz. Halbertsma (1820-1865).

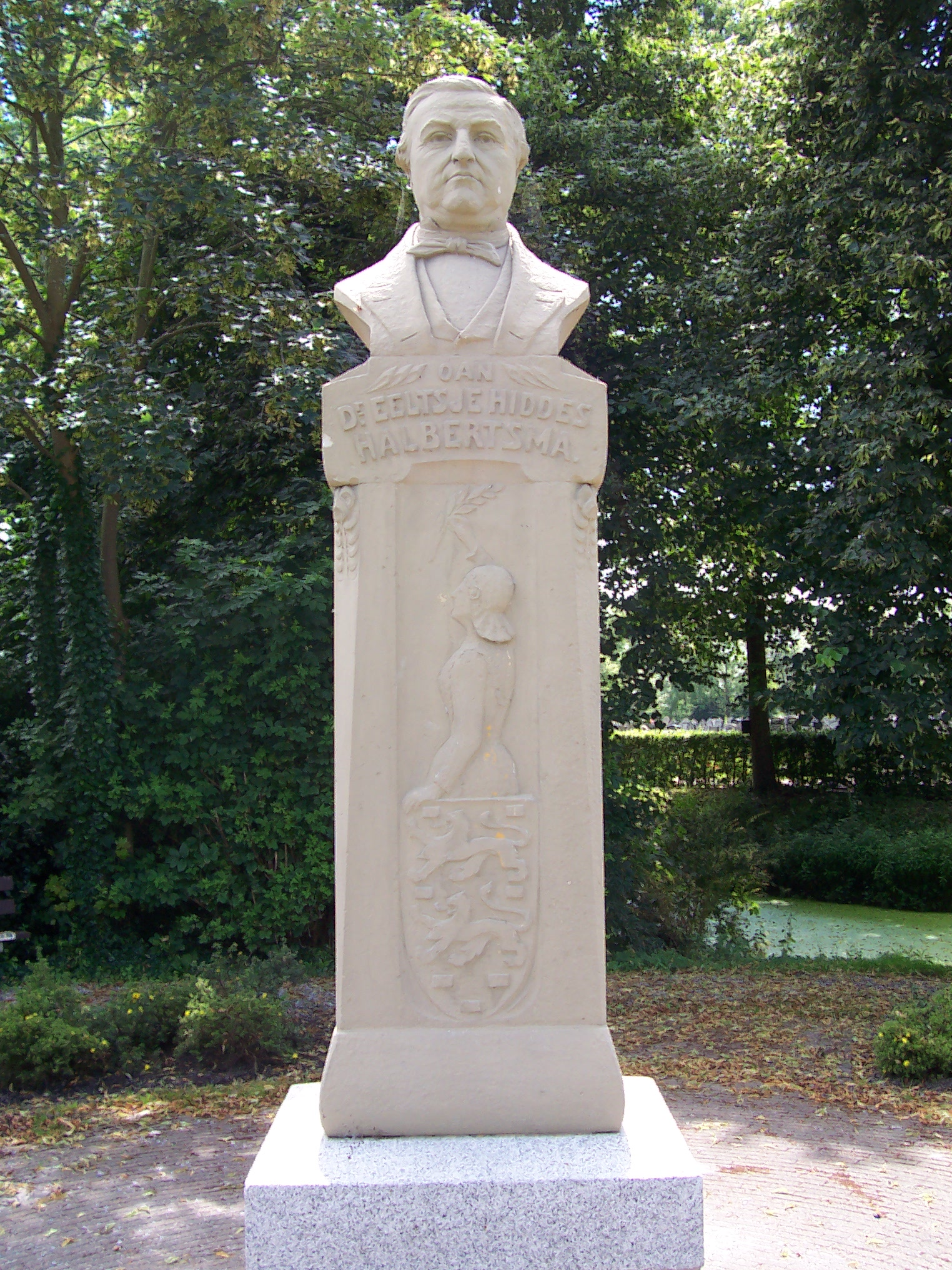
Memorial buste of Eeltje, Grou.
