= Tjalling =

Tjalling is a male Dutch and Frisian given name, and may refer to:

- Tjalling van den Bosch (born 1958), Dutch sportsman
- Tjalling Halbertsma (born 1969), Dutch lawyer and anthropologist
- Tjalling Koopmans (1910–1985), Dutch economist
- Tjalling Waterbolk (1924–2020), Dutch archaeologist
