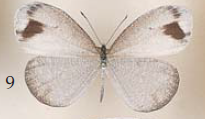
- male
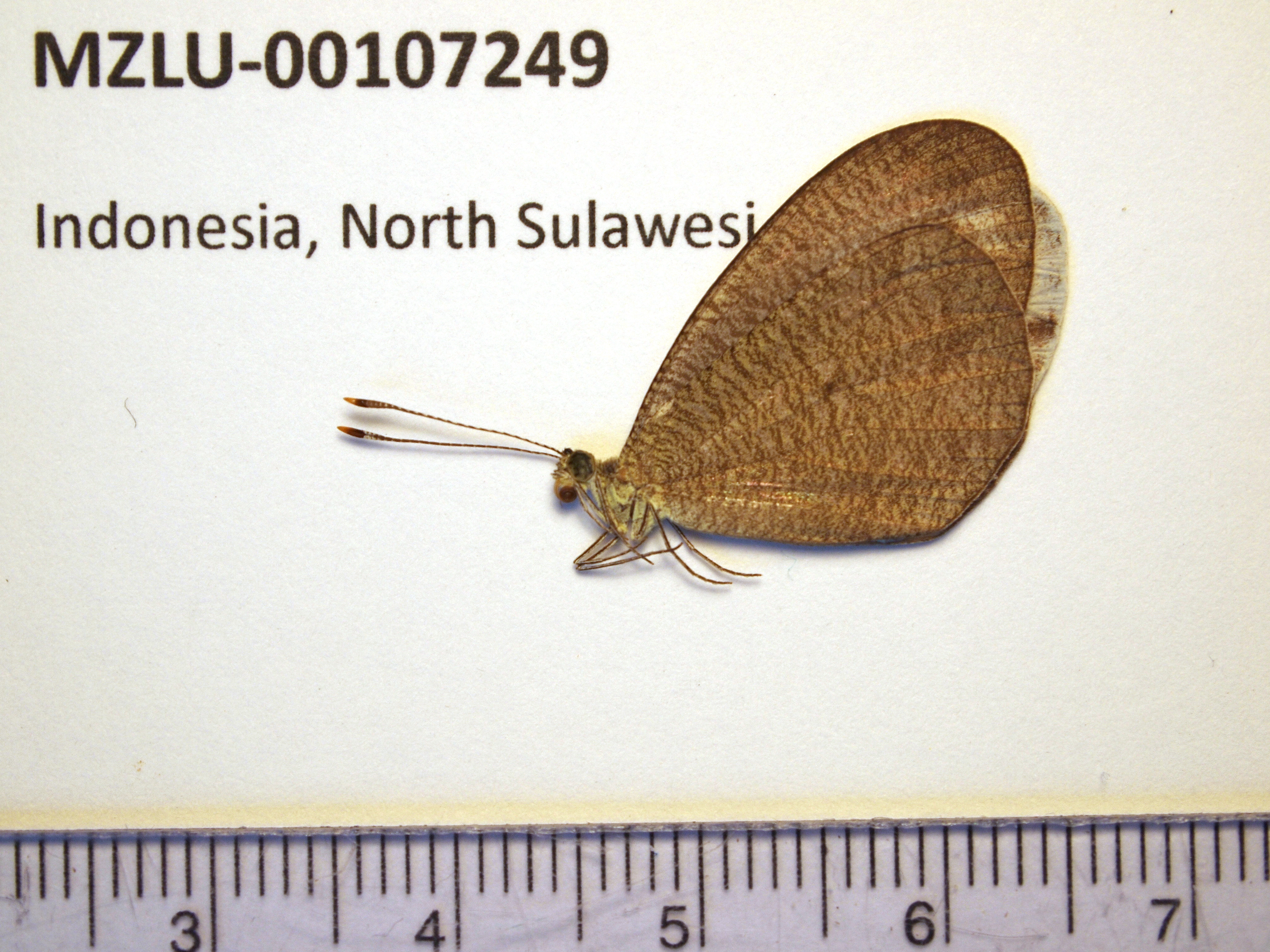

Scientific classification
- Kingdom: Animalia
- Phylum: Arthropoda
- Class: Insecta
- Order: Lepidoptera
- Family: Pieridae
- Genus: Leptosia
- Species: L. lignea

Binomial name
- Leptosia lignea (Vollenhoven, 1865)

Synonyms
- Pontia lignea Vollenhoven, 1865; Leptosia nina lignea Winhard, 2000

= Leptosia lignea =

Sulawesi wood white

Species of butterfly

Leptosia lignea, the Sulawesi wood white, is a butterfly of the family Pieridae, found on Sulawesi.

"M. de Rosenberg" is credited with finding the first specimens, which Samuel Constant Snellen van Vollenhoven then used to describe as a new species in 1865.

Larvae feed on Capparis species.
