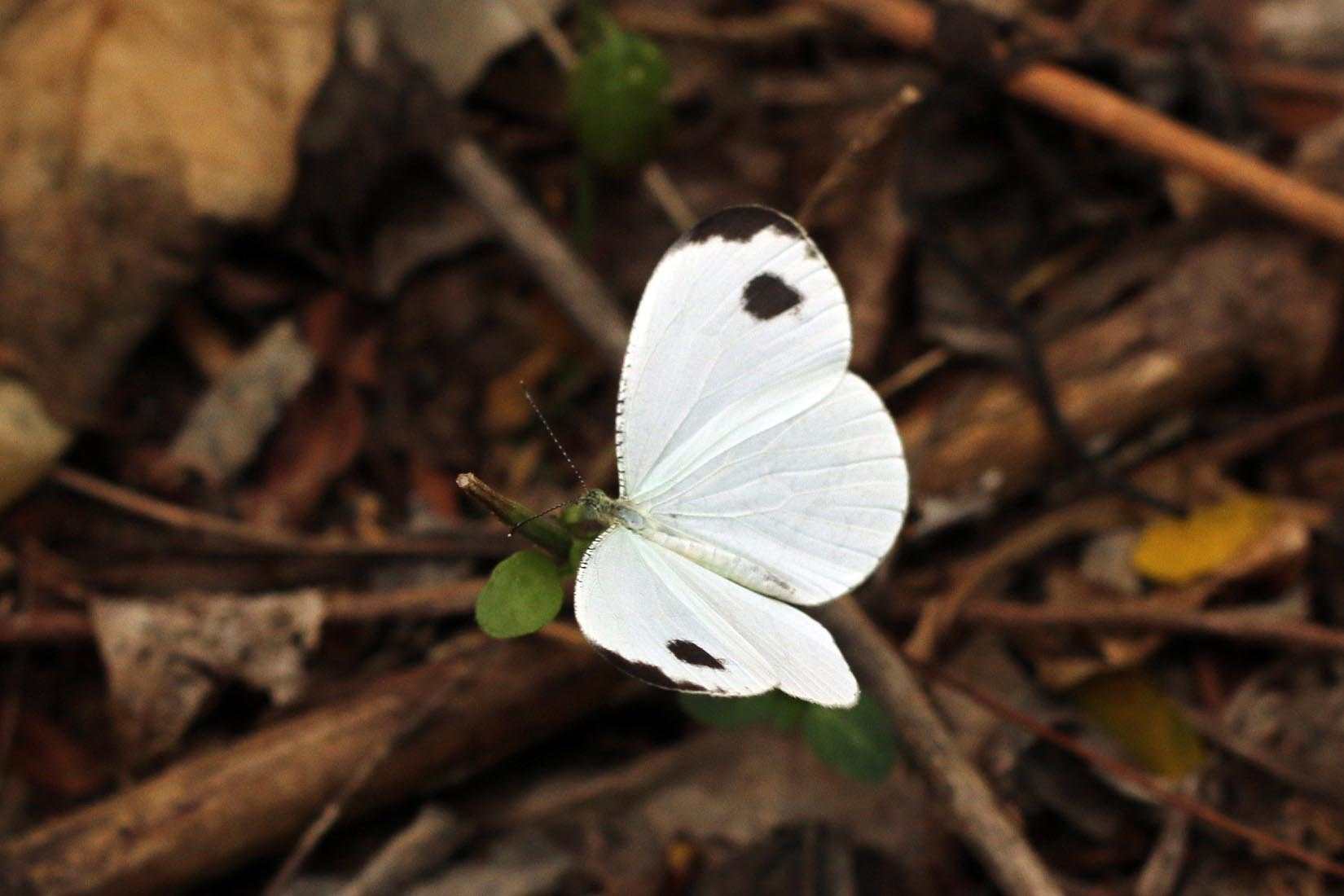

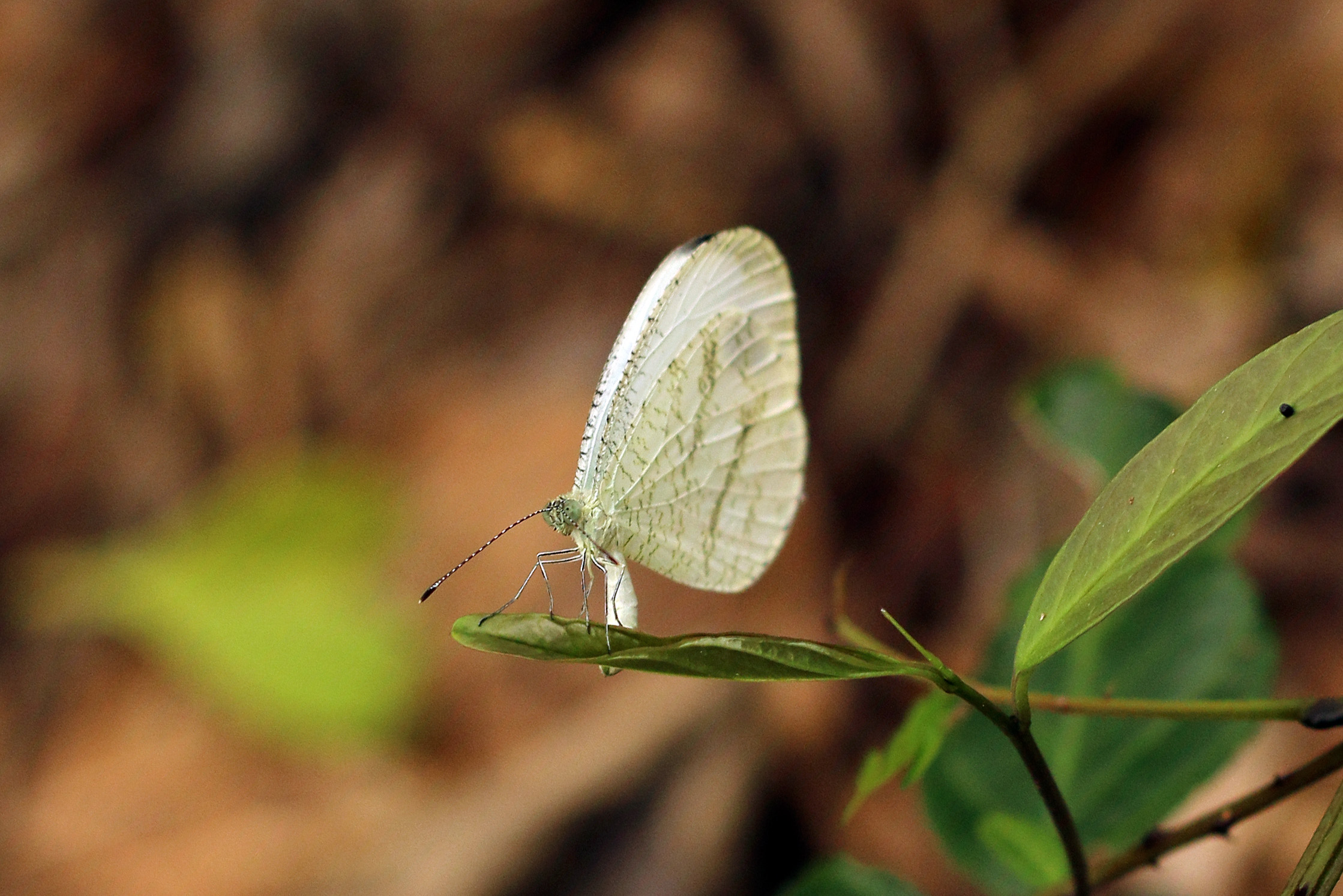
- Both L. a. inalcesta Mabibi, KwaZulu Natal, South Africa

Scientific classification
- Kingdom: Animalia
- Phylum: Arthropoda
- Clade: Pancrustacea
- Class: Insecta
- Order: Lepidoptera
- Family: Pieridae
- Genus: Leptosia
- Species: L. alcesta

Binomial name
- Leptosia alcesta (Stoll, [1782])

Synonyms
- Papilio alcesta Stoll, [1782]; Papilio narica Fabricius, 1793; Pseudopontia cepheus Ehrmann, 1894; Leucophasia sylvicola Boisduval, 1833

= Leptosia alcesta =

African wood white

Species of butterfly

Leptosia alcesta, the African wood white or flip flop, is a butterfly of the family Pieridae, found in Africa.

The wingspan is 30–40 mm in males and 35–42 mm in females. The adults fly year-round, peaking from March to May.

The larvae feed on Ritchiea species, Capparis fascicularis, and Capparis brassii.

== Subspecies ==
- L. a. alcesta (Senegal, Gambia, Guinea-Bissau, Guinea, Liberia, Ivory Coast, Ghana, Togo, Benin, Nigeria, Cameroon, Equatorial Guinea, Gabon, Congo, Central African Republic, Angola, Democratic Republic of the Congo)
- L. a. inalcesta Bernardi, 1959 (Uganda, southern Sudan, Ethiopia, Democratic Republic of the Congo, Kenya, Tanzania, Zambia, Mozambique, eastern Zimbabwe, South Africa, Swaziland)
- L. a. pseudonuptilla Bernardi, 1959 (Democratic Republic of the Congo to Ethiopia)
- L. a. sylvicola (Boisduval, 1833) (Madagascar)
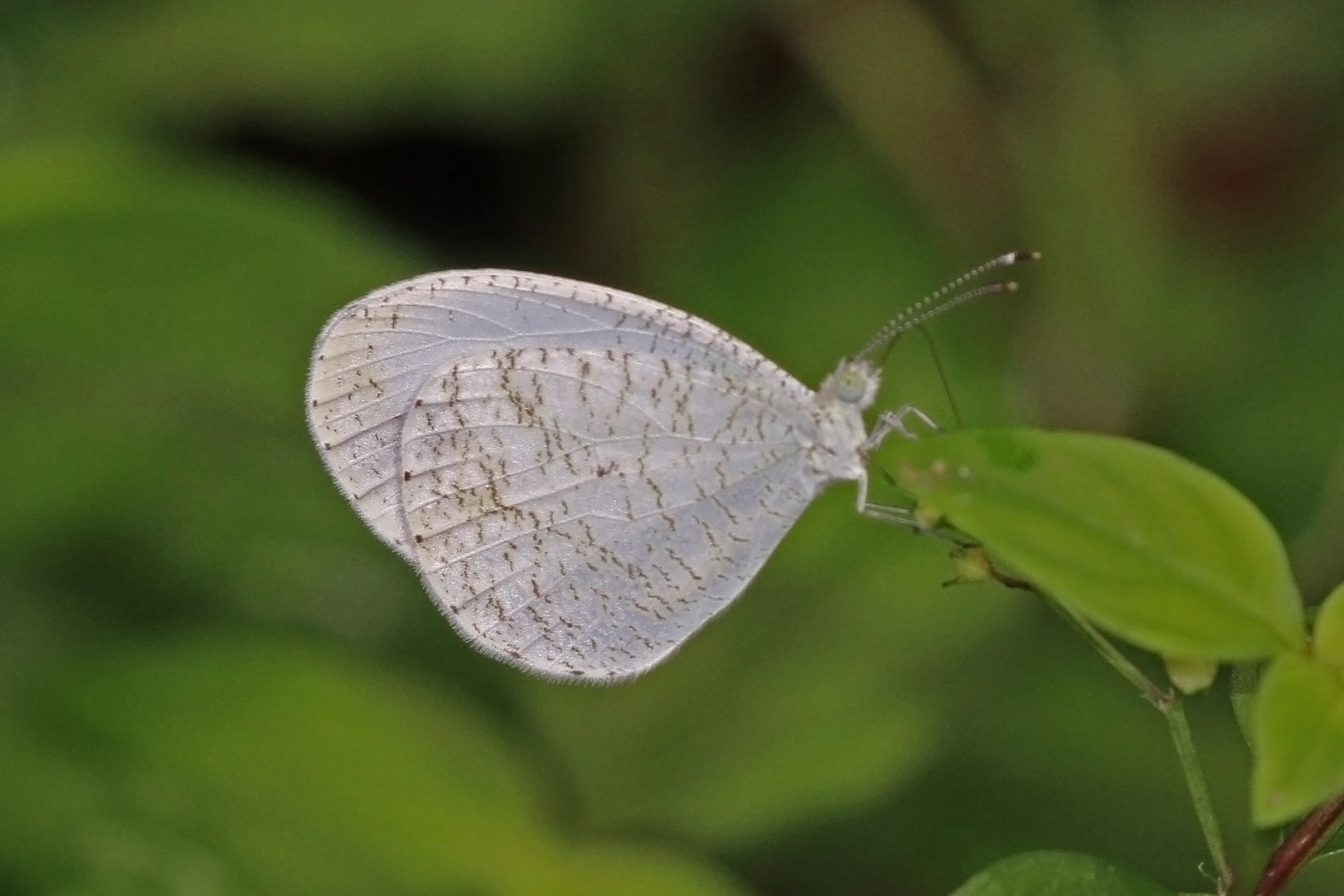
L. a. alcesta, Ghana

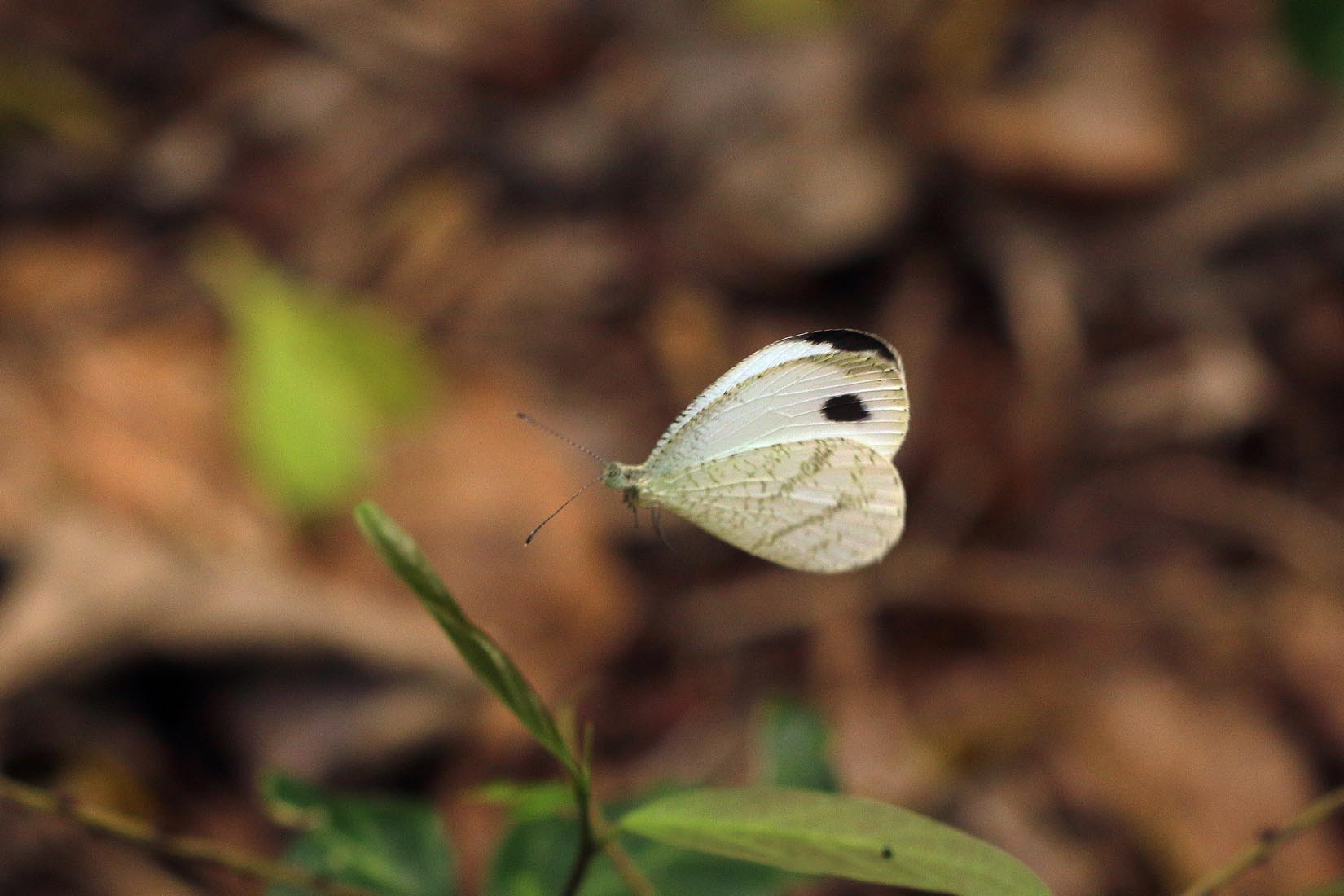
L. a. inalcesta, in flight

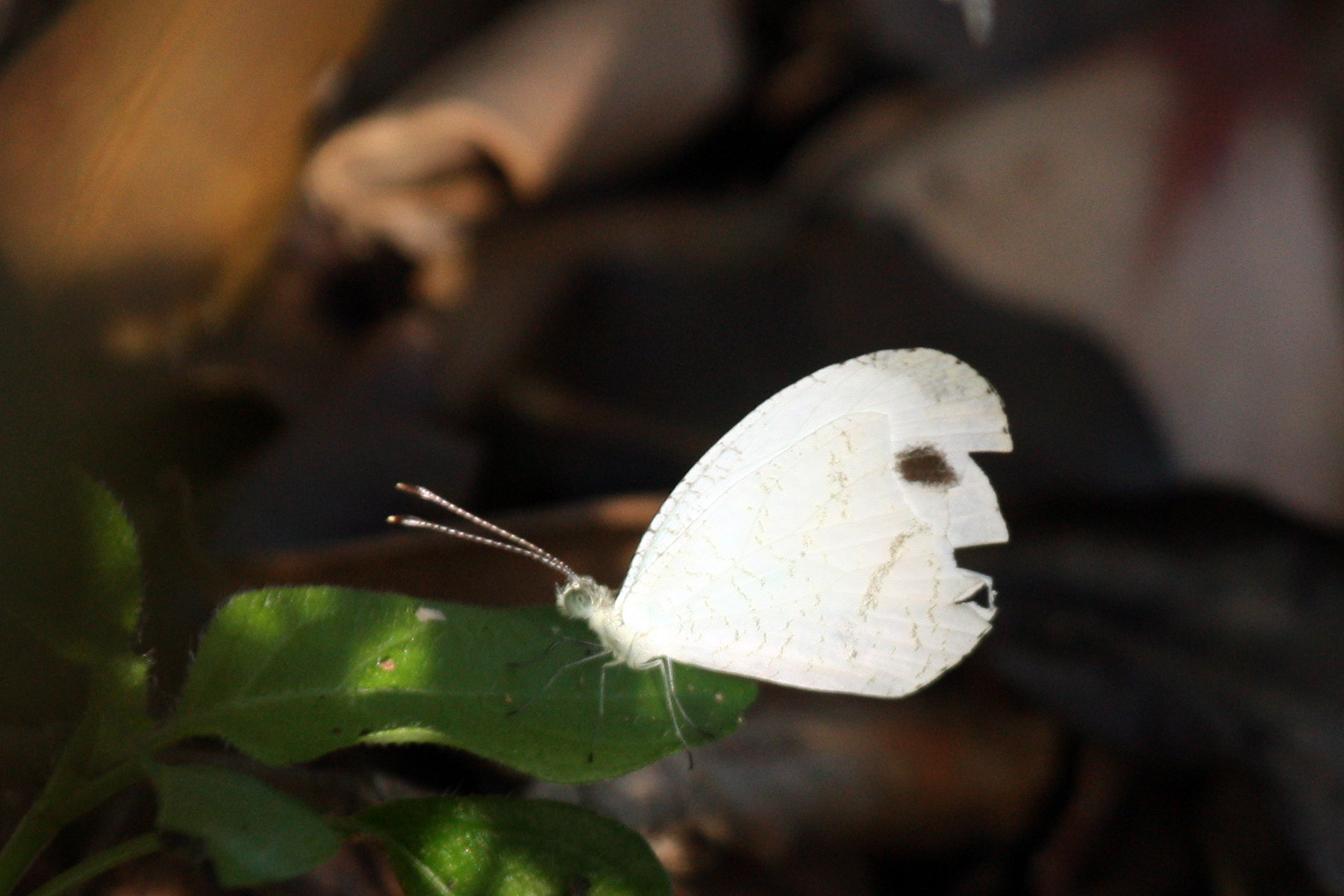
Worn specimen with the appearance of a face

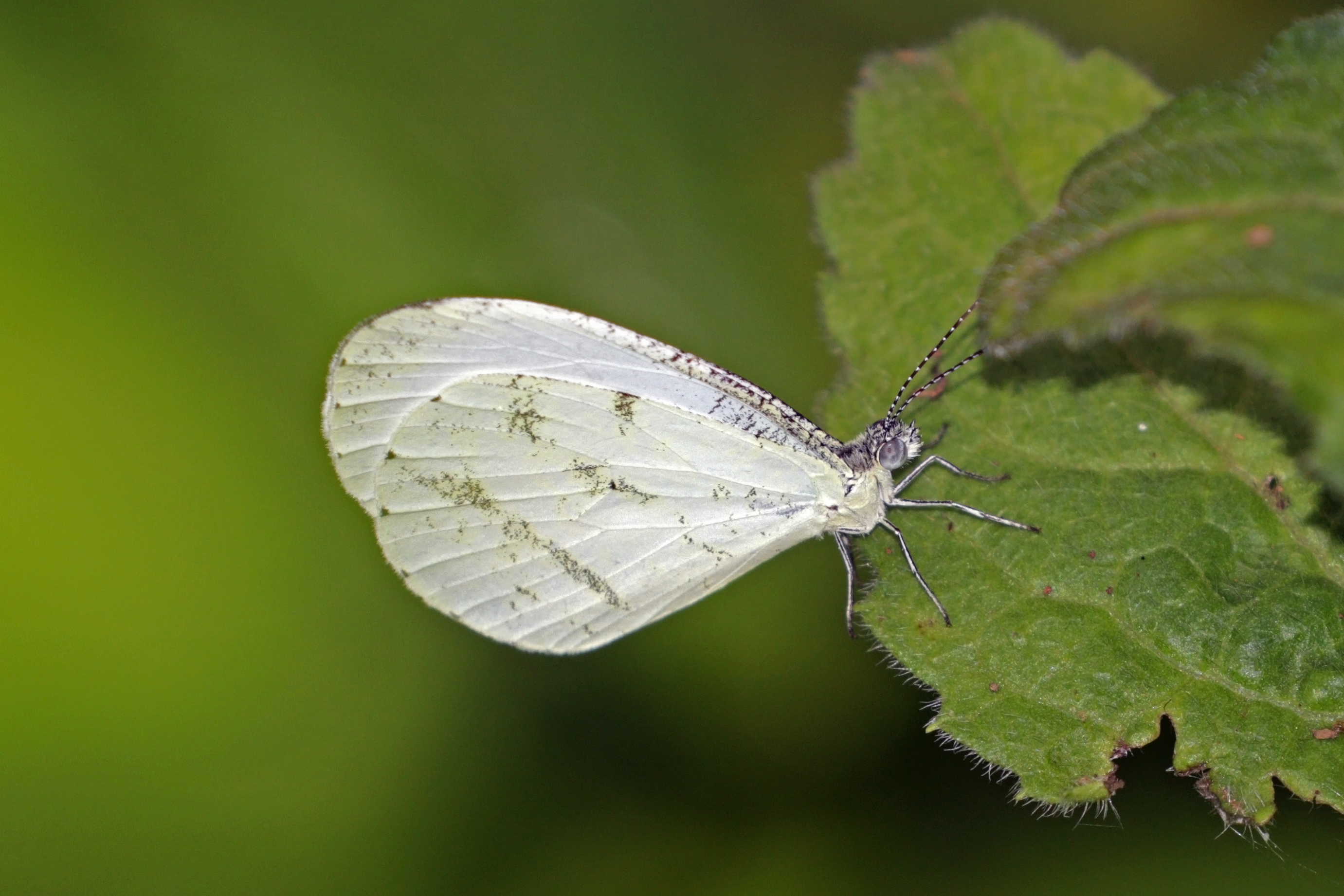
L. a. sylvicola, Madagascar
