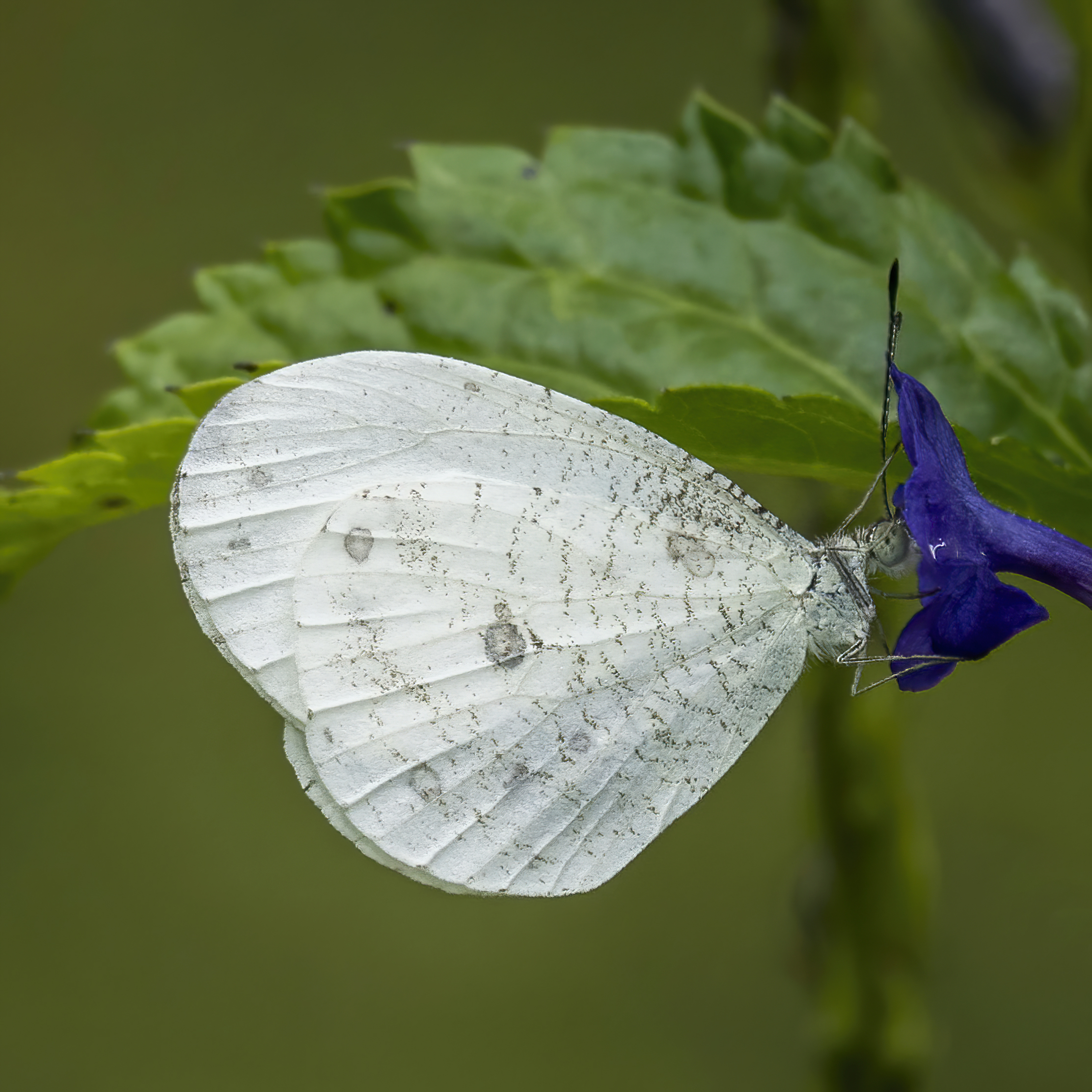
- São Tomé island São Tomé and Príncipe

Scientific classification
- Kingdom: Animalia
- Phylum: Arthropoda
- Class: Insecta
- Order: Lepidoptera
- Family: Pieridae
- Genus: Leptosia
- Species: L. nupta

Binomial name
- Leptosia nupta (Butler, 1873)

Synonyms
- Nychitona nupta Butler, 1873; Leptosia alcesta f. nuptilla Aurivillius, 1910; Leptosia medusa medusa f. pygmaea Birket-Smith, 1960

= Leptosia nupta =

Species of butterfly

Leptosia nupta, the immaculate wood white, petite wood white or immaculate spirit, is a butterfly in the family Pieridae. It was described by Arthur Gardiner Butler in 1873. It is found in Nigeria, Cameroon, Gabon, the Republic of the Congo, Angola, the Democratic Republic of the Congo, Uganda, Rwanda, Kenya, Tanzania, Zambia, Zimbabwe and on Madagascar. The habitat consists of wet, primary forest.

The larvae feed on Capparis species and Rorippa madagascariensis.

== Subspecies ==
- Leptosia nupta nupta (eastern Nigeria, Cameroon, Gabon, Congo, Angola)
- Leptosia nupta pseudonupta Bernardi, 1959 (Democratic Republic of the Congo, Uganda, Rwanda, western Kenya, western Tanzania, Zambia, Zimbabwe)
- Leptosia nupta viettei Bernardi, 1959 (Madagascar)
