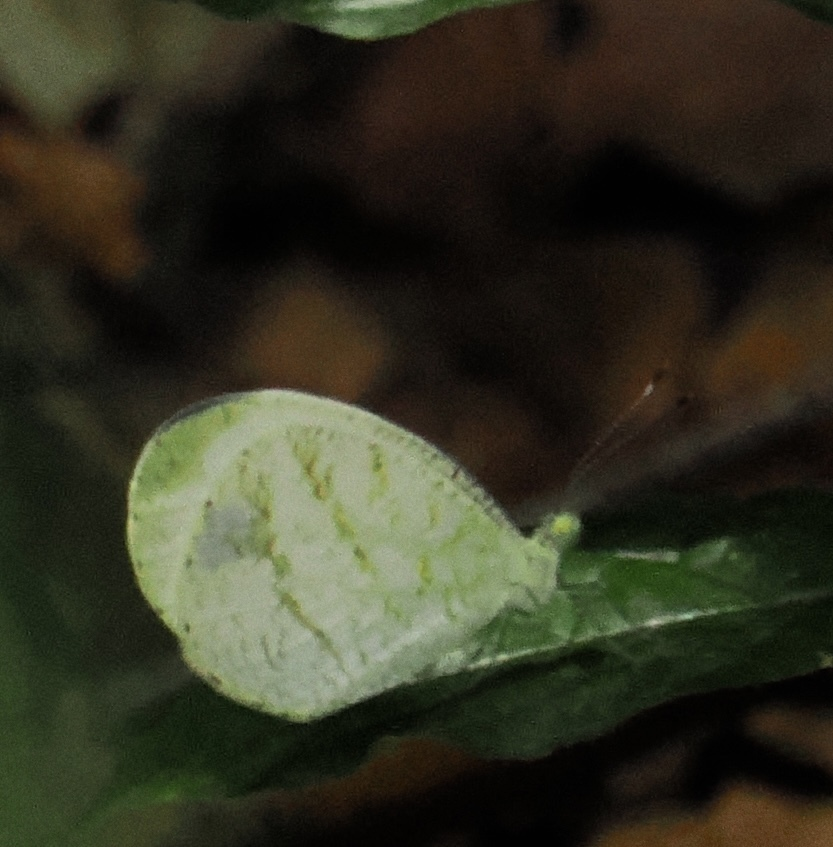

Scientific classification
- Kingdom: Animalia
- Phylum: Arthropoda
- Clade: Pancrustacea
- Class: Insecta
- Order: Lepidoptera
- Family: Pieridae
- Genus: Leptosia
- Species: L. hybrida

Binomial name
- Leptosia hybrida Bernardi, 1952

Synonyms
- Leptosia medusa f. houzeaui Dufrane, 1947; Leptosia medusa ab. reducta Dufrane, 1947; Leptosia medusa ab. submarginata Dufrane, 1947

= Leptosia hybrida =

Hybrid wood white

Species of butterfly

Leptosia hybrida, the hybrid wood white or hybrid spirit, is a butterfly in the family Pieridae. It is found in Guinea, Sierra Leone, Liberia, Ivory Coast, Ghana, Togo, Nigeria, Cameroon, Equatorial Guinea, Gabon, the Republic of the Congo, the Central African Republic, Angola, the Democratic Republic of the Congo, Uganda, Kenya, Tanzania and Zambia. The habitat consists of primary and riparian forest, including riverine vegetation that penetrates moist savanna.

The larvae feed on Capparis species.

== Subspecies ==
- Leptosia hybrida hybrida (Guinea, Sierra Leone, Liberia, Ivory Coast, Ghana, Togo, Nigeria, Cameroon, Equatorial Guinea, Gabon, Congo, Central African Republic, Angola, Democratic Republic of the Congo)
- Leptosia hybrida somereni Bernardi, 1959 (north-eastern Democratic Republic of the Congo, Uganda, western Kenya, Tanzania, Zambia)

Torben Larsen developed a species numbering system for his 2005 publication Butterflies of West Africa. The nominate subspecies is #90. The 'Larsen' numbers have since been used with permission in A Sharp Eye on Butterflies of Ghana.
