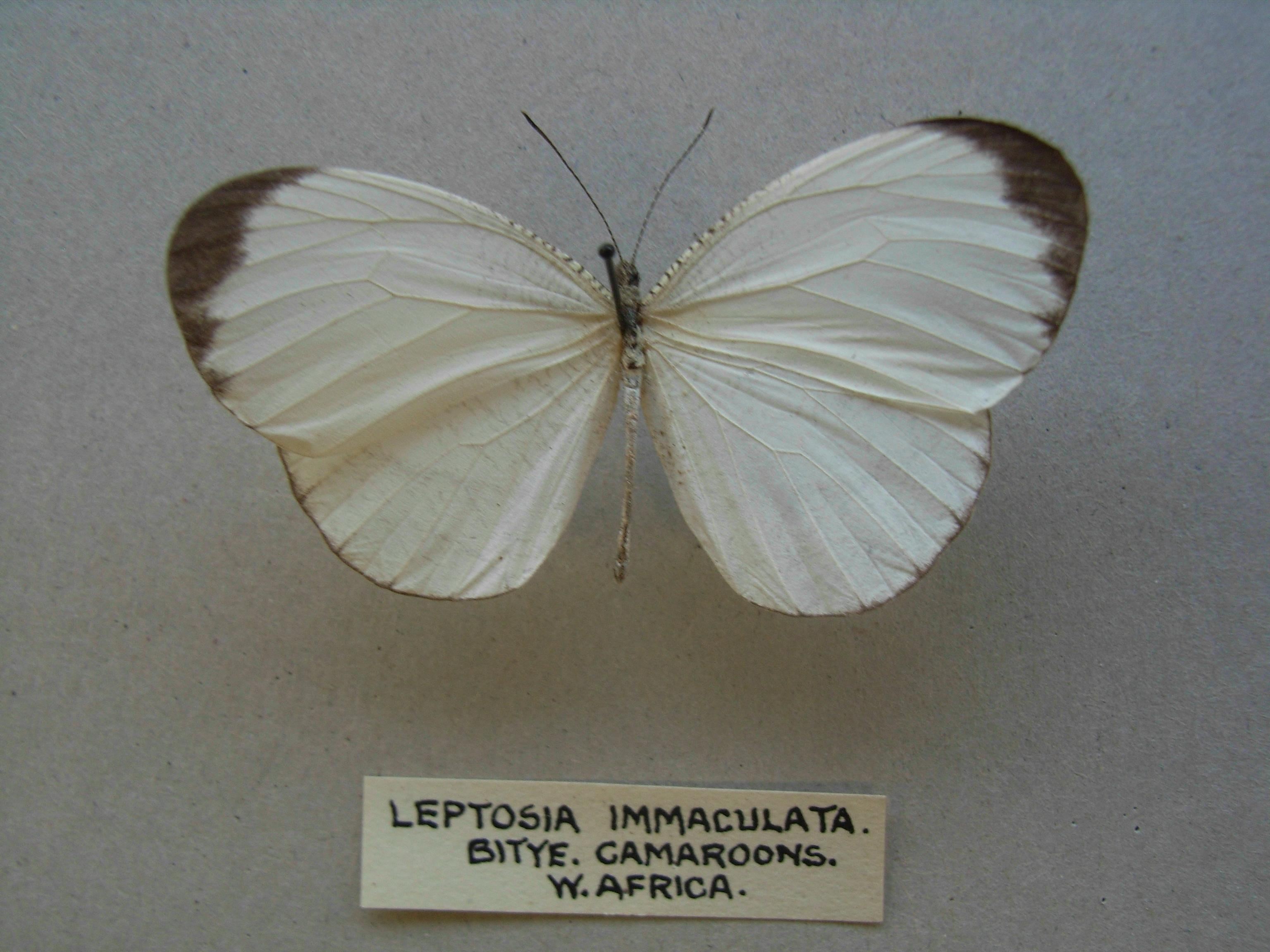

Scientific classification
- Kingdom: Animalia
- Phylum: Arthropoda
- Clade: Pancrustacea
- Class: Insecta
- Order: Lepidoptera
- Family: Pieridae
- Genus: Leptosia
- Species: L. marginea

Binomial name
- Leptosia marginea (Mabille, 1890)

Synonyms
- Pontia marginea Mabille, 1890; Nychitona medusa var. immaculata Aurivillius, 1895

= Leptosia marginea =

Black-edged spirit

Species of butterfly

Leptosia marginea, the black-edged spirit, is a butterfly in the family Pieridae. It is found in Sierra Leone, Liberia, Ivory Coast, Ghana, Togo, Benin, southern Nigeria, Cameroon, Gabon, the Republic of the Congo, the Central African Republic, the western part of the Democratic Republic of the Congo and possibly Uganda and Tanzania. The habitat consists of primary forests.

The larvae feed on Capparis species.

Torben Larsen developed a species numbering system for his 2005 publication Butterflies of West Africa. This species is #92. The 'Larsen' numbers have since been used with permission in A Sharp Eye on Butterflies of Ghana.
