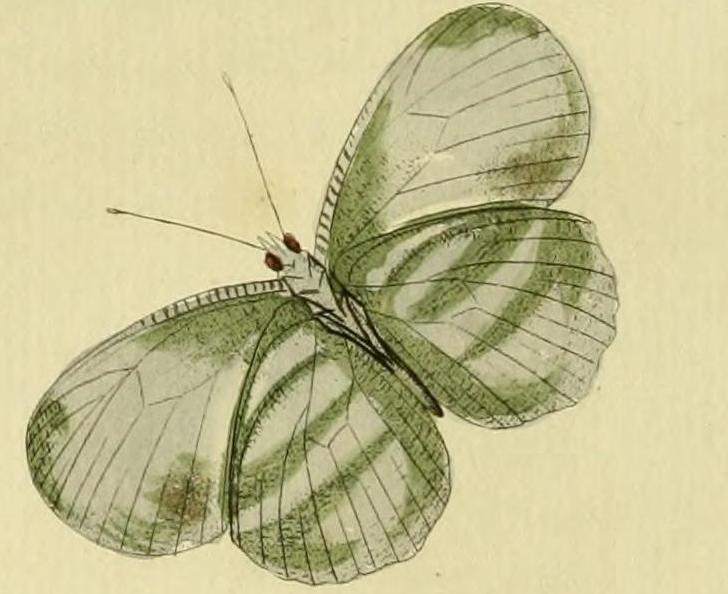
- An adult
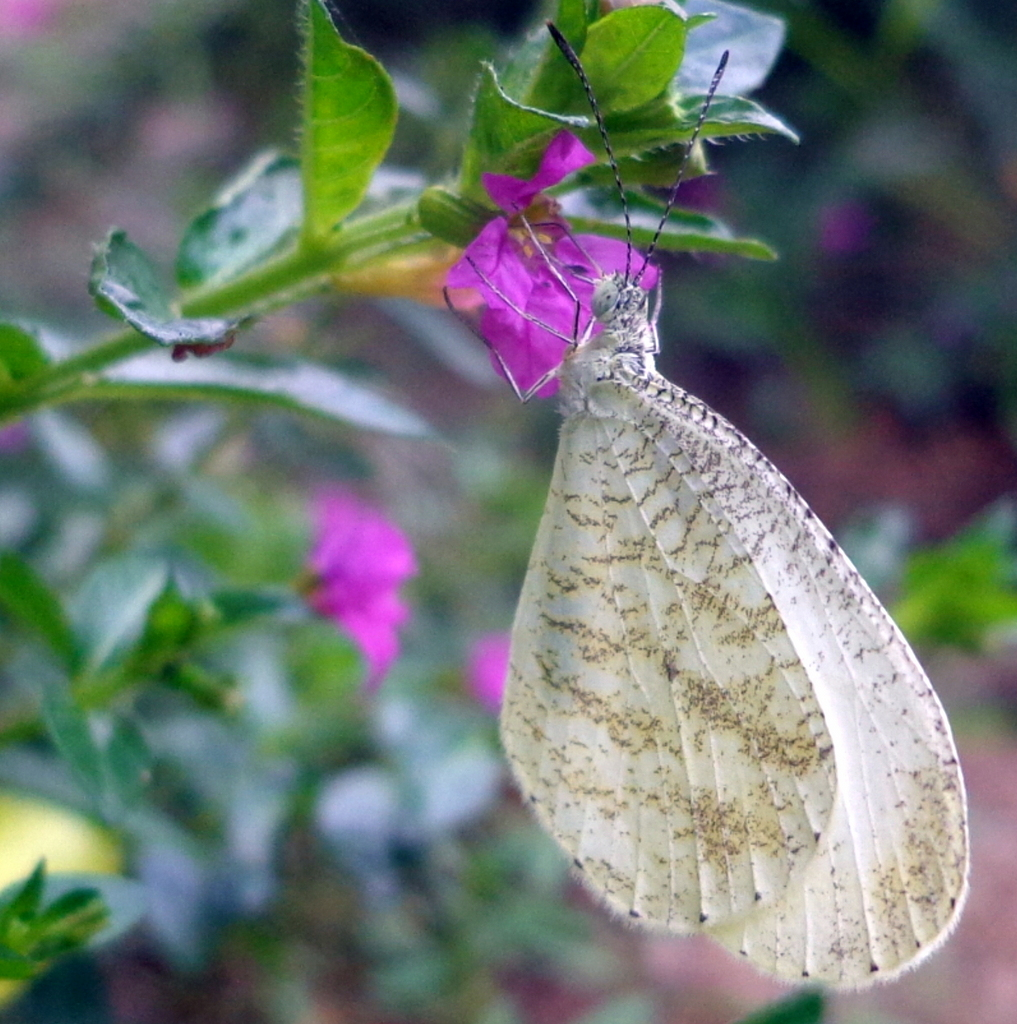
- Feeding on nectar

Scientific classification
- Kingdom: Animalia
- Phylum: Arthropoda
- Clade: Pancrustacea
- Class: Insecta
- Order: Lepidoptera
- Family: Pieridae
- Genus: Leptosia
- Species: L. medusa

Binomial name
- Leptosia medusa (Cramer, 1777)

Synonyms
- Papilio medusa Cramer, 1777; Papilio dorothea Fabricius, 1793; Pieris empeda Godart, 1819

= Leptosia medusa =

Dainty spirit

Species of butterfly

Leptosia medusa, the dainty spirit, is a butterfly in the family Pieridae. It is found in Guinea-Bissau, Guinea, Sierra Leone, Liberia, Ivory Coast, Ghana, Togo and western Nigeria. The habitat consists of forests.

Torben Larsen developed a species numbering system for his 2005 publication Butterflies of West Africa. This species is #91. The 'Larsen' numbers have since been used with permission in A Sharp Eye on Butterflies of Ghana.
