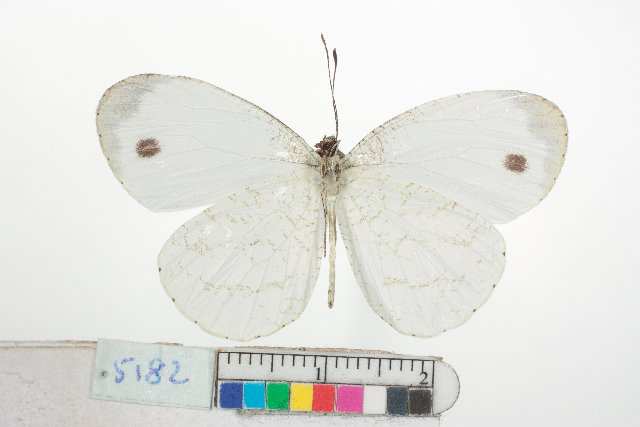

Scientific classification
- Kingdom: Animalia
- Phylum: Arthropoda
- Class: Insecta
- Order: Lepidoptera
- Family: Pieridae
- Genus: Leptosia
- Species: L. wigginsi

Binomial name
- Leptosia wigginsi (Dixey, 1915)

Synonyms
- Nychitona medusa wigginsi Dixey, 1915; Leptosia uganda Neustetter, 1927

= Leptosia wigginsi =

Opaque wood white

Species of butterfly

Leptosia wigginsi, the opaque wood white or opaque spirit, is a butterfly in the family Pieridae. It is found in Senegal, Sierra Leone, Liberia, Ivory Coast, Ghana, Togo, Benin, Nigeria, Cameroon, the Central African Republic, the Democratic Republic of the Congo, Uganda, Kenya and Tanzania. The habitat consists of primary lowland forests.

The larvae feed on Capparis species.

== Subspecies ==
- Leptosia wigginsi wigginsi – (eastern Democratic Republic of Congo, Uganda, south-western Kenya, western Tanzania)
- Leptosia wigginsi pseudalcesta Bernardi, 1965 – (Senegal, Sierra Leone, Liberia, Ivory Coast, Ghana, Togo, Benin, Nigeria, Cameroon, Central African Republic, Democratic Republic of the Congo)
