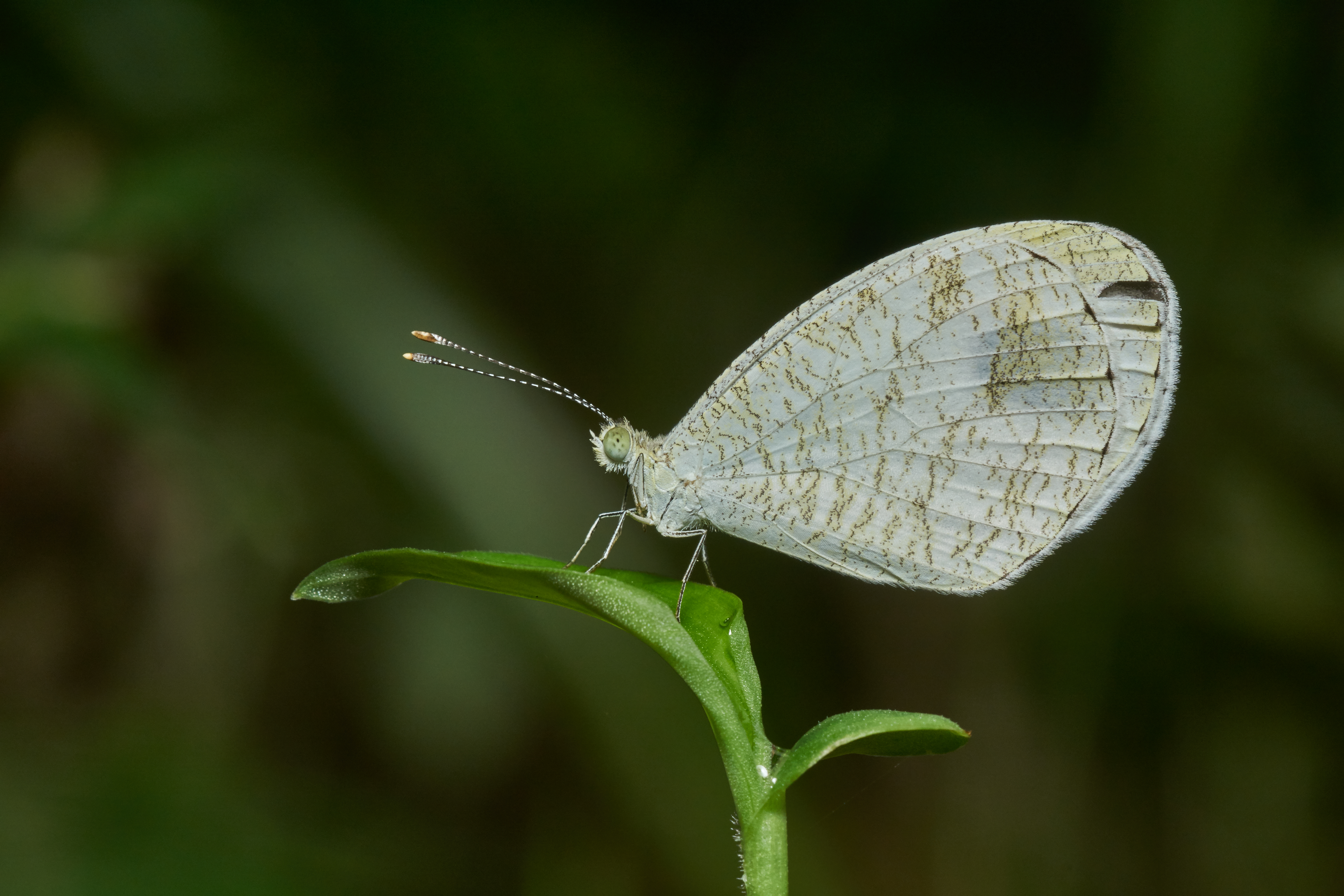
- L. n. nina, Kerala
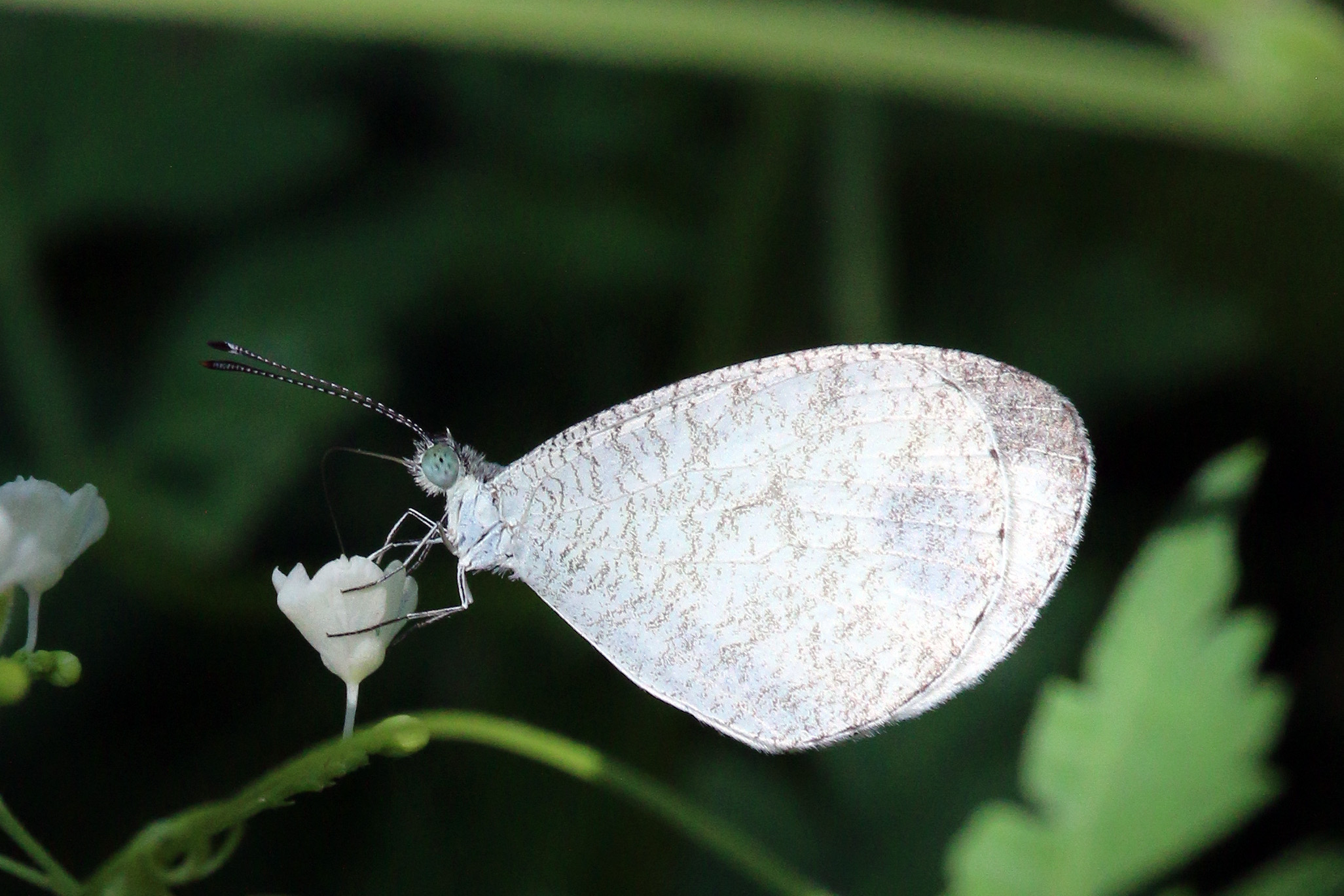
- L. n. fumigata, Indonesia

Scientific classification
- Kingdom: Animalia
- Phylum: Arthropoda
- Clade: Pancrustacea
- Class: Insecta
- Order: Lepidoptera
- Family: Pieridae
- Genus: Leptosia
- Species: L. nina

Binomial name
- Leptosia nina (Fabricius, 1793)

Synonyms
- Papilio nina Fabricius, 1793; Leptosia chlorographa Hübner, 1818; Papilio xiphia Fabricius, 1781 (preocc.); Leptosia xiphia; Pontia crokera MacLeay, [1826]; Pontia niobe Wallace, 1866; Pontia dione Wallace, 1867; Nychitona xiphia var. nicobarica Doherty, 1886; Leptosia xiphia fumigata Fruhstorfer, 1903; Leptosia aurisparsa Fruhstorfer; Leptosia xiphia comma Fruhstorfer, 1903

= Leptosia nina =

Species of butterfly

Leptosia nina, the psyche, is a small butterfly of the family Pieridae (the sulphurs, yellows and whites) and is found in Indian subcontinent, southeast Asia and Australia. The upper forewing has a black spot on a mainly white background. The flight is weak and erratic and the body of the butterfly bobs up and down as it beats its wings. They fly low over the grass and the butterfly rarely leaves the ground level.

== Description ==
From Charles Thomas Bingham's The Fauna of British India, Including Ceylon and Burma. Butterflies. Vol 2. (1907)

- Unpublished manuscript of Lionel de Nicéville gives it the common name of "wandering snowflake"
- Upperside: white; base of wings very slightly powdered with minute black scales. Forewing: costa speckled obscurely with black; apex black, the inner margin of this inwardly angulate; a very large somewhat pear-shaped post-discal spot also black. Hindwing white, uniform; in most specimens an obscure, extremely slender, terminal black line.
- Underside: white; costal margin and apex of forewing broadly, and the whole surface of the hindwing irrorated (speckled) with transverse, very slender, greenish strigae and minute dots; these on the hindwing have a tendency to form sub-basal, medial and discal obliquely transverse obscure bands; forewing: the postdiscal black spot as on the upperside; terminal margins of both forewings and hindwings with minute black, short, transverse slender lines at the apices of the veins, that have a tendency to coalesce and form a terminal continuous line as on the upperside. Antennae dark brown spotted with white, head slightly brownish, thorax and abdomen white. Female: similar, the black markings on the upperside of the forewing on the whole slightly broader, but not invariably so.
- Wingspan: 25–53 mm
- Habitat: The lower ranges of the Himalayas from Mussoorie to Sikkim; Central, Western and Southern India, but not in the desert tracts; Sri Lanka; Assam; Burma and Tenasserim; extending to China and the Malayan region.
- Larva: Green with a pale glaucous tinge about the bases of the legs and slightly hairy. Feeds on capers. Capparis zeylanica has been noted as a food plant.
- larva also feeds on leaves of Cardamine & Cleome species.
- Pupa: Sometimes green, but more often of a delicate pink shade. Both the larva and pupa are very like those of Terias hecabe, but more delicately formed. (Davidson, Bell and Aitken quoted in Bingham)

== Subspecies ==
Listed alphabetically:

- L. n. aebutia Fruhstorfer, 1910 (Tanahdjampea, Kalao)
- L. n. chlorographa Hübner, [1813] (Java)
- L. n. comma Fruhstorfer, 1903 (Timor to Tanimbar)
- L. n. dione (Wallace, 1867) (southern Sulawesi)
- L. n. fumigata Fruhstorfer, 1903 (Lombok, Sumbawa, Flores, Solor)
- L. n. georgi Fruhstorfer (northern Philippines)
- L. n. malayana Fruhstorfer, 1910 (Peninsular Malaya, Singapore, Sumatra, Borneo, Bangka, Biliton)
- L. n. nicobarica (Doherty, 1886) (Nicobars)
- L. n. nina (India, Sri Lanka to Indo-China, Thailand, Langkawi, Andamans)
- L. n. niobe (Wallace, 1866) (Taiwan)
- L. n. terentia Fruhstorfer (southern Philippines)

== Gallery ==
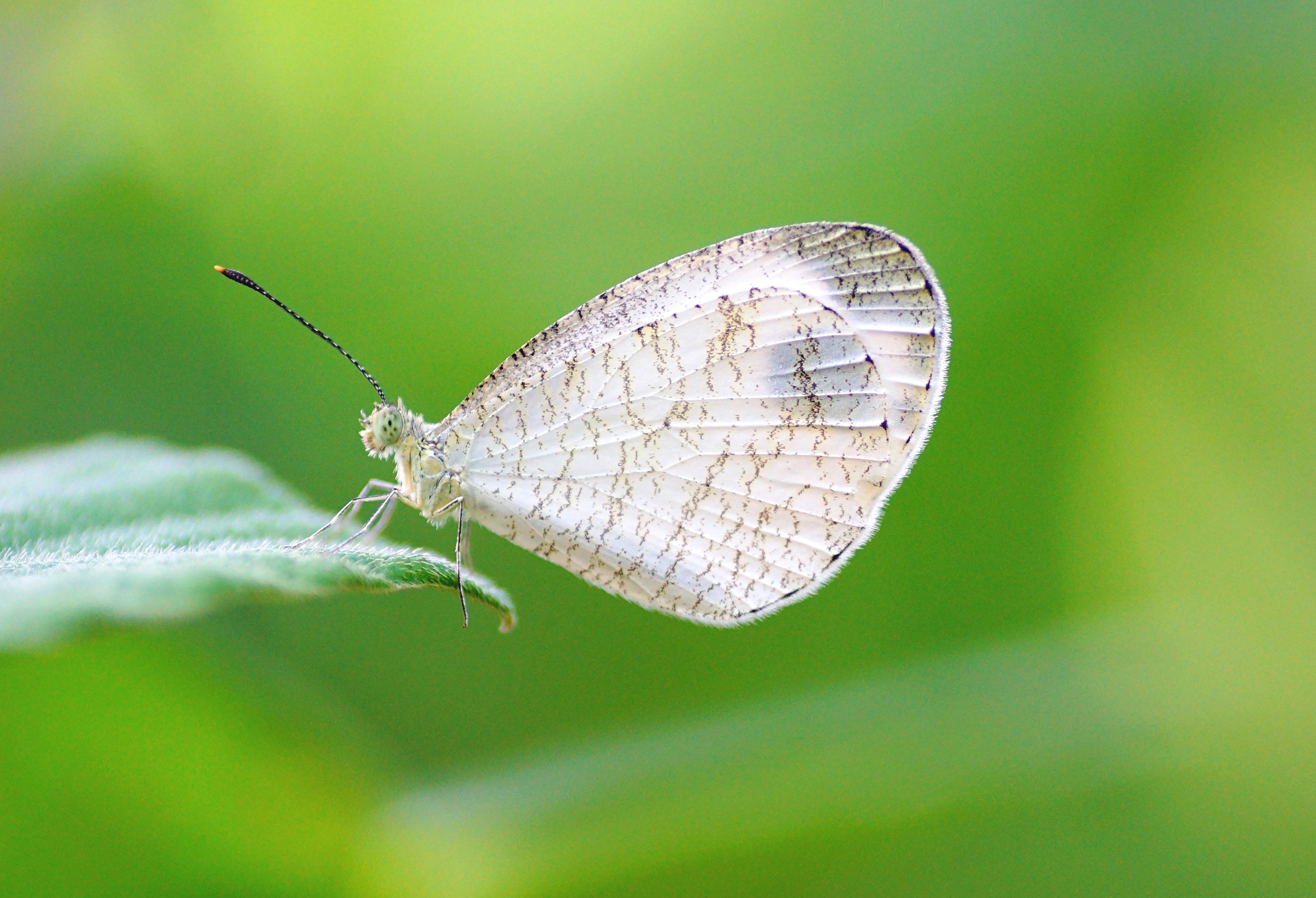
In Kerala, India

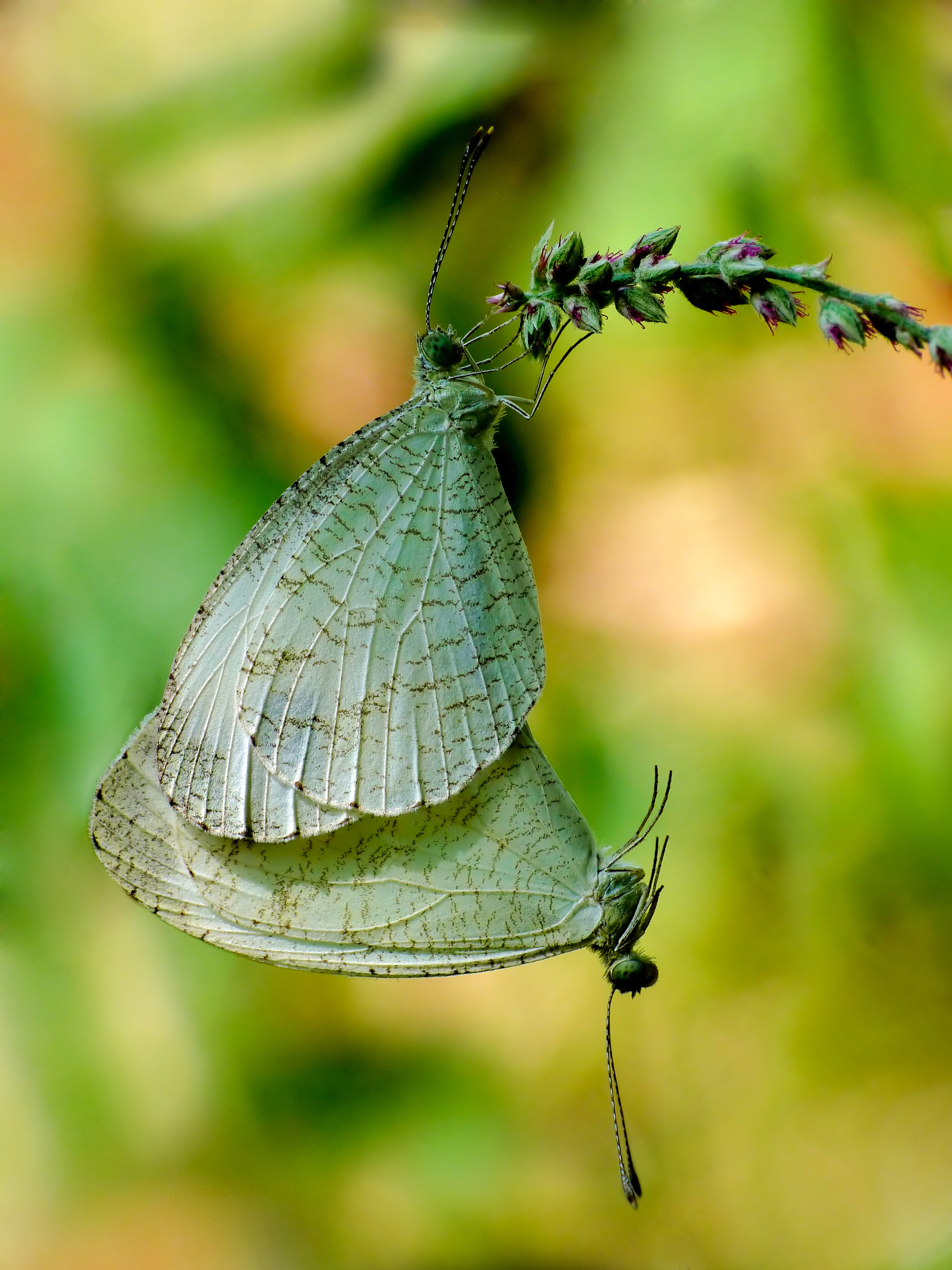
Mating

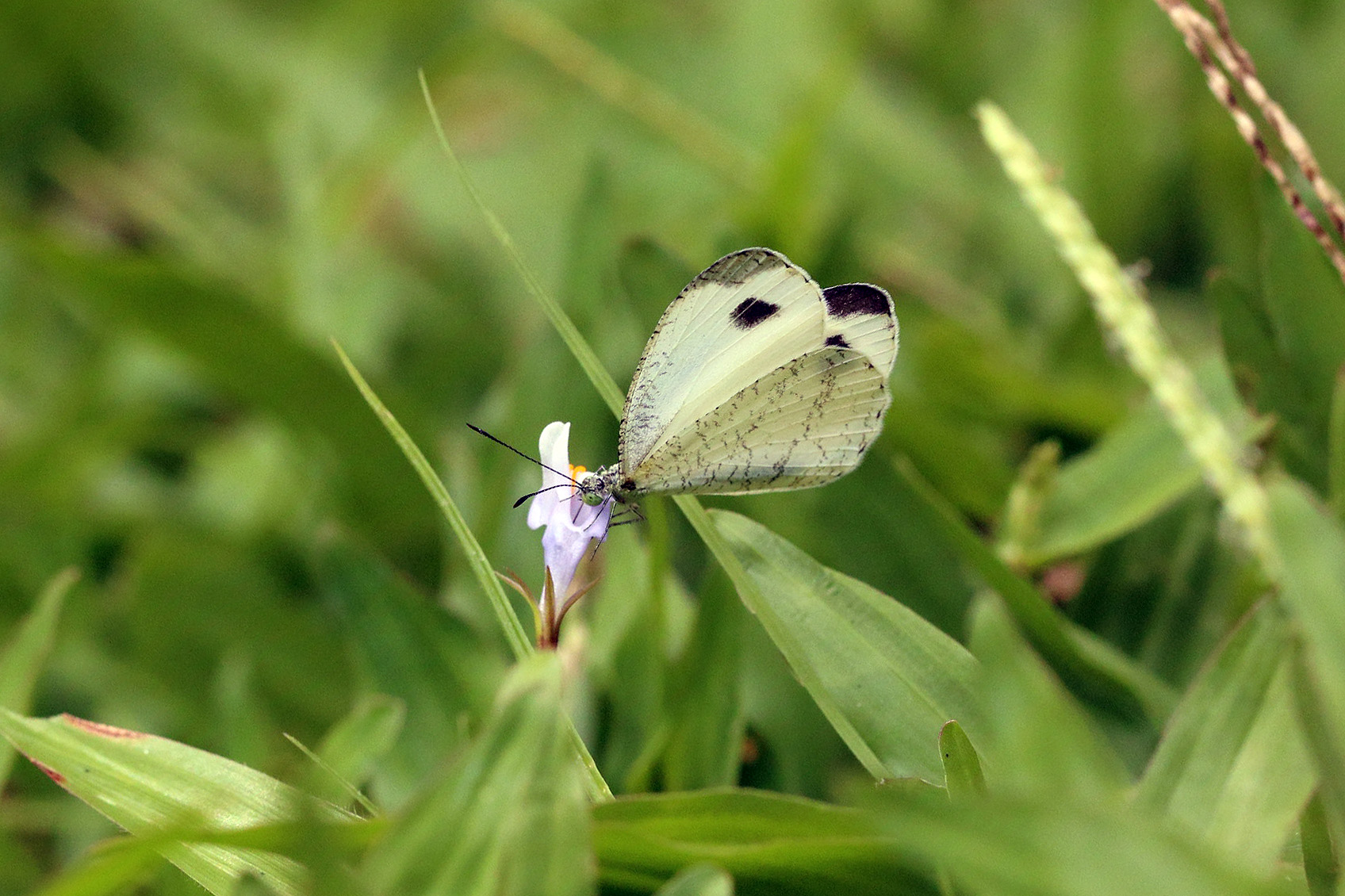
L. n. malayana, Borneo, Malaysia

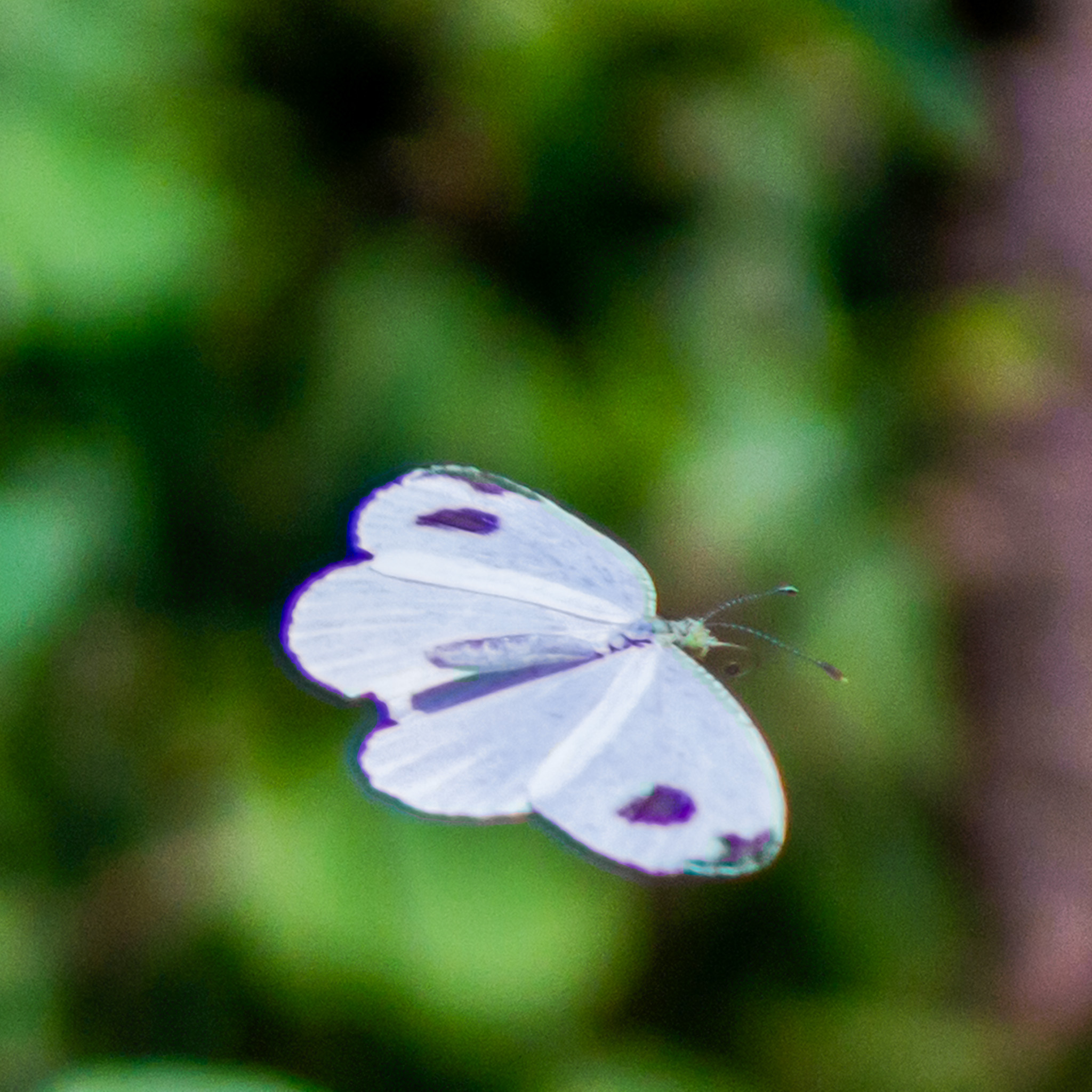
Mid-flight, Sri Lanka with a clear view of the forewing

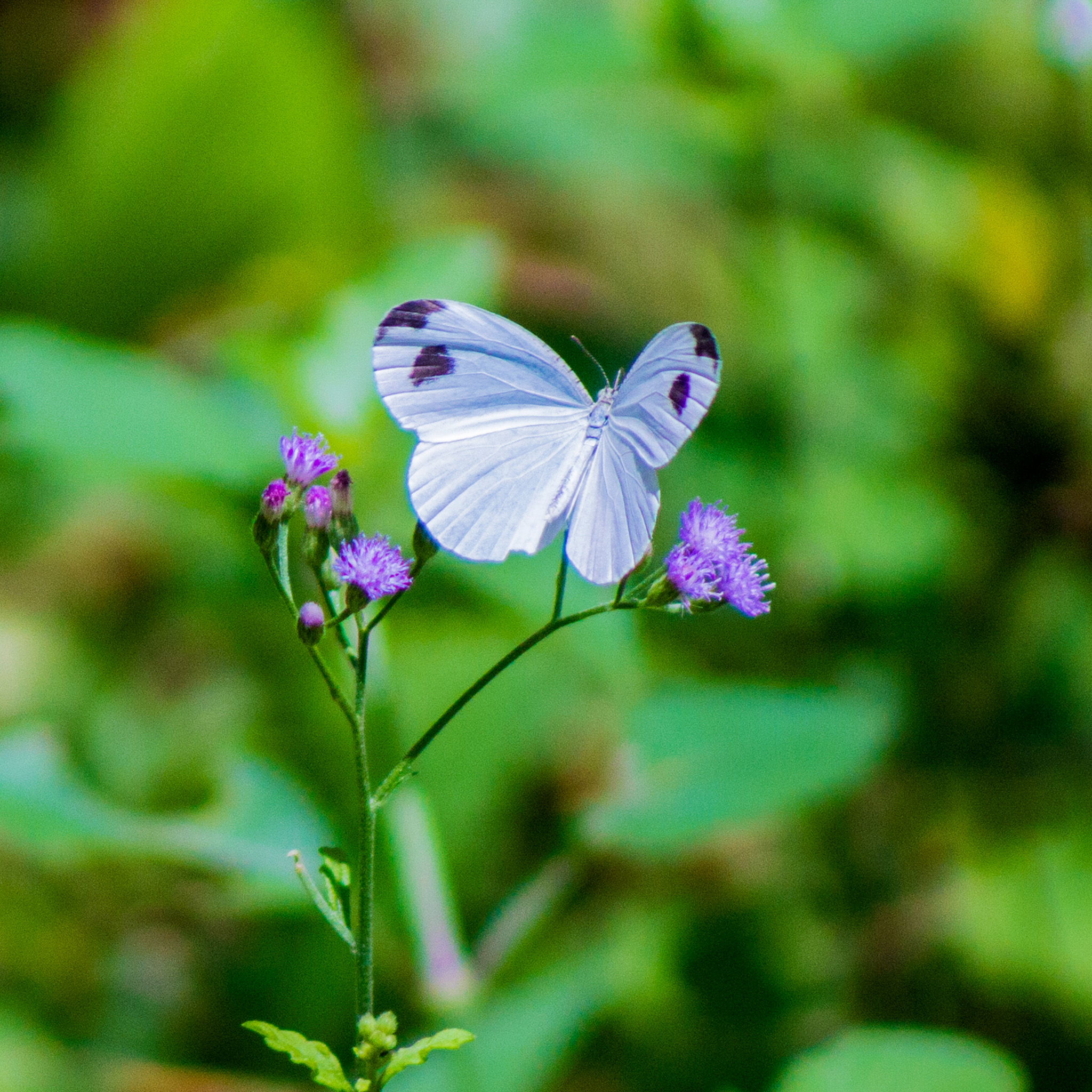
Mid-flight, Sri Lanka with a clear view of the forewing

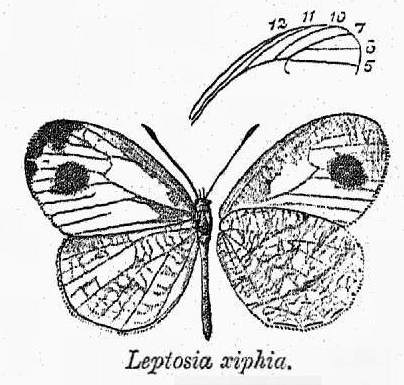

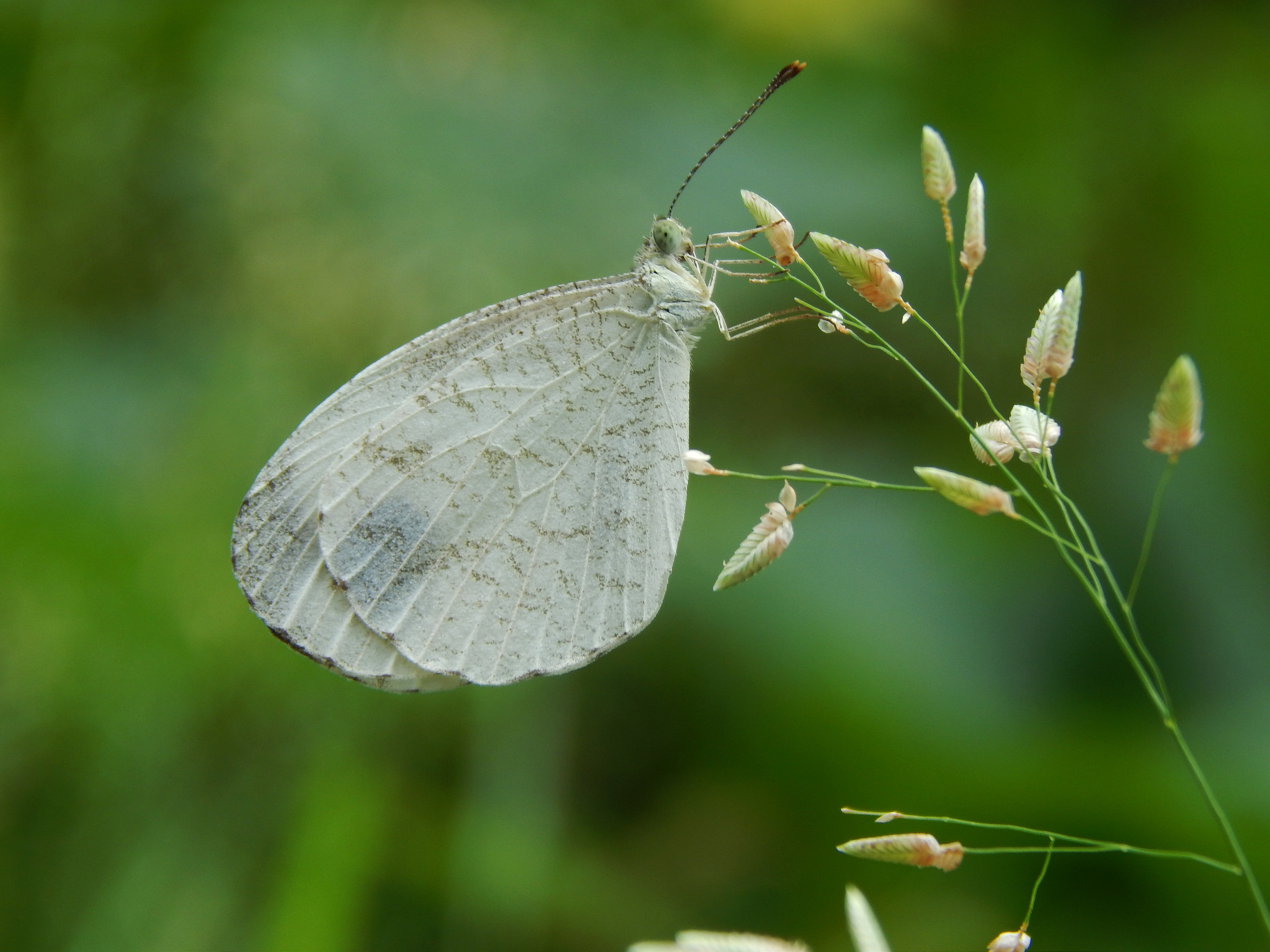
In Areekode, Kerala, India

== See also ==
- List of butterflies of India (Pieridae)
