= Leptosia bastini =

Scientific classification
- Kingdom: Animalia
- Phylum: Arthropoda
- Class: Insecta
- Order: Lepidoptera
- Family: Pieridae
- Genus: Leptosia
- Species: L. bastini

Binomial name
- Leptosia bastini Hecq, 1997

Synonyms
- Leptosia medusa var. fuscolimbata Gaede, 1916

Species of butterfly

Leptosia bastini is a butterfly in the family Pieridae. It is found in the Central African Republic and south-eastern Cameroon. The habitat consists of forests.
