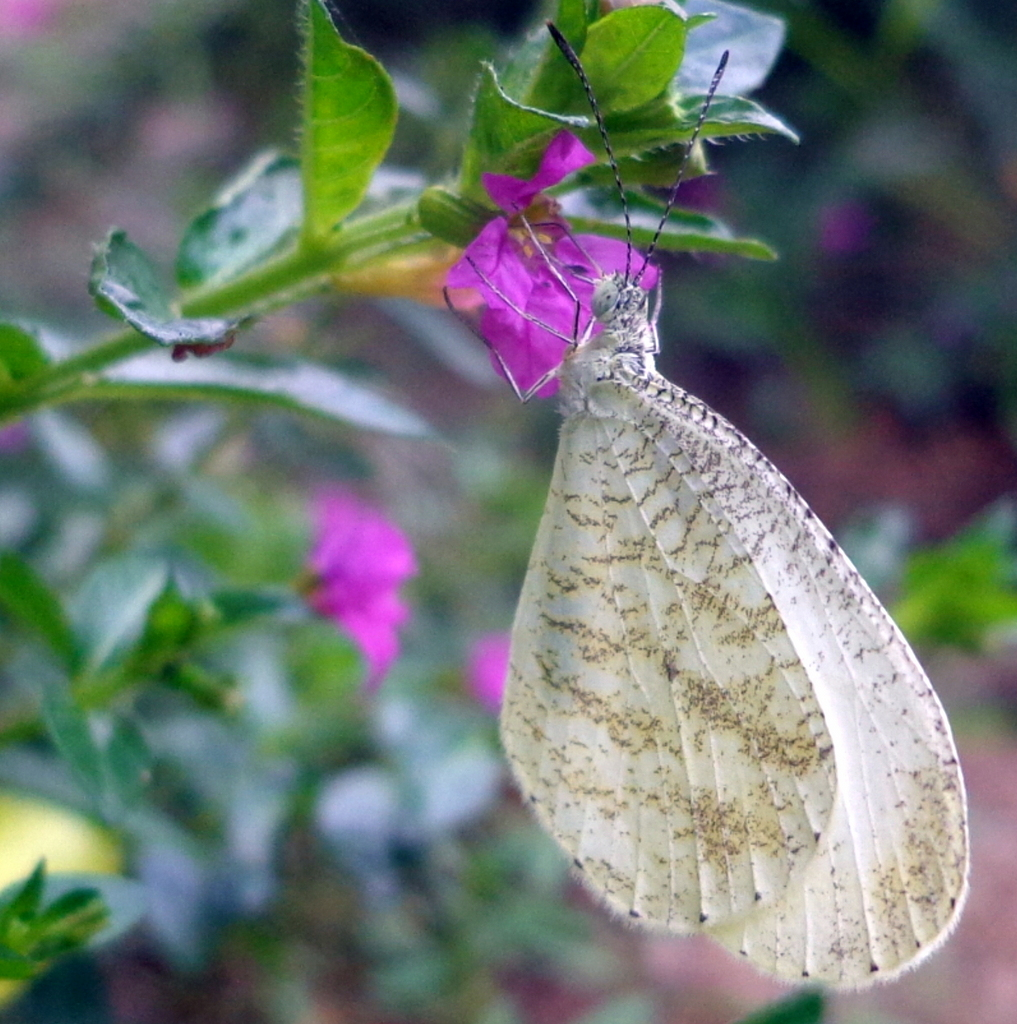
- Leptosia medusa

Scientific classification
- Kingdom: Animalia
- Phylum: Arthropoda
- Class: Insecta
- Order: Lepidoptera
- Family: Pieridae
- Tribe: Leptosiaini; Braby, 2014
- Genus: Leptosia; Hübner, 1818

Species
- Several, see text

Synonyms
- Nina Horsfield, [1829]; Nychitona Butler, 1870

= Leptosia =

Butterfly genus in family Pieridae

Leptosia, commonly called wood whites, is a genus of pierid butterflies. It is the only genus of the tribe Leptosiaini. Leptosia are found in Africa, except for Leptosia nina, which ranges from India to Australia, and Leptosia lignea, which is found only on Sulawesi. All have a frail appearance and broad rounded wings. They are only distantly related to the Palearctic wood whites Leptidea (Dismorphiinae).

== Species ==
Listed alphabetically:

- Leptosia alcesta (Stoll, [1782]) – African wood white or flip flop (Sub-Saharan Africa)
- Leptosia bastini Hecq, 1997
- Leptosia hybrida Bernardi, 1952 – hybrid wood white (western Africa)
- Leptosia lignea (Vollenhoven, 1865) – (endemic to Sulawesi)
- Leptosia marginea (Mabille, 1890) – black-edged spirit (western Africa)
- Leptosia medusa (Cramer, [1777]) – dainty spirit (western Africa)
- Leptosia nina (Fabricius, 1793) – Psyche (Southeast Asia to Australia)
- Leptosia nupta (Butler, 1873) – immaculate wood white (western Africa)
- Leptosia wigginsi (Dixey, 1915) – opaque wood white (central Africa)
