= Vollenhoven =

Vollenhoven is a Dutch surname. Notable people with the surname include:

- Cornelis Vollenhoven (1778–1849), Dutch politician
- D. H. Th. Vollenhoven (1892–1978), Dutch philosopher
- Hanna Vollenhoven (1889–1972), Dutch composer and pianist

== See also ==
- Van Vollenhoven
