= Van Vollenhoven =

Van Vollenhoven is a Dutch and Afrikaans surname. Notable people with the surname include:

- Cornelis van Vollenhoven (1874–1933), Dutch academic and legal scholar
- Joost van Vollenhoven (1877–1918), Dutch-born French soldier and colonial administrator
- Pieter van Vollenhoven (born 1939), Dutch royalty
- Tom van Vollenhoven (1935–2017), South African rugby player
- Samuel Constantinus Snellen van Vollenhoven (1816–1880) Dutch entomologist

== See also ==
- Vollenhoven
