= Tjalling Halbertsma =

Tjalling Halbertsma (born 1969 in Doorn) is a lawyer and anthropologist from the Netherlands. Since 1996 he is primarily based in Mongolia and China. He has published several books and articles about Asia, and has written travel stories about Mongolia in the South China Morning Post, Asian Art and Trouw.

Between 2000 and 2004, he served as adviser to Prime Minister of Mongolia Nambaryn Enkhbayar. He was also the adviser to his successful election campaign to become President of Mongolia in 2005.

He has published extensively on Nestorianism in Inner Mongolia which resulted in a Ph.D. at the Sinological Institute of Leiden University in 2007.

== Bibliography ==
- China, East Asia and the European Union (co-edited with Jan van der Harst), Leiden: Brill (2016)
- Early Christian Remains of Inner Mongolia: Discovery, Reconstruction and Appropriation, Leiden: Brill (July 2008)
- Yeti Jagers: Het geheime onderzoek naar de wilde mens van Centraal-Azië, Haarlem: Hollandia-Dominicus, (May 2008)
- Sprong naar het Westen: In het spoor van de Chinese ontdekker van Europa, Haarlem: Hollandia-Dominicus, (October 2005)
- Mongolië, Amsterdam: Koninklijk Instituut voor de Tropen; Den Haag: Novib; Brussel: 11.11.11, (2005)
- Steppeland: Berichten uit Mongolië, Haarlem: Hollandia-Dominicus, 2003. (Translated into Chinese and Czech)
- De Verloren Lotuskruisen, Haarlem: Altamira-Becht, 2002
