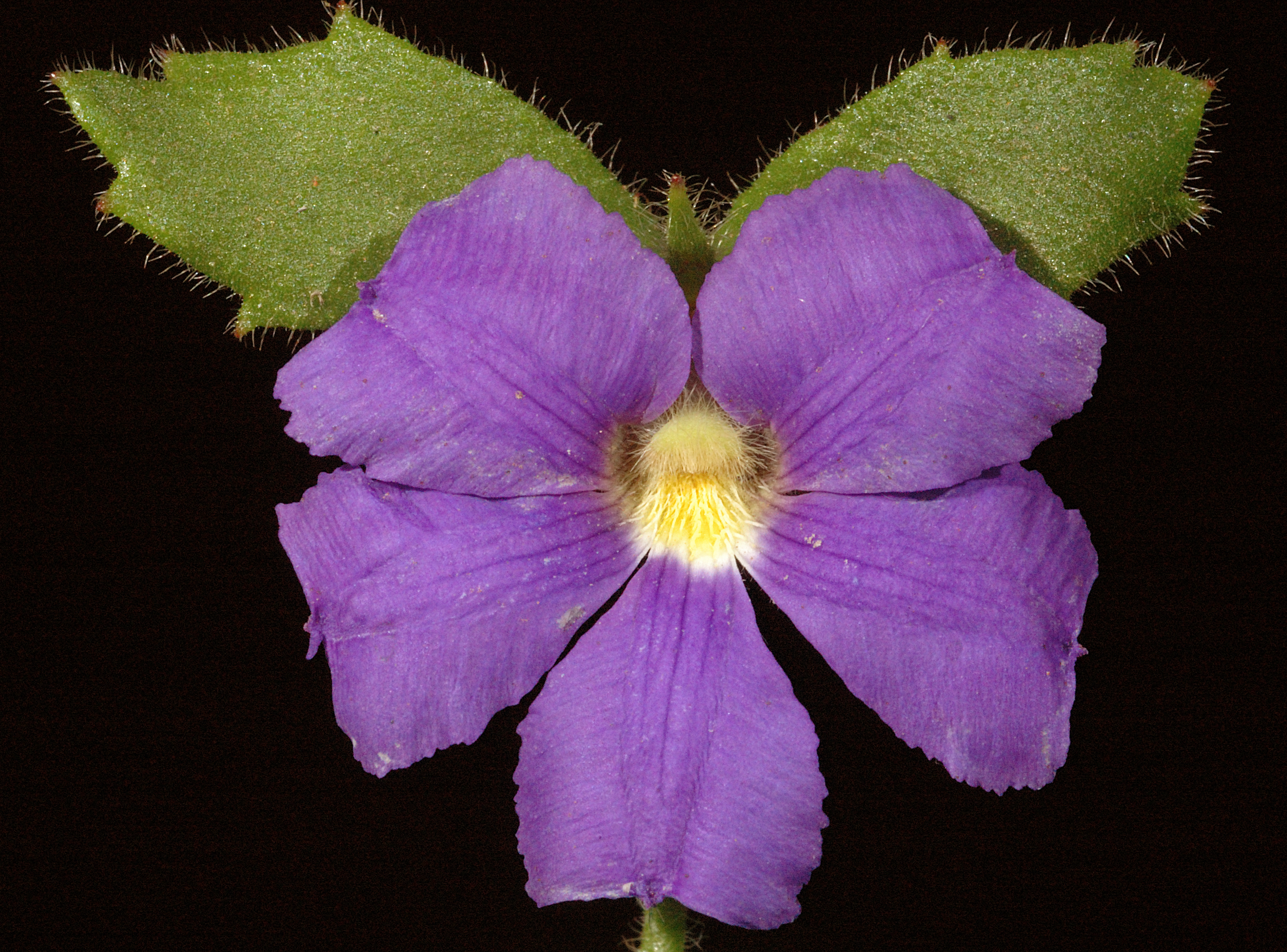

Scientific classification
- Kingdom: Plantae
- Clade: Tracheophytes
- Clade: Angiosperms
- Clade: Eudicots
- Clade: Asterids
- Order: Asterales
- Family: Goodeniaceae
- Genus: Scaevola
- Species: S. pilosa

Binomial name
- Scaevola pilosa Benth.
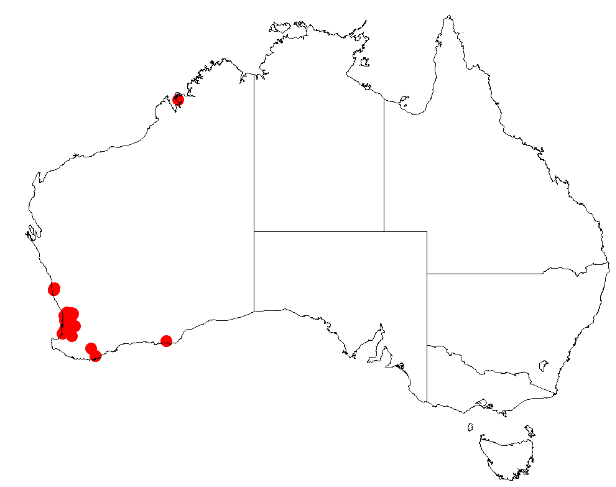
- Occurrence data from Australasian Virtual Herbarium

= Scaevola pilosa =

Species of flowering plant

Scaevola pilosa, commonly known as the hairy fan-flower, is a perennial herb in the family Goodeniaceae. It is endemic to the southwest of Western Australia.

== Description ==
Scaevola pilosa is an ascending to decumbent herb which grows to a height of 70 cm. It is hairy, with simple hairs to 1 mm long at 90°, together with minute, simple hairs and minute, glandular hairs. The lower leaves are toothed near the apex and ar 1.5–7.5 cm long by 0.5–3 cm wide. The upper leaves are smaller and stalkless. The inflorescence is a raceme about 50 cm long. The bracts are leafy. The stalk of the inflorescence is 2–6 cm long. The sepals are up to 2 mm long and free. The blue to mauve corolla is 10–25 mm long, with not appressed, white hairs on the outside, and is bearded on the inside. The fruit is ellipsoidal, about 5 mm long, and hairy.

It flowers in the months from September to December.

== Distribution ==
It is found in the IBRA regions of Geraldton Sandplains, the Swan Coastal Plain and the Jarrah Forest.

== Taxonomy ==
The species was formally described in 1837 by English botanist George Bentham. The specific epithet, pilosa, derives from the Latin, pilus, "hair" and is used in Botanical Latin to describe the plant as being "covered with long soft distinct hairs"
