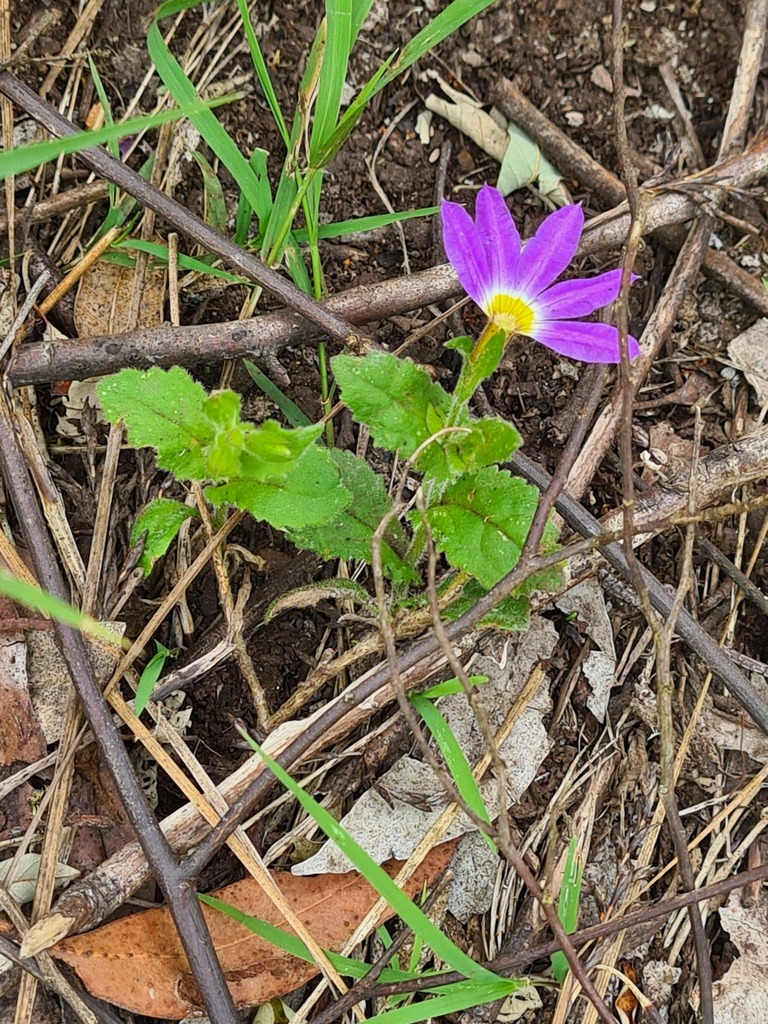
- In Porongurup National Park

Scientific classification
- Kingdom: Plantae
- Clade: Tracheophytes
- Clade: Angiosperms
- Clade: Eudicots
- Clade: Asterids
- Order: Asterales
- Family: Goodeniaceae
- Genus: Scaevola
- Species: S. auriculata

Binomial name
- Scaevola auriculata Benth.
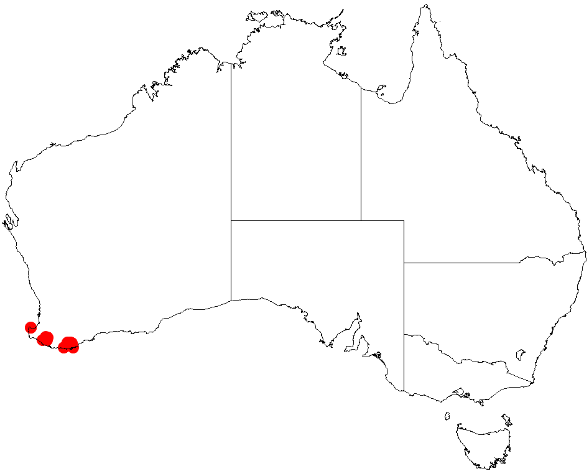
- Occurrence data from Australasian Virtual Herbarium

Synonyms
- Lobelia auriculata (Benth.) Kuntze; Molkenboeria semiamplexicaulis auct. non (DC.) de Vriese: Vriese, W.H. de (1854)

= Scaevola auriculata =

Species of shrub

Scaevola auriculata is a species of flowering plant in the family Goodeniaceae and is endemic to a small area in the south-west of Western Australia. It is a low-lying, straggling or ascending perennial herb with stem-clasping, elliptic to oblong and toothed leaves, blue or purple flowers and smooth oval fruit.

== Description ==
Scaevola auriculata is a low-lying, straggling or ascending perennial herb with stems up to 70 cm (28 in) long and covered with loose hairs. The leaves are sessile, stem-clasping, elliptic to oblong and toothed, 25–75 mm (0.98–2.95 in) long and 15–35 mm (0.59–1.38 in) wide. The flowers arranged in loose racemes with leaf-like bracts 5–10 mm (0.20–0.39 in) long and elliptic bracteoles 8–14 mm (0.31–0.55 in) long. The sepals are broadly egg-shaped, up to 0.5 mm (0.020 in) long and joined at the base. The petals are blue or purple, 15–27 mm (0.59–1.06 in) long, covered with loose hairs on the outside and bearded inside. The ovary has two locules with a pale brown beard. Flowering occurs from September to January, and the fruit is oval, 2.5–4 mm (0.098–0.157 in) long, smooth and covered with soft hairs.

== Taxonomy ==
Scaevola auriculata was first formally described in 1868 by George Bentham in his Flora Australiensis from specimens collected by James Drummmond. The specific epithet (auriculata) means 'auriculate', referring to the leaves.

== Distribution and habitat ==
This species of Scaevola is found in woodland in and around the Porongurup Range in the Jarrah Forest bioregion of south-western Western Australia

== Conservation status ==
Scaevola auriculata is listed as "not threatened" by the Government of Western Australia Department of Biodiversity, Conservation and Attractions.
