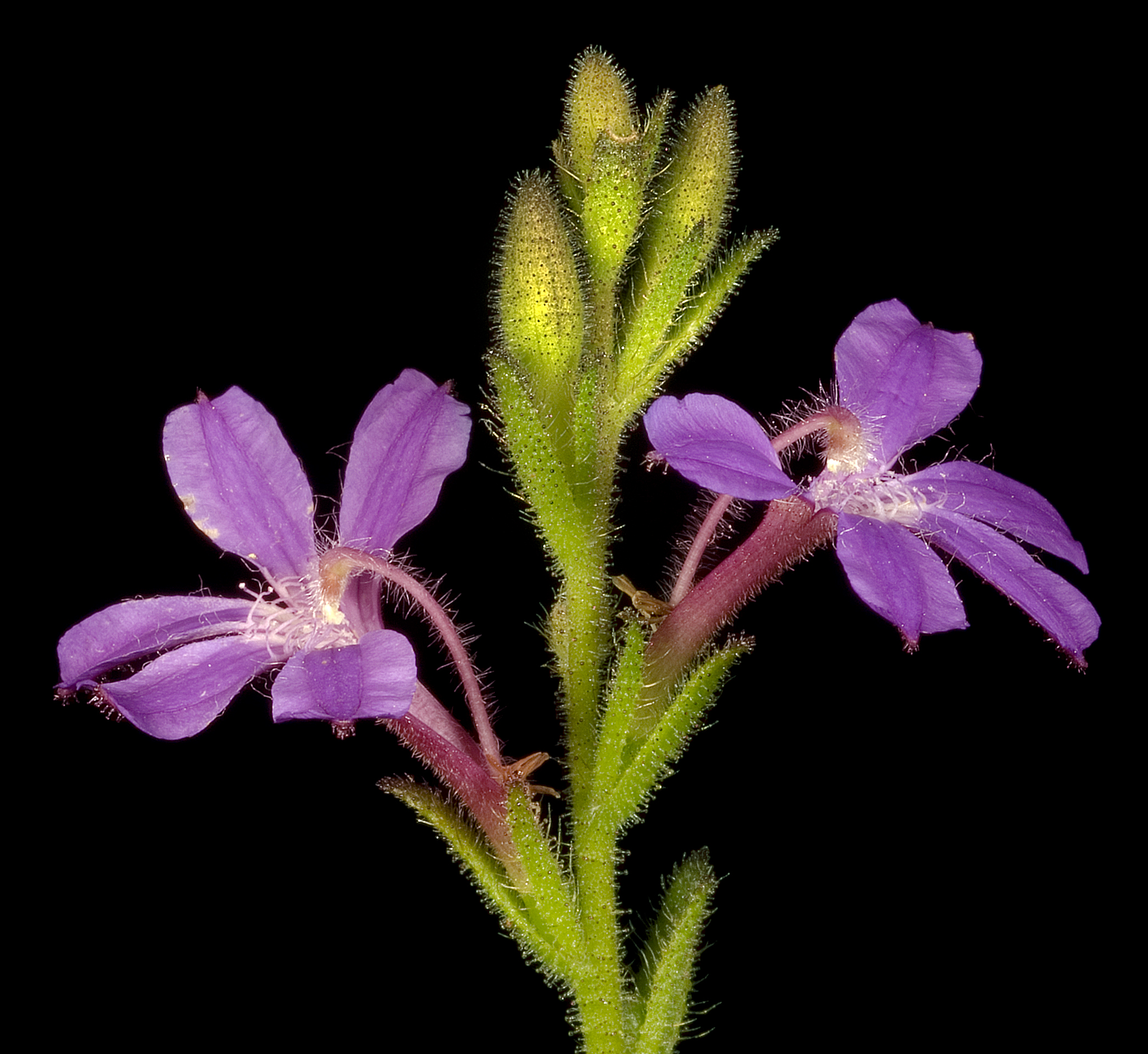

Scientific classification
- Kingdom: Plantae
- Clade: Tracheophytes
- Clade: Angiosperms
- Clade: Eudicots
- Clade: Asterids
- Order: Asterales
- Family: Goodeniaceae
- Genus: Scaevola
- Species: S. glandulifera

Binomial name
- Scaevola glandulifera DC.
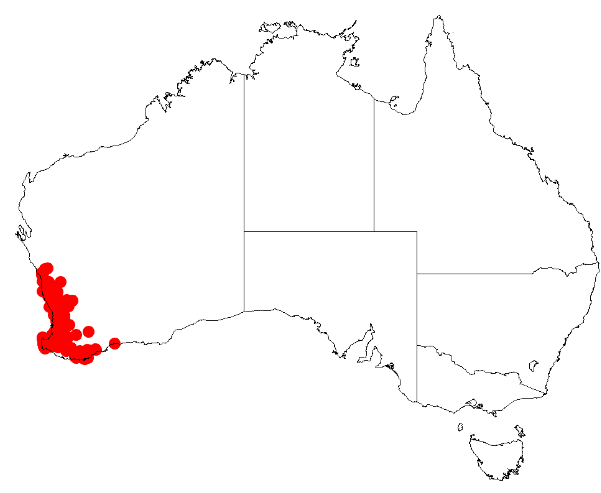
- Occurrence data from Australasian Virtual Herbarium

Synonyms
- Lobelia glandulifera Kuntze; Merkusia glandulifera de Vriese; Scaevola rufa de Vriese

= Scaevola glandulifera =

Species of shrub

Scaevola glandulifera, the viscid hand-flower, is a shrub in the family Goodeniaceae, endemic to Western Australia.

== Description ==
Scaevola glandulifera is an erect shrub which grows to a height of 50 cm. The stems are not ribbed. The leaves are stalkless, sometimes smooth edged, sometimes toothed, with a leaf blade which is 2-9 cm long and 1-10 mm wide. The flowers occur in terminal spikes. The corolla is 10-30 mm long, and has short hairs both simple and glandular with occasionally longer, stiff, yellow hairs on the outside. It is bearded inside and a deep blue-purple colour. The ovary has two locules. The cup which holds the style (indusium) is 1.5-3 mm wide, and hairy on both the inner and outer surfaces. The fruit is obovoid and up to 4 mm long and can be with or without a hairy surface.

It flowers from August to December, January.

== Distribution & habitat ==
In Western AustraliaScaevola glandulifera is found in the IBRA bioregions of Geraldton Sandplains, Swan Coastal Plain, Avon Wheatbelt, Jarrah Forest, Warren and Esperance Plains (or in the South West Botanical Province.

== Taxonomy ==
Scaevola glandulifera was first described in 1839 by Augustin Pyramus de Candolle in Prodromus Systematis Naturalis Regni Vegetabilis.

== Etymology ==
The genus name, Scaevola, is Latin, a diminutive of scaeva, the left-handed, referring to the left-handed Roman, Gaius Mucius Scaevola, made famous by Livy, the flower being so like a hand. The specific epithet, glandulifera, comes from the Latin, glandula (gland) and ferre (carry/bear), giving "gland-bearing".
