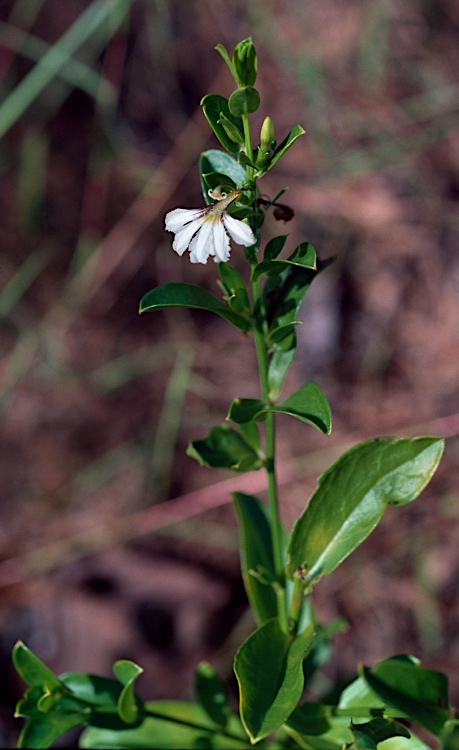
- In Kakadu National Park

Scientific classification
- Kingdom: Plantae
- Clade: Tracheophytes
- Clade: Angiosperms
- Clade: Eudicots
- Clade: Asterids
- Order: Asterales
- Family: Goodeniaceae
- Genus: Scaevola
- Species: S. angulata

Binomial name
- Scaevola angulata R.Br.

= Scaevola angulata =

Species of flowering plant

Scaevola angulata is a species of flowering plant in the family Goodeniaceae and is endemic to the Northern Territory, Australia. It is a straggling, spreading perennial shrub with more or less sessile, egg-shaped to narrowly oblong leaves and spikes of white to pale blue flowers.

== Description ==
Scaevola angulata is a straggling, spreading, intricately branched perennial shrub that typically grows to a height of up to 1 m (3 ft 3 in) high and has striated stems. The leaves are more or less sessile, egg-shaped to narrowly oblong, mostly 15–30 mm (0.59–1.18 in) long and 5–10 mm (0.20–0.39 in) wide, sometimes with a short petiole. The flowers are borne on terminal spikes up to 150 mm (5.9 in) long with leafy bracts at the base. The sepals are triangular, about 1 mm (0.039 in) long and joined forming a bell-shaped tube. The petals are 11–20 mm (0.43–0.79 in) long, white to pale blue and bearded inside, sometimes with yellow in the throat. Flowering occurs in most months, and the fruit is elliptic, 4 mm (0.16 in) long.

== Taxonomy ==
Scaevola angulata was first formally described in 1810 by Robert Brown in his Prodromus Florae Novae Hollandiae. The specific epithet (angulata) means 'angled' or 'angular'.

== Distribution and habitat ==
This species of Scaevola grows on damp, sandy soils derived from sandstone in near-coastal areas, in open forest in the Top End of the Northern Territory and on Melville Island.

== Conservation status ==
Scaevola angulata is listed as of "least concern" under the Northern Territory Territory Parks and Wildlife Conservation Act.
