= Scaevola glutinosa =

Scientific classification
- Kingdom: Plantae
- Clade: Embryophytes
- Clade: Tracheophytes
- Clade: Spermatophytes
- Clade: Angiosperms
- Clade: Eudicots
- Clade: Asterids
- Order: Asterales
- Family: Goodeniaceae
- Genus: Scaevola
- Species: S. glutinosa

Binomial name
- Scaevola glutinosa Carolin

Species of flowering plant

Scaevola glutinosa is a species of flowering plant in the family Goodeniaceae. It is a small, spreading shrub with fan-shaped blue flowers, toothed, oval-shaped leaves and grows in Queensland, Australia.

== Description ==
Scaevola glutinosa is a small, spreading sub-shrub to 70 cm (28 in) high, sticky stems, soft simple hairs, toothed oval-shaped leaves, sessile, sometimes almost stem-clasping, 21–68 mm (0.83–2.68 in) long and 6–26 mm (0.24–1.02 in) wide. The blue flowers are in spikes up to 12 cm (4.7 in) long, bracts elliptic to egg-shaped, corolla 14–24 mm (0.55–0.94 in) long, hairy on the outer surface, bearded on the inside and the wings up to 10 mm (0.39 in) wide. Flowering occurs from February to September and the fruit is cylinder-shaped, 4–6 mm (0.16–0.24 in) long, wrinkled and covered in soft hairs.

== Taxonomy and naming ==
Scaevola glutinosa was first formally described in 1990 by Roger Charles Carolin and the description was published in Telopea. The specific epithet (glutinosa) means "sticky".

== Distribution and habitat ==
This scaevola grows mostly on limestone and occurs between the Mt Isa highlands and the Great Dividing Range.
