= Scaevola archeriana =

Scientific classification
- Kingdom: Plantae
- Clade: Tracheophytes
- Clade: Angiosperms
- Clade: Eudicots
- Clade: Asterids
- Order: Asterales
- Family: Goodeniaceae
- Genus: Scaevola
- Species: S. archeriana

Binomial name
- Scaevola archeriana L.W.Sage
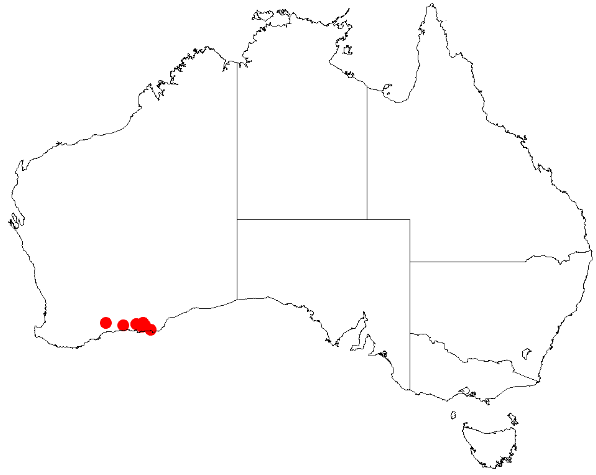
- Distribution map

Species of flowering plant

Scaevola archeriana is a species of flowering plant in the family Goodeniaceae and is endemic to the south of Western Australia. It is an erect, multi-stemmed herb with toothed leaves at the base of the plant and on the stems, mauve flowers arranged in thyrses or racemes and tuberculate fruit.

== Description ==
Scaevola archeriana is an erect shrub with many stems, up to 45 cm (18 in) high, with striated stems. The leaves at the base of the plants are egg-shaped with the narrower end towards the base and toothed, about 8 mm (0.31 in) long and 3 mm (0.12 in) wide. Its stem leaves are more or less triangular, usually coarsely toothed and serrated, up to about 10 mm (0.39 in) long, about 5 mm (0.20 in) wide and hairy. The flowers are arranged in thyrses or racemes on peduncles 12–22 mm (0.47–0.87 in) long with triangular bracts and bracteoles up to 2 mm (0.079 in) long. The sepals are more or less triangular up to 1.3 mm (0.051 in) long and joined at the base. The petals are mauve, 12–16 mm (0.47–0.63 in) long, densely bearded inside and hairy outside, the lobes about 5 mm (0.20 in) long and wings 0.2–0.9 mm (0.0079–0.0354 in) wide. The fruit is oval to elliptic and tuberculate, about 6.5 mm (0.26 in) long.

== Taxonomy and naming ==
Scaevola archeriana was first formally described in 2004 by Leigh William Sage in the journal Telopea from specimens collected by William Archer in the Esperance Plains bioregion in 1995. The specific epithet (archeriana) means honours the collector of the type specimens.

== Distribution and habitat ==
This species of Scaevola grows in sandy and sandy clay loam soils on sandplains and road verges north-east of Esperance in the south of Western Australia.
