= Scaevola verticillata =

Conservation status
- Vulnerable (IUCN 3.1)

Scientific classification
- Kingdom: Plantae
- Clade: Tracheophytes
- Clade: Angiosperms
- Clade: Eudicots
- Clade: Asterids
- Order: Asterales
- Family: Goodeniaceae
- Genus: Scaevola
- Species: S. verticillata

Binomial name
- Scaevola verticillata Leenh.

Species of flowering plant

Scaevola verticillata is a species of plant in the family Goodeniaceae. It is endemic to Borneo where it is confined to Sarawak.
