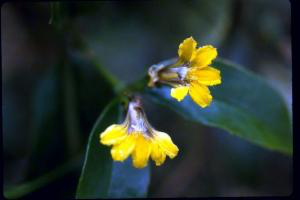

Scientific classification
- Kingdom: Plantae
- Clade: Embryophytes
- Clade: Tracheophytes
- Clade: Spermatophytes
- Clade: Angiosperms
- Clade: Eudicots
- Clade: Asterids
- Order: Asterales
- Family: Goodeniaceae
- Genus: Scaevola
- Species: S. enantophylla

Binomial name
- Scaevola enantophylla F.Muell.
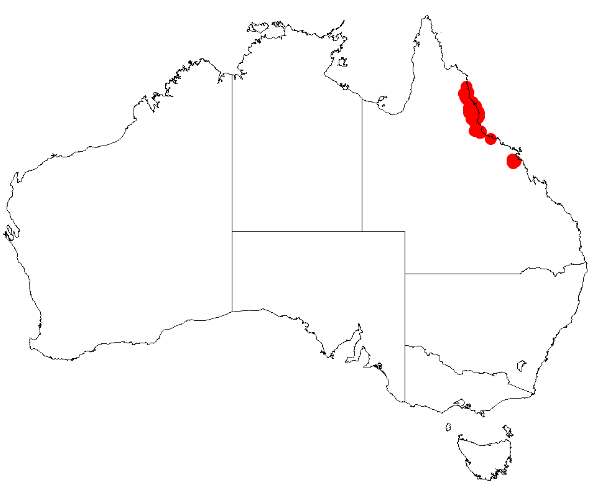
- Occurrence data from Australasian Virtual Herbarium

Synonyms
- Lobelia enantophylla (F.Muell.) Kuntze; Scaevola scandens F.M.Bailey

= Scaevola enantophylla =

Climbing fan-flower

Species of flowering plant

Scaevola enantophylla, commonly known as climbing fan-flower,is a species of flowering plant in the family Goodeniaceae and is endemic to Queensland. It is a scrambling vine with yellow fan-shaped flowers, and the only species in the genus with leaves arranged in opposite pairs.

== Description ==
Scaevola enantophylla is a scrambling vine up to 4 m (13 ft) long, it may be smooth or with soft, short hairs. The leaves are egg-shaped to lance-shaped, finely toothed, arranged in opposite pairs, 4–15 cm (1.6–5.9 in) long, 20–60 mm (0.79–2.36 in) wide, tapering to a point on a short petiole. The fan-shaped flowers are borne in cymes in leaf axils on a peduncle up to 16 mm (0.63 in) long, triangular bracteoles usually up to 1 mm (0.039 in) long, and each flower on a pedicel up to 5 mm (0.20 in) long. The yellow corolla is 14–20 mm (0.55–0.79 in) long, smooth on the outside, thickly bearded on the inside, and the wings up to 1.5 mm (0.059 in) wide. Flowering occurs from July to November and the fruit is narrowly egg-shaped, black, 10–12 mm (0.39–0.47 in) long, smooth or with occasional hairs.

== Taxonomy ==
Scaevola enantophylla was first formally described in 1873 by Ferdinand von Mueller and the description was published in Fragmenta Phytographiae Australiae.

== Distribution and habitat ==
Climbing fan-flower grows near forests on the east coast of Queensland.
