= Scaevola angustata =

Scientific classification
- Kingdom: Plantae
- Clade: Tracheophytes
- Clade: Angiosperms
- Clade: Eudicots
- Clade: Asterids
- Order: Asterales
- Family: Goodeniaceae
- Genus: Scaevola
- Species: S. angustata

Binomial name
- Scaevola angustata Carolin
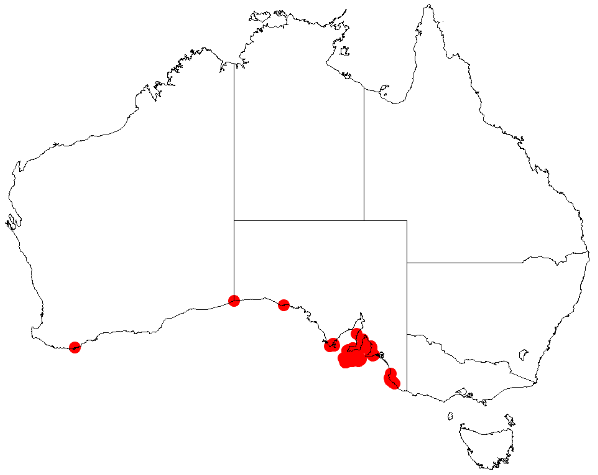
- Distribution map

Species of flowering plant

Scaevola angustata is a species of flowering plant belonging to the family Goodeniaceae. It has pale blue to purple flowers and is endemic to South Australia.

== Description ==
Scaevola angustata is a shrub with ascending or horizontal stems, up to 1 m (3 ft 3 in) high, glabrous, and sticky when young. The leaves are elliptic to oblong-lance shaped, 2–10 cm (0.79–3.94 in) long, 2–40 mm (0.079–1.575 in) wide, margins toothed and sessile. The flowers are in terminal spikes up to 9.5 cm (3.7 in) long, bracts 5–24 mm (0.20–0.94 in) long and linear shaped. The corolla 11–20 mm (0.43–0.79 in) long, mostly sticky and smooth on the outer surface, light blue or purple, and the wings 1 mm (0.039 in) wide. Flowering occurs mostly from August to November and the fruit is broadly egg-shaped, up to 4 mm (0.16 in) long, warty to wrinkled, more or less ribbed, glabrous or with occasional hairs.

== Taxonomy and naming ==
Scaevola angustata was first formally described in 1986 by Roger Charles Carolin and the description was published in Flora of South Australia. The specific epithet (angustata) means "narrowed".

== Distribution and habitat ==
This species of Scaevola grows on limestone, sand dunes and heath near the coast of south-eastern South Australia.
