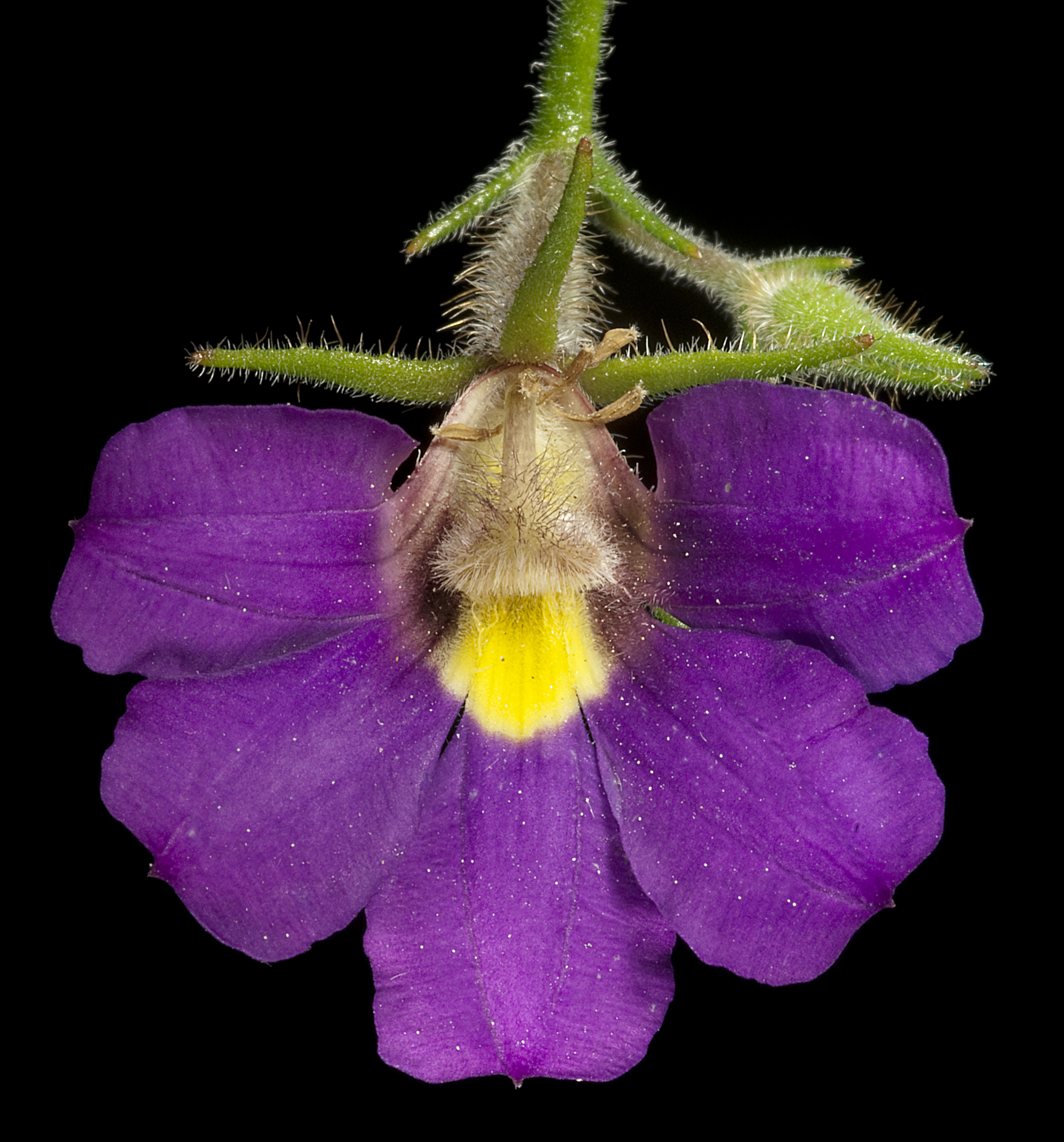

Scientific classification
- Kingdom: Plantae
- Clade: Tracheophytes
- Clade: Angiosperms
- Clade: Eudicots
- Clade: Asterids
- Order: Asterales
- Family: Goodeniaceae
- Genus: Scaevola
- Species: S. phlebopetala

Binomial name
- Scaevola phlebopetala F.Muell.
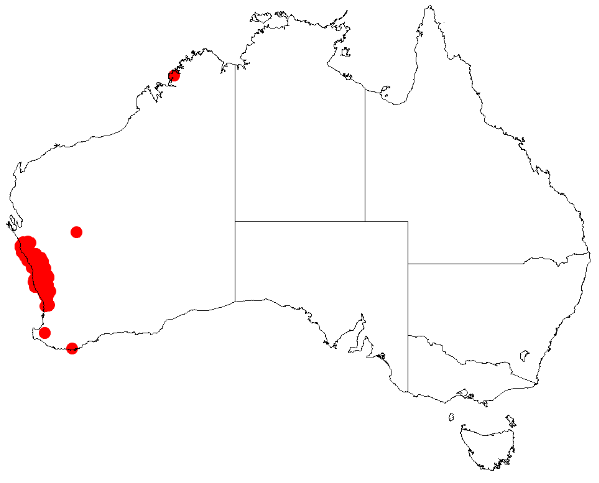
- Occurrence data from Australasian Virtual Herbarium

Synonyms
- Lobelia phlebopetala (F.Muell.) Kuntze

= Scaevola phlebopetala =

Species of flowering plant

Scaevola phlebopetala, commonly known as velvet fanflower, is a herb in the family Goodeniaceae and is endemic to Western Australia.

== Description ==
Scaevola phlebopetala is a generally prostrate herb, with stems growing to 50 cm. The stems are bristly, with hairs at 90° and sometimes rough to the touch. The leaves are stalkless and usually toothed with the leaf blade being from 1.2 to 10 cm long by 3 to 17 mm wide. The flowers occur in racemes which are up to 30 cm long. The inflorescence stalk is 2–4.5 cm long and curved. The sepals are linear, 4–14 mm long, and not joined. The corolla is from 10–27 mm long, and has both short, white hairs and long, stiff, yellow hairs on the outside, and is densely bearded on the inside. It is deep purple and yellow in the throat. The fruit is obovoid, striated, warty, hairy and 5–6 mm long. It flowers from June to October.

== Distribution and habitat ==
It is found in southwest Western Australia growing in sandy heaths.

== Taxonomy ==
It was first named and described by Ferdinand von Mueller in 1860. The specific epithet, phlebopetala, derives from the Greek, phlebos ("vein") and the Latin, petalum ("petal") to give an adjective describing the plant as having "veined petals".
