= Scaevola muluensis =

Conservation status
- Vulnerable (IUCN 2.3)

Scientific classification
- Kingdom: Plantae
- Clade: Tracheophytes
- Clade: Angiosperms
- Clade: Eudicots
- Clade: Asterids
- Order: Asterales
- Family: Goodeniaceae
- Genus: Scaevola
- Species: S. muluensis

Binomial name
- Scaevola muluensis K.M.Wong

Species of flowering plant

Scaevola muluensis is a species of plant in the family Goodeniaceae. It is endemic to Borneo where it is confined to Sarawak. This plant was first described in 1993 by the botanist Khoon Meng Wong in the journal Sandakania.
