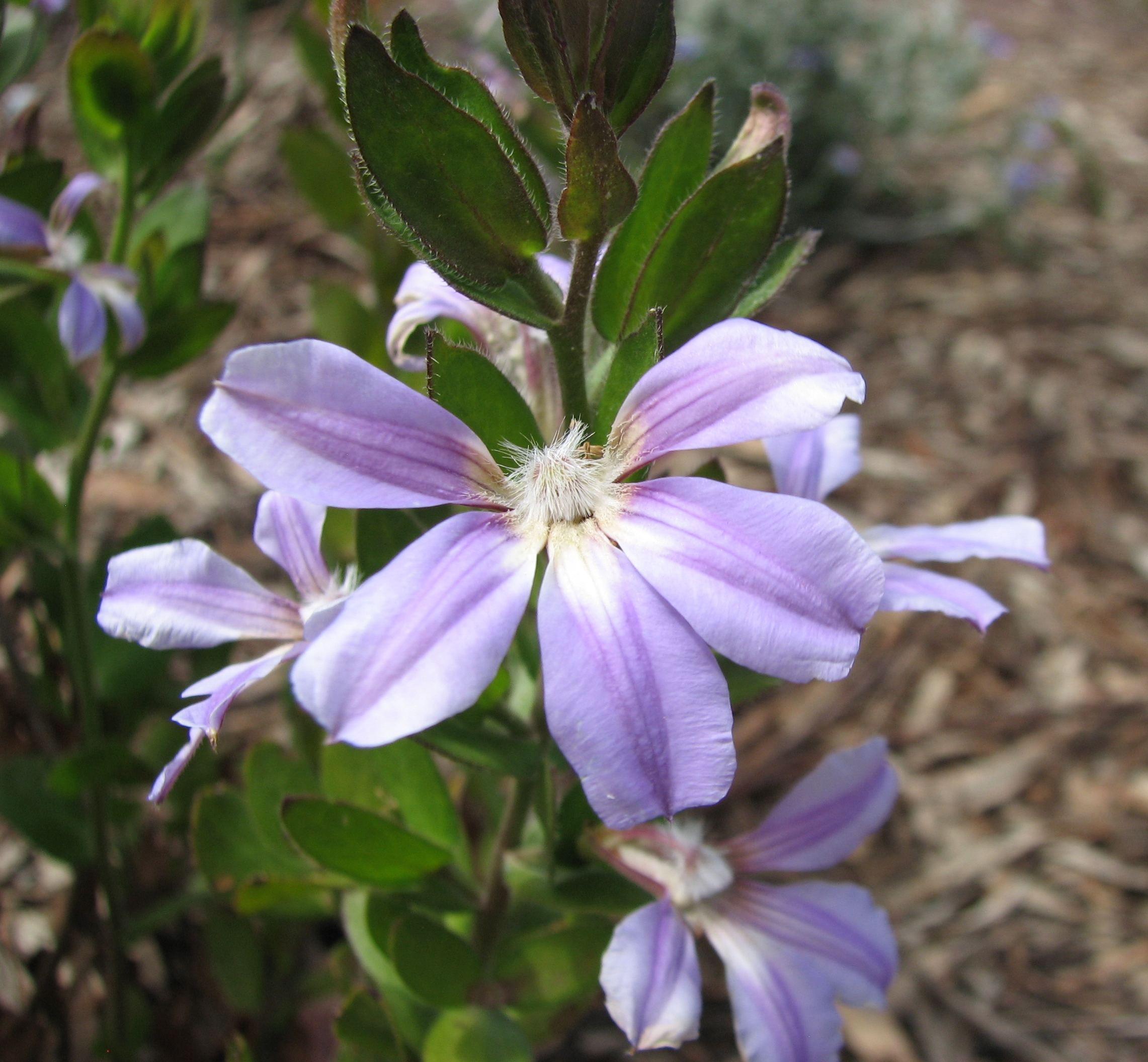

Scientific classification
- Kingdom: Plantae
- Clade: Tracheophytes
- Clade: Angiosperms
- Clade: Eudicots
- Clade: Asterids
- Order: Asterales
- Family: Goodeniaceae
- Genus: Scaevola
- Species: S. platyphylla

Binomial name
- Scaevola platyphylla Lindl.
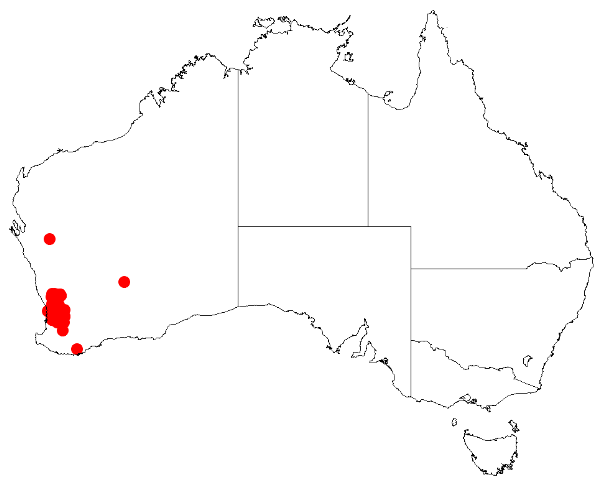
- Occurrence data from Australasian Virtual Herbarium

Synonyms
- Lobelia platyphylla (Labill.) Kuntze; Molkenboeria platyphylla (Lindl.) de Vriese; Molkenboeria semiamplexicaulis (DC.) de Vriese; Scaevola semiamplexicaulis DC.

= Scaevola platyphylla =

Species of shrub

Scaevola platyphylla, commonly known as broad-leaved fanflower, is a shrub in the family Goodeniaceae. It is endemic to the south-west of Western Australia. Plants grow to between 0.3 and 1.3 metres high and have blue to purple flowers that appear between August and January in their native range.

The species was formally described in 1839 by English botanist John Lindley in A sketch of the vegetation of the Swan River Colony.

== Gallery ==
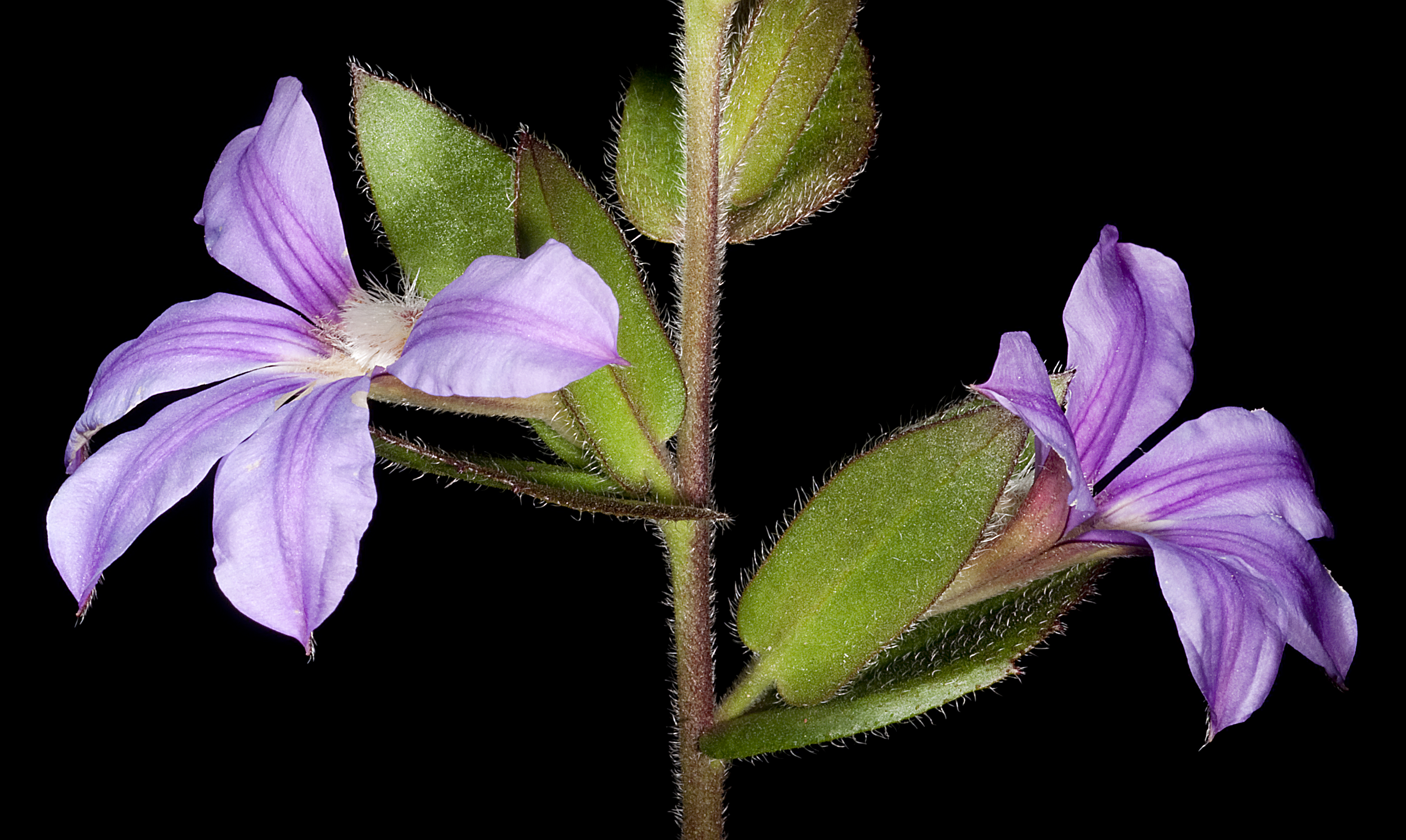

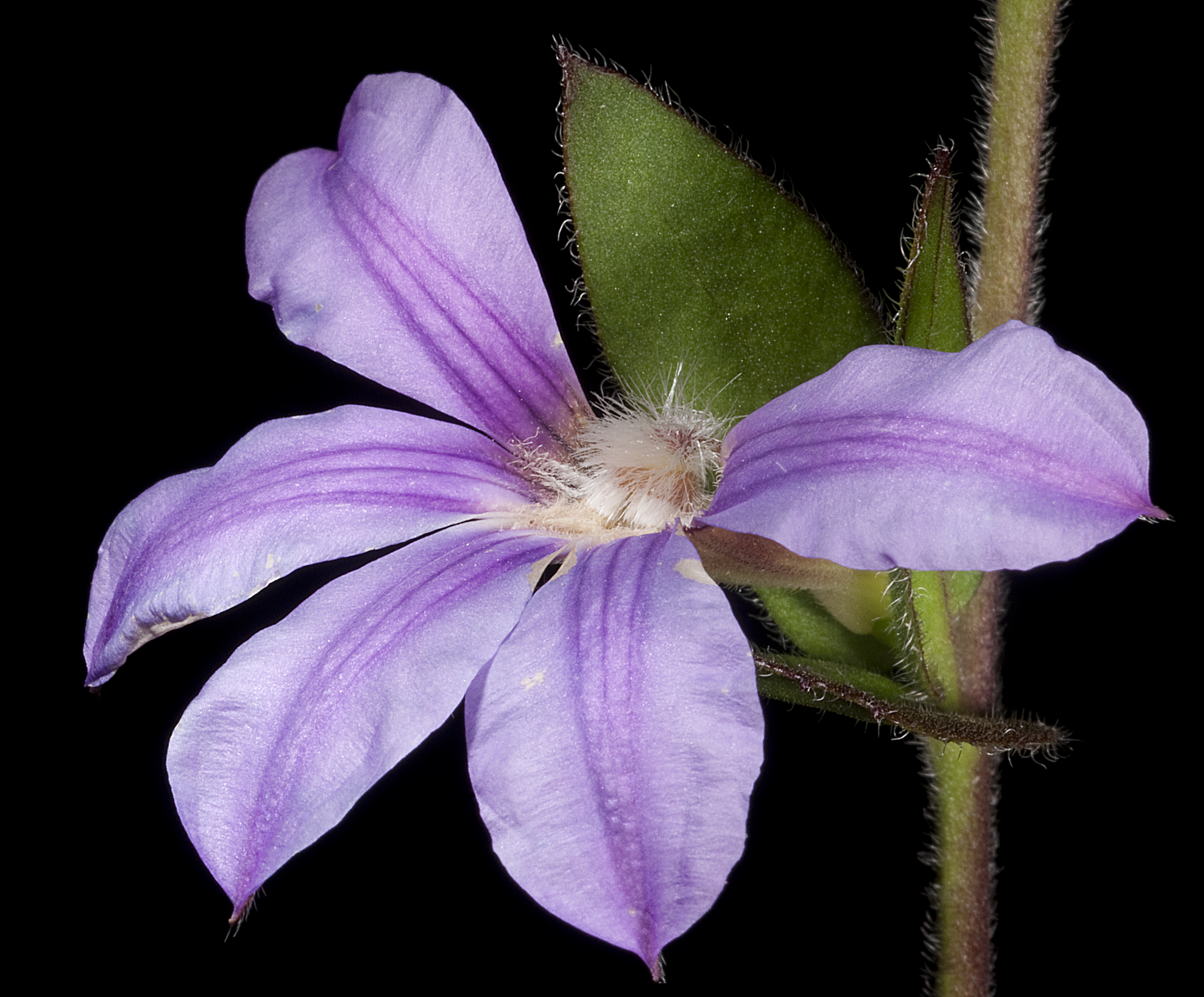
