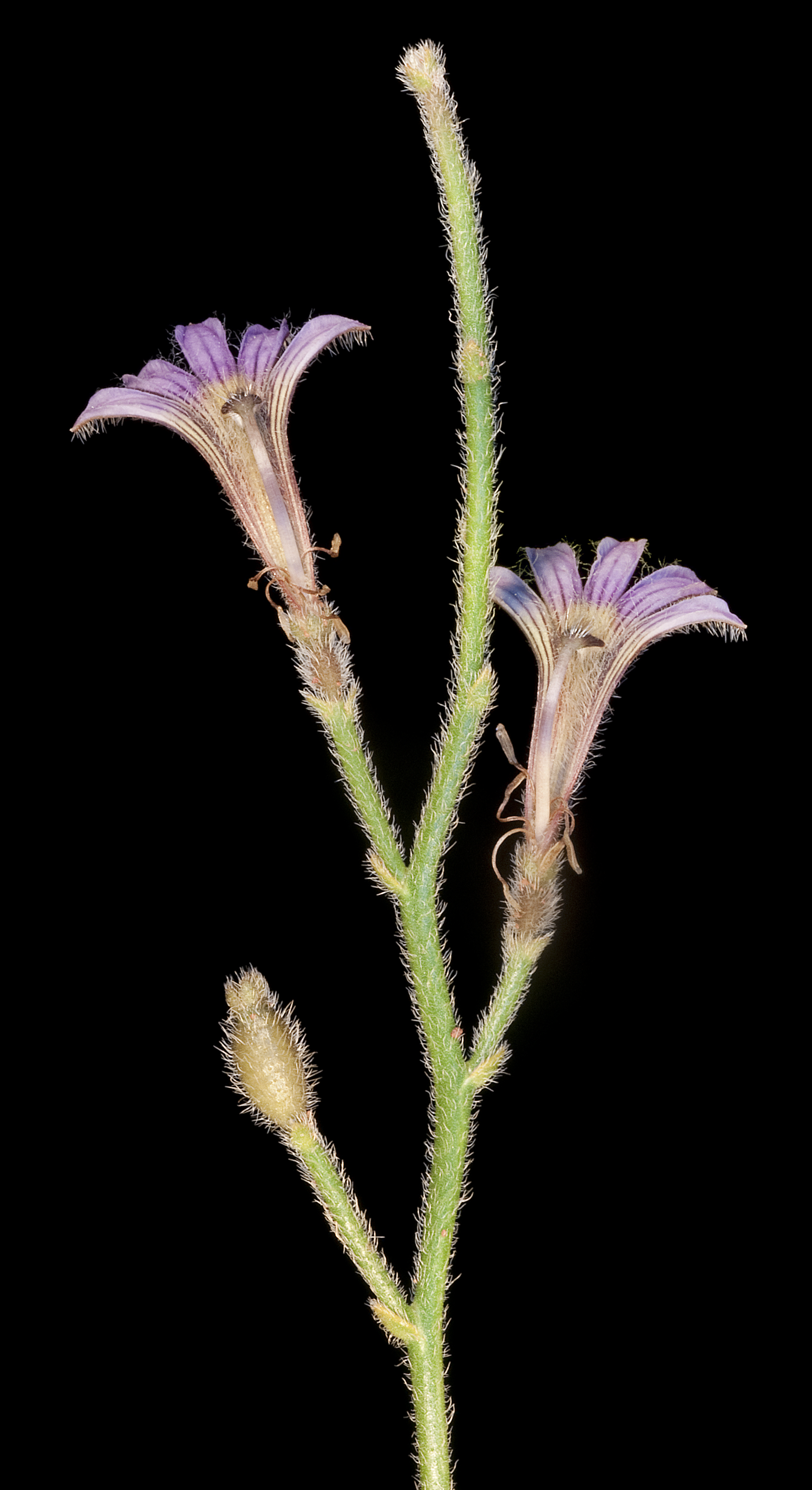

Scientific classification
- Kingdom: Plantae
- Clade: Tracheophytes
- Clade: Angiosperms
- Clade: Eudicots
- Clade: Asterids
- Order: Asterales
- Family: Goodeniaceae
- Genus: Scaevola
- Species: S. parvifolia

Binomial name
- Scaevola parvifolia F.Muell. ex Benth.
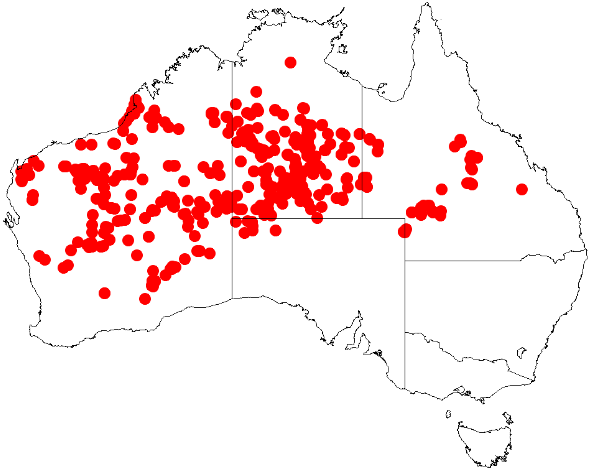
- Occurrence data from AVH

Synonyms
- Lobelia parvifolia Kuntze; Scaevola daleana Blakely

= Scaevola parvifolia =

Species of plant

Scaevola parvifolia (common name - camel weed) is an erect, many stemmed perennial in the family Goodeniaceae, which is native to Western Australia, the Northern Territory, Queensland and South Australia. It grows to a height of 0.6 m, and its blue-purple flowers may be seen from March to October.

== Description ==
Scaevola parvifolia is an, erect, many-stemmed perennial growing to 60 cm tall, with hairs at 90°; stems scarcely striate. The basal leaves have no stalks, are linear to lanceolate, and are entire, with leaf blades 18–35 mm long by 3–6 mm wide. The leaves on the stems, however, are ovate to linear, with blades which are 1.5 to 27 mm long. The inflorescences are thyrses (compound inflorescences ending in a vegetative bud and with mixed types of branching with the main axis bearing several or many lateral cymes), which are up to 40 cm long. The bracts are leafy and the flower stalk is up to 6.5 cm long. The sepals are triangular and free (or join only at the base). The blue to white corolla is 13–32 mm long, with hairs on the outside, and bearded inside. The fruit is ellipsoidal is 4–8 mm long, is hairy, has striations, and tubercles (small wart-like outgrowths).

== Distribution and habitat ==
It is found in the arid regions of Western Australia, central Australia and Queensland, growing on red sand, clay or loamy soils, on sandplains & dunes.

== Taxonomy and etymology ==
It was first described and named by Ferdinand von Mueller in 1868, and its specific epithet, parvifolia, is derived from the Latin, parvus ("small") and folium ("leaf") thereby giving an adjective which describes the plant as "small-leaved".

== Gallery ==
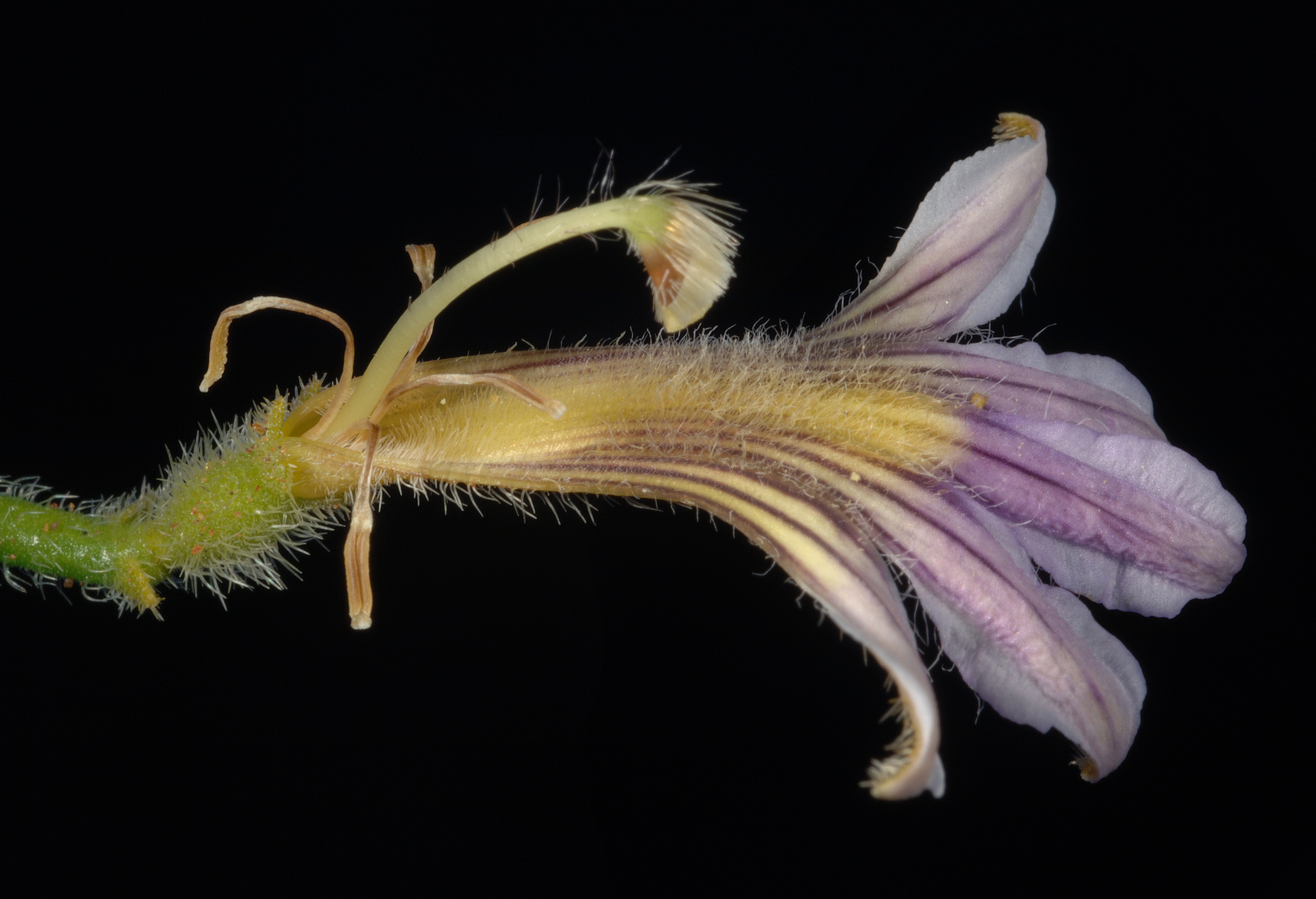

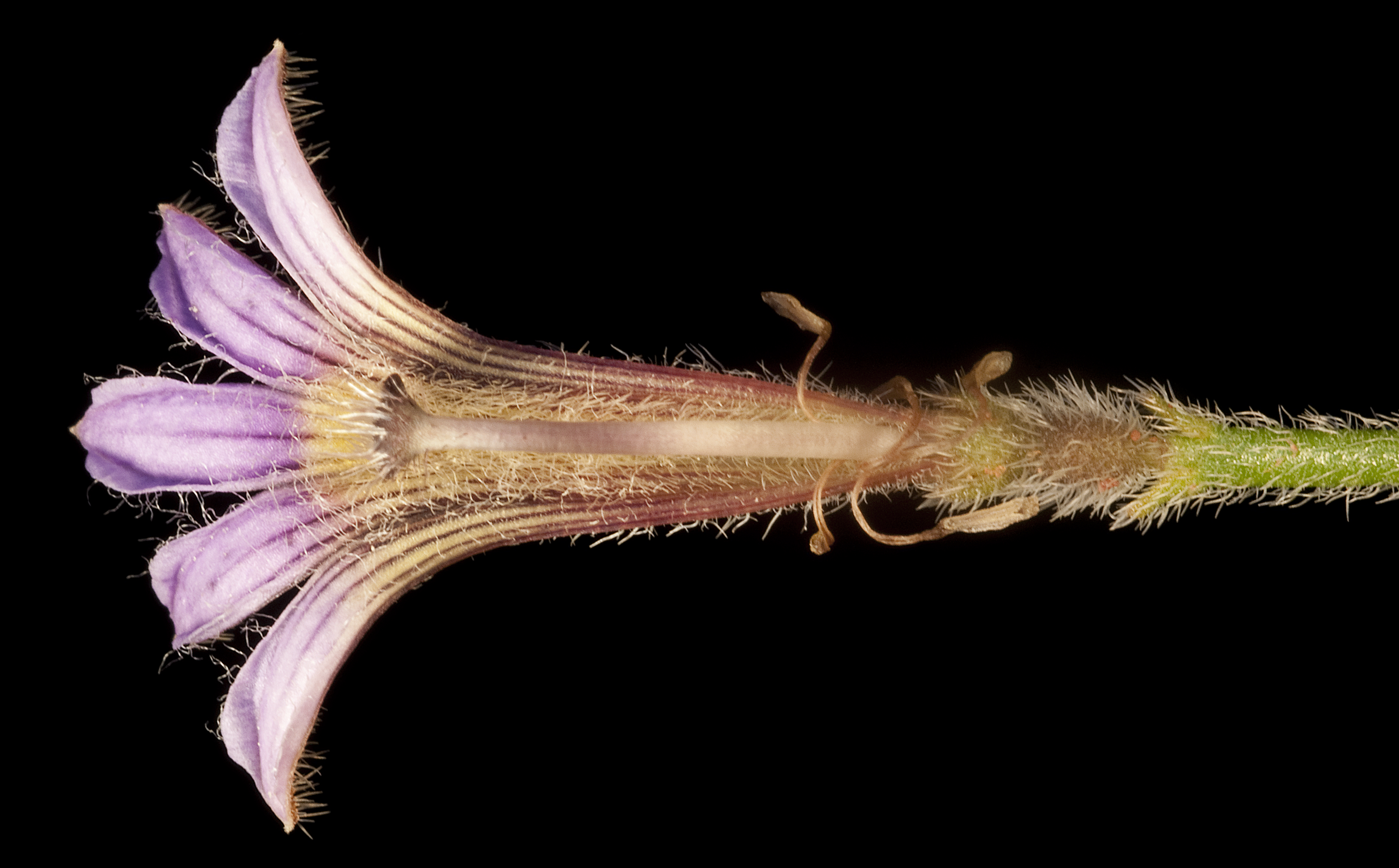
