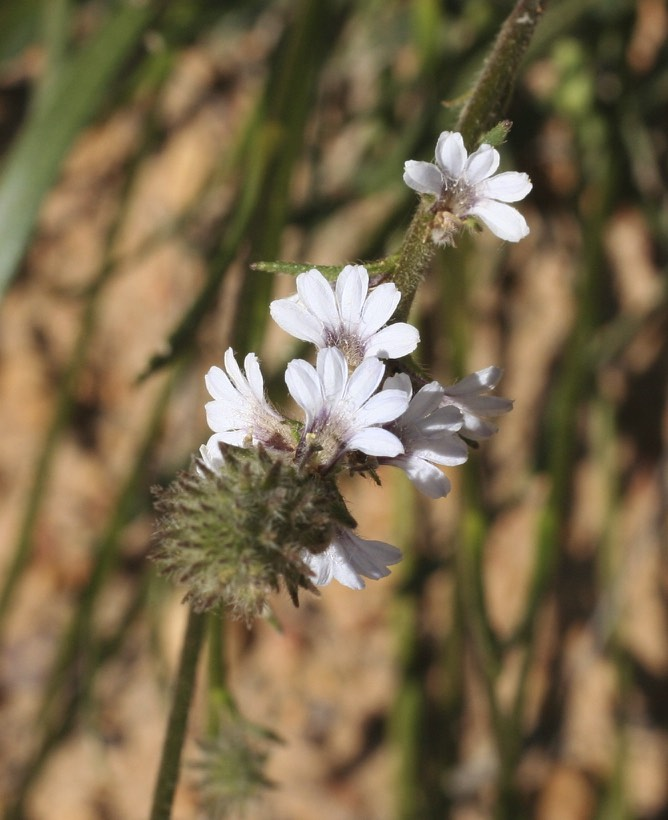

Scientific classification
- Kingdom: Plantae
- Clade: Tracheophytes
- Clade: Angiosperms
- Clade: Eudicots
- Clade: Asterids
- Order: Asterales
- Family: Goodeniaceae
- Genus: Scaevola
- Species: S. virgata

Binomial name
- Scaevola virgata Carolin

= Scaevola virgata =

Species of flowering plant

Scaevola virgata is a species of flowering plant in the family Goodeniaceae. It is a perennial, much-branched, small shrub has white to blue flowers and endemic to Western Australia.

== Description ==
Scaevola virgata is a perennial herb or subshrub to 0.1–0.4 m (3.9 in – 1 ft 3.7 in) high with needle-shaped stems covered in long, soft, fine hairs. The leaves are oblong-lance to linear shaped, wide at the base, margins smooth or toothed, 2–6 cm (0.79–2.36 in) wide, 3–8 mm (0.12–0.31 in) long, sessile and more or less stem-clasping at the base. The flowers are borne at the end of branches on scapose spikes up to 10 cm (3.9 in) long, pedicel 2–3 mm (0.079–0.118 in) long with glandular hairs. The white to pale blue corolla is 5–8 mm (0.20–0.31 in) long with fine hairs on the outer surface, occasional hairs on the inside and the bracts oval-shaped and 3–27 mm (0.12–1.06 in) long. The central petals are 2.8–4.5 mm (0.11–0.18 in) long and outer petals 2.5–4.3 mm (0.098–0.169 in) long. Flowering occurs from July to November and the fruit is globe to cylinder-shaped, up to 3 mm (0.12 in) in diameter, wrinkled and smooth.

== Taxonomy and naming ==
Scaevola virgata was first formally described in 1990 by Roger Carolin and the description was published in Telopea. The specific epithet (virgata) means "long and slender".

== Distribution and habitat ==
This scaevola grows in heath or scrubland in rocky soils on the Ogilvie Plains and Watheroo.
