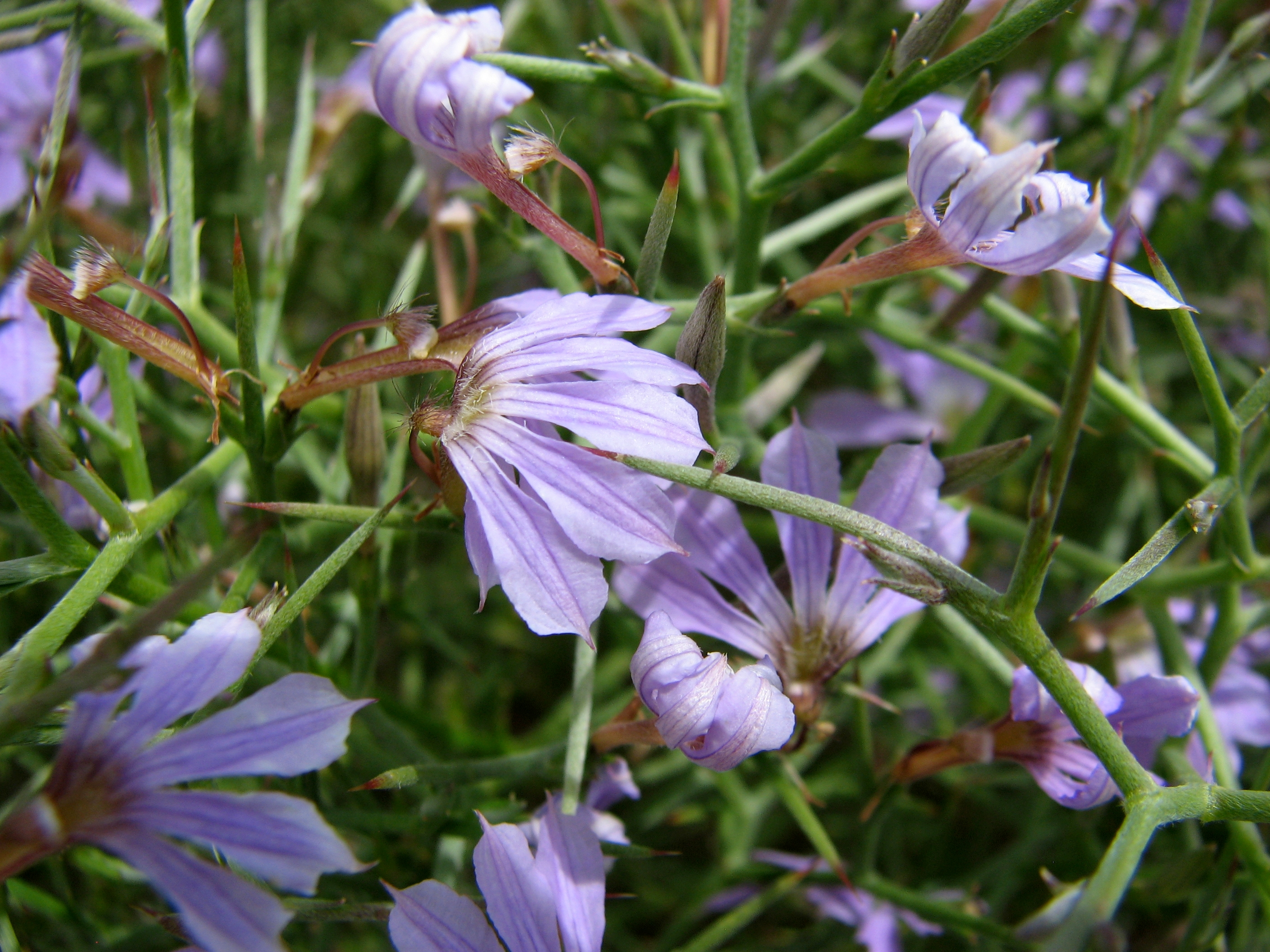

Scientific classification
- Kingdom: Plantae
- Clade: Tracheophytes
- Clade: Angiosperms
- Clade: Eudicots
- Clade: Asterids
- Order: Asterales
- Family: Goodeniaceae
- Genus: Scaevola
- Species: S. oxyclona

Binomial name
- Scaevola oxyclona F.Muell.
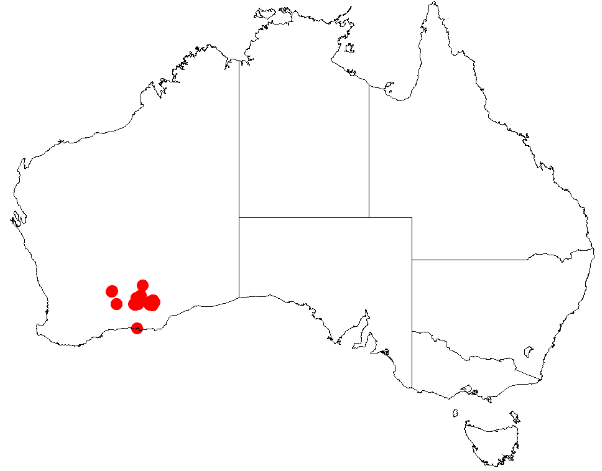
- Occurrence data from Australasian Virtual Herbarium

Synonyms
- Lobelia oxyclona (F.Muell.) Kuntze

= Scaevola oxyclona =

Species of shrub

Scaevola oxyclona, commonly known as tangled fanflower, is a species of flowering plant in the family Goodeniaceae and is endemic to the south of Western Australia. It is a widely branched, spiny subshrub with narrowly egg-shaped, sometimes toothed leaves at the base of the plant, sessile, narrowly egg-shaped to linear stem leaves, pale blue flowers in spikes, and rough or wrinkled, oval fruit.

== Description ==
Scaevola oxyclona is a widely spreading subshrub that typically grows to a height of up to 1.5 m (4 ft 11 in) and is covered with white hairs closely pressed against the surface. Its stems are striated and its branches spiny. The leaves are the base of the plant are narrowly egg-shaped with the narrower end towards the base, sometimes with toothed edges, 1–20 mm (0.039–0.787 in) long and 4–6 mm (0.16–0.24 in) wide. The stem leaves are sessile, narrowly egg-shaped with the narrower end towards the base, or linear, 3–10 mm (0.12–0.39 in) long. The flowers are borne in spikes up to 200 mm (7.9 in) long with leaf-like bracts and linear bracteoles about 2.5 mm (0.098 in) long. The sepals are more or less round, about 0.5 mm (0.020 in) long and free from each other. The petals are pale blue, 12–18 mm (0.47–0.71 in) long with fine, silky white hairs pressed against the surface on the outside and densely bearded inside. Flowering mainly occurs from August to December, and the fruit is about 2.5 mm (0.098 in) long, rough or wrinkled, and covered with white, silky hairs.

== Taxonomy ==
Scaevola oxyclona was first formally described in 1876 by Ferdinand von Mueller in his Fragmenta Phytographiae Australiae based on plant material collected at Frasers Range and Mount Benjamin.

== Distribution and habitat ==
This species of Scaevola grows in sandy soils or in stony loam or clay on rocky outcrops and low ranges between the Fraser and Bremer Ranges, and in the Coolgardie bioregion of southern Western Australia.

== Conservation status ==
Scaevola oxyclona is listed as 'not threatened' by the Government of Western Australia Department of Biodiversity, Conservation and Attractions.
