= Scaevola tenuifolia =

Scientific classification
- Kingdom: Plantae
- Clade: Tracheophytes
- Clade: Angiosperms
- Clade: Eudicots
- Clade: Asterids
- Order: Asterales
- Family: Goodeniaceae
- Genus: Scaevola
- Species: S. tenuifolia

Binomial name
- Scaevola tenuifolia Carolin

Species of flowering plant

Scaevola tenuifolia is a species of flowering plant in the family Goodeniaceae. It is a prostrate herb with white to blue flowers and endemic to Western Australia.

== Description ==
Scaevola tenuifolia is a prostrate herb to 1 m (3 ft 3 in) in diameter with horizontal branches covered in rigid, short, stiff, simple hairs and smaller, red, glandular hairs. The leaves are linear-shaped, rolled under, sometimes toothed near the apex, sessile, 7–45 mm (0.28–1.77 in) long and 1–4 mm (0.039–0.157 in) wide. The flowers are on a curved peduncle up to 10–15 mm (0.39–0.59 in) long, bracts leaf-like, triangular to linear shaped and 2–8 mm (0.079–0.315 in) long. The white, blue to pale purple corolla is 12–20 mm (0.47–0.79 in) long, 1.5 mm (0.059 in) wide, white hairs on the outer surface, thickly bearded on the inside, wings 2 mm (0.079 in) wide and 4–6 mm (0.16–0.24 in) long. Flowering occurs from August to January and the fruit is elliptic-shaped, about 4 mm (0.16 in) long, ribbed, and covered with long, upright hairs.

== Taxonomy and naming ==
Scaevola tenuifolia was first formally described in 1990 Roger Charles Carolin and the description was published in Telopea. The specific epithet (tenuifolia) means "narrow flowered".

== Distribution and habitat ==
This scaevola grows in quartzite soils on East Mount Barren and Thumb Peak range.
