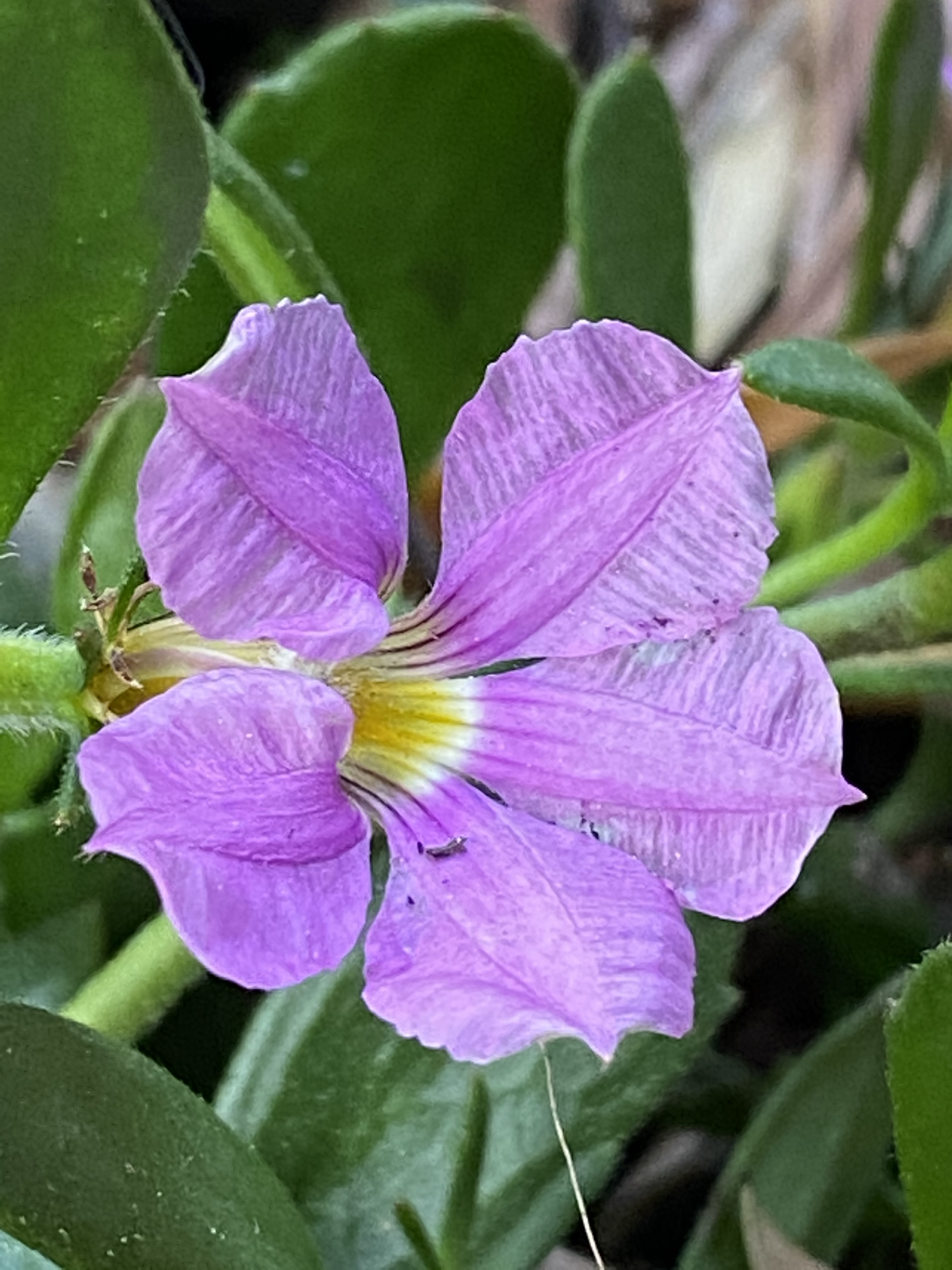

Scientific classification
- Kingdom: Plantae
- Clade: Tracheophytes
- Clade: Angiosperms
- Clade: Eudicots
- Clade: Asterids
- Order: Asterales
- Family: Goodeniaceae
- Genus: Scaevola
- Species: S. striata

Binomial name
- Scaevola striata R.Br.

= Scaevola striata =

Royal robe

Species of plant

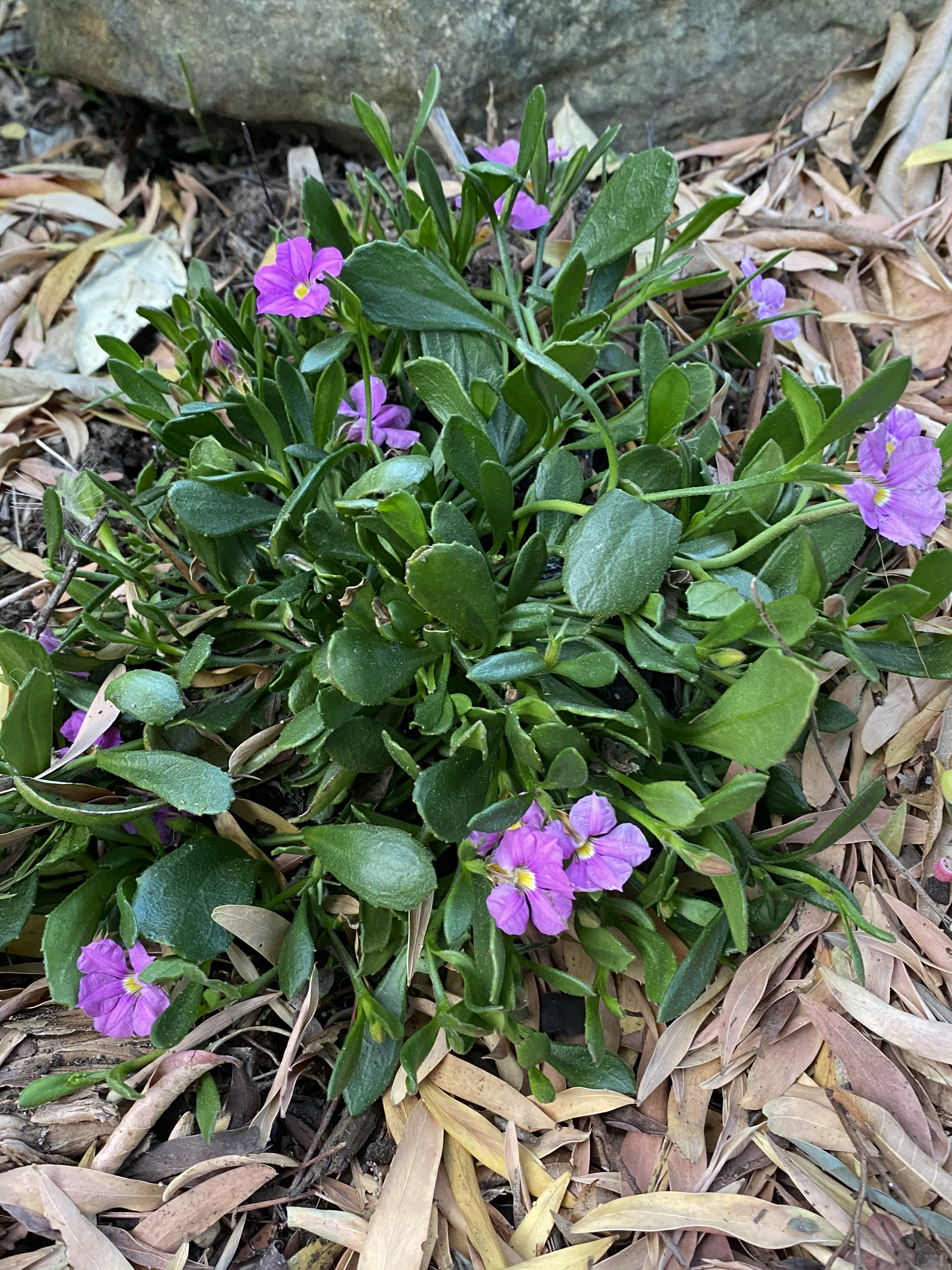
Habit

Scaevola striata, commonly known as royal robe, is a species of flowering plant in the family Goodeniaceae. It has blue fan-shaped flowers, and is endemic to Western Australia.

== Description ==
Scaevola striata is a suckering, spreading, perennial herb, 0.35–0.3 m (1 ft 2 in – 1 ft 0 in) high and 1 m (3 ft 3 in) wide and hairy stems. The leaves are variable, wedge-shaped or linear to egg-shaped, hairy, 1.5–5 cm (0.59–1.97 in) long, 3–20 mm (0.12–0.79 in) wide, upper leaves sessile, edges smooth, coarsely toothed toward the apex. The mostly single, fan-shaped flowers are on an axillary stalk, bracts small, lance or oval to oblong shaped, petals about 3 cm (1.2 in) wide with reddish parallel striations and short whitish hairs. Flowering occurs from August to January and the fruit is an oblong or oval shaped drupe to 5 mm (0.20 in) long.

== Taxonomy and naming ==
Scaevola striata was first formally described 1810 by Robert Brown and the description was published in Prodromus florae Novae Hollandiae et insulae Van-Diemen, exhibens characteres plantarum quas annis 1802-1805. The specific epithet ("striata") refers to the wings of the corolla.

== Distribution and habitat ==
Royal robe grows on sand plains and ridges in wet areas on the south coast of Western Australia.
