= Scaevola graminea =

Scientific classification
- Kingdom: Plantae
- Clade: Embryophytes
- Clade: Tracheophytes
- Clade: Spermatophytes
- Clade: Angiosperms
- Clade: Eudicots
- Clade: Asterids
- Order: Asterales
- Family: Goodeniaceae
- Genus: Scaevola
- Species: S. graminea

Binomial name
- Scaevola graminea Ewart & A.H.K.Petrie

Species of flowering plant

Scaevola graminea is a species of flowering plant in the family Goodeniaceae and is endemic to the Northern Territory, Australia. It is an erect subshrub with sessile, linear to narrowly oblong leaves, yellowish to bluish pink flowers, and oval fruit.

== Description ==
Scaevola graminea is an erect, glabrous subshrub that typically grows in a height of up to 50 cm (20 in). Its leaves are sessile, linear to narrowly oblong, 7–20 mm (0.28–0.79 in) long, less than 2 mm (0.079 in) wide and usually not toothed. The flowers are borne in spikes up to 150 mm (5.9 in) long with leaf-like bracts and linear bracteoles 5–7 mm (0.20–0.28 in) long and about 1/3 to 1/2 the length of the flower. The sepals are up to 1 mm (0.039 in) long and joined at the base. The petals are 14–17 mm (0.55–0.67 in) long, yellowish to bluish pink and glabrous on the outer surface and densely bearded inside. Flowering time has not been observed, but the fruit is oval, 4–5 mm (0.16–0.20 in) long, wrinkled and covered in soft hairs.

== Taxonomy and naming ==
Scaevola graminea was first formally described in 1926 by Alfred James Ewart and Arthur Petrie and the description was published in the Proceedings of the Royal Society of Victoria from specimens collected by Ewart in 1924. The specific epithet (graminea) means 'grass-like'.

== Distribution and habitat ==
This scaevola grows in rocky places in parts of the Northern Territory.

== Conservation status ==
Scaevola graminea is listed as 'data deficient' under the Northern Territory Territory Parks and Wildlife Conservation Act.
