= Scaevola chanii =

Conservation status
- Vulnerable (IUCN 3.1)

Scientific classification
- Kingdom: Plantae
- Clade: Tracheophytes
- Clade: Angiosperms
- Clade: Eudicots
- Clade: Asterids
- Order: Asterales
- Family: Goodeniaceae
- Genus: Scaevola
- Species: S. chanii

Binomial name
- Scaevola chanii K.M.Wong

Species of flowering plant

Scaevola chanii is a species of plant in the family Goodeniaceae. It is endemic to Borneo where it is confined to Sabah.

Scaevola chanii is a shrub or treelet which grows to 2 to 3 meters tall.

Scaevola chanii is found only on the south face of Mount Kinabalu. It grows in upper montane rain forest on ultramafic soil, from 2,500 to 3,000 meters elevation.
