= Scaevola eneabba =

Conservation status
- Priority Two — Poorly Known Taxa (DEC)

Scientific classification
- Kingdom: Plantae
- Clade: Tracheophytes
- Clade: Angiosperms
- Clade: Eudicots
- Clade: Asterids
- Order: Asterales
- Family: Goodeniaceae
- Genus: Scaevola
- Species: S. eneabba

Binomial name
- Scaevola eneabba Carolin
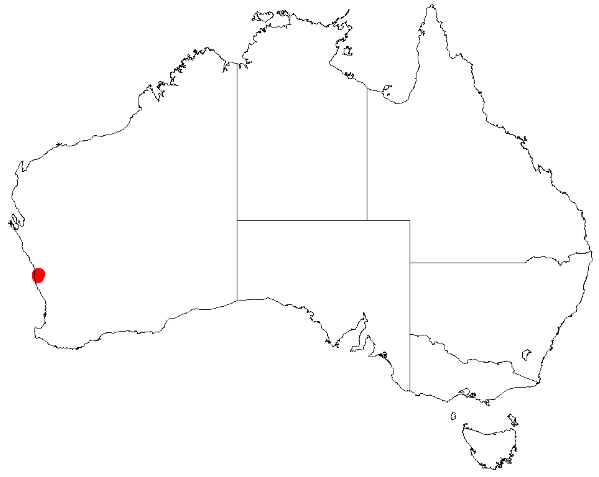
- Occurrence data from AVH

Species of flowering plant

Scaevola eneabba is a species of flowering plant in the family Goodeniaceae. It is a small, spreading shrub with fan-shaped white to pink flowers and is endemic to Western Australia.

== Description ==
Scaevola eneabba is an understorey shrub up to 60 cm (24 in) high with long, upright, simple hairs but smooth at the base. The leaves are sessile, linear to oblong-lance shaped, thick, margins smooth, 30 mm (1.2 in) long and up to 2 mm (0.079 in) wide and rounded at the apex. The flowers are borne in terminal spikes up to 25 mm (0.98 in) long, bracts narrowly egg-shaped, up to 8 mm (0.31 in) long, about 1 mm (0.039 in) wide and with bristles on the margins. The white to pink corolla is about 9 mm (0.35 in) long, outside covered with simple, rigid, brown hairs toward the apex and tiny, scattered hairs all over. The flower lobes are covered with soft hairs on the inside and throat, narrowly elliptic, about 6 mm (0.24 in) wide and the wings about 1.5 mm (0.059 in) wide. Flowering occurs around December.

== Taxonomy and naming ==
Scaevola eneabba was first formally described in 1990 by Roger Charles Carolin and the description was published in Telopea. The specific epithet (eneabba) refers to the type location.

== Distribution and habitat ==
This scaevola grows in heath near Eneabba in Western Australia.

== Conservation status ==
Scaevola eneabba is listed as "Priority Two" by the Western Australian Government Department of Biodiversity, Conservation and Attractions, meaning that it is poorly known and from only one or a few locations.
