= Scaevola socotraensis =

Conservation status
- Critically Endangered (IUCN 3.1)

Scientific classification
- Kingdom: Plantae
- Clade: Tracheophytes
- Clade: Angiosperms
- Clade: Eudicots
- Clade: Asterids
- Order: Asterales
- Family: Goodeniaceae
- Genus: Scaevola
- Species: S. socotraensis

Binomial name
- Scaevola socotraensis St.John

Species of flowering plant

Scaevola socotraensis is a species of flowering plant in the family Goodeniaceae. It is endemic to Socotra off the coast of mainland Yemen. There are just a few individuals of this critically endangered plant growing at freshwater seeps on the island. Changes in the hydrology of the local ecosystem caused by development are a threat.
