= Scaevola ballajupensis =

Scientific classification
- Kingdom: Plantae
- Clade: Tracheophytes
- Clade: Angiosperms
- Clade: Eudicots
- Clade: Asterids
- Order: Asterales
- Family: Goodeniaceae
- Genus: Scaevola
- Species: S. ballajupensis

Binomial name
- Scaevola ballajupensis L.W.Sage

Species of shrub

Scaevola ballajupensis is a species of flowering plant in the family Goodeniaceae and is endemic to a small area in the south-west of Western Australia. It is a low-lying perennial herb with hairy, lobed to toothed, narrowly egg-shaped or lance-shaped leaves with the narrower end towards the base, white flowers with brown markings, and rough, elliptic to oval fruit.

== Description ==
Scaevola ballajupensis is a low-lying perennial herb that typically grows up to about 15 cm (5.9 in) high and 1 m (3 ft 3 in) wide with long, soft white hairs on the stems and new growth. The stem leaves are narrowly egg-shaped or narrowly lance-shaped with the narrower end towards the base, and lobed to toothed, 11–75 mm (0.43–2.95 in) long, 1–17 mm (0.039–0.669 in) wide with a stem-clasping base. The flowers are borne in loosely arranged spikes on the ends of branches, with leaf-like bracts 11–43 mm (0.43–1.69 in) long and hairy, linear bracteoles 5–11 mm (0.20–0.43 in) long. The sepals are joined to form a tube with a rim of teeth about 0.3 mm (0.012 in) long on the end. The petals are white with brown markings in the throat, 7.0–11.5 mm (0.28–0.45 in) long, with hairs on the outside of the lobes and bearded inside, the lobes about 3 mm (0.12 in) long and 1 mm (0.039 in) wide. The ovary has two locules and is glabrous. Flowering occurs in September and October, and the fruit is rough, glabrous, elliptic to oval and about 3 mm (0.12 in) long.

== Taxonomy ==
Scaevola ballajupensis was first formally described in 2002 by Leigh William Sage in the journal Nuytsia from specimens collected in the Bridgetown area in 2000. The specific epithet (ballajupensis) refers to Ballajup Rock, the local name for the granite outcrop, near the only known occurrence of this species.

== Distribution and habitat ==
This species of Scaevola is only known from a private property near Bridgetown, where it grows in jarrah-marri (Eucalyptus marginata/Corymbia calophylla) woodland in sandy gravel with granite outcropping nearby, in the Jarrah Forest bioregion of south-western Western Australia.

== Conservation status ==
Scaevola ballajupensis is listed as "Priority One" by the Western Australian Government Department of Biodiversity, Conservation and Attractions, meaning it is known from only a few populations which are under immediate threat from known threatening processes.
