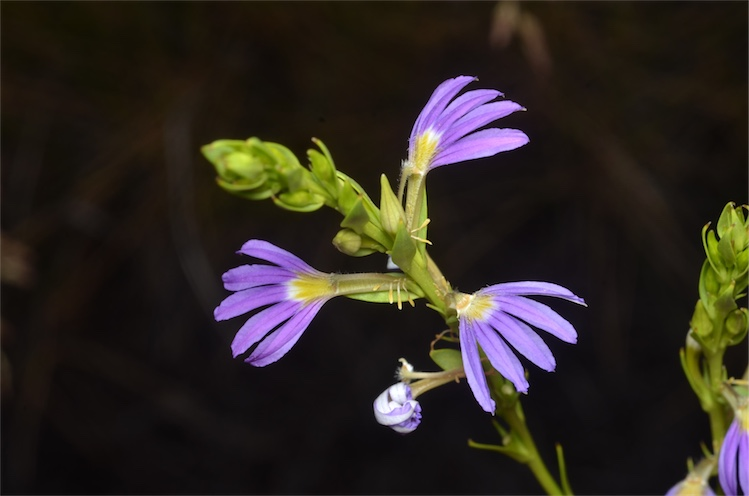

Scientific classification
- Kingdom: Plantae
- Clade: Embryophytes
- Clade: Tracheophytes
- Clade: Spermatophytes
- Clade: Angiosperms
- Clade: Eudicots
- Clade: Asterids
- Order: Asterales
- Family: Goodeniaceae
- Genus: Scaevola
- Species: S. glabrata

Binomial name
- Scaevola glabrata Carolin

= Scaevola glabrata =

Species of flowering plant

Scaevola glabrata is a species of flowering plant in the family Goodeniaceae. It is a small, spreading shrub with fan-shaped blue flowers and elliptic to egg-shaped leaves.

== Description ==
Scaevola glabrata is a spreading understorey shrub up to 70 cm (28 in) tall with upright needle-shaped stems that are glabrous or with occasional scattered hairs. The leaves are sessile or with a very short petiole, occasionally almost stem-clasping, egg-shaped, toothed, 21–68 mm (0.83–2.68 in) long and 6–26 mm (0.24–1.02 in) wide. The flowers are borne on spikes up to 12 cm (4.7 in) long, bracts elliptic-oval shaped and up to 15 mm (0.59 in) long. The blue corolla is 14–24 mm (0.55–0.94 in) long, hairy on the outside, bearded inside and the wings up to 10 mm (0.39 in) wide. Flowering occurs February to September and the fruit is cylinder-shaped, 4–6 mm (0.16–0.24 in) long, wrinkled and covered in soft hairs.

== Taxonomy and naming ==
Scaevola glabrata was first formally described in 1986 by Roger Charles Carolin and the description was published in Flora of South Australia. The specific epithet (glabrata) means glabrous.

== Distribution and habitat ==
This scaevola grows mostly in rocky locations, sometimes in sand, extending from the Northern Territory, not including Arnhem Land, south to the northern parts of South Australia and just over the border into Queensland.
