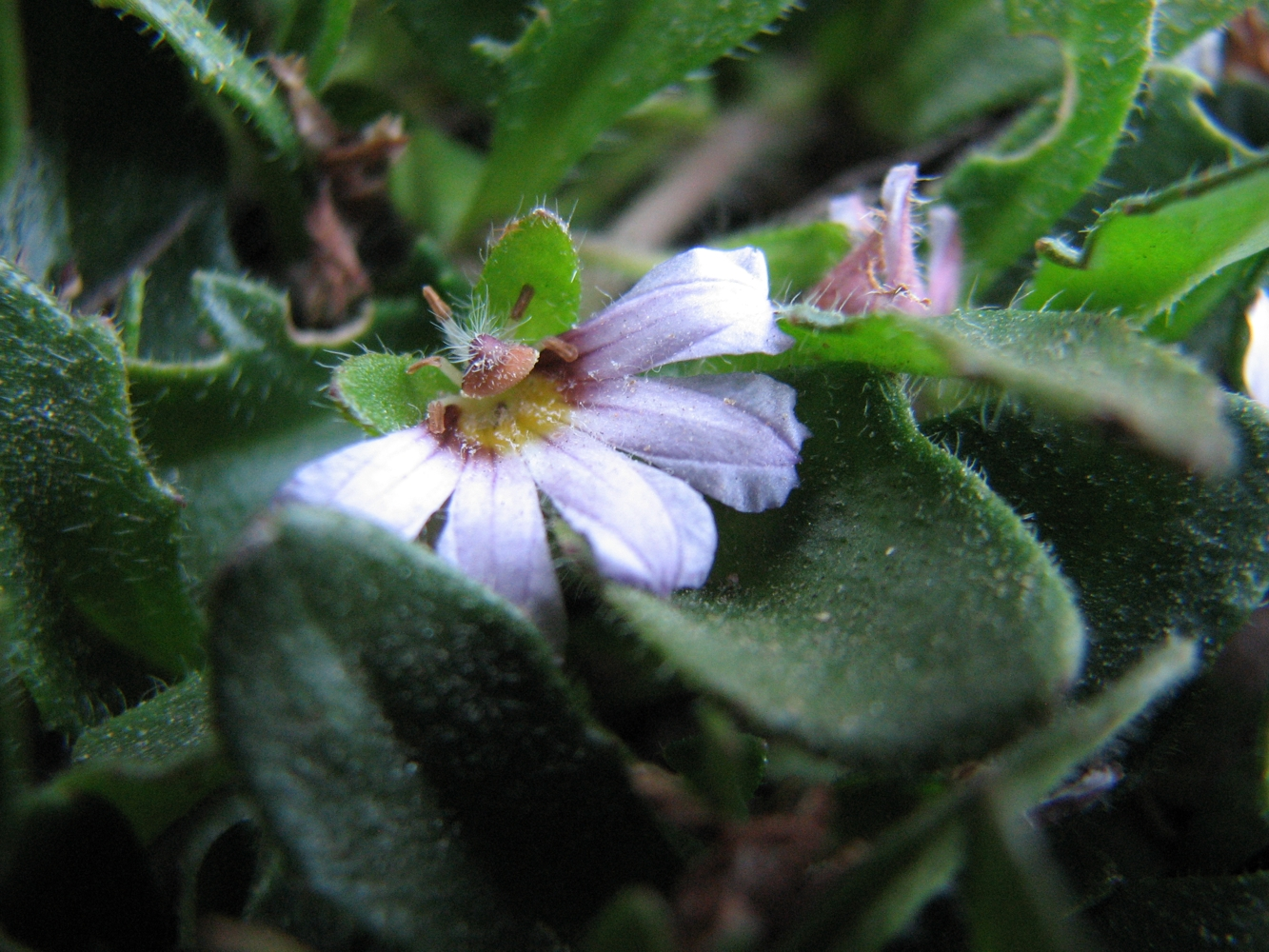

Scientific classification
- Kingdom: Plantae
- Clade: Embryophytes
- Clade: Tracheophytes
- Clade: Spermatophytes
- Clade: Angiosperms
- Clade: Eudicots
- Clade: Asterids
- Order: Asterales
- Family: Goodeniaceae
- Genus: Scaevola
- Species: S. hookeri

Binomial name
- Scaevola hookeri (de Vriese) F.Muell. ex Hook.f.
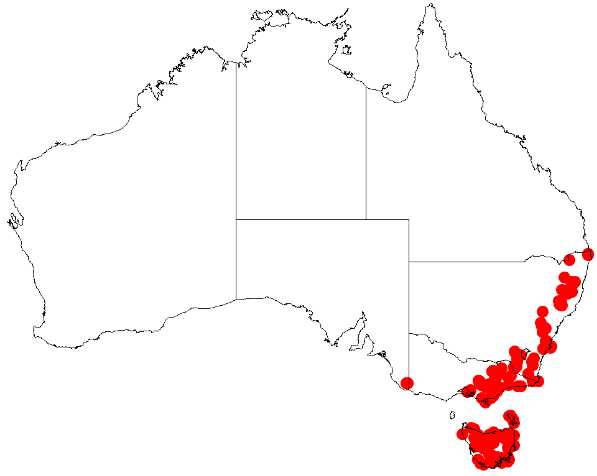
- Occurrence data from Australasian Virtual Herbarium

Synonyms
- Lobelia hookeri (de Vriese) Kuntze; Merkusia hookeri de Vriese; Scaevola hookeri F.Muell. nom. inval., nom. nud.; Scaevola hookeri F.Muell. nom. inval., nom. nud.

= Scaevola hookeri =

Species of plant

Scaevola hookeri, commonly known as the creeping fan-flower or alpine fan-flower, is a species of flowering plant in the family Goodeniaceae. It has white or blue flowers with a yellow throat and grows in eastern Australia.

== Description ==
Scaevola hookeri is a prostrate, perennial herb with stems up to 30 cm (12 in) long that root at the nodes and long, rough, upright to soft, thin, weak hairs. The leaves are 1–5 cm (0.39–1.97 in) long, and 2 to 15 mm wide, oval to oblong, both surfaces with occasional flattened, soft, short hairs, margins flat, smooth or toothed on a short stalk. The flowers are borne singly in leaf axils, white or blue with a yellowish throat on a peduncle 1–8 mm (0.039–0.315 in) long, bracteoles oblong to elliptic shaped and 4–6 mm (0.16–0.24 in) long. The corolla is rough on the outside, with occasional soft, weak hairs on the inside and petals up to 1 mm (0.039 in) wide. Flowering occurs usually from November to March and the egg-shaped fruit is about 3 mm (0.12 in) long, wrinkled with short, soft, upright hairs.

== Taxonomy and naming ==
Scaevola hookeri was first formally described in 1851 by W.H. de Vriese and the description was published in Nederlandsch Kruidkundig Archief and given the name Merkusia hookeri. The species was transferred to the genus Scaevola in 1856. The specific epithet (hookeri) is named in honour of Joseph Dalton Hooker.

== Distribution and habitat ==
Creeping fan-flower grows in grassland and woodland in high altitude areas in Victoria, New South Wales, Tasmania, and also South Australia where it is listed as "endangered".
