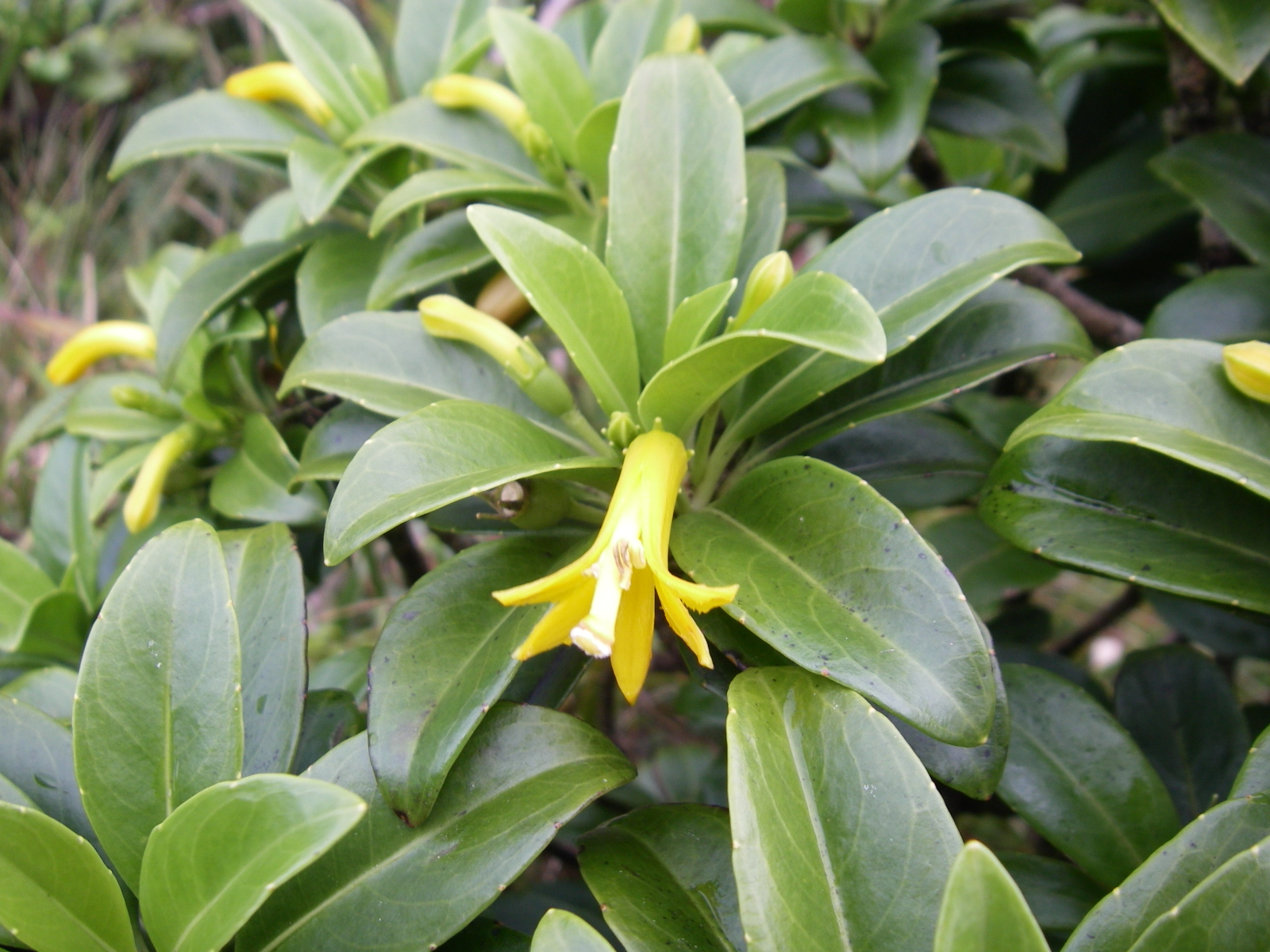

Scientific classification
- Kingdom: Plantae
- Clade: Tracheophytes
- Clade: Angiosperms
- Clade: Eudicots
- Clade: Asterids
- Order: Asterales
- Family: Goodeniaceae
- Genus: Scaevola
- Species: S. glabra

Binomial name
- Scaevola glabra Hook.& Arn.

= Scaevola glabra =

'ohe naupaka

Species of shrub

Scaevola glabra, the 'ohe naupaka, is a shrub in the family Goodeniaceae. The flowers are yellow.

The plant is endemic to Hawaii, and naturally found on Oʻahu and Kauaʻi.

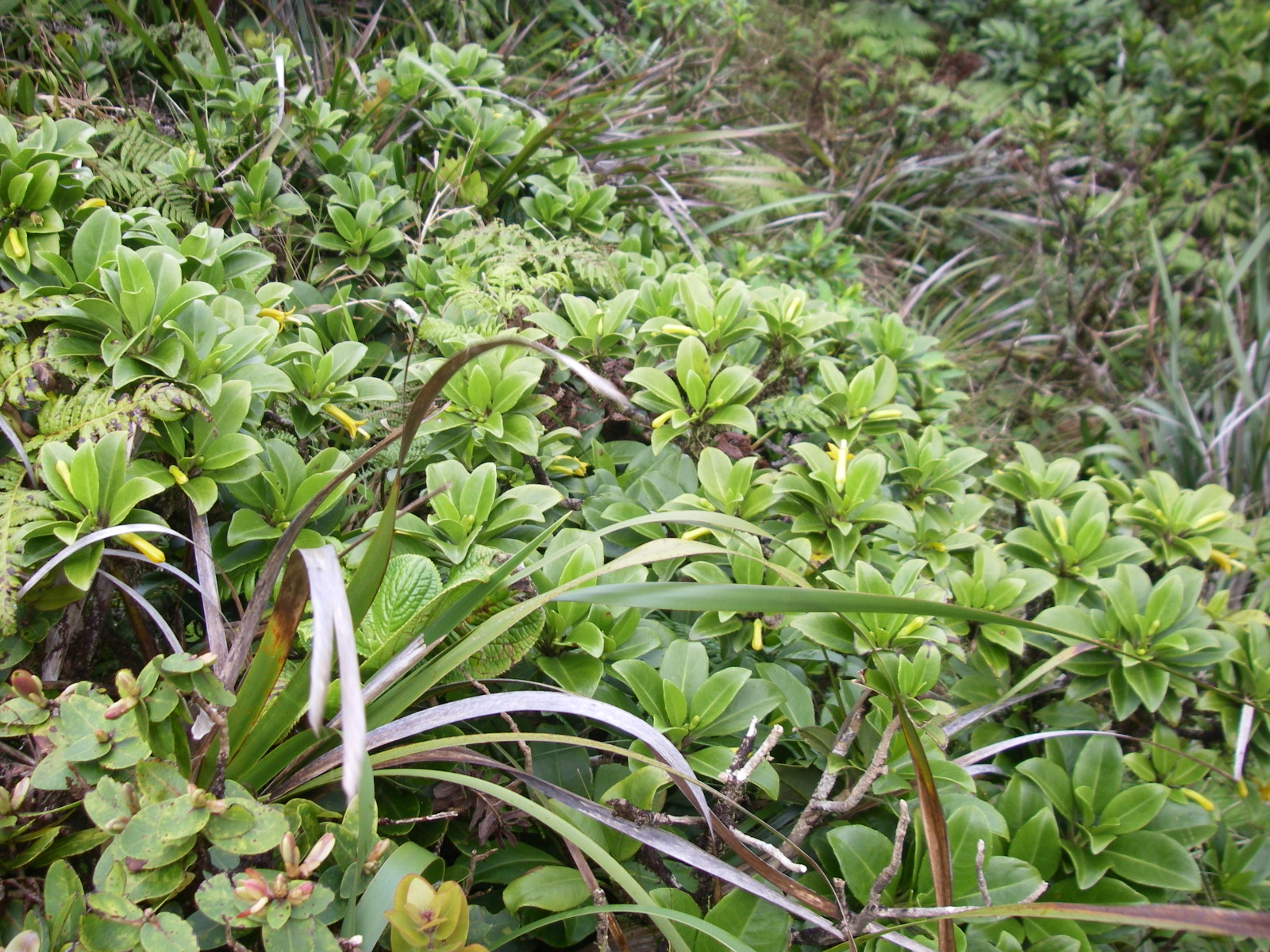
Scaevola glabra and other Hawaiian plants
