= Scaevola micrantha =

Conservation status
- Least Concern (IUCN 3.1)

Scientific classification
- Kingdom: Plantae
- Clade: Tracheophytes
- Clade: Angiosperms
- Clade: Eudicots
- Clade: Asterids
- Order: Asterales
- Family: Goodeniaceae
- Genus: Scaevola
- Species: S. micrantha

Binomial name
- Scaevola micrantha C.Presl

Synonyms
- Lobelia micrantha (C.Presl) Kuntze; Temminckia micrantha (C.Presl) de Vriese; Scaevola merrillii Elmer; Scaevola pedunculata Merr.

Species of plant

Scaevola micrantha is a plant in the family Goodeniaceae. The specific epithet micrantha means 'small flower'.

== Description ==
Scaevola micrantha grows as a shrub or tree up to 10 m (33 ft) tall, with a diameter of 5 cm (2 in). The green to grey bark is smooth, sometimes flaky. The leaves are oblanceolate to obovate and measure up to 15 cm (6 in) long.

== Distribution and habitat ==
Scaevola micrantha is native to the Philippines and Borneo (where it is confined to Sabah). Its habitat is in areas of ultramafic rock, to elevations of about 1,500 m (5,000 ft).
