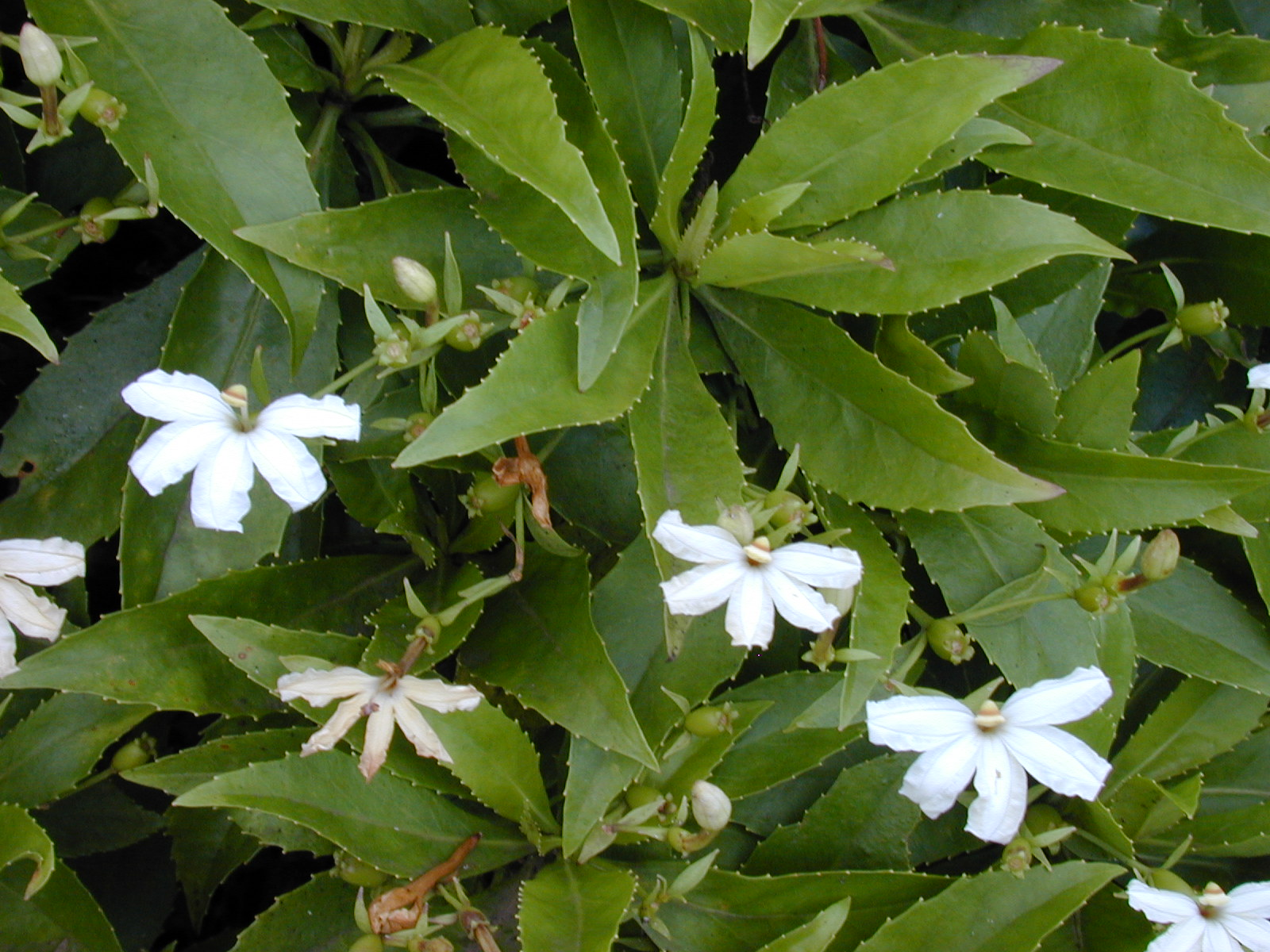
- Scaevola chamissoniana

Scientific classification
- Kingdom: Plantae
- Clade: Tracheophytes
- Clade: Angiosperms
- Clade: Eudicots
- Clade: Asterids
- Order: Asterales
- Family: Goodeniaceae
- Genus: Scaevola; L.

Type species
- Lobelia plumieri L.

Species
- About 120, see text

Synonyms
- Lobelia Mill.; Nigromnia Carolin

= Scaevola (plant) =

Genus of flowering plants in the Goodenia family

Scaevola (/ˈsiːvələ, ˈsɛv-/; SE(E)V-ə-lə) is a genus of flowering plants in the Goodenia family, Goodeniaceae. It consists of more than 130 species, with the center of diversity being Australia and Polynesia, the only Goodeniaceae genus widespread outside of the continent. There are around 80 species occurring throughout Australia in a variety of habitats. Diversity is highest in the Southwest, where around 40 species are endemic.

Common names for Scaevola species include scaevolas, fan-flowers, half-flowers, and naupaka, the plants' Hawaiian name.

In at least six separate dispersals, about 40 species have spread throughout the Pacific Basin, with a few reaching the tropical Atlantic and Indians coasts.

== Description ==
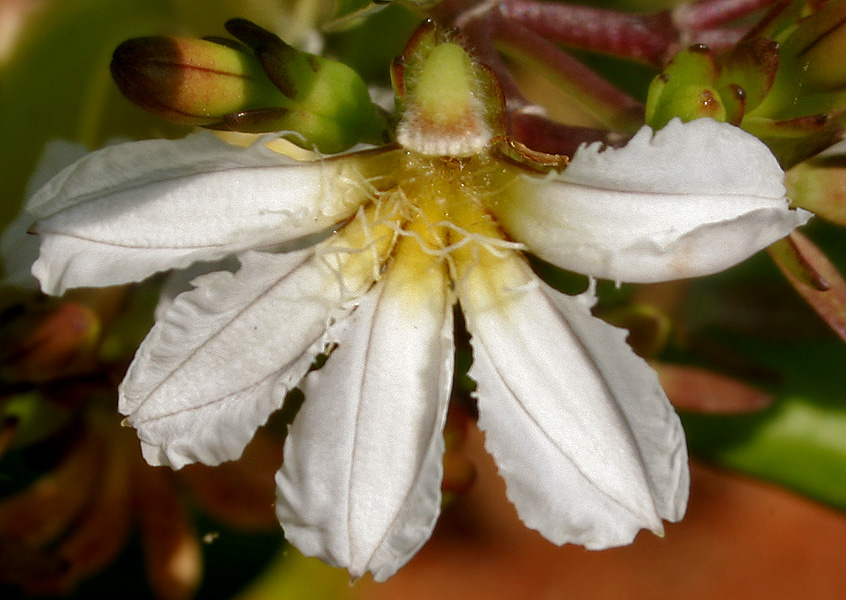
Scaevola taccada in Rangareddy district of Andhra Pradesh, India.

The flowers are shaped as if they have been cut in half. Consequently, the generic name means "left-handed" (scaevus) in Latin. Many Hawaiian legends have been told to explain the formation of the shape of the flowers: one version tells of a woman who tore a whole naupaka flower in half after a quarrel with her lover. The gods, angered, turn all naupaka flowers into half flowers and the two lovers remained separated while the man is destined to search in vain for another whole flower.

The Hawaiian islands are home to ten Scaevola species, nine of which are endemic. Eight of the indigenous species are the result of a single colonization event. S. glabra and S. taccada arrived separately to produce a total of three generic colonizations. Some of the endemic species are of hybrid origin.

Beach naupaka (Scaevola taccada synonym S. sericea) occurs throughout the Pacific and Indian Oceans and is considered an invasive species in Florida, USA, and in some islands of the Caribbean including the Cayman Islands and the Bahamas. Beachberry or inkberry (Scaevola plumieri) is widespread along the Atlantic coast of the tropical Americas and Africa; however, it is becoming rarer in areas where S. taccada is displacing native coastal plants.

Most Australian scaevoli have dry fruits and sprawling, herbaceous to shrubby habits. By contrast, nearly all species outside Australia have shrub habits with fleshy fruit making dispersal by frugivores easy.

The plant pathogenic sac fungus Mycosphaerella scaevolae was discovered on a Scaevola fan-flower.

In Europe, S. aemula is a fairly common container- and bedding plant, usually grown as an annual.

== Taxonomy ==
The genus Scaevola was first described by Carl Linnaeus in 1771. He did not explain the origin of the genus name in text, but it is generally accepted an allusion to the one-sided shape of the flower, which has a five-lobed tubular corolla; scaevus in Latin means 'left-handed'. Linnaeus created the genus for a species he had previously described as Lobelia plumieri, which is thus the type species, though he did not explicitly use the epithet plumieri in combination with the new genus Scaevola; the combination Scaevola plumieri was first published by Martin Vahl in 1791.

=== Species ===
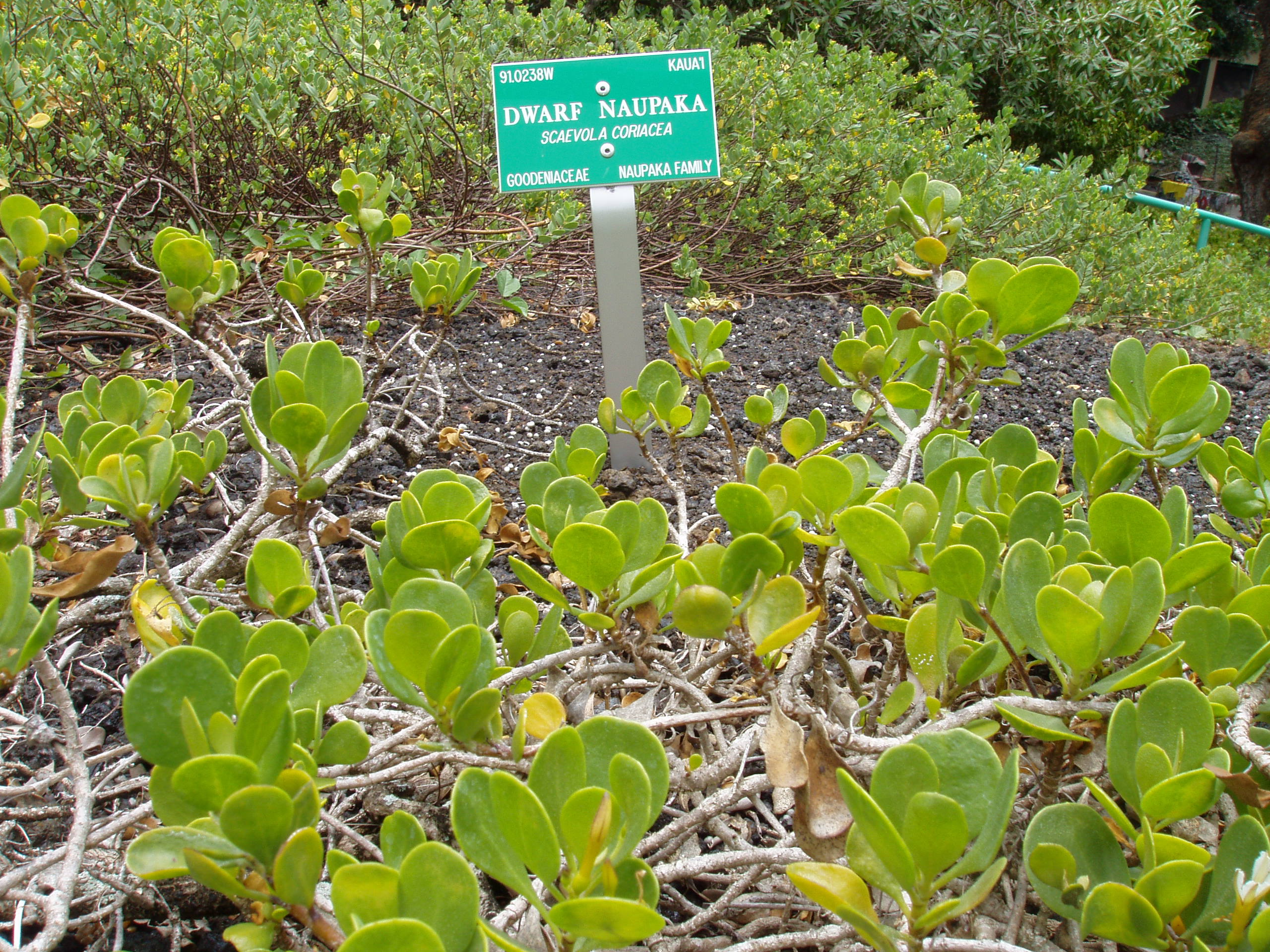
Scaevola coriacea (dwarf naupaka) at Liliʻuokalani Botanical Garden, Honolulu

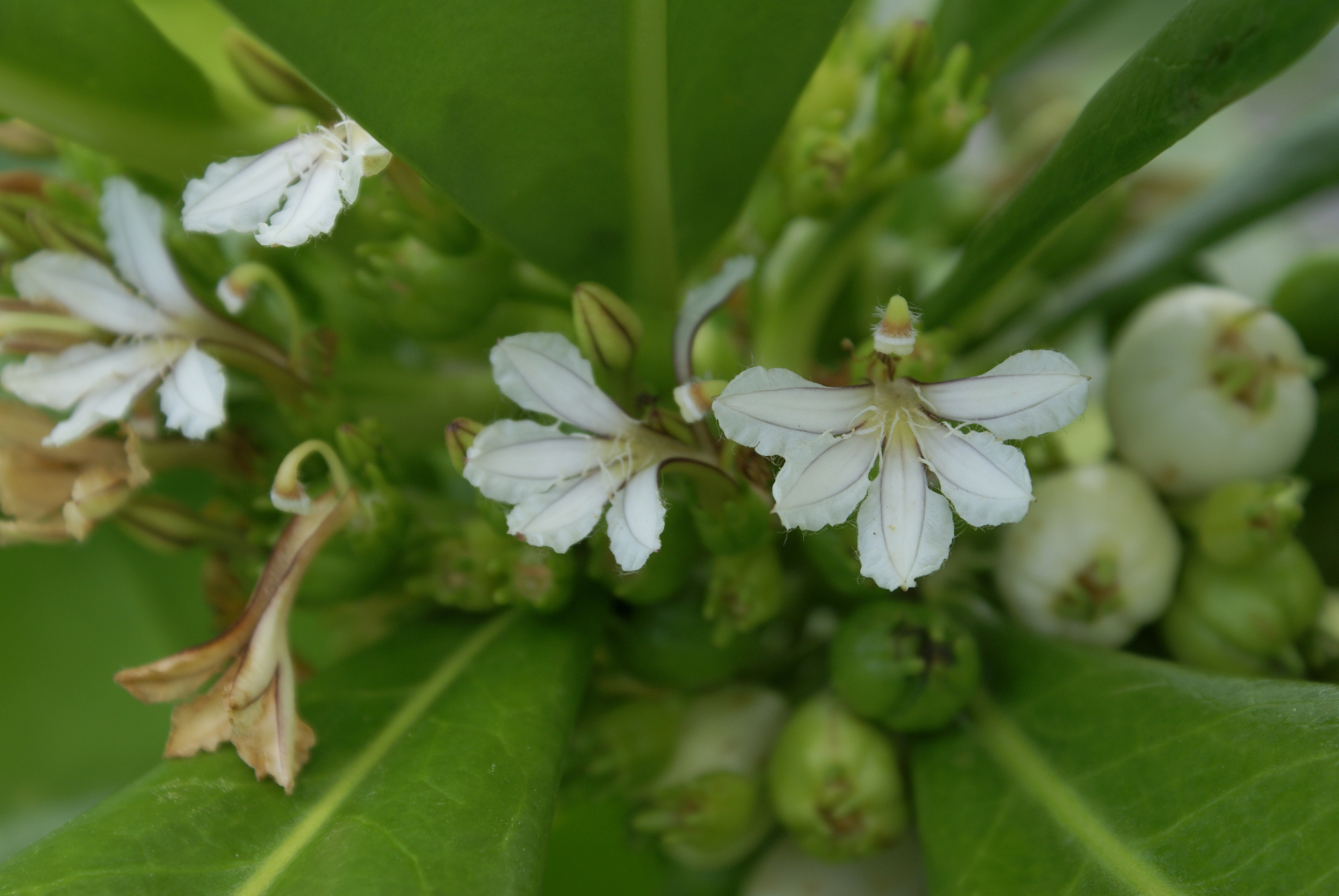
Flowers of Scaevola taccada (beach naupaka)

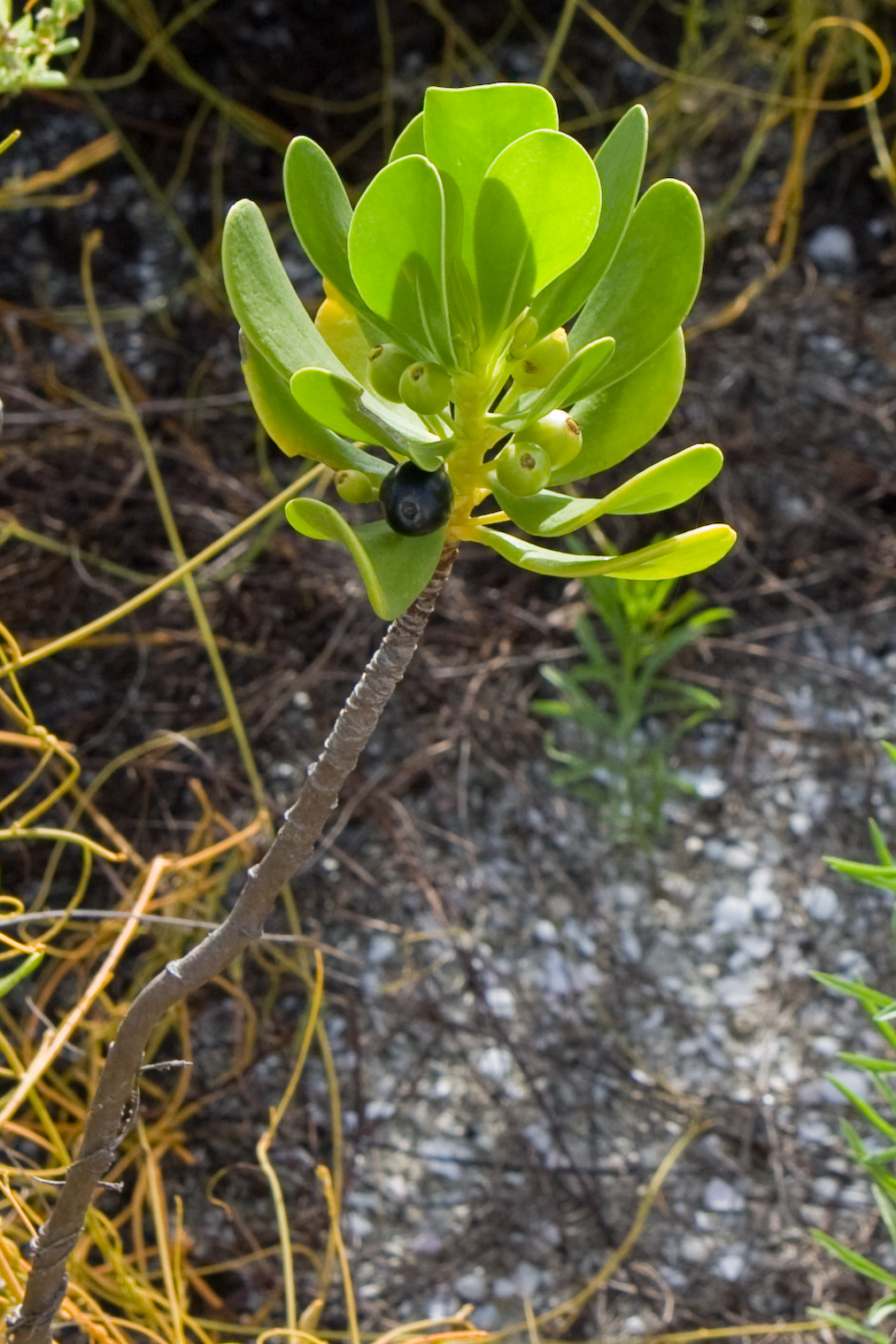
Scaevola plumieri with ripe and unripe drupes at Honeymoon Island State Park, Dunedin, Florida

As of March 2026, Plants of the World Online accepted the following species:

- Scaevola acacioides Carolin (W.A.)
- Scaevola aemula R.Br. – fairy fan-flower, common fan-flower (W.A., S.A., Qld., N.S.W., Vic., Tas.)
- Scaevola albida (Sm.) Druce – pale fan-flower, small-fruit fan-flower (S.A., Qld., N.S.W., Vic., Tas.)
- Scaevola amblyanthera F.Muell. (W.A., N.T., S.A., Qld.)
- Scaevola anchusifolia Benth. – silky scaevola (W.A.)
- Scaevola angulata R.Br. (N.T.)
- Scaevola angustata Carolin (S.A.)
- Scaevola archeriana L.W.Sage (W.A.)
- Scaevola argentea Carolin (W.A.)
- Scaevola auriculata Benth. (W.A.)
- Scaevola balansae Guillaumin (New Caledonia)
- Scaevola ballajupensis L.W.Sage (W.A.)
- Scaevola barrierei A.S.Wulff & Munzinger (New Caledonia)
- Scaevola basedowii Carolin – Basedow's fanflower (W.A., N.T., S.A.)
- Scaevola beckii Zahlbr. (New Caledonia)
- Scaevola brooksiana F.Muell. (W.A.)
- Scaevola browniana Carolin (W.A., N.T., Qld.)
- Scaevola bursariifolia J.M.Black (W.A., S.A.)
- Scaevola calendulacea (Andrews) Druce – dune fan-flower (S.A., Qld., N.S.W., Vic.)
- Scaevola calliptera Benth. (W.A.)
- Scaevola canescens Benth. (W.A.)
- Scaevola × cerasifolia Skottsb. (Hawaii)
- Scaevola chamissoniana Gaudich. (Hawaii)
- Scaevola chanii K.M.Wong (Borneo)
- Scaevola chrysopogon Carolin (W.A.)
- Scaevola coccinea Däniker (New Caledonia)
- Scaevola collina J.M.Black ex E.L.Robertson (S.A.)
- Scaevola coriacea Nutt. (Hawaii)
- Scaevola crassifolia Labill. – thick-leaved fan-flower, cushion fanflower (W.A., S.A.)
- Scaevola cuneiformis Labill. – wedge-leaved scaevola (W.A.)
- Scaevola cunninghamii DC. (W.A.)
- Scaevola cylindrica Schltr. & K.Krause (New Caledonia, Vanuatu)
- Scaevola densifolia Carolin (W.A.)
- Scaevola depauperata R.Br. – skeleton fan-flower (S.A., Vic., N.T., N.S.W., Qld.)
- Scaevola enantophylla F.Muell. – climbing fan-flower (Qld.)
- Scaevola eneabba Carolin (W.A.)
- Scaevola erosa Guillaumin (New Caledonia)
- Scaevola filifolia (R.Br.) K.A.Sheph. – thread-leaved Diaspasis, (W.A.)
- Scaevola floribunda A.Gray (Fiji)
- Scaevola gaudichaudiana Cham. (Hawaii)
- Scaevola gaudichaudii Hook. & Arn. (Hawaii)
- Scaevola glabra Hook. & Arn. (Hawaii)
- Scaevola glabrata Carolin (N.T., S.A., Qld.)
- Scaevola glandulifera DC. – viscid hand-flower (W.A.)
- Scaevola globosa (Carolin) Carolin (W.A.)
- Scaevola globulifera Labill. (W.A.)
- Scaevola glutinosa Carolin (Qld.)
- Scaevola gracilis Hook.f. (Kermadec Islands, Tonga)
- Scaevola graminea Ewart & A.H.K.Petrie (N.T.)
- Scaevola hainanensis Hance (Chad, China, Taiwan, Vietnam)
- Scaevola hamiltonii K.Krause (W.A.)
- Scaevola hobdyi W.L.Wagner (Hawaii)
- Scaevola hookeri (de Vriese) F.Muell. ex Hook.f. – creeping fan-flower, alpine fan-flower (N.S.W., Vic., S.A., Tas.)
- Scaevola humifusa de Vriese – procumbent scaevola (W.A.)
- Scaevola humilis R.Br. (N.T., S.A., Qld., N.S.W.)
- Scaevola kallophylla G.J.Howell (W.A.)
- Scaevola kilaueae O.Deg. (Hawaii)
- Scaevola laciniata F.M.Bailey (N.T., W.A., Qld.)
- Scaevola lanceolata Benth. – long-leaved scaevola (W.A.)
- Scaevola linearis R.Br. – rough fanflower (S.A.)
- Scaevola macrophylla (de Vriese) Benth. (W.A.)
- Scaevola macropyrena I.H.Müll. (New Caledonia)
- Scaevola macrostachya (de Vriese) Benth. (W.A.)
- Scaevola marquesensis F.Br. (Marquesas)
- Scaevola micrantha C.Presl (Borneo, Philippines)
- Scaevola microphylla (de Vriese) Benth. – small-leaved scaevola (W.A.)
- Scaevola mollis Hook. & Arn. (Hawaii)
- Scaevola montana Labill. (New Caledonia, Vanuatu)
- Scaevola muluensis K.M.Wong (Borneo)
- Scaevola myrtifolia (de Vriese) K.Krause (W.A., S.A.)
- Scaevola neoebudica Guillaumin (Vanuatu)
- Scaevola nitida R.Br. – shining fanflower (W.A.)
- Scaevola nubigena Lauterb. (Samoa)
- Scaevola obovata Carolin (S.A., N.T.)
- Scaevola oldfieldii F.Muell. (W.A.)
- Scaevola oppositifolia Roxb.
- Scaevola ovalifolia R.Br. – bushy fanflower (N.T., Qld.)
- Scaevola oxyclona F.Muell. – tangled fanflower (W.A.)
- Scaevola paludosa R.Br.
- Scaevola parvibarbata Carolin
- Scaevola parviflora K.Krause
- Scaevola parvifolia F.Muell. ex Benth.
- Scaevola pauciflora Leenh.
- Scaevola paulayi Fosberg
- Scaevola phlebopetala F.Muell.
- Scaevola pilosa Benth.
- Scaevola platyphylla Lindl.
- Scaevola plumieri (L.) Vahl
- Scaevola porocarya F.Muell.
- Scaevola porrecta A.C.Sm.
- Scaevola procera Hillebr.
- Scaevola pulchella Carolin
- Scaevola pulvinaris K.Krause
- Scaevola racemigera Däniker
- Scaevola ramosissima (Sm.) K.Krause
- Scaevola repens de Vriese
- Scaevola restiacea Benth.
- Scaevola revoluta R.Br.
- Scaevola rialagartensis Cast.-Campos
- Scaevola samoensis Whistler
- Scaevola sericophylla F.Muell. ex Benth.
- Scaevola socotraensis H.St.John
- Scaevola spicigera Carolin
- Scaevola spinescens R.Br.
- Scaevola striata R.Br.
- Scaevola subalpina Malabrigo & Ondoy
- Scaevola subcapitata F.Br.
- Scaevola taccada (Gaertn.) Roxb.
- Scaevola tahitensis Carlquist
- Scaevola tenuifolia Carolin
- Scaevola thesioides Benth.
- Scaevola tomentosa Gaudich.
- Scaevola tortuosa Benth.
- Scaevola verticillata Leenh.
- Scaevola virgata Carolin
- Scaevola wrightii (Griseb.) M.Gómez
- Scaevola xanthina K.A.Sheph. & Hislop
