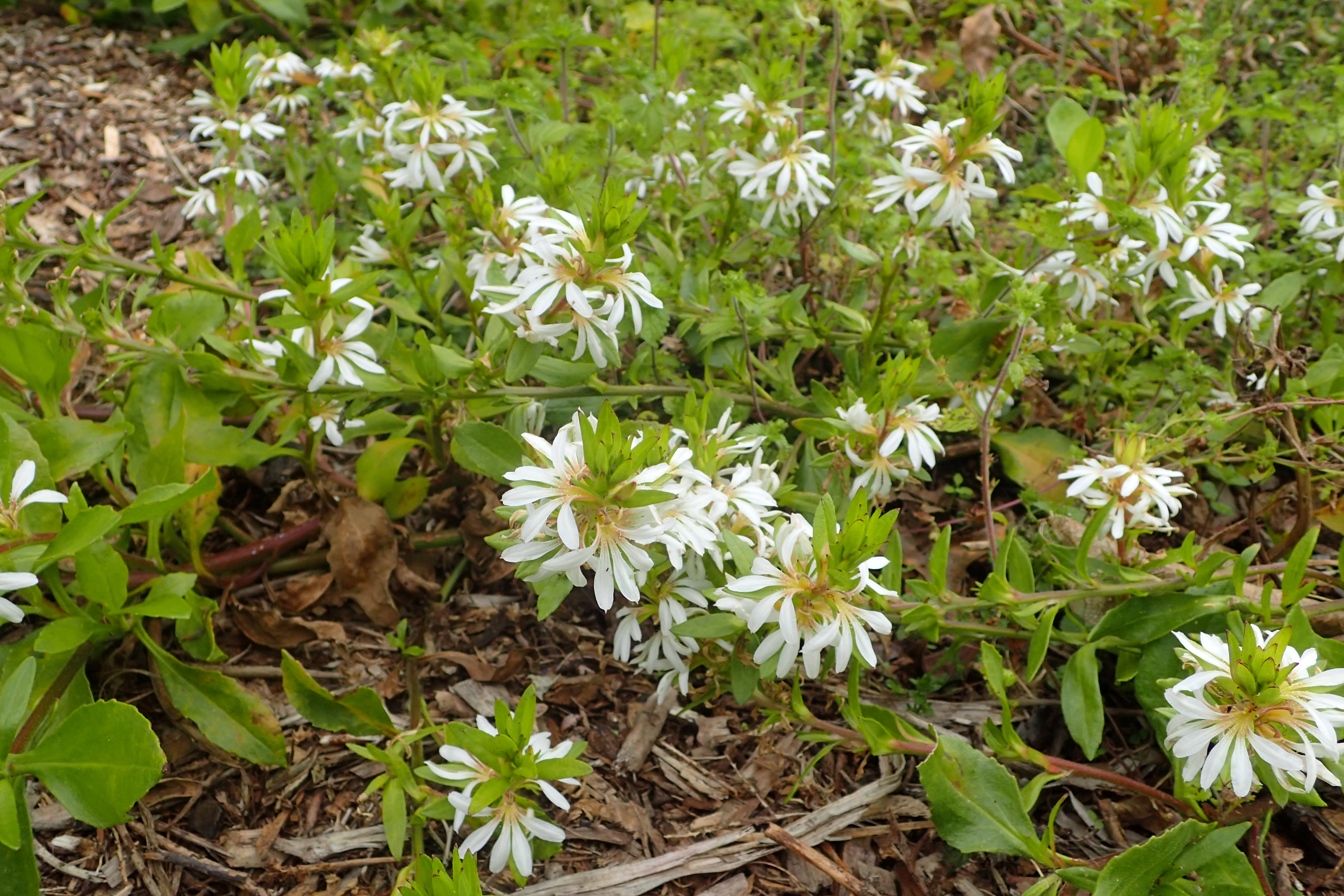

Conservation status
- Naturally Uncommon (NZ TCS)

Scientific classification
- Kingdom: Plantae
- Clade: Tracheophytes
- Clade: Angiosperms
- Clade: Eudicots
- Clade: Asterids
- Order: Asterales
- Family: Goodeniaceae
- Genus: Scaevola
- Species: S. gracilis

Binomial name
- Scaevola gracilis Hook.f.

Synonyms
- Lobelia gracilis (Hook.f.) Kuntze

= Scaevola gracilis =

Species of flowering plant

Scaevola gracilis is a plant in the family Goodeniaceae, native to the Kermadec Islands and Tonga.

It was first described in 1856 by Joseph Dalton Hooker. In 1998, William Russell Sykes united the Tongan Scaevola porrecta with the Kermadec Islands S. gracilis. The specific epithet, gracilis, is a Latin adjective meaning "slender".

== Conservation status ==
In both 2009 and 2012 it was deemed to be "At Risk - Naturally Uncommon" under the New Zealand Threat Classification System, and this New Zealand classification was reaffirmed in 2018 (due to its restricted range), but with the further comment that it is safe overseas.
