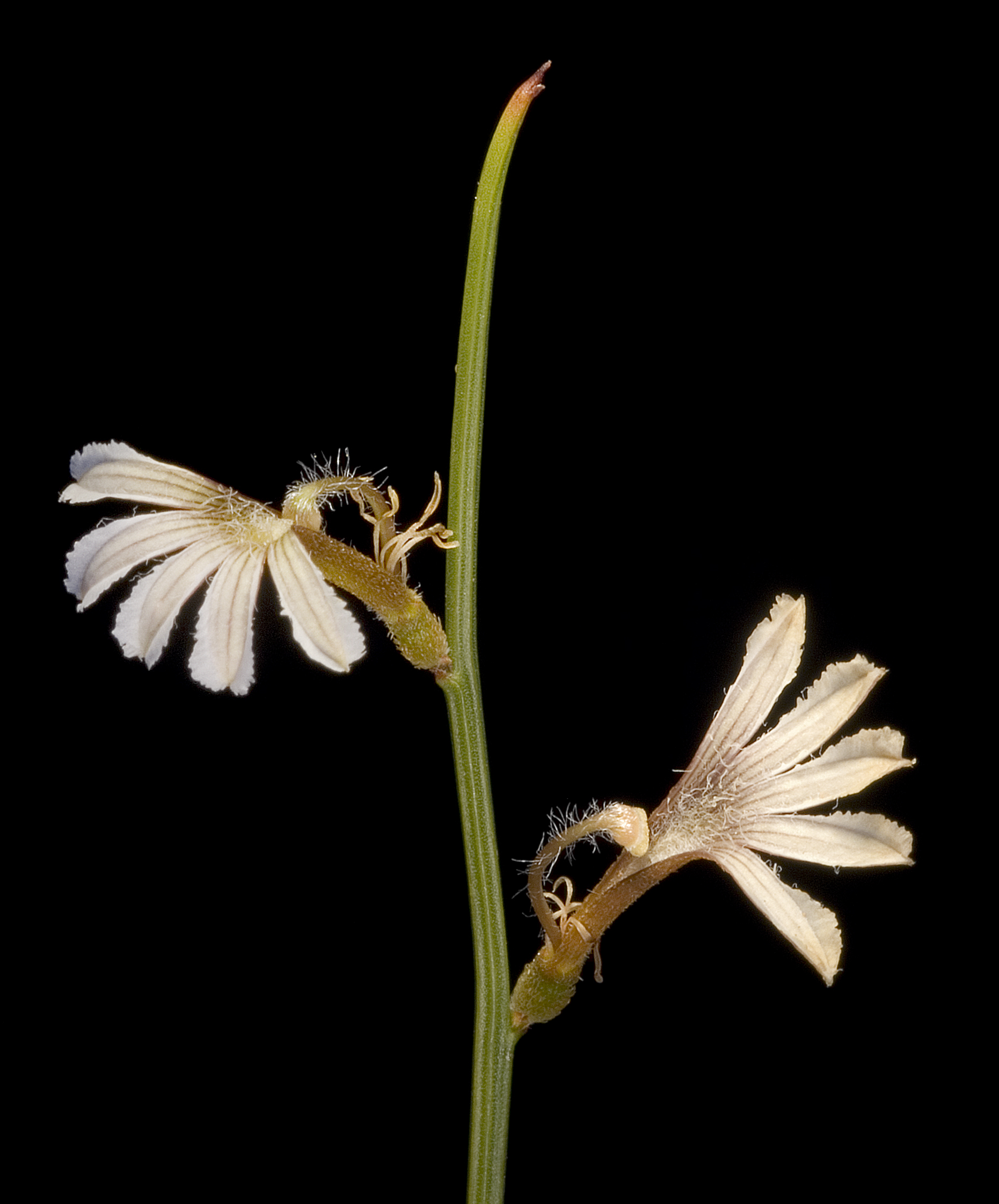

Scientific classification
- Kingdom: Plantae
- Clade: Tracheophytes
- Clade: Angiosperms
- Clade: Eudicots
- Clade: Asterids
- Order: Asterales
- Family: Goodeniaceae
- Genus: Scaevola
- Species: S. restiacea

Binomial name
- Scaevola restiacea Benth.
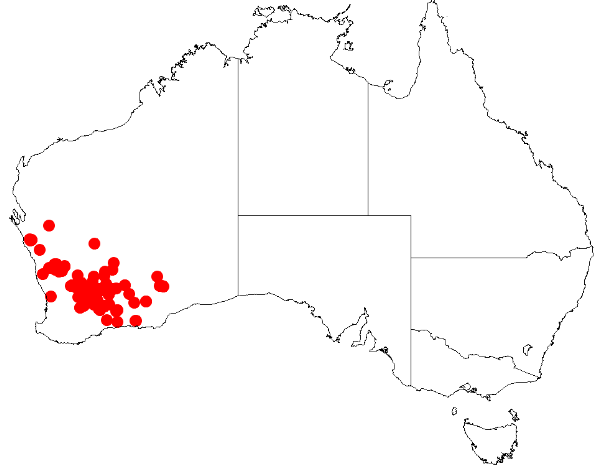
- Occurrence data from Australasian Virtual Herbarium

Synonyms
- Lobelia restiacea Kuntze

= Scaevola restiacea =

Species of shrub

Scaevola restiacea is a shrub in the family Goodeniaceae. It is endemic to the southwest of Western Australia. Plants grow to between 0.15 and 0.5 metres high and have blue-white flowers that can appear in March or June or from August to December in their native range. They are found growing on undulating plains on sandy soils

The species was first formally described in 1868 by English botanist George Bentham.
