= List of Goodenia species =

This is a list of Goodenia species accepted by Plants of the World Online as of March, 2024:

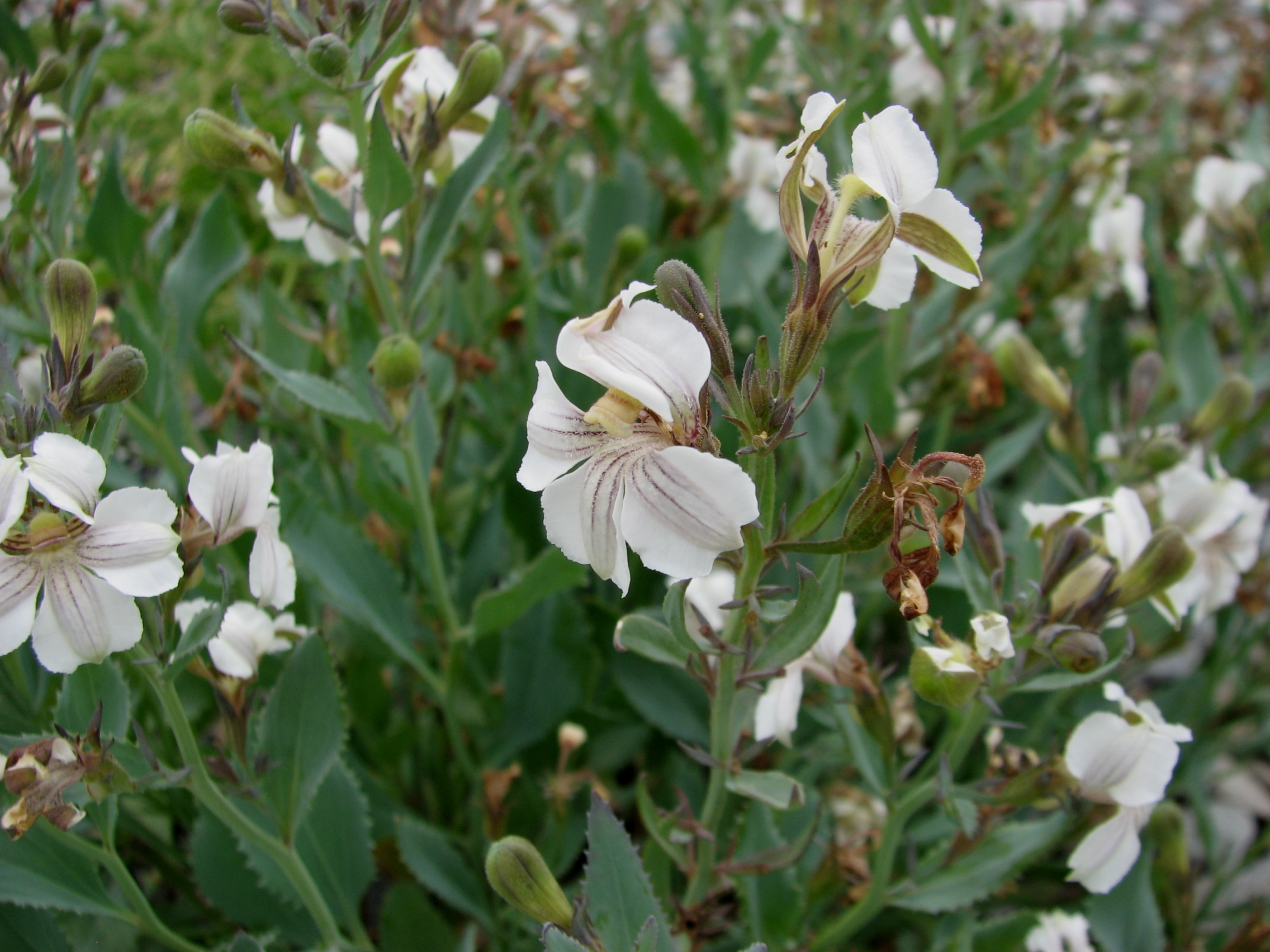
Goodenia albiflora

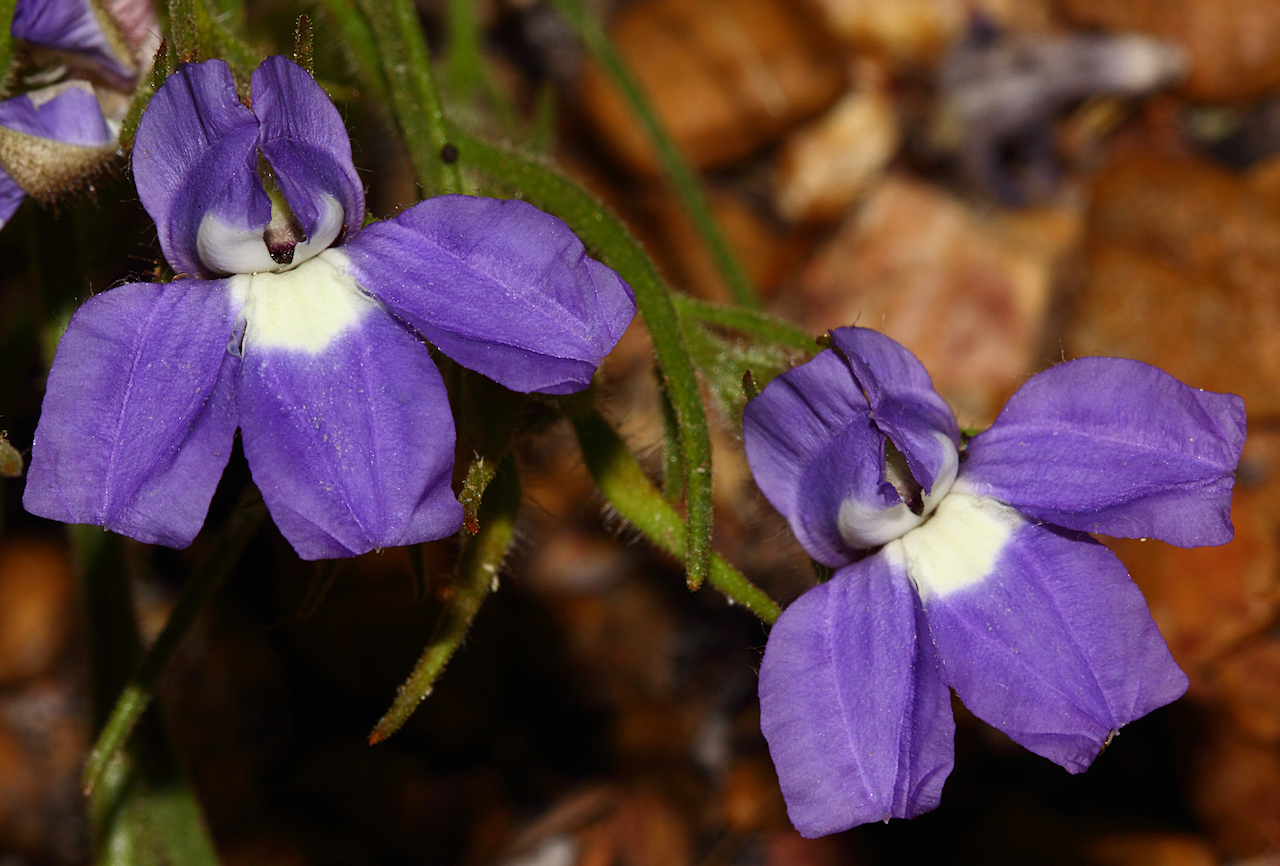
Goodenia arthrotricha

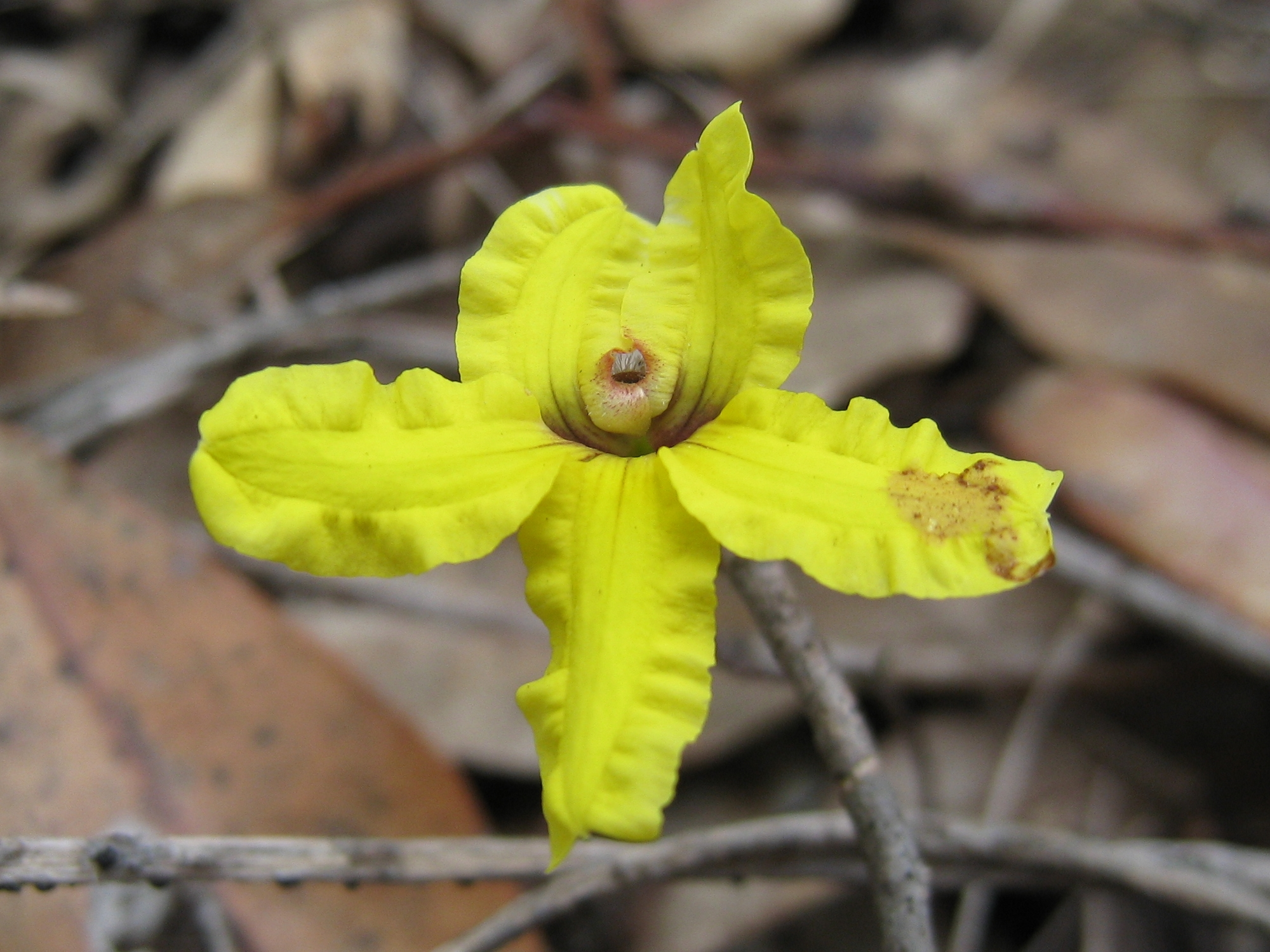
Goodenia hederacea

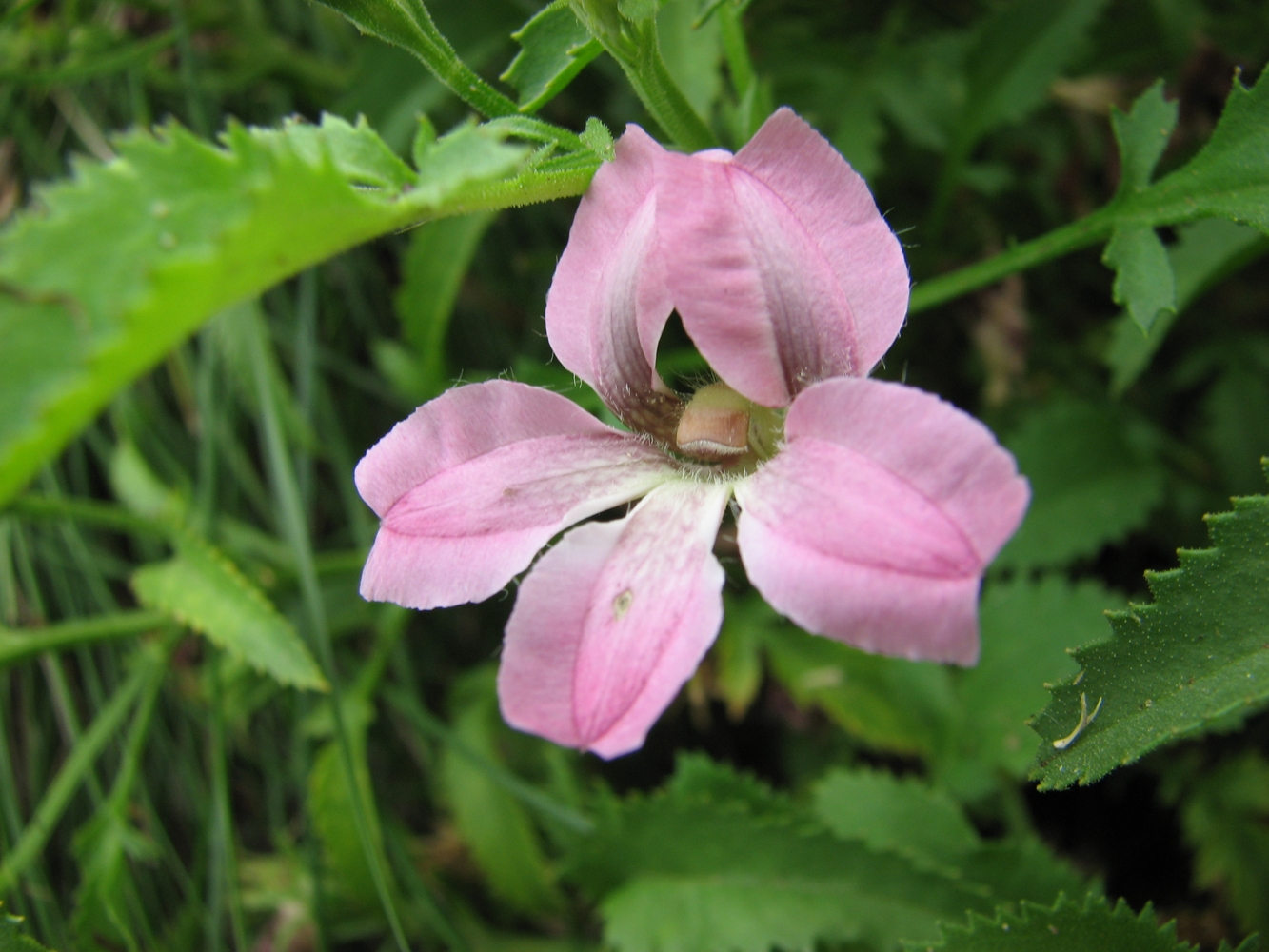
Goodenia macmillanii

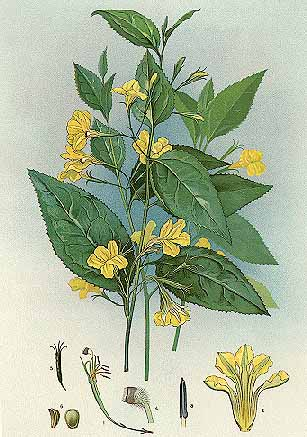
Goodenia ovata

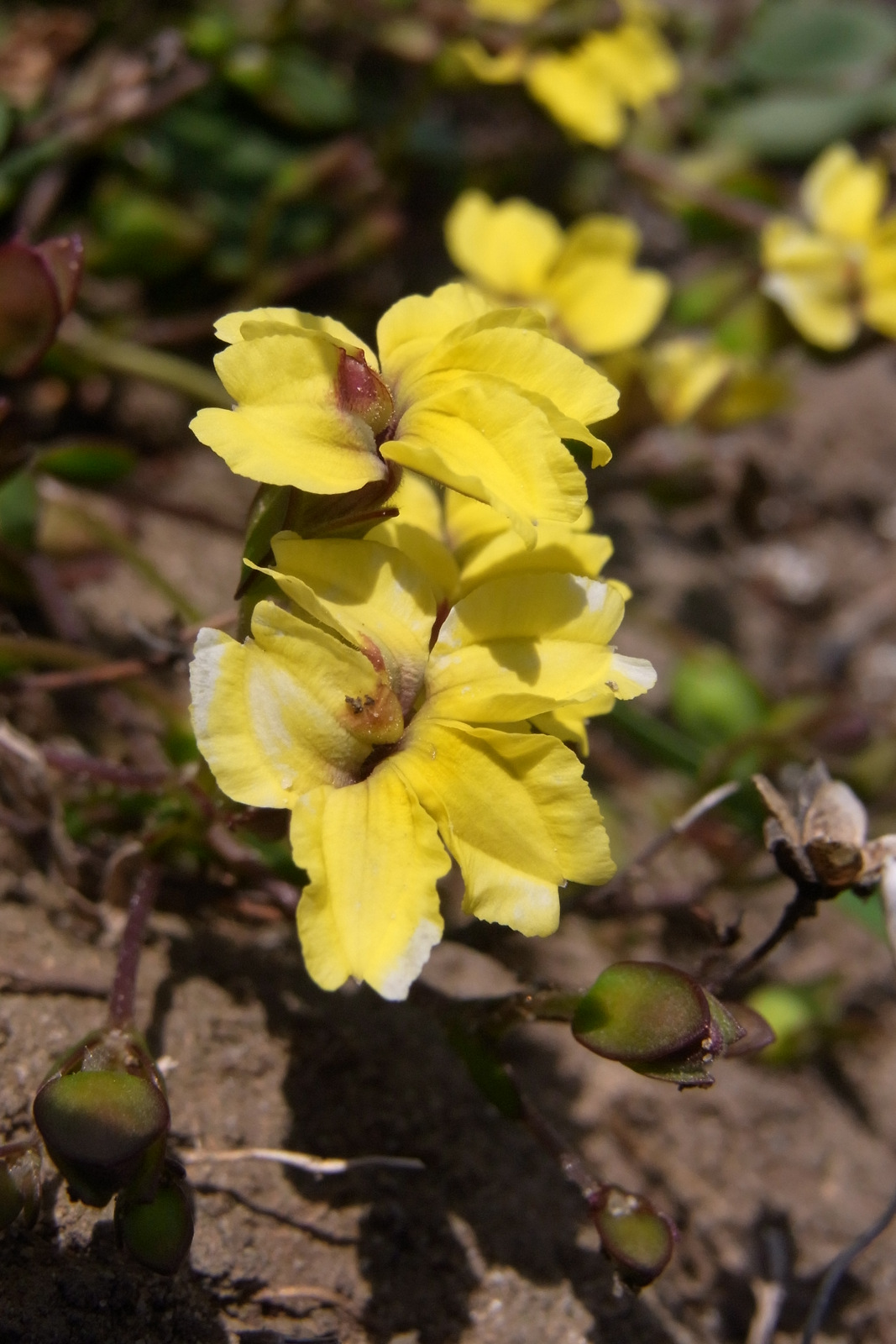
Goodenia paniculata

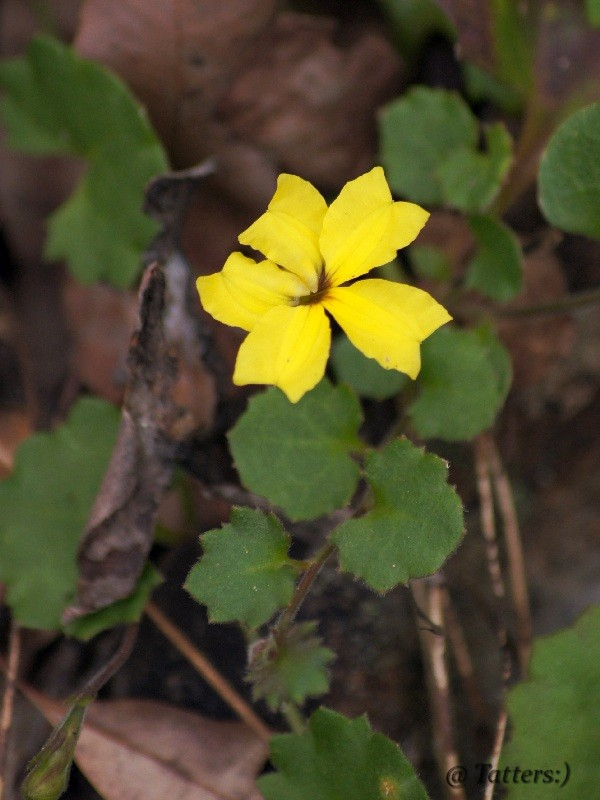
Goodenia rotundifolia

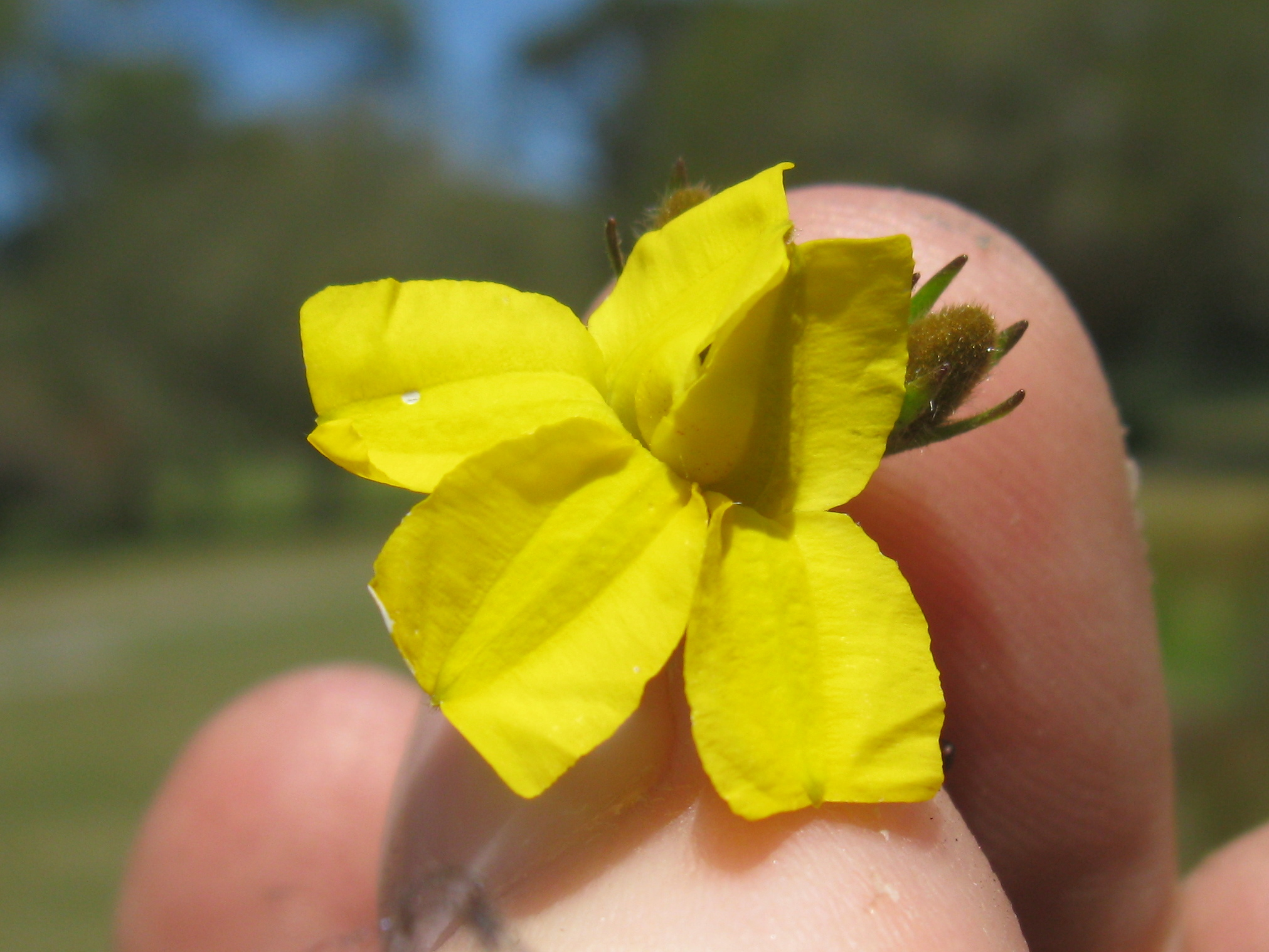
Goodenia stelligera

- Goodenia affinis de Vriese - silver goodenia (W.A.)
- Goodenia albiflora Schltdl. - white goodenia (S.A.)
- Goodenia amplexans F.Muell. - clasping goodenia (S.A.)
- Goodenia anfracta J.M.Black - zig-zag hand-flower (S.A., W.A., N.T.)
- Goodenia angustifolia Carolin (Qld., N.T.)
- Goodenia arachnoidea Carolin (W.A.)
- Goodenia arenicola Carolin (Qld.)
- Goodenia argillacea Carolin (N.T.)
- Goodenia arguta (R.Br.) K.A.Sheph. (N.S.W., Qld., S.A., Vic., W.A.)
- Goodenia armitiana F.Muell. - narrow-leaved goodenia (W.A., N.T., Qld.)
- Goodenia armstrongiana de Vriese (N.T., Qld., New Guinea)
- Goodenia arthrotricha Benth. (W.A.)
- Goodenia asteriscus P.J.Lang (W.A., S.A.)
- Goodenia atriplexifolia A.E.Holland & T.P.Boyle (Qld.)
- Goodenia azurea F.Muell. – blue goodenia (W.A., N.T., Qld.)
- Goodenia bellidifolia Sm. – daisy goodenia (Qld., N.S.W., Vic.)
- Goodenia benthamiana Carolin – small-leaf goodenia (Vic., S.A.)
- Goodenia berardiana (Gaudich.) Carolin (W.A., S.A., N.T., N.S.W.)
- Goodenia berringbinensis Carolin (W.A.)
- Goodenia bicolor F.Muell. ex Benth. (W.A., N.T.)
- Goodenia blackiana Carolin – Black's goodenia (S.A., Vic.)
- Goodenia brachypoda (F.Muell. ex Benth.) Carolin (W.A., N.T.)
- Goodenia brendannarum K.A.Sheph. (W.A.)
- Goodenia brunnea Carolin (S.A., N.T.)
- Goodenia byrnesii Carolin (W.A., N.T., Qld.)
- Goodenia calcarata (F.Muell.) F.Muell. – streaked goodenia (N.T., S.A., Qld., N.S.W.)
- Goodenia cambodiana (Danguy) Kerr (Cambodia, Thailand, Vietnam)
- Goodenia campestris Carolin (W.A., N.T.)
- Goodenia capillosa K.A.Sheph. (W.A., S.A.)
- Goodenia careyi (F.Muell.) K.A.Sheph. (W.A)
- Goodenia caroliniana K.A.Sheph. (Qld., N.S.W.)
- Goodenia centralis Carolin (W.A., S.A., N.T.)
- Goodenia chambersii F.Muell. (S.A.)
- Goodenia chthonocephala Carolin (N.T.)
- Goodenia cirrifica F.Muell. (N.T.)
- Goodenia claytoniacea F.Muell. ex Benth. (W.A.)
- Goodenia coerulea R.Br. (W.A.)
- Goodenia collaris (F.Muell.) K.A.Sheph. (W.A., N.T., S.A., N.S.W.)
- Goodenia concinna Benth. (W.A.)
- Goodenia connata (F.Muell.) K.A.Sheph. (N.S.W., N.T., Qld., S.A., Vic., W.A.)
- Goodenia convexa Carolin (W.A.)
- Goodenia coronopifolia R.Br. (W.A., N.T.)
- Goodenia corralina L.W.Sage & K.A.Sheph. (W.A.)
- Goodenia corynocarpa F.Muell. (W.A.)
- Goodenia cravenii R.L.Barrett & M.D.Barrett (W.A.)
- Goodenia crenata Carolin & L.W.Sage (W.A., N.T.)
- Goodenia cusackiana (F.Muell.) Carolin (W.A.)
- Goodenia cycloptera R.Br. (W.A., N.T., S.A., Qld., N.S.W.)
- Goodenia cycnopotamica (F.Muell.) K.A.Sheph.
- Goodenia cylindrocarpa Albr. (N.T.)
- Goodenia daviesii (F.Muell.) K.A.Sheph. (W.A.)
- Goodenia debilis A.E.Holland & T.P.Boyle (Qld.)
- Goodenia decurrens R.Br. (N.S.W.)
- Goodenia decursiva W.Fitzg. (W.A.)
- Goodenia delicata Carolin (Qld., N.S.W.)
- Goodenia dimorpha Maiden & Betche (N.S.W.)
- Goodenia discophora (F.Muell.) K.A.Sheph. (W.A.)
- Goodenia disperma F.Muell. (Qld.)
- Goodenia drummondii Carolin (W.A.)
- Goodenia durackiana Carolin (W.A., N.T.)
- Goodenia dyeri K.Krause (W.A.)
- Goodenia eatoniana F.Muell. (W.A.)
- Goodenia effusa A.E.Holland (Qld.)
- Goodenia elaiosoma Cowie (N.T.)
- Goodenia elderi F.Muell. & Tate (W.A.)
- Goodenia elongata Labill. – lanky goodenia (N.S.W., Vic., Tas., S.A.)
- Goodenia eremophila E.Pritz. (W.A.)
- Goodenia etheira K.A.Sheph. (W.A.)
- Goodenia exigua F.Muell. (W.A.)
- Goodenia expansa A.E.Holland & T.P.Boyle
- Goodenia fascicularis F.Muell. & Tate – silky goodenia (N.S.W., Vic., Qld., S.A., N.T.)
- Goodenia fasciculata (Benth.) Carolin (W.A.)
- Goodenia faucium Carolin – Mount Liebig goodenia (N.T.)
- Goodenia filiformis R.Br. – thread-leaved goodenia (W.A.)
- Goodenia fordiana Carolin (N.S.W.)
- Goodenia forrestii F.Muell. (W.A.)
- Goodenia geniculata R.Br. – bent goodenia, native primrose (S.A., Vic., Tas.)
- Goodenia gibbosa Carolin (N.T., W.A., S.A.)
- Goodenia glabra R.Br. – shiny pansy, smooth goodenia (W.A., S.A., N.T., Qld., N.S.W.)
- Goodenia glabrata (Carolin) K.A.Sheph. (N.S.W., N.T., Qld., S.A., W.A.)
- Goodenia glandulosa K.Krause (W.A., S.A., N.T.)
- Goodenia glareicola Carolin (W.A.)
- Goodenia glauca F.Muell. – pale goodenia (Qld., N.S.W., Vic., S.A.)
- Goodenia gloeophylla Carolin (W.A., N.T.)
- Goodenia glomerata Maiden & Betche (N.S.W.)
- Goodenia goodeniacea (F.Muell.) Carolin (N.T., Qld.)
- Goodenia gracilis R.Br. – slender goodenia (N.S.W., Vic., Qld., N.T.)
- Goodenia grandiflora Sims – large-flowered goodenia, pinnate goodenia, mountain primrose (N.T., Qld., N.S.W.)
- Goodenia granitica L.W.Sage & K.A.Sheph. (W.A.)
- Goodenia gypsicola Symon (W.A., S.A.)
- Goodenia halophila Albr. (N.T., W.A.)
- Goodenia hartiana L.W.Sage (W.A.)
- Goodenia hassallii F.Muell. (W.A.)
- Goodenia havilandii Maiden & Betche – hill goodenia (N.S.W., Qld., S.A., N.T.)
- Goodenia heatheriana L.W.Sage (W.A.)
- Goodenia hederacea Sm. – forest goodenia, ivy goodenia (Qld., N.S.W., Vic.)
- Goodenia heenanii K.A.Sheph. (N.Z.)
- Goodenia helmsii (E.Pritz.) Carolin (W.A.)
- Goodenia heppleana (W.Fitzg.) Carolin (N.T., W.A.)
- Goodenia heterochila F.Muell. – serrated goodenia (W.A., N.T., S.A., Qld.)
- Goodenia heteromera F.Muell. – spreading goodenia, fan flower (Qld., N.S.W., Vic., S.A.)
- Goodenia heterophylla Sm. (N.S.W., Vic., Qld.)
- Goodenia heterotricha M.D.Barrett & R.L.Barrett (W.A.)
- Goodenia hirsuta F.Muell. (W.A., N.T., S.A., Qld.)
- Goodenia hispida R.Br. (N.T.)
- Goodenia holtzeana (Specht) Carolin (N.T.)
- Goodenia humilis R.Br. – swamp goodenia (Vic., S.A., Tas., N.S.W.)
- Goodenia incana R.Br. (W.A.)
- Goodenia integerrima Carolin (W.A.)
- Goodenia inundata L.W.Sage & J.P.Pigott (W.A.)
- Goodenia iyouta Carolin (W.A.)
- Goodenia janamba Carolin (N.T., W.A., Qld.)
- Goodenia jaurdiensis L.W.Sage & K.A.Sheph. (W.A.)
- Goodenia kakadu Carolin (N.T.)
- Goodenia katabudjar Cranfield & L.W.Sage (W.A.)
- Goodenia kingiana Carolin (W.A.)
- Goodenia konigsbergeri (Backer) Backer ex Bold. (Southeast Asia)
- Goodenia krauseana Carolin (W.A.)
- Goodenia laevis Benth. (W.A.)
- Goodenia lamprosperma F.Muell. (W.A., N.T., Qld.)
- Goodenia lanata R.Br. – trailing goodenia, native primrose (Vic. Tas.)
- Goodenia lancifolia L.W.Sage & Cranfield – scruffy goodenia (W.A.)
- Goodenia larapinta Tate (N.T.)
- Goodenia leiosperma Carolin (N.T.)
- Goodenia leptoclada Benth. – thin-stemmed goodenia (W.A.)
- Goodenia lineata J.H.Willis – Grampians goodenia (Vic.)
- Goodenia lobata Ising (S.A.)
- Goodenia lunata J.M.Black – stiff goodenia (N.S.W., N.T., Qld., S.A., Vic., W.A.)
- Goodenia lyrata Carolin (W.A.)
- Goodenia macbarronii Carolin – narrow goodenia (N.S.W., Vic.)
- Goodenia macmillanii F.Muell. – pinnate goodenia (Vic.)
- Goodenia macrocalyx (de Vriese) K.A.Sheph. (N.T., QLD.)
- Goodenia macrophylla (Lindl.) F.Muell. (W.A.)
- Goodenia macroplectra (F.Muell.) Carolin (W.A.)
- Goodenia maideniana W.Fitzg. (W.A., N.T.)
- Goodenia malvina Carolin (W.A., N.T.)
- Goodenia maretensis R.L.Barrett (W.A.)
- Goodenia megasepala Carolin (Qld.)
- Goodenia micrantha Hemsl. ex Carolin (W.A., S.A.)
- Goodenia microptera F.Muell. (W.A.)
- Goodenia mimuloides S.Moore (W.A.)
- Goodenia minutiflora F.Muell. (N.T., Qld.)
- Goodenia modesta J.M.Black (W.A., N.T., S.A.)
- Goodenia montana (Hook.f.) K.A.Sheph. (N.S.W., Vic., Tas.)
- Goodenia mueckeana F.Muell. (W.A., N.T., S.A.)
- Goodenia muelleriana Carolin (W.A.)
- Goodenia mystrophylla K.A.Sheph. (W.A.)
- Goodenia neglecta (Carolin) Carolin (N.T.)
- Goodenia neogoodenia (C.A.Gardner & A.S.George) Carolin (W.A.)
- Goodenia nigrescens Carolin (N.T., Qld.)
- Goodenia nocoleche Pellow & J.L.Porter (N.S.W.)
- Goodenia nuda E.Pritz. (W.A.)
- Goodenia occidentalis Carolin – western goodenia (W.A., N.T., S.A., N.S.W.)
- Goodenia ochracea Carolin (W.A.)
- Goodenia odonnellii F.Muell. (W.A., N.T., Qld.)
- Goodenia oenpelliensis R.L.Barrett (N.T.)
- Goodenia ovata Sm. (S.A., Qld., N.S.W., Vic., Tas.)
- Goodenia pallida Carolin (W.A.)
- Goodenia panduriformis (A.Cunn. ex Benth.) K.A.Sheph. (W.A., N.T.)
- Goodenia paniculata Sm. – branched goodenia (Qld., N.S.W., Vic.)
- Goodenia paradoxa (R.Br.) K.A.Sheph. (N.S.W., Qld., S.A., Tas., Vic., W.A.)
- Goodenia parvisepta (Carolin) K.A.Sheph. (N.S.W.)
- Goodenia pascua Carolin (W.A.)
- Goodenia peacockiana Carolin (W.A.)
- Goodenia pedicellata L.W.Sage & K.W.Dixon (W.A.)
- Goodenia perfoliata (R.Br.) K.A.Sheph. (N.S.W.)
- Goodenia perryi C.A.Gardner ex Carolin (W.A.)
- Goodenia phillipsiae Carolin (W.A.)
- Goodenia pilosa (R.Br.) Carolin (N.T., Qld., Indonesia, China, Philippines)
- Goodenia pinifolia de Vriese (W.A.)
- Goodenia pinnatifida Schltdl. – cut-leaf goodenia, scrambled eggs, mother ducks (W.A., S.A., Qld., N.S.W., A.C.T., Vic., Tas.)
- Goodenia porphyrea (Carolin) Carolin (N.T.)
- Goodenia potamica Carolin (N.T.)
- Goodenia prostrata Carolin (W.A.)
- Goodenia psammophila L.W.Sage & M.D.Barrett (W.A.)
- Goodenia pterigosperma R.Br. (W.A.)
- Goodenia pulchella Benth. (W.A.)
- Goodenia pumilio R.Br. (W.A., N.T., Qld., New Guinea)
- Goodenia purpurascens R.Br. (W.A., N.T., Qld., New Guinea)
- Goodenia purpurea (F.Muell.) Carolin (N.T.)
- Goodenia pusilla (de Vriese) de Vriese (W.A.)
- Goodenia pusilliflora F.Muell. (W.A., S.A., N.S.W., Vic.)
- Goodenia quadrifida (Carolin) Carolin (N.T.)
- Goodenia quadrilocularis R.Br. (W.A.)
- Goodenia quartzitica K.A.Sheph. (W.A.)
- Goodenia quasilibera Carolin (S.A., W.A.)
- Goodenia racemosa F.Muell. (Qld.)
- Goodenia radicans (Cav.) Pers. (Qld.)
- Goodenia ramelii F.Muell. (W.A., N.T., S.A., Qld.)
- Goodenia redacta Carolin (W.A., N.T., Qld.)
- Goodenia reinwardtii (de Vriese) K.A.Sheph. (W.A.)
- Goodenia robusta (Benth.) K.Krause – woolly goodenia (S.A., Vic.)
- Goodenia rosea (S.Moore) K.A.Sheph. (W.A.)
- Goodenia rostrivalvis Domin (N.S.W.)
- Goodenia rotundifolia R.Br. (Qld., N.S.W.)
- Goodenia rupestris Carolin (N.T.)
- Goodenia saccata Carolin (S.A.)
- Goodenia salina L.W.Sage & K.A.Sheph. (W.A.)
- Goodenia salmoniana (F.Muell.) Carolin (W.A.)
- Goodenia scaevolina F.Muell. (N.T., W.A.)
- Goodenia scapigera R.Br. – white goodenia (W.A.)
- Goodenia schwerinensis Carolin (W.A.)
- Goodenia sepalosa F.Muell. ex Benth. (W.A.)
- Goodenia sericostachya C.A.Gardner – silky-spiked goodenia (W.A.)
- Goodenia splendida A.E.Holland & T.P.Boyle (Qld.)
- Goodenia stellata Carolin (Qld.)
- Goodenia stelligera R.Br. – spiked goodenia (N.S.W., Qld.)
- Goodenia stenophylla F.Muell. (W.A.)
- Goodenia stephensonii F.Muell. (N.S.W.)
- Goodenia stirlingii F.M.Bailey (Qld.)
- Goodenia stobbsiana F.Muell. (W.A.)
- Goodenia strangfordii F.Muell. (N.T., Qld., W.A.)
- Goodenia subauriculata C.T.White (N.T., Qld.)
- Goodenia subsolana K.A.Sheph. (Qld.)
- Goodenia suffrutescens Carolin (W.A.)
- Goodenia symonii (Carolin) Carolin (N.T.)
- Goodenia tenuiloba F.Muell. (W.A.)
- Goodenia trichophylla de Vriese ex Benth. (W.A.)
- Goodenia trinervis (Labill.) K.A.Sheph. (W.A.)
- Goodenia triodiophila Carolin (W.A., S.A., N.T., Qld.)
- Goodenia tripartita Carolin (W.A.)
- Goodenia turleyae L.W.Sage & K.A.Sheph. (W.A.)
- Goodenia valdentata P.J.Lang – Davenport Range goodenia (S.A)
- Goodenia varia R.Br. – sticky goodenia (N.S.W., W.A., S.A.)
- Goodenia vernicosa J.M.Black – wavy goodenia (S.A.)
- Goodenia verreauxii (de Vriese) K.A.Sheph. (W.A.)
- Goodenia vilmoriniae F.Muell. (W.A., S.A., N.T., Qld.)
- Goodenia virgata Carolin (W.A., N.T.)
- Goodenia viridula Carolin (Qld.)
- Goodenia viscida R.Br. – viscid goodenia (W.A.)
- Goodenia viscidula Carolin (N.T., Qld.)
- Goodenia watsonii F.Muell. & Tate (W.A.)
- Goodenia willisiana Carolin (N.S.W., Vic., S.A.)
- Goodenia wilunensis Carolin (W.A.)
- Goodenia xanthosperma F.Muell. (W.A.)
- Goodenia xanthotricha de Vriese (W.A.)
