= Goodenia quadrifida =

Conservation status
- Vulnerable (EPBC Act)

Scientific classification
- Kingdom: Plantae
- Clade: Tracheophytes
- Clade: Angiosperms
- Clade: Eudicots
- Clade: Asterids
- Order: Asterales
- Family: Goodeniaceae
- Genus: Goodenia
- Species: G. quadrifida

Binomial name
- Goodenia quadrifida (Carolin) Carolin

Species of plant

Goodenia quadrifida is a species of flowering plant in the family Goodeniaceae and is endemic to a restricted part of the Northern Territory. It is an ascending herb with glabrous foliage, narrow oblong to lance-shaped leaves at the base of the plant and racemes of purplish-brown flowers.

== Description ==
Goodenia quadrifida is an ascending herb that typically grows to a height of up to 25 cm (9.8 in) long with glabrous foliage. At the base of the plants there are narrow oblong to lance-shaped leaves with the narrower end towards the base, 20–80 mm (0.79–3.15 in) long and 2–4 mm (0.079–0.157 in) wide, but the stem-leaves are smaller. The flowers are arranged in racemes up to 200 mm (7.9 in) long, with leaf-like bracts, each flower on a pedicel 10–22 mm (0.39–0.87 in) long. The sepals are lance-shaped, 1.5–2 mm (0.059–0.079 in) long, the petals purplish-brown and 8–13 mm (0.31–0.51 in) long. The lower lobes of the corolla are 2–4 mm (0.079–0.157 in) long with wings 1–2 mm (0.039–0.079 in) wide. Flowering occurs in May and the fruit is a more or less spherical capsule 2–3 mm (0.079–0.118 in) in diameter. This goodenia is similar to G. purpurea but is distinguished from it by its style that has a four-branched tip.

== Taxonomy and naming ==
This species was first formally described in 1979 by Roger Charles Carolin in the journal Brunonia and given the name Calogyne quadrifida from specimens collected by Norman Byrnes in 1967. In 1990, Carolin changed the name to Goodenia quadrifida in the journal Telopea. The specific epithet (quadrifida) means "split into four parts".

== Distribution and habitat ==
This goodenia grows in cracking black clay soil plains in Arnhem Land where it is a rare species.

== Conservation status ==
Goodenia quadrifida is listed as "vulnerable" under the Australian Government Environment Protection and Biodiversity Conservation Act 1999 but as "data deficient" under the Northern Territory Government Northern Territory Government Territory Parks and Wildlife Conservation Act 1976 because of "the high degree of taxonomic uncertainty" regarding its relation to G. purpurea.
