= Goodenia megasepala =

Scientific classification
- Kingdom: Plantae
- Clade: Tracheophytes
- Clade: Angiosperms
- Clade: Eudicots
- Clade: Asterids
- Order: Asterales
- Family: Goodeniaceae
- Genus: Goodenia
- Species: G. megasepala

Binomial name
- Goodenia megasepala Carolin

Species of plant

Goodenia megasepala is a species of flowering plant in the family Goodeniaceae and is endemic to Queensland. It is a prostrate to low-lying herb with toothed or lobed, lance-shaped to narrow elliptic leaves, and racemes of yellow flowers.

== Description ==
Goodenia megasepala is a prostrate to low-lying herb with stems up to 120 cm (47 in) long and long hairs. The leaves are lance-shaped with the narrower end towards the base, to narrow elliptic, 40–80 mm (1.6–3.1 in) long and 5–25 mm (0.20–0.98 in) wide with toothed or lobed edges. The flowers are arranged in racemes up to 50 mm (2.0 in) long with leaf-like bracts, each flower on a pedicel 4–6 mm (0.16–0.24 in) long. The sepals are lance-shaped, 6–8 mm (0.24–0.31 in) long, the corolla yellow, about 18 mm (0.71 in) long. The lower lobes of the corolla are 6–8 mm (0.24–0.31 in) long with wings about 2 mm (0.079 in) wide. Flowering occurs near August and the fruit is a more or less spherical capsule about 6 mm (0.24 in) in diameter.

== Taxonomy and naming ==
Goodenia megasepala was first formally described in 1980 by Roger Charles Carolin in the journal Telopea from material collected in 1978 by Keith Albert Williams on the Beale Range in Queensland. The specific epithet (megasepala) means "large sepals", distinguishing this species from the similar G. fascicularis.

== Distribution and habitat ==
This goodenia grows in red, sandy soil in central-western Queensland.

== Conservation status ==
Goodenia megasepala is classified as of "least concern" under the Queensland Government Nature Conservation Act 1992.
