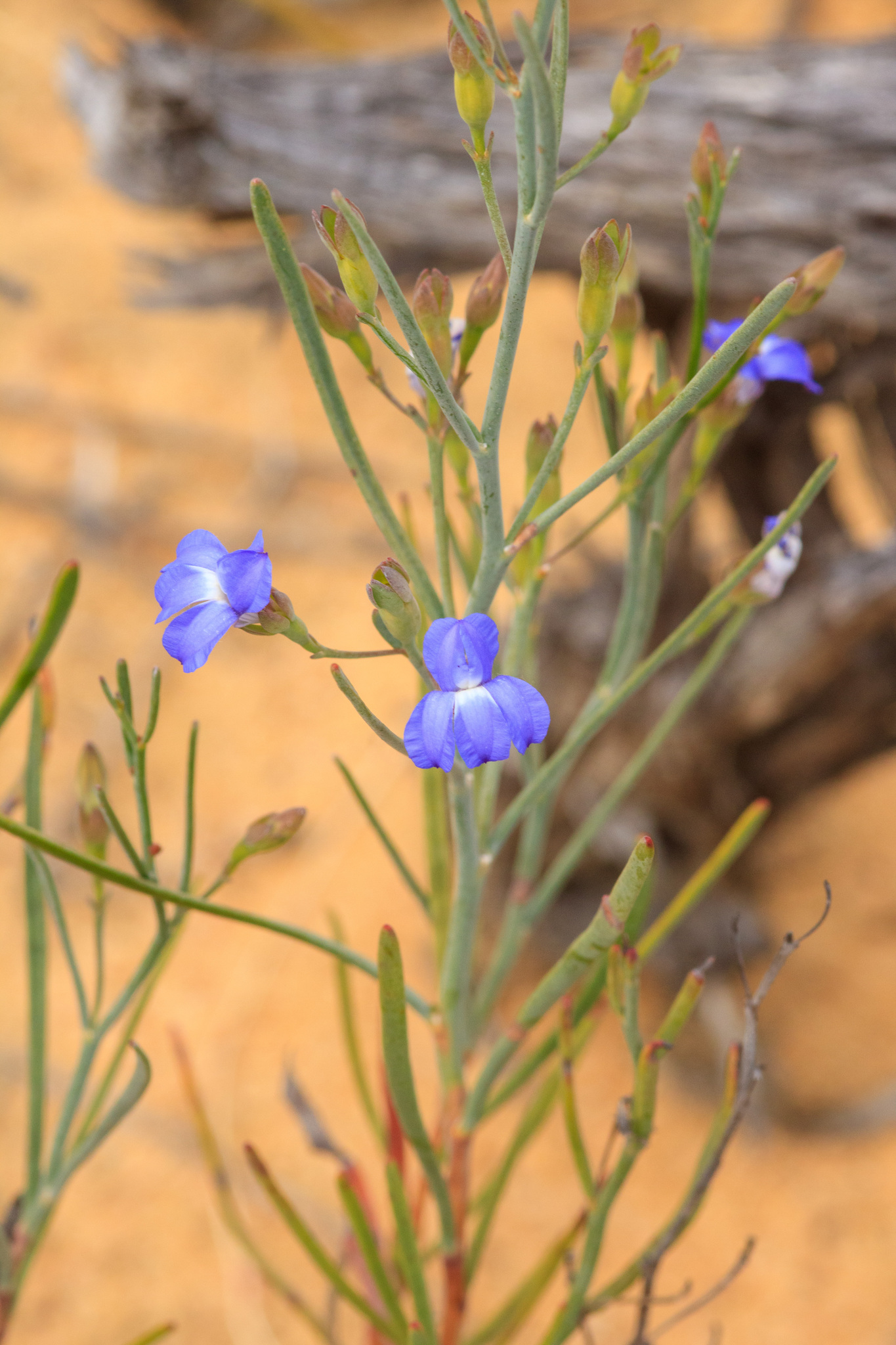

Scientific classification
- Kingdom: Plantae
- Clade: Tracheophytes
- Clade: Angiosperms
- Clade: Eudicots
- Clade: Asterids
- Order: Asterales
- Family: Goodeniaceae
- Genus: Goodenia
- Species: G. hassallii

Binomial name
- Goodenia hassallii F.Muell.

= Goodenia hassallii =

Species of plant

Goodenia hassallii is a species of flowering plant in the family Goodeniaceae and is endemic to the south-west of Western Australia. It is an erect, shrubby perennial with linear to lance-shaped leaves with teeth on the edges, and racemes of blue flowers.

== Description ==
Goodenia hassallii is an erect, glabrous, shrubby perennial up to 50 cm (20 in) tall. The leaves are linear to lance-shaped with the narrower end towards the base, 50–80 mm (2.0–3.1 in) long and 1.5–10 mm (0.059–0.394 in) wide with coarse teeth on the edges. The flowers are arranged in racemes up to 200 mm (7.9 in) long on peduncles 5–15 mm (0.20–0.59 in) long with leaf-like bracts, the individual flowers on pedicels 2–3 mm (0.079–0.118 in) long. The sepals are narrow oblong, about 5 mm (0.20 in) long, the corolla blue, 13–15 mm (0.51–0.59 in) long. The lower lobes of the corolla are 5–7 mm (0.20–0.28 in) long with wings about 2 mm (0.079 in) wide. Flowering occurs from October to January and the fruit is an oval capsule about 6 mm (0.24 in) long.

== Taxonomy and naming ==
Goodenia hassallii was first formally described in 1867 by Ferdinand von Mueller in Fragmenta Phytographiae Australiae from specimens collected by James Drummond. The specific epithet (hassallii) honours Albert Young Hassell.

== Distribution and habitat ==
This goodenia grows in gravelly, sandy soil in the Avon Wheatbelt, Geraldton Sandplains and Jarrah Forest biogeographic regions in the south-west of Western Australia.

== Conservation status ==
Goodenia hassallii is classified as "not threatened" by the Government of Western Australia Department of Parks and Wildlife.
