= Goodenia kakadu =

Scientific classification
- Kingdom: Plantae
- Clade: Tracheophytes
- Clade: Angiosperms
- Clade: Eudicots
- Clade: Asterids
- Order: Asterales
- Family: Goodeniaceae
- Genus: Goodenia
- Species: G. kakadu

Binomial name
- Goodenia kakadu Carolin

Species of plant

Goodenia kakadu is a species of flowering plant in the family Goodeniaceae and is endemic to the Northern Territory. It is a prostrate herb with narrow oblong leaves in rosettes on stolons, and small dark red flowers arranged singly in leaf axils.

== Description ==
Goodenia kakadu is a prostrate herb with stems up to 20 cm (7.9 in) long. The leaves are narrow oblong, up to 3 mm (0.12 in) wide, arranged in rosettes on stolons. The flowers are arranged singly in leaf axils on a pedicel up to 12 mm (0.47 in) long. The sepals are lance-shaped to egg-shaped, 0.5–1.5 mm (0.020–0.059 in) long, the corolla dark red and up to 2 mm (0.079 in) long. The lobes of the corolla are equal, about 1 mm (0.039 in) long and lack wings. Flowering mainly occurs from April to May and the fruit is more or less spherical capsule up to 0.4 mm (0.016 in) in diameter.

== Taxonomy and naming ==
Goodenia kakadu was first formally described in 1990 by Roger Charles Carolin in the journal Telopea from material collected in 1980 in Kakadu National Park by Lyndley Craven. The specific epithet (kakadu) is a reference to the type location.

== Distribution and habitat ==
This goodenia grows in shady, seasonally inundated areas in the northern parts of the Northern Territory.

== Conservation status ==
Goodenia kakaduis classified as "data deficient" under the Northern Territory Government Territory Parks and Wildlife Conservation Act 1976.
