= Goodenia peacockiana =

Scientific classification
- Kingdom: Plantae
- Clade: Tracheophytes
- Clade: Angiosperms
- Clade: Eudicots
- Clade: Asterids
- Order: Asterales
- Family: Goodeniaceae
- Genus: Goodenia
- Species: G. peacockiana

Binomial name
- Goodenia peacockiana Carolin

Species of plant

Goodenia peacockiana is a species of flowering plant in the family Goodeniaceae and is endemic to semi-arid areas of inland Western Australia. It is a prostrate to low-lying annual herb with elliptic to lance-shaped leaves with toothed or lobed edges, and racemes of yellow flowers, often with darker markings.

== Description ==
Goodenia peacockiana is a prostrate to low-lying annual herb with stems up to 25 cm (9.8 in) long. The leaves are mostly at the base of the plant and are elliptic to lance-shaped leaves with the narrower end towards the base, have toothed or lobed edges, and are 20–60 mm (0.79–2.36 in) long, up to 12 mm (0.47 in) wide. The flowers are arranged in racemes up to 200 mm (7.9 in) long on peduncles 5–10 mm (0.20–0.39 in) long with leaf-like bracts and linear bracteoles 3–4 mm (0.12–0.16 in) long, each flower on a pedicel 12–15 mm (0.47–0.59 in) long. The sepals are lance-shaped, about 6 mm (0.24 in) long, the petals yellow, often with darker markings, and about 15 mm (0.59 in) long. The lower lobes of the corolla are 8–11 mm (0.31–0.43 in) long with wings about 2.5 mm (0.098 in) wide. Flowering mainly occurs from June to October and the fruit is an oval or cylindrical capsule about 10 mm (0.39 in) long.

== Taxonomy and naming ==
Goodenia peacockiana was first formally described in 1980 by Roger Charles Carolin in the journal Telopea from material he collected on the road between Yelma and Leonora in 1967. The specific epithet (peacockiana) William James Peacock (born 1937), a friend of Carolin who was a molecular biologist at the CSIRO.

== Distribution and habitat ==
This goodenia grows on sandplains in semi-arid inland areas of Western Australia.

== Conservation status ==
Goodenia peacockiana is classified as "not threatened" by the Government of Western Australia Department of Parks and Wildlife.
