= Goodenia heatheriana =

Hart's goodenia

Conservation status
- Priority One — Poorly Known Taxa (DEC)

Scientific classification
- Kingdom: Plantae
- Clade: Tracheophytes
- Clade: Angiosperms
- Clade: Eudicots
- Clade: Asterids
- Order: Asterales
- Family: Goodeniaceae
- Genus: Goodenia
- Species: G. heatheriana

Binomial name
- Goodenia heatheriana L.W.Sage

Species of plant

Goodenia heatheriana is a species of flowering plant in the family Goodeniaceae and is endemic to Western Australia. It is a spreading annual herb with narrow egg-shaped leaves at the base of the plant and racemes of yellow flowers.

== Description ==
Goodenia heatheriana is a spreading annual herb that typically grows to a height of 15 cm (5.9 in). The leaves are mostly near the base of the plant, narrow egg-shaped, sometimes lobed, 4–21 mm (0.16–0.83 in) long and 2–10 mm (0.079–0.394 in) wide. The flowers are arranged in racemes up to 70 mm (2.8 in) long, the flowers mostly solitary on a pedicel 13–42 mm (0.51–1.65 in) long with leaf-like bracts 7–10 mm (0.28–0.39 in) long and 0.5–5 mm (0.020–0.197 in) wide. The sepals are narrow egg-shaped, about 2 mm (0.079 in) long and the corolla is yellow, about 10 mm (0.39 in) long. The lower lobes of the corolla are about 3.5 mm (0.14 in) long with wings about 1.5 mm (0.059 in) wide. Flowering has been observed in late September and October and the fruit is an elliptic capsule about 1 mm (0.039 in) long.

== Taxonomy and naming ==
Goodenia heatheriana was first formally described in 2000 by Leigh William Sage in the journal Nuytsia from specimens collected in the Parker Range in 1994. The specific epithet (heatheriana) honours Heather Sage, the wife of the author.

== Distribution and habitat ==
This goodenia grows in low, open eucalypt woodland near Marvel Loch in the Coolgardie biogeographic region of Western Australia.

== Conservation status ==
Goodenia heatheriana is classified as "Priority One" by the Government of Western Australia Department of Parks and Wildlife, meaning that it is known from only one or a few locations which are potentially at risk.
