= Goodenia halophila =

Scientific classification
- Kingdom: Plantae
- Clade: Tracheophytes
- Clade: Angiosperms
- Clade: Eudicots
- Clade: Asterids
- Order: Asterales
- Family: Goodeniaceae
- Genus: Goodenia
- Species: G. halophila

Binomial name
- Goodenia halophila Albr.

Species of plant

Goodenia halophila is a species of flowering plant in the family Goodeniaceae and is endemic to the northern Australia. It is a delicate annual herb with spatula-shaped, or lance-shaped leaves in a tuft at the base of erect or low-lying flowering stems, and cymes of yellow flowers.

== Description ==
Goodenia halophila is a delicate annual herb that has a tuft of leaves at the base of erect or low-lying flowering stems up to 350 mm (14 in) long. The leaves are spatula-shaped to lance-shaped with the narrower end towards the base, 7–60 mm (0.28–2.36 in) long and 2–18 mm (0.079–0.709 in) wide usually with toothed edges, the leaves on stems similar but smaller. The flowers are arranged in cymes along zig-zag flowering stems with leaf-like bracts, each flower on a pedicel about 10 mm (0.39 in) long. The sepals are lance-shaped, 1.7–2.5 mm (0.067–0.098 in) long, the petals yellow, 7–10 mm (0.28–0.39 in) long, the lower lobes with wings about 0.8–1.5 mm (0.031–0.059 in) wide. Flowering has been recorded from May to August and the fruit is an elliptic to narrow oval capsule 3–4 mm (0.12–0.16 in) long and about 2 mm (0.079 in) wide.

== Taxonomy and naming ==
Goodenia halophila was first formally described in 2002 by David Edward Albrecht in the journal Nuytsia from specimens collected by Peter Latz near Rabbit Flat in the Northern Territory in 1980. The specific epithet (halophila) means "salt-loving", referring to the habitat preference of this goodenia.

== Distribution and habitat ==
This goodenia grows in low-lying saline areas in arid areas of the Northern Territory and in the Great Sandy Desert in Western Australia.

== Conservation status ==
Goodenia halophila is listed as of "least concern" under the Northern Territory Government Territory Parks and Wildlife Conservation Act 1976. but as "Priority Three" by the Government of Western Australia Department of Parks and Wildlife, meaning that it is poorly known and known from only a few locations but is not under imminent threat.
