= Goodenia redacta =

Scientific classification
- Kingdom: Plantae
- Clade: Tracheophytes
- Clade: Angiosperms
- Clade: Eudicots
- Clade: Asterids
- Order: Asterales
- Family: Goodeniaceae
- Genus: Goodenia
- Species: G. redacta

Binomial name
- Goodenia redacta Carolin

Species of plant

Goodenia redacta is a species of flowering plant in the family Goodeniaceae and is endemic to northern Australia. It is a prostrate to low-lying herb with toothed, egg-shaped leaves at the base of the plant, and racemes of yellow flowers with a brownish centre.

== Description ==
Goodenia redacta is a prostrate to low-lying herb with stems up to 15 cm (5.9 in) and soft hairs on the foliage. The leaves at the base of the plant are egg-shaped with the narrower end towards the base, 25–50 mm (0.98–1.97 in) long and 10–15 mm (0.39–0.59 in) wide with toothed edges. The flowers are arranged in leafy racemes up to 150 mm (5.9 in) long on the ends of the stems, with leaf-like bracts, each flower on a pedicel 5–10 mm (0.20–0.39 in) long. The sepals are 1–6 mm (0.039–0.236 in) long but of different lengths, the petals yellow with a brownish centre and 6–7 mm (0.24–0.28 in) long. The lower lobes of the corolla are about 2.5 mm (0.098 in) long with wings up to 1 mm (0.039 in) wide. Flowering mainly occurs from April to May.

== Taxonomy and naming ==
Goodenia redacta was first formally described in 1990 by Roger Charles Carolin in the journal Telopea from a specimen collected in 1891 by Joseph Bradshaw and William Allen at a location they thought was the Prince Albert River. The specific epithet (redacta) means "reduced", referring to the small upper lobes of the corolla.

== Distribution ==
This goodenia grows in sandy soil, often on sandstone hills and occurs in the Kimberley region of Western Australia, Arnhem Land in the Northern Territory and the Cape York Peninsula in Queensland.

== Conservation status ==
Goodenia redacta is classified as "not threatened" by the Government of Western Australia Department of Parks and Wildlife and as of "least concern" under the Queensland Government Nature Conservation Act 1992 and the Northern Territory Government Territory Parks and Wildlife Conservation Act 1976.
