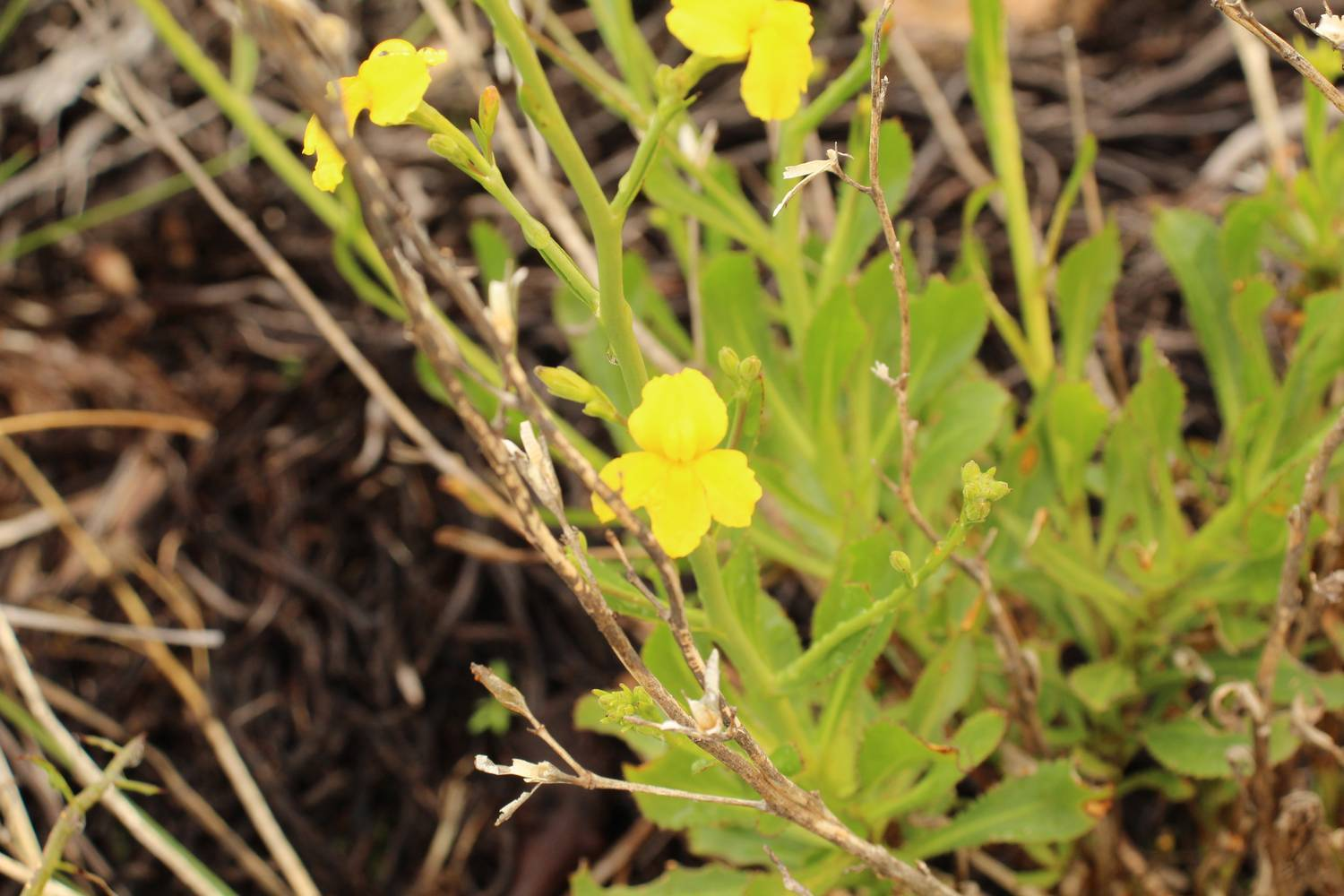

Conservation status
- Priority Two — Poorly Known Taxa (DEC)

Scientific classification
- Kingdom: Plantae
- Clade: Tracheophytes
- Clade: Angiosperms
- Clade: Eudicots
- Clade: Asterids
- Order: Asterales
- Family: Goodeniaceae
- Genus: Goodenia
- Species: G. quadrilocularis

Binomial name
- Goodenia quadrilocularis R.Br.

Synonyms
- Goodenia cyanea F.Muell.

= Goodenia quadrilocularis =

Species of plant

Goodenia quadrilocularis is a species of flowering plant in the family Goodeniaceae and is endemic to south-coastal areas in the south-west of Western Australia. It is an erect, woody perennial herb with egg-shaped to lance-shaped leaves with toothed edges, and racemes of yellow flowers.

== Description ==
Goodenia quadrilocularis is an erect, woody perennial herb that typically grows to a height of 50 cm (20 in) and is more or less glabrous. The leaves are egg-shaped to lance-shaped with the narrower end towards the base, mostly arranged at the base of the plant, 30–50 mm (1.2–2.0 in) long and 10–17 mm (0.39–0.67 in) wide, with toothed edges. The flowers are arranged in racemes up to 300 mm (12 in) long, with lance-shaped bracts 5–20 mm (0.20–0.79 in) long and lance-shaped bracteoles 2–5 mm (0.079–0.197 in) long. Each flower is on a pedicel 2–5 mm (0.079–0.197 in) long with lance-shaped sepals about 5 mm (0.20 in) long. The petals are yellow, about 20 mm (0.79 in) long, the lower lobes of the corolla about 7 mm (0.28 in) long with wings 2–2.5 mm (0.079–0.098 in) wide. Flowering occurs from September to December and the fruit is a cylindrical capsule about 15 mm (0.59 in) long.

== Taxonomy and naming ==
Goodenia quadrilocularis was first formally described in 1810 by Robert Brown in his Prodromus Florae Novae Hollandiae et Insulae Van Diemen. The specific epithet (quadrilocularis) refers to the four locules of the fruit.

== Distribution and habitat ==
This goodenia grows on sand dunes and granite outcrops mostly near Cape Le Grand.

== Conservation status ==
Goodenia quadrilocularisis classified as "Priority Two" by the Western Australian Government Department of Parks and Wildlife meaning that it is poorly known and from only one or a few locations.
