= Goodenia argillacea =

Scientific classification
- Kingdom: Plantae
- Clade: Tracheophytes
- Clade: Angiosperms
- Clade: Eudicots
- Clade: Asterids
- Order: Asterales
- Family: Goodeniaceae
- Genus: Goodenia
- Species: G. argillacea

Binomial name
- Goodenia argillacea Carolin

Species of plant

Goodenia argillacea is a species of flowering plant in the family Goodeniaceae and is endemic to the Northern Territory. It is a herb with an erect stem and weak, lying branches, oblong to linear leaves on the stems, and racemes of brownish-yellow flowers.

== Description ==
Goodenia argillacea is a herb that typically grows to a height of up to 70 cm (28 in), with an erect main stem and weak, low-lying branches. The leaves are arranged along the stems and are oblong to linear, 20–45 mm (0.79–1.77 in) long and 2.5–6 mm (0.098–0.236 in) wide. The flowers are arranged in racemes up to 600 mm (24 in) long on pedicels 2.5–4 mm (0.098–0.157 in) long. The sepals are lance-shaped, about 2.5 mm (0.098 in) long, the corolla brownish-yellow and 10–12 mm (0.39–0.47 in) long. The lower lobes of the corolla are about 2.5 mm (0.098 in) long with wings about 1 mm (0.039 in) wide. Flowering mainly occurs around May and the fruit is an oval capsule 3–3.5 mm (0.12–0.14 in) long.

== Taxonomy and naming ==
Goodenia argillacea was first formally described in 1990 by Roger Charles Carolin in the journal Telopea from material he collected in 1974. The specific epithet (argillacea) means "pertaining to clay", referring to the habitat of the type specimens.

== Distribution and habitat ==
This goodenia grows in Melaleuca scrub in heavy clay soil.

== Conservation status ==
Goodenia argillaceais classified as "data deficient" under the Northern Territory Government Territory Parks and Wildlife Conservation Act 1976.
