= Goodenia trichophylla =

Scientific classification
- Kingdom: Plantae
- Clade: Tracheophytes
- Clade: Angiosperms
- Clade: Eudicots
- Clade: Asterids
- Order: Asterales
- Family: Goodeniaceae
- Genus: Goodenia
- Species: G. trichophylla

Binomial name
- Goodenia trichophylla de Vriese ex Benth.

Species of plant

Goodenia trichophylla is a species of flowering plant in the family Goodeniaceae and is endemic to the southwest of Western Australia. It is an erect to ascending herb with sticky or shiny, linear leaves at the base of the plant and racemes of blue flowers.

== Description ==
Goodenia trichophylla is an erect to ascending herb that typically grows to a height of up to 30 cm (12 in) with sticky or shiny foliage covered with flattened, shield-like hairs. The leaves at the base of the plant are linear, 20–40 mm (0.79–1.57 in) long and about 2 mm (0.079 in) wide. The flowers are arranged in racemes up to 200 mm (7.9 in) long on peduncles 5–9 mm (0.20–0.35 in) long with leaf-like bracts and linear bracteoles 1.0–1.2 mm (0.039–0.047 in) long. The sepals are lance-shaped, 1.0–1.5 mm (0.039–0.059 in) long, the corolla blue and 8–12 mm (0.31–0.47 in) long. The lower lobes of the corolla are 4–5 mm (0.16–0.20 in) long with wings about 1 mm (0.039 in) wide. Flowering mainly occurs from August to December and the fruit is an oblong to oval capsule 5–6 mm (0.20–0.24 in) long.

== Taxonomy and naming ==
Goodenia trichophylla was first formally described in 1886 by George Bentham in Flora Australiensis from an unpublished description by Willem Hendrik de Vriese. The specific epithet (trichophylla) means "hair-leaved".

== Distribution and habitat ==
This goodenia grows in sandy soil in the south-west of Western Australia.

== Conservation status ==
Goodenia trichophylla is classified as "not threatened" by the Department of Biodiversity, Conservation and Attractions.
