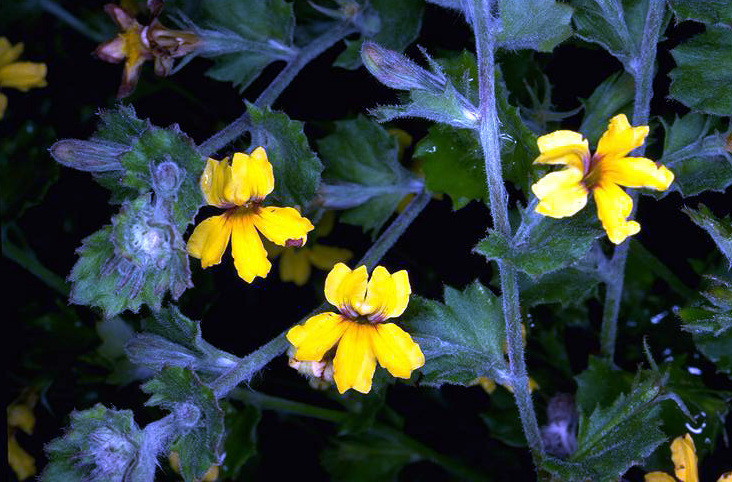
- In the Australian National Botanic Gardens

Scientific classification
- Kingdom: Plantae
- Clade: Tracheophytes
- Clade: Angiosperms
- Clade: Eudicots
- Clade: Asterids
- Order: Asterales
- Family: Goodeniaceae
- Genus: Goodenia
- Species: G. rotundifolia

Binomial name
- Goodenia rotundifolia R.Br.

Synonyms
- Goodenia rotundifolia var. glaberrima R.Br. nom. inval.; Goodenia rotundifolia var. hirsuta Domin nom. illeg.; Goodenia rotundifolia var. pubescens R.Br.; Goodenia rotundifolia R.Br. var. rotundifolia; Goodenia rotundifolia var. typica Domin nom. inval.; Goodenia strongylophylla F.Muell.

= Goodenia rotundifolia =

Species of plant

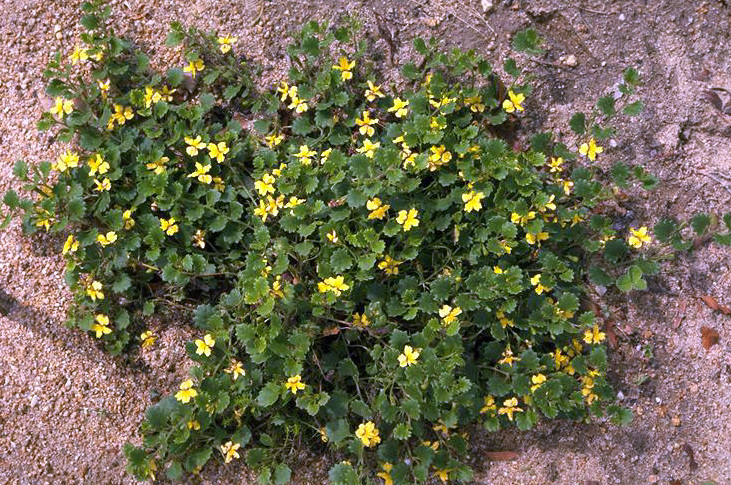
Habit

Goodenia rotundifolia is a species of flowering plant in the family Goodeniaceae and is endemic to eastern Australia. It is a prostrate to erect perennial herb with more or less round, toothed leaves and racemes of yellow flowers.

== Description ==
Goodenia rotundifolia is prostrate to erect perennial herb that typically grows to a height of up to 50 cm (20 in). The leaves are mostly at the base of the plant, more or less round to egg-shaped with the narrower end towards the base, 8–20 mm (0.31–0.79 in) long and 5–20 mm (0.20–0.79 in) wide with toothed, sometimes wavy edges. The flowers are arranged in racemes up to 300 mm (12 in) long on a peduncle 8–23 mm (0.31–0.91 in) long with leaf-like bracts, each flower on a pedicel up to 2 mm (0.079 in) long with linear bracteoles about 5 mm (0.20 in) long. The sepals are linear to lance-shaped, 5–7.5 mm (0.20–0.30 in) long and the petals are yellow, 12–16 mm (0.47–0.63 in) long. The lower lobes of the corolla are 5–6 mm (0.20–0.24 in) long with wings 0.8–1.5 mm (0.031–0.059 in) wide. Flowering mainly occurs from September to May and the fruit is a more or less spherical capsule 5–7 mm (0.20–0.28 in) in diameter.

== Taxonomy and naming ==
Goodenia rotundifolia was first formally described in 1810 by Robert Brown in his Prodromus Florae Novae Hollandiae et Insulae Van Diemen. The specific epithet (rotundifolia) means "circular-leaved".

== Distribution and habitat ==
This goodenia grows in woodland and forest on the coast and tablelands from southern Queensland to the Hunter Valley in New South Wales.
