= Goodenia porphyrea =

Scientific classification
- Kingdom: Plantae
- Clade: Tracheophytes
- Clade: Angiosperms
- Clade: Eudicots
- Clade: Asterids
- Order: Asterales
- Family: Goodeniaceae
- Genus: Goodenia
- Species: G. porphyrea

Binomial name
- Goodenia porphyrea (Carolin) Carolin

Species of plant

Goodenia porphyrea is a species of flowering plant in the family Goodeniaceae and is endemic to the northern parts of the Northern Territory. It is a low-lying to prostrate herb with stiff hairs, and with egg-shaped leaves at the base of the plant and racemes of purplish to apricot or brownish flowers.

== Description ==
Goodenia porphyrea is a low-lying to prostrate herb with stems up to 50 cm (20 in) long with scattered, stiff, white hairs on the foliage. At the base of the plants there are egg-shaped leaves with the narrower end towards the base, but the stem-leaves are narrow oblong to lance-shaped 250–110 mm (9.8–4.3 in) long and 2–5 mm (0.079–0.197 in) wide with toothed edges and two large teeth at the base. The flowers are arranged in racemes up to 400 mm (16 in) long, with leaf-like bracts, each flower on a pedicel up to 10 mm (0.39 in) long. The sepals are narrow oblong to lance-shaped, 4–5 mm (0.16–0.20 in) long, the petals purplish to apricot or brownish, 8–10 mm (0.31–0.39 in) long. The lower lobes of the corolla are 2–3 mm (0.079–0.118 in) long with wings about 1 mm (0.039 in) wide. Flowering mostly occurs from March to April and the fruit is a more or less spherical capsule 5–6 mm (0.20–0.24 in) in diameter.

== Taxonomy and naming ==
This species was first formally described in 1979 by Roger Charles Carolin in the journal Brunonia and given the name Calogyne porphyrea from specimens collected in 1966. In 1990, Carolin changed the name to Goodenia porphyrea in the journal Telopea. The specific epithet (porphyrea) means "purple or purplish-red".

== Distribution and habitat ==
This goodenia grows in grassy woodland on black soil plains and on the edges of swamps and saline coastal flats in northern parts of the Northern Territory.

== Conservation status ==
Goodenia holtzeana is list as of "least concern" under the Northern Territory Government Territory Parks and Wildlife Conservation Act 1976.
