= Goodenia granitica =

Conservation status
- Priority Two — Poorly Known Taxa (DEC)

Scientific classification
- Kingdom: Plantae
- Clade: Tracheophytes
- Clade: Angiosperms
- Clade: Eudicots
- Clade: Asterids
- Order: Asterales
- Family: Goodeniaceae
- Genus: Goodenia
- Species: G. granitica

Binomial name
- Goodenia granitica L.W.Sage & K.A.Sheph.

Species of plant

Goodenia granitica is a species of flowering plant in the family Goodeniaceae and endemic to the south-west of Western Australia. It is an annual herb with spatula-shaped, sometimes lobed leaves, in a rosette at the base of the plant, and racemes of yellow flowers.

== Description ==
Goodenia granitica is an annual herb that typically grows to a height of 5–35 cm (2.0–13.8 in) and has hairy foliage. The leaves are arranged in a rosette at the base of the plant and are spatula-shaped, 6–115 mm (0.24–4.53 in) long and 1.8–16 mm (0.071–0.630 in) wide, sometimes lyre-shaped with lobes 6–13 mm (0.24–0.51 in) long and 0.5–3 mm (0.020–0.118 in) wide. The flowers are arranged in a raceme of three to twenty-four, 42–432 mm (1.7–17.0 in) long on a peduncle 30–130 mm (1.2–5.1 in) long, each flower on a pedicel 9–45 mm (0.35–1.77 in) long with leaf-like bracts at the base. The sepals are narrow egg-shaped, 3–4.2 mm (0.12–0.17 in) long and the corolla yellow and 13–15 mm (0.51–0.59 in) long. The lower lobes of the corolla are 2–3 mm (0.079–0.118 in) long with wings 2.5–4 mm (0.098–0.157 in) wide. Flowering occurs from November to February and the fruit is a more or less spherical capsule up to 3 mm (0.12 in) in diameter.

== Taxonomy and naming ==
Goodenia granitica was first formally described in 2007 by Leigh William Sage and Kelly Anne Shepherd in the journal Nuytsia from material collected by Sage near Chiddarcooping Hill in 2001. The specific epithet (granitica) refers to the plant's growing near granite outcrops.

== Distribution and habitat ==
This goodenia is only known from three populations in the Avon Wheatbelt biogeographic region, where it grows in moist soil near the base of granite outcrops and on valley floors.

== Conservation status ==
Goddenia granitica is classified as "Priority Two" by the Western Australian Government Department of Parks and Wildlife meaning that it is poorly known and from only one or a few locations.
