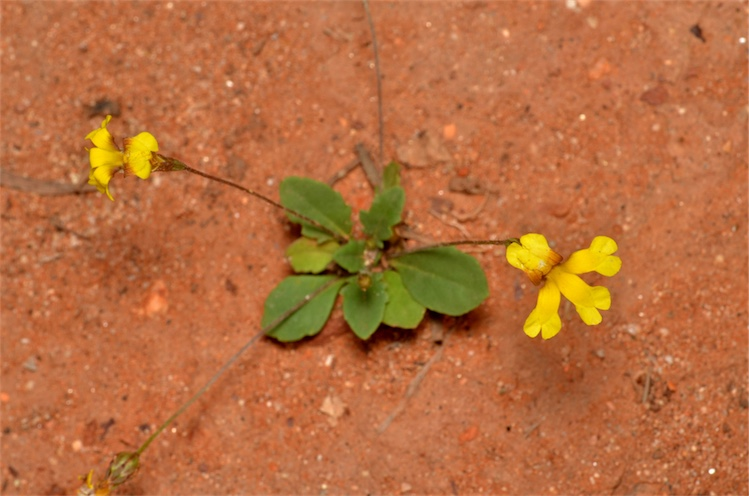
- In the MacDonnell Ranges

Conservation status
- Priority Three — Poorly Known Taxa (DEC)

Scientific classification
- Kingdom: Plantae
- Clade: Tracheophytes
- Clade: Angiosperms
- Clade: Eudicots
- Clade: Asterids
- Order: Asterales
- Family: Goodeniaceae
- Genus: Goodenia
- Species: G. gibbosa

Binomial name
- Goodenia gibbosa Carolin

= Goodenia gibbosa =

Species of plant

Goodenia gibbosa is a species of flowering plant in the family Goodeniaceae and is endemic to central Australia. It is a prostrate to low-lying, often stoloniferous herb covered with soft hairs. It has elliptic to lance-shaped leaves and small groups of yellow flowers.

== Description ==
Goodenia gibbosa is a prostrate to low-lying herb covered with soft hairs and has stems up to 40 cm (16 in) long. It has elliptic to lance-shaped leaves with the narrower end towards the base, at the base of the plant and at the end of stolons. The leaves are 50–80 mm (2.0–3.1 in) long and 4–14 mm (0.16–0.55 in) wide and coarsely-toothed. The flowers are arranged in small groups with leaf-like bracts, each flower on a pedicel 40–80 mm (1.6–3.1 in) long. The sepals are lance-shaped to egg-shaped, 2–3 mm (0.079–0.118 in) long, the petals yellow, 12–17 mm (0.47–0.67 in) long. The lower lobes of the corolla are 5–6 mm (0.20–0.24 in) long with wings 2–2.5 mm (0.079–0.098 in) wide. Flowering mainly occurs from May to October and the fruit is a more or less spherical capsule 5–6 mm (0.20–0.24 in) in diameter.

== Taxonomy and naming ==
Goodenia gibbosa was first formally described in 1980 by Roger Charles Carolin in the journal Telopea from material he collected near the southern end of the Dean Range in the Northern Territory in 1967. The specific epithet (gibbosa) means "swollen" or "pouched", referring to the ovary.

== Distribution and habitat ==
This goodenia grows in sandy soil on dunes and is widely distributed in the drier areas of the Northern Territory, Western Australia and South Australia.

== Conservation status ==
Goodenia gibbosa is classified as "Priority Three" by the Government of Western Australia Department of Parks and Wildlife meaning that it is poorly known and known from only a few locations but is not under imminent threat but as of "least concern" under the Northern Territory Government Territory Parks and Wildlife Conservation Act 1976.
