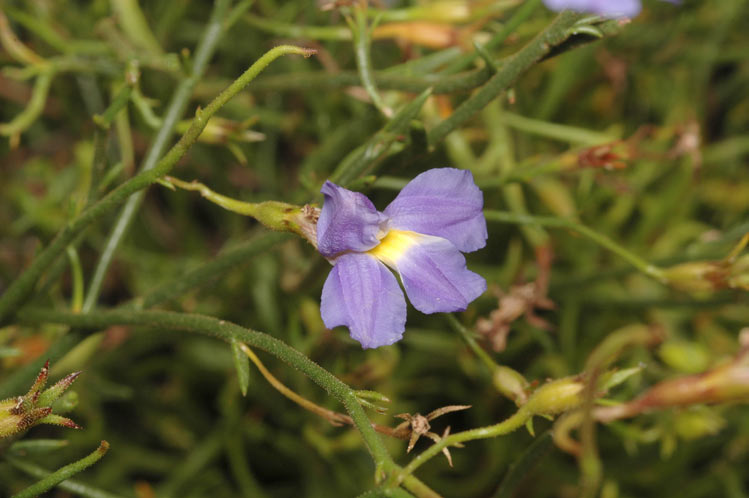
- In the Australian National Botanic Gardens

Scientific classification
- Kingdom: Plantae
- Clade: Tracheophytes
- Clade: Angiosperms
- Clade: Eudicots
- Clade: Asterids
- Order: Asterales
- Family: Goodeniaceae
- Genus: Goodenia
- Species: G. coerulea

Binomial name
- Goodenia coerulea R.Br.

Synonyms
- Goodenia barilletii F.Muell.; Goodenia rigida Benth.; Goodenia teretifolia de Vriese nom. illeg.; Scaevola tenera de Vriese; Scaevola tenera var. pauciflora de Vriese; Scaevola tenera de Vriese var. tenera

= Goodenia coerulea =

Species of plant

Goodenia coerulea is a species of flowering plant in the family Goodeniaceae and is endemic to the south-west of Western Australia. It is an erect, perennial shrub or biennial herb shrub with linear leaves at the base of the plant, sometimes with a few teeth on the edges, racemes of blue flowers and oval fruit.

== Description ==
Goodenia coerulea is an erect, ascending shrub or biennial herb that typically grows to a height of 40–50 cm (16–20 in) with foliage covered with glandular hairs. The leaves are linear, 30–70 mm (1.2–2.8 in) long, 1–3 mm (0.039–0.118 in) wide and sessile. The flowers are arranged in racemes mostly up to 300 mm (12 in) long on a peduncle 10–25 mm (0.39–0.98 in) long with small, leaf-like bracteoles 2–5 mm (0.079–0.197 in) long at the base, each flower on a hairy pedicel 5–20 mm (0.20–0.79 in) long. The sepals are linear to lance-shaped, 3–7 mm (0.12–0.28 in) long and the petals blue and 15–25 mm (0.59–0.98 in) long. The lower lobes of the corolla are 5–10 mm (0.20–0.39 in) long with wings about 2 mm (0.079 in) wide. Flowering occurs from September to January and the fruit is an oval capsule 7–8 mm (0.28–0.31 in) long.

== Taxonomy and naming ==
Goodenia coerulea was first formally described in 1810 by Robert Brown in Prodromus Florae Novae Hollandiae et Insulae Van Diemen. The specific epithet (coerulea) means "deep sky-blue". (The epithet has sometimes been given as caerulea, but Brown's original spelling was coerulea.)

== Distribution and habitat ==
This goodenia grows in a variety of habitats and is widely distributed from near Shark Bay the south coast in the south-west of Western Australia.

== Conservation status ==
Goodenia coerulea is classified as "not threatened" by the Western Australian Government Department of Parks and Wildlife.
