= Goodenia lancifolia =

Scruffy goodenia

Scientific classification
- Kingdom: Plantae
- Clade: Tracheophytes
- Clade: Angiosperms
- Clade: Eudicots
- Clade: Asterids
- Order: Asterales
- Family: Goodeniaceae
- Genus: Goodenia
- Species: G. lancifolia

Binomial name
- Goodenia lancifolia L.W.Sage & Cranfield

Species of plant

Goodenia lancifolia, commonly known as scruffy goodenia, is a species of flowering plant in the family Goodeniaceae and is endemic to the far south-west corner of Western Australia. It is a perennial herb with linear to narrow egg-shaped at the base and stem-clasping, lance-shaped to egg-shaped stem-leaves and blue flowers with a white centre.

== Description ==
Goodenia lancifolia is a hairy perennial herb that typically grows to a height of 20–40 cm (7.9–15.7 in). The leaves at the base of the plant are linear to narrow egg-shaped with the narrower end towards the base, 14–65 mm (0.55–2.56 in) long and 1–4 mm (0.039–0.157 in) wide. The stem-leaves are more or less stem-clasping, lance-shaped to egg-shaped, 14–65 mm (0.55–2.56 in) long and 1–4 mm (0.039–0.157 in) wide, sometimes with toothed or lobed edges. The flowers are arranged in a raceme up to 250 mm (9.8 in) long, on peduncles 3–32 mm (0.12–1.26 in) long, each flower on a hairy pedicel up to 8 mm (0.31 in) long. The sepals are narrow egg-shaped, 2.4–3.7 mm (0.094–0.146 in) long and about 0.8 mm (0.031 in) wide and the corolla is blue with a white centre, 6–12 mm (0.24–0.47 in) long. The lower lobes of the corolla are 3.5–5.9 mm (0.14–0.23 in) long with wings 1–2 mm (0.039–0.079 in) wide. Flowering mostly occurs in January and the fruit is an elliptic to oval capsule.

== Taxonomy and naming ==
Goodenia lancifolia was first formally described in 2000 by Leigh William Sage and Raymond Jeffrey Cranfield in the journal Nuytsia from specimens collected near Pemberton in 2000. The specific epithet (lancifolia) means "lance-leaved".

== Distribution and habitat ==
This goodenia grows in winter-wet swamps and on the edge of lakes in the far south-west of south-western Western Australia.

== Conservation status ==
Goodenia lancifolia is classified as "not threatened" by the Government of Western Australia Department of Parks and Wildlife.
