= Goodenia subauriculata =

Scientific classification
- Kingdom: Plantae
- Clade: Tracheophytes
- Clade: Angiosperms
- Clade: Eudicots
- Clade: Asterids
- Order: Asterales
- Family: Goodeniaceae
- Genus: Goodenia
- Species: G. subauriculata

Binomial name
- Goodenia subauriculata C.T.White

Species of flowering plant

Goodenia subauriculata is a species of flowering plant in the family Goodeniaceae and is endemic to northern Australia. It is a hairy, ascending to low-lying herb with toothed, linear leaves and spikes of small, brownish-yellow flowers.

== Description ==
Goodenia subauriculata is a hairy, ascending to low-lying herb with stems up to 10 cm (3.9 in). Its leaves are linear, about 80 mm (3.1 in) long and 5 mm (0.20 in) wide with toothed edges. The flowers are arranged in spikes up to 80 mm (3.1 in) long with leaf-like bracts. The sepals are lance-shaped, about 1.5 mm (0.059 in) long and the corolla is brownish-yellow, about 4.5 mm (0.18 in) long. The lower lobes of the corolla are about 1 mm (0.039 in) long with wings about 0.5 mm (0.020 in) wide. Flowering occurs around April.

== Taxonomy and naming ==
Goodenia subauriculata was first formally described in 1946 by Cyril Tenison White in the Proceedings of the Royal Society of Queensland.

== Distribution ==
This goodenia grows in Arnhem Land and nearby areas in the Northern Territory and on Cape York Peninsula in Queensland.

== Conservation status ==
Goodenia subauriculata is classified as "data deficient" in the Northern Territory and as of "least concern" in Queensland.
