= Goodenia cylindrocarpa =

Scientific classification
- Kingdom: Plantae
- Clade: Tracheophytes
- Clade: Angiosperms
- Clade: Eudicots
- Clade: Asterids
- Order: Asterales
- Family: Goodeniaceae
- Genus: Goodenia
- Species: G. cylindrocarpa

Binomial name
- Goodenia cylindrocarpa Albr.

Species of plant

Goodenia cylindrocarpa is a species of flowering plant in the family Goodeniaceae and is endemic to northern Australia. It is an erect annual, herb with spatula-shaped, or lance-shaped to egg-shaped leaves at the base of the plant, and panicles of small yellow flowers.

== Description ==
Goodenia cylindrocarpa is an erect annual herb that typically grows to a height of about 25 cm (9.8 in). The leaves are arranged at the base of the plant and are spatula-shaped or lance-shaped to egg-shaped with the narrower end towards the base, 20–85 mm (0.79–3.35 in) long and 3.5–20 mm (0.14–0.79 in) wide with toothed edges. The flowers are arranged in panicles with leaf-like bracts at the base, each flower on a pedicel up to about 10 mm (0.39 in) long. The sepals are linear to lance-shaped, 2.5–4 mm (0.098–0.157 in) long, the petals yellow, 5–6.5 mm (0.20–0.26 in) long, the lower lobes with wings about 0.5 mm (0.020 in) wide. Flowering occurs from March to June and the fruit is a cylindrical capsule 7–9 mm (0.28–0.35 in) long and 2–3 mm (0.079–0.118 in) wide.

== Taxonomy and naming ==
Goodenia cylindrocarpa was first formally described in 2002 by David Edward Albrecht in the journal Nuytsia from specimens collected by Peter Latz near Pictorella Swamp in the Northern Territory in 1982. The specific epithet (cylindrocarpa) refers to the cylindrical shape of the fruit.

== Distribution and habitat ==
This goodenia grows in heavy clamp soil in seasonal swamps in scattered locations in the Northern Territory, and may also occur in arid or semi-arid Queensland.
