= Goodenia turleyae =

Conservation status
- Priority One — Poorly Known Taxa (DEC)

Scientific classification
- Kingdom: Plantae
- Clade: Tracheophytes
- Clade: Angiosperms
- Clade: Eudicots
- Clade: Asterids
- Order: Asterales
- Family: Goodeniaceae
- Genus: Goodenia
- Species: G. turleyae

Binomial name
- Goodenia turleyae L.W.Sage & K.A.Sheph.

Species of plant

Goodenia turleyae is a species of flowering plant in the family Goodeniaceae and endemic to a restricted area of the south-west of Western Australia. It is an annual herb with spatula-shaped leaves in a rosette at the base of the plant, and yellow flowers.

== Description ==
Goodenia turleyae is a more or less glabrous annual herb that typically grows to a height of 3–4 cm (1.2–1.6 in). The leaves are arranged in a rosette at the base of the plant and are spatula-shaped, 4–32 mm (0.16–1.26 in) long and 0.9–3.5 mm (0.035–0.138 in) wide. The flowers are arranged singly or in pairs, 14–43 mm (0.55–1.69 in) long on a peduncle 5–20 mm (0.20–0.79 in) long, each flower on a pedicel 4.5–21 mm (0.18–0.83 in) long with leaf-like bracts at the base. The sepals are narrow egg-shaped, 2.4–3.9 mm (0.094–0.154 in) long and the corolla yellow and 8–12 mm (0.31–0.47 in) long. The lower lobes of the corolla are 2.9–5 mm (0.11–0.20 in) long with wings 1.7–2.6 mm (0.067–0.102 in) wide. Flowering occurs from September to November.

== Taxonomy and naming ==
Goodenia turleyae was first formally described in 2007 by Leigh William Sage and Kelly Anne Shepherd in the journal Nuytsia from material collected by Carol Turley in 2000. The specific epithet (turleyae) honours the collector of the type specimens.

== Distribution and habitat ==
This goodenia is only known from three populations north of Esperance in the Mallee biogeographic region, where it grows in moist, sheltered locations near salt lakes.

== Conservation status ==
Goddenia turleyae is classified as "Priority One" by the Government of Western Australia Department of Parks and Wildlife, meaning that it is known from only one or a few locations which are potentially at risk.
