= Goodenia schwerinensis =

Scientific classification
- Kingdom: Plantae
- Clade: Tracheophytes
- Clade: Angiosperms
- Clade: Eudicots
- Clade: Asterids
- Order: Asterales
- Family: Goodeniaceae
- Genus: Goodenia
- Species: G. schwerinensis

Binomial name
- Goodenia schwerinensis Carolin

Species of plant

Goodenia schwerinensis is a species of flowering plant in the family Goodeniaceae and is endemic to inland areas of Western Australia. It is a prostrate to low-lying herb with elliptic to lance-shaped leaves with toothed or lyrate edges, and racemes of yellow flowers.

== Description ==
Goodenia schwerinensis is a prostrate to low-lying annual herb with stems up to 40 cm (16 in) long, the foliage covered with soft hairs. The leaves at the base of the plant and are narrow elliptic to lance-shaped with the narrower end towards the base, 50–120 mm (2.0–4.7 in) long and 10–20 mm (0.39–0.79 in) wide with toothed or lyrate edges. The flowers are arranged in racemes up to 300 mm (12 in) long on peduncles 5–15 mm (0.20–0.59 in) long with leaf-like bracts and linear bracteoles 4–5 mm (0.16–0.20 in) long, each flower on a pedicel 5–20 mm (0.20–0.79 in) long. The sepals are linear, 6–7 mm (0.24–0.28 in) long, the petals yellow, 12–15 mm (0.47–0.59 in) long. The lower lobes of the corolla are 6–7 mm (0.24–0.28 in) long with wings about 1.5 mm (0.059 in) wide. Flowering occurs from May to September and the fruit is a cylindrical capsule about 10 mm (0.39 in) long.

== Taxonomy and naming ==
Goodenia schwerinensis was first formally described in 1980 by Roger Charles Carolin in the journal Telopea from material collected by David Eric Symon at the eastern end of the Schwerin Mural Crescent Range in 1962. The specific epithet (schwerinensis) refers to the type location.

== Distribution and habitat ==
This goodenia grows in scrub and spinifex grassland in central eastern Western Australia.

== Conservation status ==
Goodenia schwerinensis is classified as "not threatened" by the Government of Western Australia Department of Parks and Wildlife.
