= Goodenia gypsicola =

Scientific classification
- Kingdom: Plantae
- Clade: Tracheophytes
- Clade: Angiosperms
- Clade: Eudicots
- Clade: Asterids
- Order: Asterales
- Family: Goodeniaceae
- Genus: Goodenia
- Species: G. gypsicola

Binomial name
- Goodenia gypsicola Symon

Species of plant

Goodenia gypsicola is a species of flowering plant in the family Goodeniaceae and is endemic to areas of salt lakes in inland Australia. It is a perennial herb with spatula-shaped leaves and racemes of pale blue flowers.

== Description ==
Goodenia gypsicola is a perennial, tuft-forming herb that typically grows to a height of 60 cm (24 in) and sometimes has up to one hundred leaves. The leaves are spatula-shaped, up to 30 mm (1.2 in) long and 10 mm (0.39 in) wide, sometimes with two or three lobes. The flowers are arranged in racemes 200–350 mm (7.9–13.8 in) long, each flower on a pedicel 5.5–7 mm (0.22–0.28 in) long with bracts 10–30 mm (0.39–1.18 in) long at the base. The sepals are about 1.5 mm (0.059 in) long, the corolla pale blue, about 6 mm (0.24 in) long. Flowering occurs in October.

== Taxonomy and naming ==
Goodenia gypsicola was first formally described in 2000 by David Eric Symon in the Journal of the Adelaide Botanic Gardens. The specific epithet (gypsicola) means "gypsum-inhabiting".

== Distribution and habitat ==
This goodenia grows in consolidated gypsum in scattered salt lakes in Western Australia and in the Serpentine Lakes area of South Australia.

== Conservation status ==
Goodenia gypsicola is classified as "not threatened" by the Government of Western Australia Department of Parks and Wildlife.
