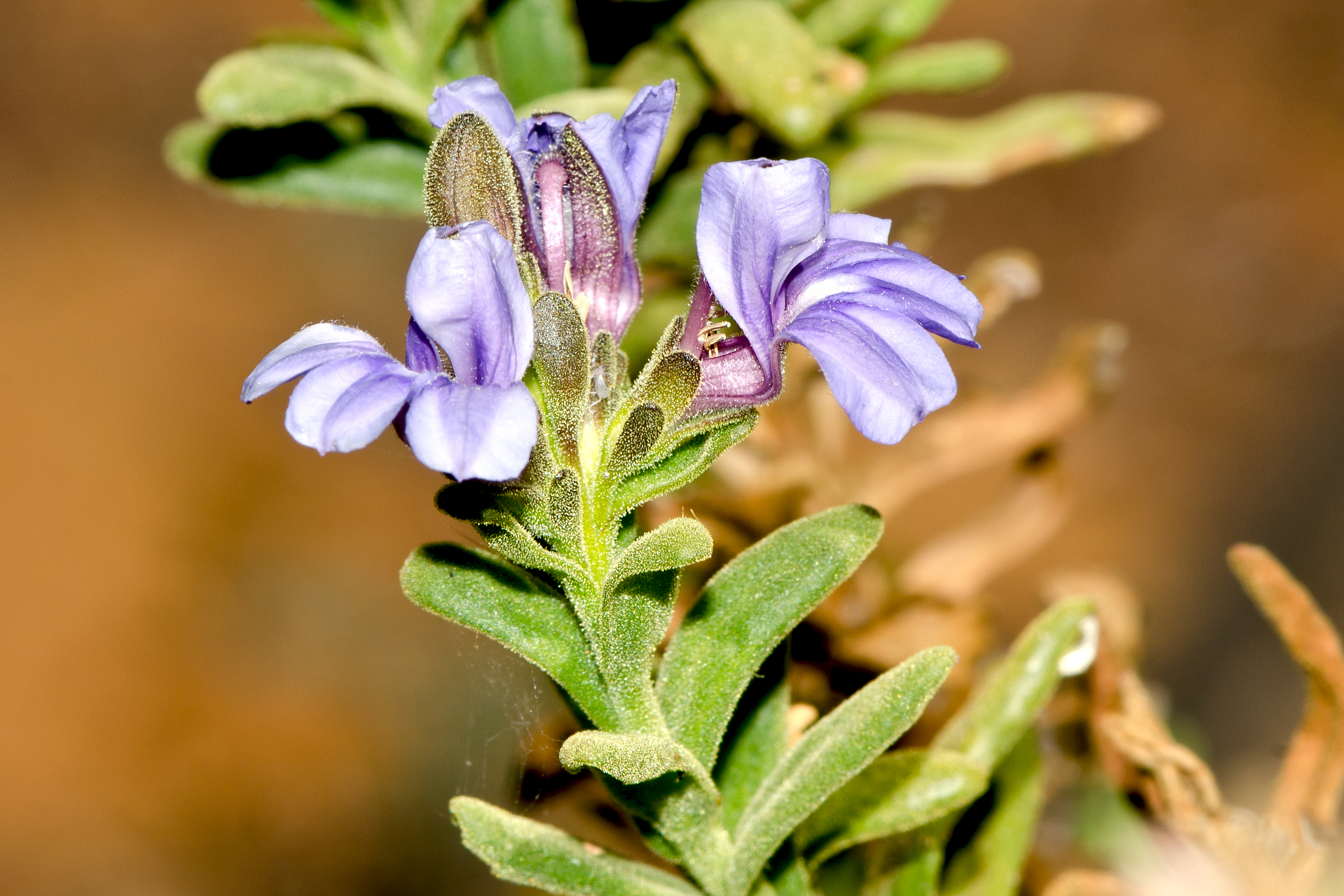

Conservation status
- Priority Two — Poorly Known Taxa (DEC)

Scientific classification
- Kingdom: Plantae
- Clade: Tracheophytes
- Clade: Angiosperms
- Clade: Eudicots
- Clade: Asterids
- Order: Asterales
- Family: Goodeniaceae
- Genus: Goodenia
- Species: G. xanthotricha

Binomial name
- Goodenia xanthotricha de Vriese

= Goodenia xanthotricha =

Species of plant

Goodenia xanthotricha, commonly known as yellow-haired goodenia, is a species of flowering plant in the family Goodeniaceae and is endemic to a restricted area in the southwest of Western Australia. It is a herb-like shrub with sticky foliage, linear to lance-shaped leaves with the narrower end towards the base, racemes of blue flowers, and cylindrical to oval fruit.

== Description ==
Goodenia xanthotricha is a herb-like shrub that typically grows to a height of up to 50 cm (20 in), its foliage covered with glandular hairs and sticky. The leaves are linear to lance-shaped with the narrower end towards the base, 15–35 mm (0.59–1.38 in) long and 2–7 mm (0.079–0.276 in) wide with toothed edges. The flowers are arranged in racemes up to 60 mm (2.4 in) long on a peduncle 2–4 mm (0.079–0.157 in) long with leaf-like bracts and narrow egg-shaped bracteoles 4–10 mm (0.16–0.39 in) long. Each flower is on a pedicel about 1 mm (0.039 in) long with narrow oblong sepals 4–5 mm (0.16–0.20 in) long and a blue corolla about 14 mm (0.55 in) long. The lower lobes of the corolla are about 5 mm (0.20 in) long with wings about 2 mm (0.079 in) wide. Flowering mainly occurs from November to February and the fruit is a cylindrical to oval capsule 5–6 mm (0.20–0.24 in) long.

== Taxonomy and naming ==
Goodenia xanthotricha was first formally described in 1854 by Willem Hendrik de Vriese in the journal Natuurkundige Verhandelingen van de Hollandsche Maatschappij der Wetenschappen te Haarlem. The specific epithet (xanthotricha) means "yellow hair".

== Distribution and habitat ==
Yellow-haired goodenia grows on gravelly hills near Hill River in the Geraldton Sandplains and Swan Coastal Plain biogeographic regions of south-western Western Australia.

== Conservation status ==
This goodenia is classified as "Priority Two" by the Western Australian Government Department of Parks and Wildlife, meaning that it is poorly known and from only one or a few locations.
