= Goodenia chthonocephala =

Scientific classification
- Kingdom: Plantae
- Clade: Tracheophytes
- Clade: Angiosperms
- Clade: Eudicots
- Clade: Asterids
- Order: Asterales
- Family: Goodeniaceae
- Genus: Goodenia
- Species: G. chthonocephala

Binomial name
- Goodenia chthonocephala Carolin

Species of plant

Goodenia chthonocephala is a species of flowering plant in the family Goodeniaceae and is endemic to a restricted area of the Northern Territory. It is a small, annual, cushion-like herb with linear to lance-shaped leaves and groups of flowers held at ground level.

== Description ==
Goodenia chthonocephala is a small, cushion-like annual herb with linear to lance-shaped leaves at the base, up to 80 mm (3.1 in) long and 3 mm (0.12 in) wide. The flowers are sessile arranged in leaf axils in heads at ground level. The sepals are linear, about 0.5 mm (0.020 in) long, the petals reddish when dry and 1.0–1.5 mm (0.039–0.059 in) long. The lower lobes of the corolla are about 1 mm (0.039 in) long and lack wings. Flowering has been observed in July and the fruit is an elliptic capsule about 3 mm (0.12 in) long.

== Taxonomy and naming ==
Goodenia chthonocephala was first formally described in 1990 by Roger Charles Carolin in the journal Telopea from material collected by Peter Latz on Cox River Station in 1977. The specific epithet (chthonocephala) means "earth-head", referring to the groups of flowers at ground level.

== Distribution and habitat ==
This goodenia grows is only known from the type collection in a damp situation on Cox River Station in the north of the Northern Territory.

== Conservation status ==
Goodenia chthonocephala is classified as "data deficient" under the Northern Territory Government Territory Parks and Wildlife Conservation Act 1976.
