= Goodenia symonii =

Scientific classification
- Kingdom: Plantae
- Clade: Tracheophytes
- Clade: Angiosperms
- Clade: Eudicots
- Clade: Asterids
- Order: Asterales
- Family: Goodeniaceae
- Genus: Goodenia
- Species: G. symonii

Binomial name
- Goodenia symonii (Carolin) Carolin

Synonyms
- Calogyne symonii Carolin

Species of plant

Goodenia symonii is a species of flowering plant in the family Goodeniaceae and is endemic to the northern part of the Northern Territory. It is a herb with prostrate to erect branches, lance-shaped leaves with the narrower end towards the base, and racemes of purplish or reddish flowers.

== Description ==
Goodenia symonii is a herb with prostrate to erect stems up to 20 cm (7.9 in) long and hairy foliage. The leaves are lance-shaped with the narrower end long-tapering towards the base, 10–70 mm (0.39–2.76 in) long and about 0.3–1.5 mm (0.012–0.059 in) wide. The flowers are arranged in racemes up to 150 mm (5.9 in) long with leaf-like bracts, each flower on a pedicel 8–15 mm (0.31–0.59 in) long. The sepals are lance-shaped to elliptic, about 3.5 mm (0.14 in) long, the petals purplish or reddish and 5–12 mm (0.20–0.47 in) long. The lower lobes of the corolla are 2–3 mm (0.079–0.118 in) long with wings about 1 mm (0.039 in) wide. Flowering occurs from February to June and the fruit is an oval capsule about 4 mm (0.16 in) long.

== Taxonomy and naming ==
This species was first formally described in 1979 by Roger Charles Carolin who gave it the name Calogyne symonii in the journal Brunonia from material collected by David Symon in 1972. In 1990, Carolin changed the name to Goodenia symonii in the journal Telopea.

== Distribution and habitat ==
This goodenia grows in seasonally wet soil in the north of the Northern Territory.

== Conservation status ==
Goodenia symonii is classified as "least concern" under the Northern Territory Government Territory Parks and Wildlife Conservation Act 1976.
