= Goodenia glauca =

Pale goodenia

Scientific classification
- Kingdom: Plantae
- Clade: Tracheophytes
- Clade: Angiosperms
- Clade: Eudicots
- Clade: Asterids
- Order: Asterales
- Family: Goodeniaceae
- Genus: Goodenia
- Species: G. glauca

Binomial name
- Goodenia glauca F.Muell.

Species of plant

Goodenia glauca, commonly known as pale goodenia, is a species of flowering plant in the family Goodeniaceae and is endemic to the drier inland areas of eastern continental Australia. It is a glaucous, erect, ascending perennial herb with lance-shaped to elliptic leaves and racemes of pale yellow flowers.

== Description ==
Goodenia glauca is a glaucous, ascending perennial herb that typically grows to a height of 20 cm (7.9 in) and is more or less glabrous. It has lance-shaped to elliptic leaves 30–80 mm (1.2–3.1 in) long, 5–10 mm (0.20–0.39 in) wide and sometimes toothed, at the base of the plant. The flowers are arranged in racemes up to 150 mm (5.9 in) long with leaf-like bracts, each flower on a pedicel 20–50 mm (0.79–1.97 in) long. The sepals are lance-shaped, 2.5–4 mm (0.098–0.157 in) long, the corolla pale yellow, 12–17 mm (0.47–0.67 in) long. The lower lobes of the corolla are 5.5–6.5 mm (0.22–0.26 in) long with wings 2.5–3 mm (0.098–0.118 in) wide. Flowering occurs in most months and the fruit is a more or less spherical capsule about 6 mm (0.24 in) in diameter.

== Taxonomy and naming ==
Goodenia glauca was first formally described in 1855 by Ferdinand von Mueller in the Transactions and Proceedings of the Victorian Institute for the Advancement of Science. The specific epithet (glauca) means "having a bluish-grey or bluish-green bloom".

== Distribution and habitat ==
This goodenia mainly grows on floodplains and river banks on heavy soils in the drier inland areas of Queensland, South Australia, Victoria and New South Wales.
