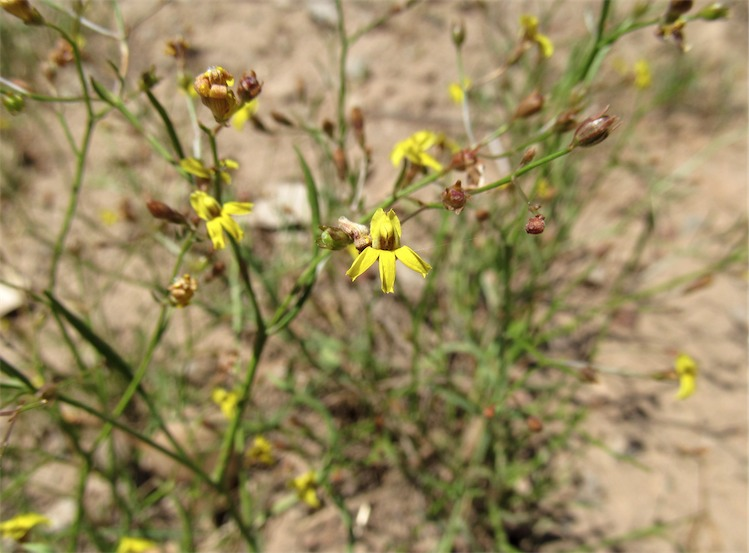
- Goodenia gracilis near Cecil Plains

Scientific classification
- Kingdom: Plantae
- Clade: Tracheophytes
- Clade: Angiosperms
- Clade: Eudicots
- Clade: Asterids
- Order: Asterales
- Family: Goodeniaceae
- Genus: Goodenia
- Species: G. gracilis

Binomial name
- Goodenia gracilis R.Br.

Synonyms
- Goodenia gracilis R.Br. var. gracilis; Goodenia semiteres Domin

= Goodenia gracilis =

Slender goodenia

Species of plant

Goodenia gracilis, commonly known as slender goodenia, is a species of flowering plant in the family Goodeniaceae and is endemic to Australia. It is an annual or perennial herb with linear to lance-shaped leaves and racemes of yellow flowers.

== Description ==
Goodenia gracilis is an annual or perennial herb that typically grows to a height of 50 cm (20 in). The leaves are mostly at the base of the plant, linear to lance-shaped, 5–17 mm (0.20–0.67 in) long and 1–5 mm (0.039–0.197 in) wide sometimes with toothed edges. The flowers are arranged in racemes 30–200 mm (1.2–7.9 in) long on a peduncle usually 10–25 mm (0.39–0.98 in) long with linear bracts up to 20 mm (0.79 in) long at the base. Each flower is on a pedicel 8–20 mm (0.31–0.79 in) long with linear bracteoles 1–2 mm (0.039–0.079 in) long. The sepals are narrow triangular, 1–1.4 mm (0.039–0.055 in) long and the petals are yellow, 7–10 mm (0.28–0.39 in) long. The lower lobes of the corolla are 2.5–4 mm (0.098–0.157 in) long with wings about 1 mm (0.039 in) wide. Flowering occurs in most months and the fruit is a more or less spherical to oval capsule 3–6 mm (0.12–0.24 in) long.

== Taxonomy and naming ==
Goodenia gracilis was first formally described in 1810 by Robert Brown in his Prodromus Florae Novae Hollandiae et Insulae Van Diemen. The specific epithet (gracilis) means "thin" or "slender".

== Distribution and habitat ==
This goodenia grows in heavy, moisture-retaining soil of inland parts of New South Wales, Victoria, Queensland and scattered locations in the Northern Territory.
