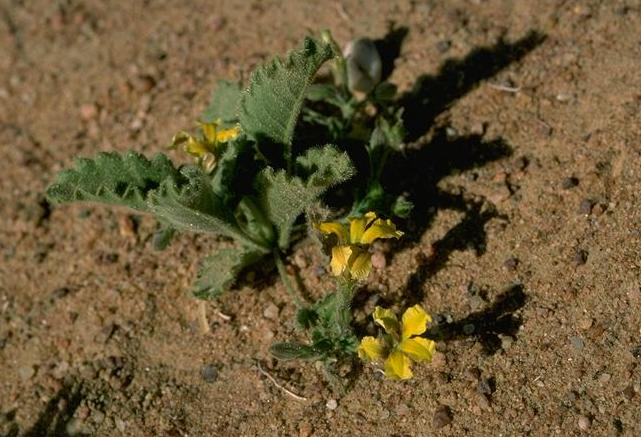
- Near Hughenden

Conservation status
- Priority Three — Poorly Known Taxa (DEC)

Scientific classification
- Kingdom: Plantae
- Clade: Tracheophytes
- Clade: Angiosperms
- Clade: Eudicots
- Clade: Asterids
- Order: Asterales
- Family: Goodeniaceae
- Genus: Goodenia
- Species: G. hirsuta

Binomial name
- Goodenia hirsuta F.Muell.

= Goodenia hirsuta =

Species of plant

Goodenia hirsuta is a species of flowering plant in the family Goodeniaceae and is endemic to northern Australia. It is a hairy, prostrate to low-lying perennial herb with narrow egg-shaped leaves at the base of the plant, racemes of hairy yellow flowers and oval to elliptic fruit.

== Description ==
Goodenia hirsuta is a hairy, prostrate to low-lying perennial herb with stems up to 30 cm (12 in) long. The leaves at the base of the plant are hairy, narrow egg-shaped with the narrower end towards the base, 40–100 mm (1.6–3.9 in) long and 15–35 mm (0.59–1.38 in) wide with coarse teeth on the edges. The flowers are arranged in racemes up to 30 mm (1.2 in) long with leaf-like bracts, the individual flowers on pedicels 20–40 mm (0.79–1.57 in) long. The sepals are narrow elliptic to lance-shaped, 3.5–4.5 mm (0.14–0.18 in) long, the corolla yellow and hairy, 14–15 mm (0.55–0.59 in) long. The lower lobes of the corolla are 4–5 mm (0.16–0.20 in) long with wings 0.5–1 mm (0.020–0.039 in) wide. Flowering occurs from July to October and the fruit is an oval to elliptic capsule about 8 mm (0.31 in) long and 4 mm (0.16 in) wide.

== Taxonomy and naming ==
Goodenia hirsuta was first formally described in 1862 by Ferdinand von Mueller in Fragmenta Phytographiae Australiae. The specific epithet (hirsuta) means "hairy, with long, shaggy hairs".

== Distribution and habitat ==
This goodenia grows in a variety of soils in arid regions of Western Australia, north-eastern Northern Territory, South Australia and Queensland.

== Conservation status ==
Goodenia hirsuta is classified as of "least concern" under the Northern Territory Government Territory Parks and Wildlife Conservation Act 1976 and the Queensland Government Nature Conservation Act 1992, but as "Priority Three" by the Government of Western Australia Department of Parks and Wildlife meaning that it is poorly known and known from only a few locations but is not under imminent threat.
