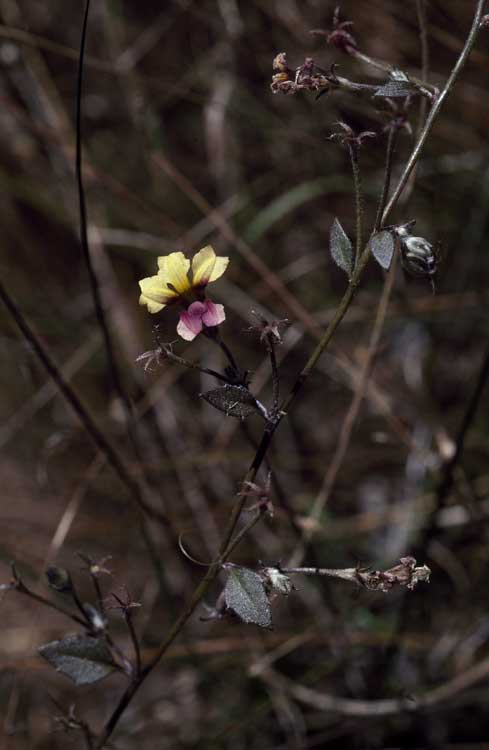

Scientific classification
- Kingdom: Plantae
- Clade: Tracheophytes
- Clade: Angiosperms
- Clade: Eudicots
- Clade: Asterids
- Order: Asterales
- Family: Goodeniaceae
- Genus: Goodenia
- Species: G. arachnoidea

Binomial name
- Goodenia arachnoidea Carolin

= Goodenia arachnoidea =

Species of plant

Goodenia arachnoidea is a species of flowering plant in the family Goodeniaceae and is endemic to Western Australia. It is an erect to ascending herb with egg-shaped leaves with the narrower end towards the base, and racemes of yellow flowers with leaf-like bracts at the base.

== Description ==
Goodenia arachnoidea is an erect to ascending herb that typically grows to a height of 450 mm (18 in), with dense, cobwebby hairs on the foliage. The leaves are egg-shaped with the narrower end towards the base, 40–100 mm (1.6–3.9 in) long, 15–35 mm (0.59–1.38 in) wide with small teeth on the edges. The stem leaves are more or less petiolate. The flowers are arranged in racemes up to 300 mm (12 in) long, each flower on a pedicel about 40 mm (1.6 in) long with leaf-like bracts at the base. The sepals are linear to triangular, densely hairy and 2–5 mm (0.079–0.197 in) long, the corolla yellow, 12–14 mm (0.47–0.55 in) long and hairy near the base. The lower lobes of the corolla are 4–5 mm (0.16–0.20 in) long with wings about 2 mm (0.079 in) wide. Flowering has been observed in May and the fruit is an oval capsule 4–5 mm (0.16–0.20 in) long.

== Taxonomy and naming ==
Goodenia arachnoidea was first formally described in 1990 by Roger Charles Carolin in the journal Telopea from material collected by David Symon near Theda Station in the Kimberleys in 1971. The specific epithet (arachnoidea) means "cobwebby", referring to the hairs on the foliage.

== Distribution and habitat ==
This goodenia usually grows in forest on sandstone outcrips in the Northern Kimberley region of Western Australia.

== Conservation status ==
Goodenia arachnoidea is classified as "not threatened" by the Western Australian Government Department of Parks and Wildlife.
