= Goodenia prostrata =

Scientific classification
- Kingdom: Plantae
- Clade: Tracheophytes
- Clade: Angiosperms
- Clade: Eudicots
- Clade: Asterids
- Order: Asterales
- Family: Goodeniaceae
- Genus: Goodenia
- Species: G. prostrata

Binomial name
- Goodenia prostrata Carolin

Species of plant

Goodenia prostrata is a species of flowering plant in the family Goodeniaceae and is endemic to inland parts of Western Australia. It is a prostrate herb with toothed, lance-shaped leaves at the base of the plant and racemes of yellow flowers with a brownish centre.

== Description ==
Goodenia prostrata is a prostrate herb with stems up to 30 cm (12 in) long with tufts of hair in the leaf axils. The leaves at the base of the plant are lance-shaped with the narrower end towards the base, 20–40 mm (0.79–1.57 in) long and 5–10 mm (0.20–0.39 in) wide. The flowers are arranged in racemes up to 300 mm (12 in) long, with leaf-like bracts, each flower on a pedicel 10–25 mm (0.39–0.98 in) long. The sepals are narrow elliptic, about 2.5 mm (0.098 in) long, the petals yellow with a brownish base and 12–15 mm (0.47–0.59 in) long. The lower lobes of the corolla are 4.5–5 mm (0.18–0.20 in) long with wings about 2.5 mm (0.098 in) wide. Flowering mainly occurs from May to September.

== Taxonomy and naming ==
Goodenia prostrata was first formally described in 1990 by Roger Charles Carolin in the journal Telopea from a specimen he collected 22 mi (35 km) from Roy Hill in 1970. The specific epithet (prostrata) refers to the prostrate habit of this goodenia.

== Distribution ==
This goodenia grows in sandy soil in the Pilbara and nearby regions of Western Australia.

== Conservation status ==
Goodenia prostrata is classified as "not threatened" by the Government of Western Australia Department of Parks and Wildlife.
