= Goodenia glandulosa =

Scientific classification
- Kingdom: Plantae
- Clade: Tracheophytes
- Clade: Angiosperms
- Clade: Eudicots
- Clade: Asterids
- Order: Asterales
- Family: Goodeniaceae
- Genus: Goodenia
- Species: G. glandulosa

Binomial name
- Goodenia glandulosa K.Krause

Species of plant

Goodenia glandulosa is a species of flowering plant in the family Goodeniaceae and is endemic to dry, inland areas of Australia. It is an erect, perennial herb with linear to lance-shaped leaves and racemes of yellow flowers.

== Description ==
Goodenia glandulosa is an erect, perennial herb that typically grows to a height of 50 cm (20 in) and is hairy or scaly. The leaves are linear or lance-shaped with the narrower end towards the base, 6–12 mm (0.24–0.47 in) long and 1–3 mm (0.039–0.118 in) wide and lobed when young. The flowers are arranged in racemes up to 230 mm (9.1 in) long with leaf-like bracts at the base, each flower on a pedicel 5–12 mm (0.20–0.47 in) long. The sepals are egg-shaped, 2–3 mm (0.079–0.118 in) long, the corolla yellow 8–11 mm (0.31–0.43 in) long. The lower lobes of the corolla are about 3.5 mm (0.14 in) long with wings about 1 mm (0.039 in) wide. Flowering mainly occurs from July to October and the fruit is a more or less spherical capsule 3–4 mm (0.12–0.16 in) in diameter.

== Taxonomy and naming ==
Goodenia glandulosa was first formally described in 1912 by Kurt Krause in Adolf Engler's journal Das Pflanzenreich from material collected in 1891. The specific epithet (glandulosa) means "gland-bearing", referring to the glandular hairs on the foliage.

== Distribution and habitat ==
This goodenia grows in dry, inland areas, usually on rocky hillsides in Western Australia and in South Australia, but on sand dunes in a few locations in the Northern Territory.

== Conservation status ==
Goodenia glandulosa is classified as "not threatened" by the Government of Western Australia Department of Parks and Wildlife but as "near threatened" under the Northern Territory Government Territory Parks and Wildlife Conservation Act 1976.
