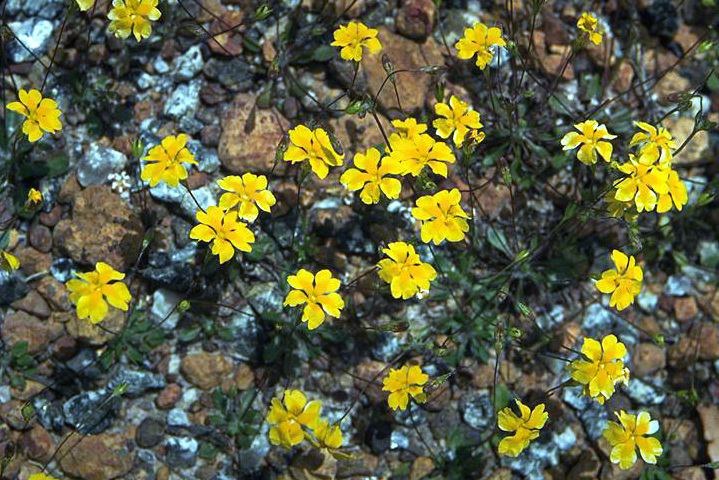
- In Pemberton

Scientific classification
- Kingdom: Plantae
- Clade: Tracheophytes
- Clade: Angiosperms
- Clade: Eudicots
- Clade: Asterids
- Order: Asterales
- Family: Goodeniaceae
- Genus: Goodenia
- Species: G. claytoniacea

Binomial name
- Goodenia claytoniacea F.Muell. ex Benth.

= Goodenia claytoniacea =

Species of plant

Goodenia claytoniacea is a species of flowering plant in the family Goodeniaceae and is endemic to the south-west of Western Australia. It is an annual herb with lance-shaped leaves mostly at the base of the plant, yellow flowers arranged singly or in small groups, and oval fruit.

== Description ==
Goodenia claytoniacea is an ascending perennial herb that typically grows to a height of 240 mm (9.4 in). The leaves are lance-shaped, or lance-shaped with the narrower end towards the base, mostly at the base of the plant, 20–60 mm (0.79–2.36 in) long and 2–4 mm (0.079–0.157 in) wide. The flowers are arranged singly or in small groups up to 100 mm (3.9 in) long on a peduncle 20–100 mm (0.79–3.94 in) long with linear to lance-shaped bracteoles 4–15 mm (0.16–0.59 in) long at the base, each flower on a pedicel 7–20 mm (0.28–0.79 in) long. The sepals are lance-shaped, about 1 mm (0.039 in) long and the corolla is yellow, 5–8 mm (0.20–0.31 in) long, the lower lobes of the corolla 2–2.5 mm (0.079–0.098 in) long with wings 1.2–1.4 mm (0.047–0.055 in) wide. Flowering occurs from October to February and the fruit is an oval capsule about 5 mm (0.20 in) long.

== Taxonomy and naming ==
Goodenia claytoniacea was first formally described in 1768 by George Bentham in Flora Australiensis from an unpublished description by Ferdinand von Mueller. Bentham apparently misread von Mueller's handwriting and gave the name G. laytoniana. The specific epithet (claytoniacea) refers to an apparent similarity to plants in the genus Claytonia.

== Distribution and habitat ==
This goodenia grows in sandy soil in swampy areas in the Jarrah Forest, Swan Coastal Plain and Warren in the south-west of Western Australia.

== Conservation status ==
Goodenia claytoniacea is classified as "not threatened" by the Western Australian Government Department of Parks and Wildlife.
