= Goodenia salina =

Conservation status
- Priority Two — Poorly Known Taxa (DEC)

Scientific classification
- Kingdom: Plantae
- Clade: Tracheophytes
- Clade: Angiosperms
- Clade: Eudicots
- Clade: Asterids
- Order: Asterales
- Family: Goodeniaceae
- Genus: Goodenia
- Species: G. salina

Binomial name
- Goodenia salina L.W.Sage & K.A.Sheph.

Species of plant

Goodenia salina is a species of flowering plant in the family Goodeniaceae and endemic to the south-west of Western Australia. It is an annual herb with lobed, oblong to lance-shaped leaves with the narrower end towards the base, arranged in a rosette at the base of the plant, and cymes of yellow flowers.

== Description ==
Goodenia salina is an annual herb that typically grows to a height of 220 cm (87 in) and is mostly glabrous. The leaves are arranged in a rosette at the base of the plant and are oblong to lance-shaped with the narrower end towards the base, 8–65 mm (0.31–2.56 in) long and 2–12 mm (0.079–0.472 in) wide, with lobes 3–8 mm (0.12–0.31 in) long and 0.2–1.5 mm (0.0079–0.0591 in) wide. The flowers are arranged in a cyme of up to five, 17–160 mm (0.67–6.30 in) long on a peduncle 13–140 mm (0.51–5.51 in) long, each flower on a pedicel 3–15 mm (0.12–0.59 in) long with leaf-like bracts at the base. The sepals are elliptic to broadly egg-shaped, about 1.5 mm (0.059 in) long and the corolla yellow 4.7–8.5 mm (0.19–0.33 in) long. The lower lobes of the corolla are 1.1–2 mm (0.043–0.079 in) long with wings 1–2 mm (0.039–0.079 in) wide. Flowering occurs from September to October with fruit forming in December.

== Taxonomy and naming ==
Goodenia salina was first formally described in 2007 by Leigh William Sage and Kelly Anne Shepherd in the journal Nuytsia from material collected near Lake King in 1993. The specific epithet (salina) means "saline", referring to the habitat of this species.

== Distribution and habitat ==
This goodenia is only known from two populations north-east of Albany in the Coolgardie and Mallee biogeographic regions, where it grows in well-drained saline soils on dunes near salt pans.

== Conservation status ==
Goddenia salina is classified as "Priority Two" by the Western Australian Government Department of Parks and Wildlife meaning that it is poorly known and from only one or a few locations.
