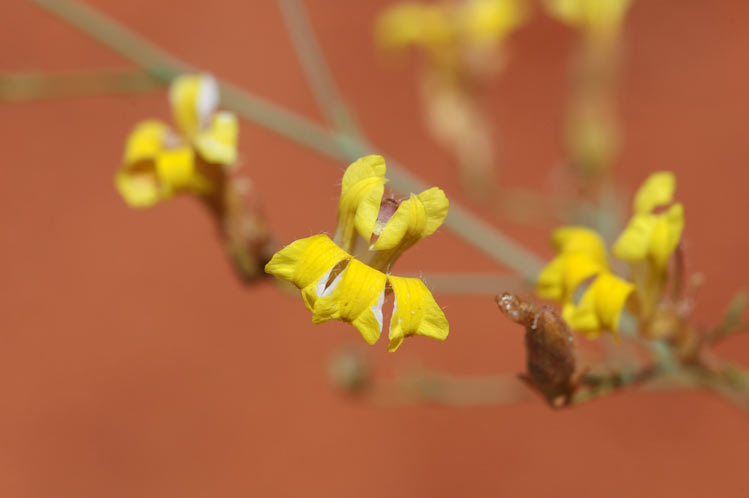
- In the Pilbara of Western Australia

Scientific classification
- Kingdom: Plantae
- Clade: Tracheophytes
- Clade: Angiosperms
- Clade: Eudicots
- Clade: Asterids
- Order: Asterales
- Family: Goodeniaceae
- Genus: Goodenia
- Species: G. lamprosperma

Binomial name
- Goodenia lamprosperma F.Muell.

= Goodenia lamprosperma =

Species of plant

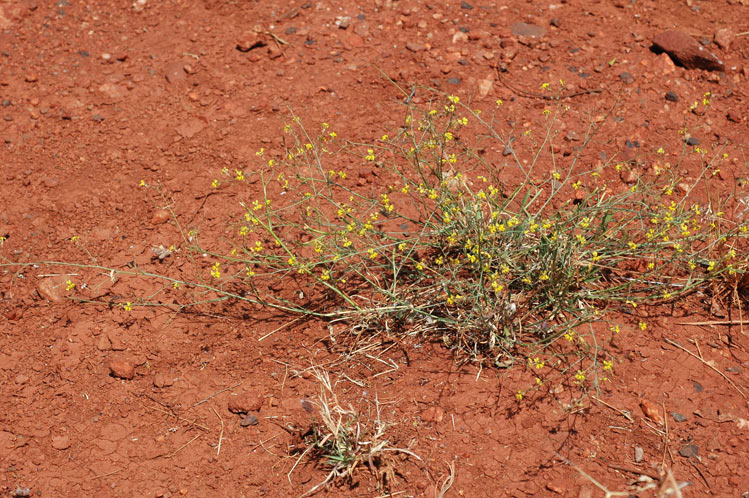
Habit

Goodenia lamprosperma is a species of flowering plant in the family Goodeniaceae and is endemic to northern Australia. It is an annual or perennial herb with linear to lance-shaped leaves sometimes with teeth on the edges, and racemes of yellow flowers.

== Description ==
Goodenia lamprosperma is an annual or perennial herb that typically grows to a height of 50 cm (20 in). The leaves are linear to lance-shaped with the narrower end towards the base, 30–80 mm (1.2–3.1 in) long and 3–10 mm (0.12–0.39 in) wide, sometimes with teeth on the edges. The flowers are arranged in racemes up to 350 mm (14 in) long on peduncles up to 80 mm (3.1 in) long with linear bracteoles 2–5 mm (0.079–0.197 in) long, the individual flowers on pedicels 3–6 mm (0.12–0.24 in) long. The sepals are lance-shaped to narrow oblong, 0.5–2 mm (0.020–0.079 in) long, the corolla yellow, 8–10 mm (0.31–0.39 in) long. The lower lobes of the corolla are 1.5–3 mm (0.059–0.118 in) long with wings 0.5–1.5 mm (0.020–0.059 in) wide. Flowering mainly occurs from April to August and the fruit is a cylindrical capsule 3–4 mm (0.12–0.16 in) long.

== Taxonomy and naming ==
Goodenia lamprosperma was first formally described in 1859 by Ferdinand von Mueller in Fragmenta Phytographiae Australiae. The specific epithet (lamprosperma) means "shining-seeded".

== Distribution and habitat ==
This goodenia grows in seasonally wet places, in swamps and near watercourses in north-western Western Australia, the Northern Territory and Queensland.

== Conservation status ==
Goodenia lamprosperma is classified as "not threatened" by the Government of Western Australia Department of Parks and Wildlife and as of "least concern" under the Queensland Government Nature Conservation Act 1992 and the Northern Territory Government Territory Parks and Wildlife Conservation Act 1976.
