= Goodenia tenuiloba =

Scientific classification
- Kingdom: Plantae
- Clade: Tracheophytes
- Clade: Angiosperms
- Clade: Eudicots
- Clade: Asterids
- Order: Asterales
- Family: Goodeniaceae
- Genus: Goodenia
- Species: G. tenuiloba

Binomial name
- Goodenia tenuiloba F.Muell.

Species of flowering plant

Goodenia tenuiloba is a species of flowering plant in the family Goodeniaceae and is endemic to the north-west of Western Australia. It is an erect to ascending herb with linear to oblong leaves at the base of the plant and racemes of yellow flowers.

== Description ==
Goodenia tenuiloba is an erect to ascending herb that typically grows to a height of 15–60 cm (5.9–23.6 in) with sparsely hairy foliage. The leaves at the base of the plant are linear to oblong, 15–60 mm (0.59–2.36 in) long and 1–2 mm (0.039–0.079 in) wide, sometimes with lobes up to 20 mm (0.79 in) long and 2 mm (0.079 in) wide. The flowers are arranged in racemes up to 250 mm (9.8 in) long with leaf-like bracts, each flower on a pedicel 20–40 mm (0.79–1.57 in) long. The corolla is yellow, the lower lobes 10–12 mm (0.39–0.47 in) long with wings 2–3 mm (0.079–0.118 in) wide, the upper lobes sometimes almost white. Flowering mainly occurs from May to September.

== Taxonomy and naming ==
Goodenia tenuiloba was first formally described in 1885 by Ferdinand von Mueller in the journal Southern Science Record from specimens collected "in the vicinity of Mt. Hale (C. Crossland)". The specific epithet (tenuiloba) means "thin-lobed".

== Distribution ==
This goodenia grows in scrub mainly in the Pilbara region.

== Conservation status ==
Goodenia tenuiloba is classified as "not threatened" by the Government of Western Australia Department of Parks and Wildlife.
