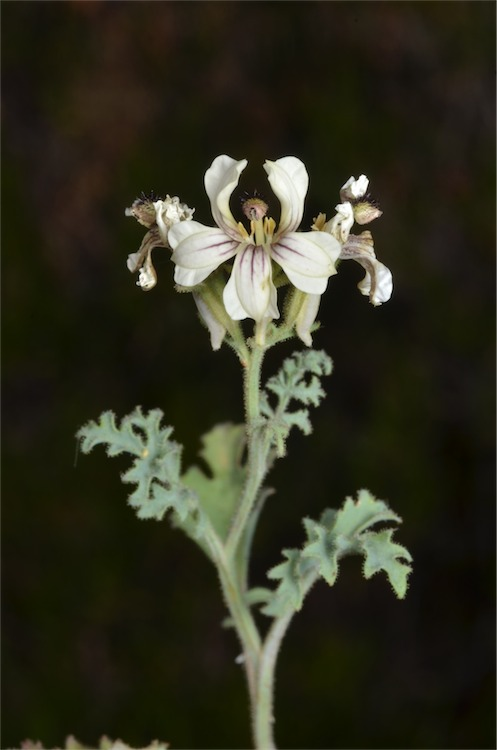
- Goodenia calcarata

Scientific classification
- Kingdom: Plantae
- Clade: Tracheophytes
- Clade: Angiosperms
- Clade: Eudicots
- Clade: Asterids
- Order: Asterales
- Family: Goodeniaceae
- Genus: Goodenia
- Species: G. calcarata

Binomial name
- Goodenia calcarata (F.Muell.) F.Muell.

Synonyms
- Pictophyta calcarata F.Muell.

= Goodenia calcarata =

Streaked goodenia

Species of plant

Goodenia calcarata, commonly known as streaked goodenia, is a species of flowering plant in the family Goodeniaceae and is endemic to Australia. It is an erect, annual herb with toothed egg-shaped to oblong leaves, racemes of white, cream-coloured or pink to mauve flowers with brownish markings, and oval fruit.

== Description ==
Goodenia calcarata is an erect, glaucous annual herb that typically grows to a height of 60 cm (24 in). The leaves are egg-shaped with the narrower end towards the base, to oblong or lyre-shaped, toothed 20–50 mm (0.79–1.97 in) long and 10–35 mm (0.39–1.38 in) wide on a petiole up to 20 mm (0.79 in) long. The flowers are arranged in racemes up to 150 mm (5.9 in) long on a peduncle 2–7 mm (0.079–0.276 in) long with linear bracts at the base, each flower on a pedicel 10–25 mm (0.39–0.98 in) long. The sepals are narrow elliptic, about 5 mm (0.20 in) long and the petals are white, cream-coloured or pink to mauve and 10–15 mm (0.39–0.59 in) long. The lower lobes of the corolla are 6–9 mm (0.24–0.35 in) long with wings 1.5–2 mm (0.059–0.079 in) wide. Flowering occurs from June to December and the fruit is an oval capsule 12–15 mm (0.47–0.59 in) long.

== Taxonomy and naming ==
Streaked goodenia was first formally described in 1853 by Ferdinand von Mueller who gave it the name Picrophyta calcarata in the journal Linnaea: ein Journal für die Botanik in ihrem ganzen Umfange, oder Beiträge zur Pflanzenkunde. In 1867, von Mueller changed the name to Goodenia calcarata in Fragmenta Phytographiae Australiae.

== Distribution and habitat ==
Goodenia calcarata grows in stony places in South Australia, the far south of the Northern Territory, west of Tibooburra in New South Wales and in south western Queensland.

== Conservation status ==
Goodenia calcarata is classified as "near threatened" under the Northern Territory Government Territory Parks and Wildlife Conservation Act 1976.
