= Goodenia leptoclada =

Thin-stemmed goodenia

Scientific classification
- Kingdom: Plantae
- Clade: Tracheophytes
- Clade: Angiosperms
- Clade: Eudicots
- Clade: Asterids
- Order: Asterales
- Family: Goodeniaceae
- Genus: Goodenia
- Species: G. leptoclada

Binomial name
- Goodenia leptoclada Benth.

Species of plant

Goodenia leptoclada, commonly known as thin-stemmed goodenia, is a species of flowering plant in the family Goodeniaceae and is endemic to the extreme south-west of Western Australia. It is an ascending perennial herb with lance-shaped to egg-shaped leaves with the narrower end towards the base and racemes of blue flowers.

== Description ==
Goodenia leptoclada is a ascending herb that typically grows to a height of up to 30 cm (12 in). The leaves are lance-shaped to egg-shaped with the narrower end towards the base, 5–25 mm (0.20–0.98 in) long and 1–3 mm (0.039–0.118 in) wide, sometimes with blunt teeth on the edges. The flowers are arranged in racemes up to 150 mm (5.9 in) long on a peduncle 10–25 mm (0.39–0.98 in) long with leaf-like bracts and linear bracteoles 2.5–3.5 mm (0.098–0.138 in) long. The sepals are lance-shaped, about 3 mm (0.12 in) long and the corolla is blue and 10–13 mm (0.39–0.51 in) long. The lower lobes of the corolla are 6–7 mm (0.24–0.28 in) long with wings 2–2.5 mm (0.079–0.098 in) wide. Flowering occurs from November to January and the fruit is more or less spherical capsule about 2 mm (0.079 in) in diameter.

== Taxonomy and naming ==
Goodenia laevis was first formally described in 1868 by George Bentham in Flora Australiensis from specimens collected by James Drummond. The specific epithet (leptoclada) means "thin-stemmed".

== Distribution and habitat ==
Thin-stemmed goodenia grows in sandy soil in the Esperance Plains, Jarrah Forest, Swan Coastal Plain and Warren biogeographic regions in the extreme south-west of Western Australia.

== Conservation status ==
Goddenia leptoclada is classified as "not threatened" by the Department of Environment and Conservation (Western Australia).
