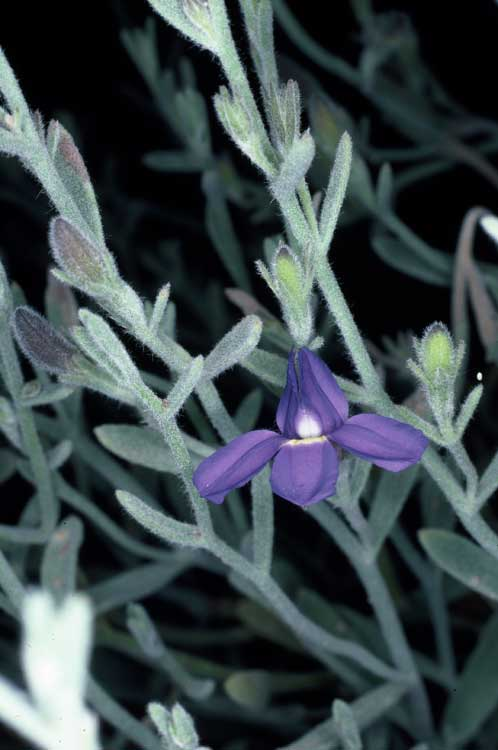
- In the Australian National Botanic Gardens

Scientific classification
- Kingdom: Plantae
- Clade: Tracheophytes
- Clade: Angiosperms
- Clade: Eudicots
- Clade: Asterids
- Order: Asterales
- Family: Goodeniaceae
- Genus: Goodenia
- Species: G. incana

Binomial name
- Goodenia incana R.Br.

Synonyms
- Scaevola pterosperma de Vriese

= Goodenia incana =

Species of plant

Goodenia incana is a species of flowering plant in the family Goodeniaceae and is endemic to the south-west of Western Australia. It is an ascending herb covered with silvery-white hairs, with linear to lance-shaped leaves mostly at the base of the plant, and racemes of blue flowers.

== Description ==
Goodenia incana is an ascending herb that typically grows to a height of 30 cm (12 in) and is covered with silvery-white hairs. The leaves are linear to lance-shaped with the narrower end towards the base, mostly arranged at the base of the plant, 20–40 mm (0.79–1.57 in) long and 3–8 mm (0.12–0.31 in) wide. The flowers are arranged in racemes up to 200 mm (7.9 in) long, with linear bracteoles 6–12 mm (0.24–0.47 in) long. Each flower is on a pedicel 2–5 mm (0.079–0.197 in) long with lance-shaped sepals 4–7 mm (0.16–0.28 in) long. The petals are blue, 12–15 mm (0.47–0.59 in) long, the lower lobes of the corolla 6–7 mm (0.24–0.28 in) long with wings about 2 mm (0.079 in) wide. Flowering mainly occurs from September to January and the fruit is an oval capsule 8–9 mm (0.31–0.35 in) long.

== Taxonomy and naming ==
Goodenia incana was first formally described in 1810 by Robert Brown in his Prodromus Florae Novae Hollandiae et Insulae Van Diemen. The specific epithet (incana) means "grey or hoary".

== Distribution and habitat ==
This goodenia grows in sandy soil in heath and forest and is widespread in the south-west of Western Australia.
