= Goodenia jaurdiensis =

Conservation status
- Priority Two — Poorly Known Taxa (DEC)

Scientific classification
- Kingdom: Plantae
- Clade: Tracheophytes
- Clade: Angiosperms
- Clade: Eudicots
- Clade: Asterids
- Order: Asterales
- Family: Goodeniaceae
- Genus: Goodenia
- Species: G. jaurdiensis

Binomial name
- Goodenia jaurdiensis L.W.Sage & K.A.Sheph.

Species of plant

Goodenia jaurdiensis is a species of flowering plant in the family Goodeniaceae and endemic to the south-west of Western Australia. It is an annual herb with egg-shaped to lance-shaped leaves with the narrower end towards the base, the leaves at the base of the plant, and racemes of yellow to orange flowers.

== Description ==
Goodenia jaurdiensis is an annual herb that typically grows to a height of 5–35 cm (2.0–13.8 in) but lacks a stem. The leaves are arranged in a rosette at the base of the plant and are egg-shaped to lance-shaped with the narrower end towards the base, and sometimes lobed. The leaves are 9–40 mm (0.35–1.57 in) long and 2–10 mm (0.079–0.394 in) wide, the lobes 0.3–3.2 mm (0.012–0.126 in) long and 0.4–0.8 mm (0.016–0.031 in) wide. The flowers are arranged in a raceme of two to four, 25–78 mm (0.98–3.07 in) long on a peduncle 25–42 mm (0.98–1.65 in) long, each flower on a pedicel 12–45 mm (0.47–1.77 in) long with leaf-like bracts at the base. The sepals are linear, 3–4 mm (0.12–0.16 in) long and the corolla yellow or orange and 10–14 mm (0.39–0.55 in) long. The lower lobes of the corolla are 3–4 mm (0.12–0.16 in) long with wings 1.2–2 mm (0.047–0.079 in) wide. Flowering occurs from September to October, depending on rainfall.

== Taxonomy and naming ==
Goodenia jaurdiensis was first formally described in 2007 by Leigh William Sage and Kelly Anne Shepherd in the journal Nuytsia from material collected by Sage on Jaurdi Station (north of Yellowdine) in 1999. The specific epithet (jaurdiensis) refers to the plant's growing near granite outcrops.

== Distribution and habitat ==
This goodenia is only known from three populations on Jaurdi Station in the Coolgardie biogeographic region, where it grows on low-lying plains and lower slopes in low forest or low open woodland.

== Conservation status ==
Goddenia jaurdiensis is classified as "Priority Two" by the Western Australian Government Department of Parks and Wildlife meaning that it is poorly known and from only one or a few locations.
