= Goodenia durackiana =

Conservation status
- Priority One — Poorly Known Taxa (DEC)

Scientific classification
- Kingdom: Plantae
- Clade: Tracheophytes
- Clade: Angiosperms
- Clade: Eudicots
- Clade: Asterids
- Order: Asterales
- Family: Goodeniaceae
- Genus: Goodenia
- Species: G. durackiana

Binomial name
- Goodenia durackiana Carolin

Species of plant

Goodenia durackiana is a species of flowering plant in the family Goodeniaceae and is endemic to north-western Australia. It is an erect to low-lying herb with elliptic to oblong stem leaves with coarse teeth on the edges, and racemes of yellow flowers.

== Description ==
Goodenia durackiana is an erect to low-lying herb that typically grows to a height of 50 cm (20 in). The leaves are mostly arranged on the stem, elliptic to oblong, 30–60 mm (1.2–2.4 in) long and 10–25 mm (0.39–0.98 in) wide, and coarsely toothed on the edges. The flowers are arranged in racemes up to 400 mm (16 in) long with leaf-like bracts long at the base, each flower on a pedicel 2–5 mm (0.079–0.197 in) long. The sepals are narrow elliptic, about 7 mm (0.28 in) long, the corolla yellow, about 15 mm (0.59 in) long. The lower lobes of the corolla are about 5 mm (0.20 in) long with wings 1–1.5 mm (0.039–0.059 in) wide. Flowering mostly occurs from March to May and the fruit is a more or less spherical capsule 8–10 mm (0.31–0.39 in) in diameter.

== Taxonomy and naming ==
Goodenia durackiana was first formally described in 1990 by Roger Charles Carolin in the journal Telopea from material collected by Michael Lazarides at the Kimberley Research Station in 1963. The specific epithet (durackiana) honours Kim Durack who collected specimens of this species in 1945.

== Distribution and habitat ==
This goodenia grows in grasslands on black, cracking soils in the north-eastern Kimberley region of Western Australia and north-western Northern Territory.

== Conservation status ==
Goodenia durackiana is classified as "Priority One" by the Government of Western Australia Department of Parks and Wildlife, meaning that it is known from only one or a few locations which are potentially at risk.
