= Goodenia malvina =

Conservation status
- Priority One — Poorly Known Taxa (DEC)

Scientific classification
- Kingdom: Plantae
- Clade: Tracheophytes
- Clade: Angiosperms
- Clade: Eudicots
- Clade: Asterids
- Order: Asterales
- Family: Goodeniaceae
- Genus: Goodenia
- Species: G. malvina

Binomial name
- Goodenia malvina Carolin

Species of plant

Goodenia malvina is a species of flowering plant in the family Goodeniaceae and is endemic to north-western Australia. It is a prostrate to low-lying herb with egg-shaped to lance-shaped leaves on the stems and racemes of mauve to pinkish and yellowish flowers.

== Description ==
Goodenia malvina is a prostrate to low-lying herb with glabrous, four-sided stems up to 50 cm (20 in) long. The leaves are mostly arranged along the stems and are lance-shaped to egg-shaped with the narrower end towards the base and toothed or lobed, 25–70 mm (0.98–2.76 in) long and 5–13 mm (0.20–0.51 in) wide. The flowers are arranged in racemes up to 400 mm (16 in) long, with leaf-like bracts, each flower on a pedicel 20–50 mm (0.79–1.97 in) long. The sepals are lance-shaped to narrow oblong, 2–4 mm (0.079–0.157 in) long, the petals mauve to pinkish and yellowish 9–14 mm (0.35–0.55 in) long. The lower lobes of the corolla are 3–4 mm (0.12–0.16 in) long with wings about 1.5 mm (0.059 in) wide. Flowering occurs from March to May and the fruit is a compressed oval capsule 5–6 mm (0.20–0.24 in) long.

== Taxonomy and naming ==
Goodenia malvina was first formally described in 1990 Roger Charles Carolin in the journal Telopea. The specific epithet (malvina) means "mauve", referring to the colour of the flowers.

== Distribution and habitat ==
This goodenia grows in cracking clay soil in the north-eastern Kimberley region of Western Australia and Arnhem Land in the Northern Territory.

== Conservation status ==
Goodenia malvina is classified as "Priority One" by the Government of Western Australia Department of Parks and Wildlife, meaning that it is known from only one or a few locations which are potentially at risk and as "data deficient" under the Northern Territory Government Territory Parks and Wildlife Conservation Act 1976.
