= List of Wahlenbergia species =

The following is a list of Wahlenbergia species recognised by the Plants of the World Online as at August 2024:

- Wahlenbergia abyssinica (Hochst. ex A.Rich.)
  - Wahlenbergia abyssinica subsp. abyssinica
  - Wahlenbergia abyssinica subsp. parvipetala Thulin
- Wahlenbergia acaulis E.Mey. ex A.DC. in A.P.de Candolle
- Wahlenbergia acicularis Brehmer
- Wahlenbergia acuminata Brehmer
- Wahlenbergia adamsonii Lammers
- Wahlenbergia adpressa (L.f.) Sond.
- Wahlenbergia akaroa J.A.Petterson
- Wahlenbergia albens (Spreng. ex A.DC.) Lammers
- Wahlenbergia albicaulis (Sond.) Lammers
- Wahlenbergia albomarginata Hook.
  - Wahlenbergia albomarginata subsp. albomarginata
  - Wahlenbergia albomarginata subsp. decora J.A.Petterson
  - Wahlenbergia albomarginata subsp. flexilis (Petrie) J.A.Petterson
  - Wahlenbergia albomarginata subsp. laxa (G.Simpson) J.A.Petterson
  - Wahlenbergia albomarginata subsp. olivina J.A.Petterson
- Wahlenbergia androsacea A.DC.
  - Wahlenbergia androsacea var. multicaulis Brehmer
- Wahlenbergia angustifolia (Roxb.) A.DC.
- Wahlenbergia annua (A.DC.) Thulin
- Wahlenbergia annularis A.DC. in A.P.de Candolle
- Wahlenbergia annuliformis Brehmer
- Wahlenbergia appressifolia Hilliard & B.L.Burtt
- Wahlenbergia arcta Thulin
- Wahlenbergia aridicola P.J.Sm.
- Wahlenbergia asparagoides (Adamson) Lammers
- Wahlenbergia asperifolia Brehmer
- Wahlenbergia axillaris (Sond.) Lammers
- Wahlenbergia banksiana A.DC.
- Wahlenbergia berteroi Hook. & Arn.
- Wahlenbergia bolusiana Schltr. & Brehmer
- Wahlenbergia bowkeriae Sond.
- Wahlenbergia brachiata (Adamson) Lammers
- Wahlenbergia brachycarpa Schltr.
- Wahlenbergia brachyphylla (Adamson) Lammers
- Wahlenbergia brasiliensis Cham.
- Wahlenbergia brehmeri Lammers
- Wahlenbergia brevisquamifolia Brehmer
- Wahlenbergia buseriana Schltr. & Brehmer
- Wahlenbergia calcarea (Adamson) Lammers
- Wahlenbergia calycina Schltdl. ex Griseb.
- Wahlenbergia campanuloides (Delile) Vatke
- Wahlenbergia candolleana (Hiern) Thulin
- Wahlenbergia candollei Tuyn
- Wahlenbergia capensis (L.) A.DC.
- Wahlenbergia capillacea (L.f.) A.DC.
  - Wahlenbergia capillacea subsp. capillacea
  - Wahlenbergia capillacea subsp. tenuior (Engl.) Thulin
- Wahlenbergia capillaris (G.Lodd.) G.Don in R.Sweet – tufted bluebell
- Wahlenbergia capillata Brehmer
- Wahlenbergia capillifolia E.Mey. ex Brehmer
- Wahlenbergia capitata (Baker) Thulin
- Wahlenbergia cartilaginea Hook.f.
- Wahlenbergia caryophylloides P.J.Sm.
- Wahlenbergia celata P.I.Forst.
- Wahlenbergia cephalodina Thulin
- Wahlenbergia ceracea Lothian – waxy bluebell
- Wahlenbergia cerastioides Thulin
- Wahlenbergia cernua (Thunb.) A.DC.
- Wahlenbergia cinerea (L.f.) Lammers
- Wahlenbergia clavata Brehmer
- Wahlenbergia collomioides (A.DC.) Thulin
- Wahlenbergia compacta Brehmer
- Wahlenbergia confusa Merr. & L.M.Perry
- Wahlenbergia congesta (Cheeseman) N.E.Br.
  - Wahlenbergia congesta subsp. congesta
  - Wahlenbergia congesta subsp. haastii J.A.Petterson
- Wahlenbergia congestifolia Brehmer
- Wahlenbergia constricta Brehmer
- Wahlenbergia cooperi Brehmer
- Wahlenbergia cordata (Adamson) Lammers
- Wahlenbergia cordiformis Cupido & Engelbrecht
- Wahlenbergia costata A.DC. in A.P.de Candolle
- Wahlenbergia cuspidata Brehmer
- Wahlenbergia debilis H.Buek in C.F.Ecklon & K.L.P.Zeyher
- Wahlenbergia decipiens A.DC. in A.P.de Candolle
- Wahlenbergia densicaulis Brehmer
  - Wahlenbergia densicaulis var. angusta Brehmer
- Wahlenbergia densifolia Lothian – fairy bluebell
- Wahlenbergia dentata Brehmer
- Wahlenbergia denticulata (Burch.) A.DC.
- Wahlenbergia denudata A.DC.
- Wahlenbergia depressa J.M.Wood & M.S.Evans
- Wahlenbergia desmantha Lammers
- Wahlenbergia dichotoma A.DC. in A.P.de Candolle
- Wahlenbergia dieterlenii (E.Phillips) Lammers
- Wahlenbergia dilatata Brehmer
- Wahlenbergia distincta Brehmer
- Wahlenbergia divergens A.DC. in A.P.de Candolle
- Wahlenbergia doleritica Hilliard & B.L.Burtt
- Wahlenbergia dunantii A.DC.
- Wahlenbergia ecklonii H.Buek in C.F.Ecklon & K.L.P.Zeyher
- Wahlenbergia effusa (Adamson) Lammers
- Wahlenbergia epacridea Sond.
- Wahlenbergia erecta (Roth ex Schult.) Tuyn
- Wahlenbergia ericoidella (P.A.Duvign. & Denaeyer) Thulin
- Wahlenbergia erophiloides Markgr.
- Wahlenbergia exilis A.DC.
- Wahlenbergia fasciculata Brehmer
- Wahlenbergia fernandeziana A.DC.
- Wahlenbergia filipes Brehmer
- Wahlenbergia fistulosa Brehmer
- Wahlenbergia flexuosa (Hook.f. & Thomson) Thulin
- Wahlenbergia floribunda Schltr. & Brehmer
- Wahlenbergia fluminalis (J.M.Black) E.Wimm. ex H.Eichler – river bluebell
- Wahlenbergia fruticosa Brehmer
- Wahlenbergia galpiniae Schltr.
- Wahlenbergia glabra P.J.Sm.
- Wahlenbergia glandulifera Brehmer
- Wahlenbergia globularis E.Wimm.
- Wahlenbergia gloriosa Lothian – royal bluebell
- Wahlenbergia gracilenta Lothian – annual bluebell
- Wahlenbergia gracilis (G.Forst.) A.DC. – sprawling bluebell, Australian bluebell
- Wahlenbergia grahamiae Hemsl.
- Wahlenbergia grandiflora Brehmer
- Wahlenbergia graniticola Carolin
- Wahlenbergia hederacea (L.) Rchb.
- Wahlenbergia hirsuta (Edgew.) Tuyn
- Wahlenbergia hookeri (C.B.Clarke) Tuyn
- Wahlenbergia humbertii Thulin
- Wahlenbergia huttonii (Sond.) Thulin
- Wahlenbergia ingrata A.DC. in A.P.de Candolle
- Wahlenbergia insulae-howei Lothian
- Wahlenbergia intermedia Zahlbr.
- Wahlenbergia islensis P.J.Sm.
- Wahlenbergia itatiaiensis Rollim & Trovó
- Wahlenbergia juncea (H.Buek) Lammers
- Wahlenbergia kowiensis R.A.Dyer
- Wahlenbergia krebsii Cham.
  - Wahlenbergia krebsii subsp. arguta (Hook.f.) Thulin
  - Wahlenbergia krebsii subsp. krebsii
- Wahlenbergia lasiocarpa Schltr. & Brehmer
- Wahlenbergia laxiflora (Sond.) Lammers
- Wahlenbergia levynsiae Lammers
- Wahlenbergia linarioides (Lam.) A.DC.
- Wahlenbergia linifolia (Roxb.) A.DC.
- Wahlenbergia littoralis (Labill.) Sweet
- Wahlenbergia littoricola P.J.Sm.
- Wahlenbergia lobelioides (L.f.) Link
  - Wahlenbergia lobelioides subsp. lobelioides
  - Wahlenbergia lobelioides subsp. nutabunda (Guss.) Murb.
  - Wahlenbergia lobelioides subsp. riparia (A.DC.) Thulin
- Wahlenbergia lobulata Brehmer
- Wahlenbergia loddigesii (A.DC.) I.M.Turner
- Wahlenbergia longifolia (A.DC.) Lammers
- Wahlenbergia longisquamifolia Brehmer
- Wahlenbergia luteola P.J.Sm.
- Wahlenbergia lycopodioides Schltr. & Brehmer
- Wahlenbergia macrostachys (A.DC.) Lammers
- Wahlenbergia madagascariensis A.DC.
- Wahlenbergia magaliesbergensis Lammers
- Wahlenbergia malaissei Thulin
- Wahlenbergia marginata (Thunb.) A.DC.
- Wahlenbergia marunguensis Thulin
- Wahlenbergia masafuerae (Phil.) Skottsb.
- Wahlenbergia massonii A.DC.
- Wahlenbergia matthewsii Cockayne
- Wahlenbergia melanops Goldblatt & J.C.Manning
- Wahlenbergia meyeri A.DC. in A.P.de Candolle
- Wahlenbergia microphylla (Adamson) Lammers
- Wahlenbergia minuta Brehmer
- Wahlenbergia mollis Brehmer
- Wahlenbergia multicaulis Benth. in S.L.Endlicher & al.
- Wahlenbergia namaquana Sond.
- Wahlenbergia nana Brehmer
- Wahlenbergia napiformis (A.DC.) Thulin
- Wahlenbergia neorigida Lammers
- Wahlenbergia neostricta Lammers
- Wahlenbergia nodosa (H.Buek) Lammers
- Wahlenbergia obovata Brehmer
- Wahlenbergia oligantha Lammers
- Wahlenbergia oligotricha Schltr. & Brehmer
- Wahlenbergia oocarpa Sond.
- Wahlenbergia orae Lammers
- Wahlenbergia oxyphylla A.DC. in A.P.de Candolle
- Wahlenbergia pallidiflora Hilliard & B.L.Burtt
- Wahlenbergia paludicola Thulin
- Wahlenbergia paniculata (L.f.) A.DC.
- Wahlenbergia papuana P.Royen
- Wahlenbergia parvifolia (P.J.Bergius) Lammers
- Wahlenbergia patula A.DC. in A.P.de Candolle
- Wahlenbergia paucidentata Schinz
  - Wahlenbergia paucidentata var. tysonii Schinz
- Wahlenbergia pauciflora A.DC. in A.P.de Candolle
- Wahlenbergia peduncularis Wall. ex A.DC.) Hook.f. & Thomson
- Wahlenbergia perrieri Thulin
- Wahlenbergia perrottetii (A.DC.) Thulin
- Wahlenbergia persimilis Thulin
- Wahlenbergia peruviana A.Gray
- Wahlenbergia petraea Thulin
- Wahlenbergia pilosa H.Buek in C.F.Ecklon & K.L.P.Zeyher
- Wahlenbergia pinifolia N.E.Br.
- Wahlenbergia pinnata Compton
- Wahlenbergia planiflora P.J.Sm.
  - Wahlenbergia planiflora subsp. longipila Carolin ex P.J.Sm.
  - Wahlenbergia planiflora subsp. planiflora
- Wahlenbergia planifolia Gand.
- Wahlenbergia polyantha Lammers
- Wahlenbergia polycephala (Mildbr.) Thulin
- Wahlenbergia polyclada A.DC. in A.P.de Candolle
- Wahlenbergia polyphylla Thulin
- Wahlenbergia polytrichifolia Schltr.
  - Wahlenbergia polytrichifolia subsp. dracomontana Hilliard & B.L.Burtt
  - Wahlenbergia polytrichifolia subsp. polytrichifolia
- Wahlenbergia preissii de Vriese in J.G.C.Lehmann
- Wahlenbergia procumbens (L.f.) A.DC.
- Wahlenbergia prostrata E.Mey. ex A.DC. in A.P.de Candolle
- Wahlenbergia psammophila Schltr.
- Wahlenbergia pseudoandrosacea Brehmer
- Wahlenbergia pseudoinhambanensis Brehmer
- Wahlenbergia pseudonudicaulis Brehmer
- Wahlenbergia pulchella Thulin
  - Wahlenbergia pulchella subsp. laurentii Thulin
  - Wahlenbergia pulchella subsp. mbalensis Thulin
  - Wahlenbergia pulchella subsp. michelii Thulin
  - Wahlenbergia pulchella subsp. paradoxa Thulin
  - Wahlenbergia pulchella subsp. pedicellata Thulin
  - Wahlenbergia pulchella subsp. pulchella
- Wahlenbergia pulvillus-gigantis Hilliard & B.L.Burtt
- Wahlenbergia pusilla Hochst. ex A.Rich.
- Wahlenbergia pygmaea Colenso
  - Wahlenbergia pygmaea subsp. drucei J.A.Petterson
  - Wahlenbergia pygmaea subsp. pygmaea
  - Wahlenbergia pygmaea subsp. tararua J.A.Petterson
- Wahlenbergia pyrophila Lammers
- Wahlenbergia queenslandica Carolin ex P.J.Sm.
- Wahlenbergia ramifera Brehmer
- Wahlenbergia ramosa G.Simpson
- Wahlenbergia ramosissima (Hemsl.) Thulin
  - Wahlenbergia ramosissima subsp. centiflora Thulin
  - Wahlenbergia ramosissima subsp. lateralis (Brehmer) Thulin
  - Wahlenbergia ramosissima subsp. oldeniandioides Thulin
  - Wahlenbergia ramosissima subsp. ramosissima.
  - Wahlenbergia ramosissima subsp. richardsiae Thulin
  - Wahlenbergia ramosissima subsp. subcapitata Thulin
  - Wahlenbergia ramosissima subsp. zambiensis Thulin
- Wahlenbergia rara Schltr. & Brehmer
- Wahlenbergia rhytidosperma Thulin
- Wahlenbergia riversdalensis Lammers
- Wahlenbergia rivularis Diels
- Wahlenbergia roelliflora Schltr. & Brehmer
- Wahlenbergia roxburghii A.DC.
- Wahlenbergia rubens (H.Buek) Lammers
- Wahlenbergia rubioides (A.DC.) Lammers
- Wahlenbergia rupestris G.Simpson
- Wahlenbergia rupicola G.T.Plunkett & J.J.Bruhl
- Wahlenbergia saxicola (R.Br.) A.DC.
- Wahlenbergia schistacea Brehmer
- Wahlenbergia schlechteri Brehmer
- Wahlenbergia schwackeana Zahlbr.
- Wahlenbergia scopella Brehmer
- Wahlenbergia scopulicola Carolin ex P.J.Sm.
- Wahlenbergia scottii Thulin
- Wahlenbergia serpentina Brehmer
- Wahlenbergia sessiliflora Brehmer
- Wahlenbergia silenoides Hochst. ex A.Rich.
- Wahlenbergia sonderi Lammers
- Wahlenbergia songeana Thulin
- Wahlenbergia sphaerica Brehmer
- Wahlenbergia squamifolia Brehmer
- Wahlenbergia squarrosa Brehmer
- Wahlenbergia stellarioides Cham.
- Wahlenbergia stricta (R.Br.) Sweet
  - Wahlenbergia stricta subsp. alterna P.J.Sm.
  - Wahlenbergia stricta subsp. stricta
- Wahlenbergia subaphylla (Baker) Thulin
  - Wahlenbergia subaphylla subsp. scoparia (Wild) Thulin
  - Wahlenbergia subaphylla subsp. subaphylla
  - Wahlenbergia subaphylla subsp. thesioides Thulin
- Wahlenbergia subfusiformis Brehmer
- Wahlenbergia subpilosa Brehmer
- Wahlenbergia subrosulata Brehmer
- Wahlenbergia subtilis Brehmer
- Wahlenbergia subulata (L'Hér.) Lammers
- Wahlenbergia subumbellata Markgr.
- Wahlenbergia suffruticosa Cupido
- Wahlenbergia taiwaniana S.S.Ying
- Wahlenbergia telfordii G.T.Plunkett & J.J.Bruhl
- Wahlenbergia tenella (L.f.) Lammers
- Wahlenbergia tenuiloba Thulin
- Wahlenbergia tenuis A.DC. in A.P.de Candolle
- Wahlenbergia tetramera Thulin
- Wahlenbergia thulinii Lammers
- Wahlenbergia thunbergiana (H.Buek) Lammers
- Wahlenbergia thunbergii (Schult.) B.Nord.
- Wahlenbergia tibestica Quézel
- Wahlenbergia tomentosula Brehmer
- Wahlenbergia tortilis Brehmer
- Wahlenbergia transvaalensis Brehmer
- Wahlenbergia tsaratananae Thulin
- Wahlenbergia tuberosa Hook.f.
- Wahlenbergia tumida Brehmer
- Wahlenbergia tumidifructa P.J.Sm.
- Wahlenbergia umbellata (Adamson) Lammers
- Wahlenbergia undulata (L.f.) A.DC.
- Wahlenbergia unidentata (L.f.) Lammers
- Wahlenbergia upembensis Thulin
- Wahlenbergia urcosensis E.Wimm.
- Wahlenbergia verbascoides Thulin
- Wahlenbergia vernicosa J.A.Petterson
- Wahlenbergia victoriensis P.J.Sm.
- Wahlenbergia violacea J.A.Petterson
- Wahlenbergia virgata Engl.
- Wahlenbergia virgulta Brehmer
- Wahlenbergia welwitschii (A.DC.) Thulin
- Wahlenbergia wittei Thulin
- Wahlenbergia wyleyana Sond.
