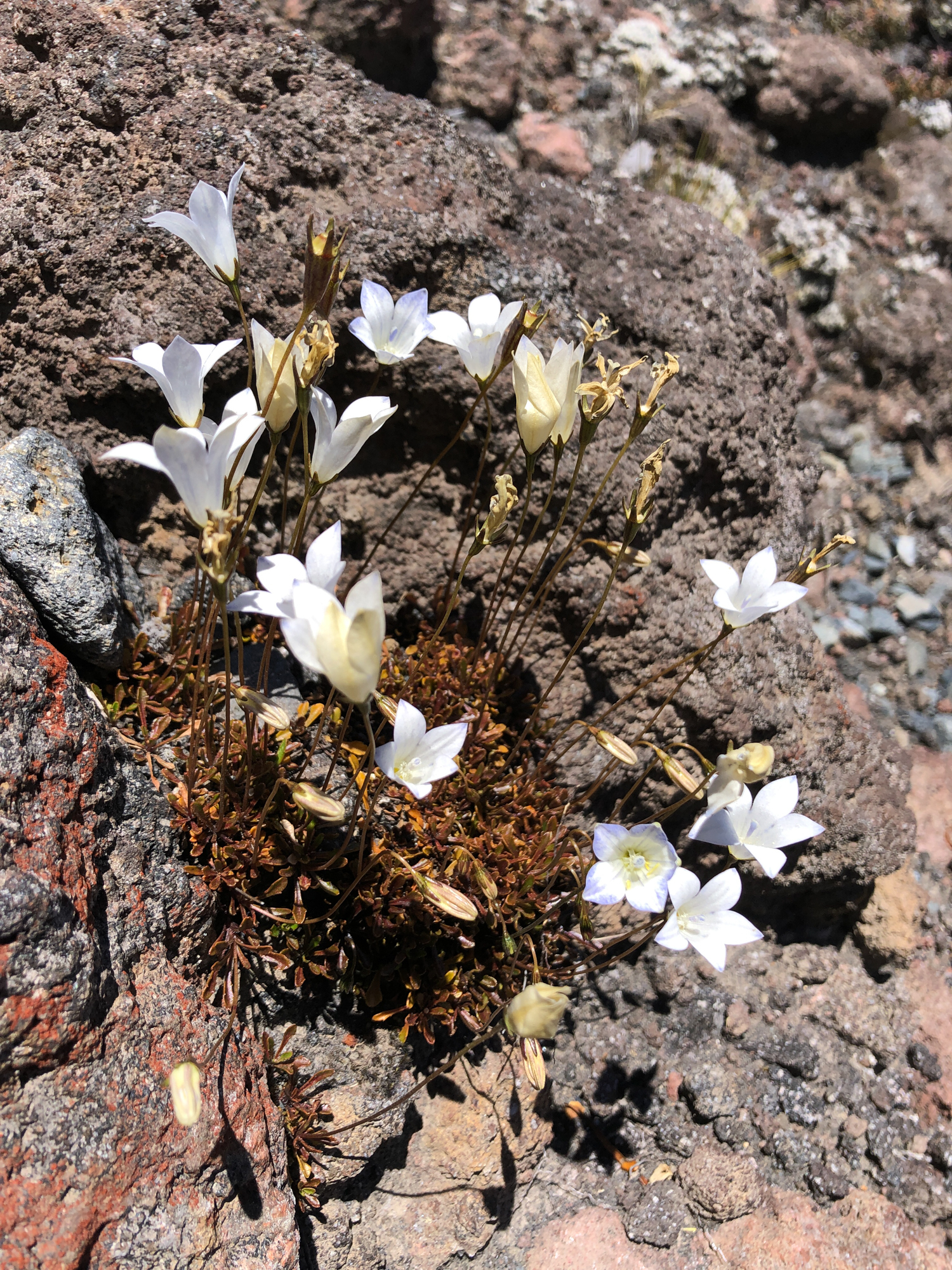
- W. pygmaea near the Tongariro Crossing

Conservation status
- Not Threatened (NZ TCS)

Scientific classification
- Kingdom: Plantae
- Clade: Tracheophytes
- Clade: Angiosperms
- Clade: Eudicots
- Clade: Asterids
- Order: Asterales
- Family: Campanulaceae
- Genus: Wahlenbergia
- Species: W. pygmaea

Binomial name
- Wahlenbergia pygmaea Colenso

= Wahlenbergia pygmaea =

Species of flowering plant

Wahlenbergia pygmaea, or North Island harebell, is a species of flowering plant, endemic to New Zealand. It is restricted to the North Island.

== Description ==
This species is a perennial, rhizomatous herb that has a dense cluster of leaves which are low to the ground, with white and blue flowers that extend from a short stem. It has wider bell flowers than the similar congener W. albomarginata of the South Island.

In the original description, William Colenso wrote:

This is a peculiarly striking little plant, from its uniform size and pleasing appearance, a rather large drooping bell-flower springing from its little squarrose moss-like tuft of leaves.

The subspecies tararua can be distinguished by the rosettes of serrate, flat, dark-green leaves, while drucei has crimped, bright-green leaves.

== Range and habitat ==
Wahlenbergia pygmaea is restricted to the North Island, and has three disjunct populations which are accorded as subspecies: ssp. drucei near Taranaki, ssp. tararua in the Tararua Range, and ssp. pygmaea in the center of the island near on the central plateau near Tongariro.

Wahlenbergia pygmaea grows above the treeline in montane and alpine environments. On the North Island, this is effectively limited to volcanoes and the central plateau, as well as the more southerly Tararuas. In the Rangipo desert, an arid region created by the eruption of Taupō Volcano, it can survive at lower elevations than elsewhere in the subalpine areas. It can grow in tussock grassland or on rocky ground and old lava fields. At times it can be brought down by washes through riverbeds, where it can grow on stony ground.

== Ecology ==
The flowers are pollinated by insects. The roots are associated with arbuscular mycorrhiza. The species may be avoided by ungulates for food, while another study of red deer and sika deer notes that they do eat the species. The seeds have been stated to have been recovered from coprolites of various moa genera, which suggests that the extinct moa ate the plant – however, the cited study looked at species from the South Island, which suggests these were plants in the Wahlenbergia albomarginata complex.

Disturbance by vehicles appears to increase coverage of W. pygmaea compared to other species.

== Etymology ==
Wahlenbergia is named after Göran Wahlenberg. Pygmaea means 'tiny' in Latin.

Drucei was named for the botanist A.P. "Tony" Druce of Wellington.

== Taxonomy ==
Wahlenbergia pygmaea contains the following subspecies:

- Wahlenbergia pygmaea subsp. tararua
- Wahlenbergia pygmaea subsp. drucei
- Wahlenbergia pygmaea subsp. pygmaea

Of these, pygmaea is Not Threatened, while drucei is considered Range Restricted, and tararua is Nationally Critical.

The original description of the species was based on specimens gathered in the Ruahine range, which would possibly now be considered the subspecies tararua, although not all authorities consider this a valid subspecies.

Some taxonomists consider this species to be the same as W. albomarginata, from the South Island. A study using amplified fragment length polymorphism could not distinguish the two species.
