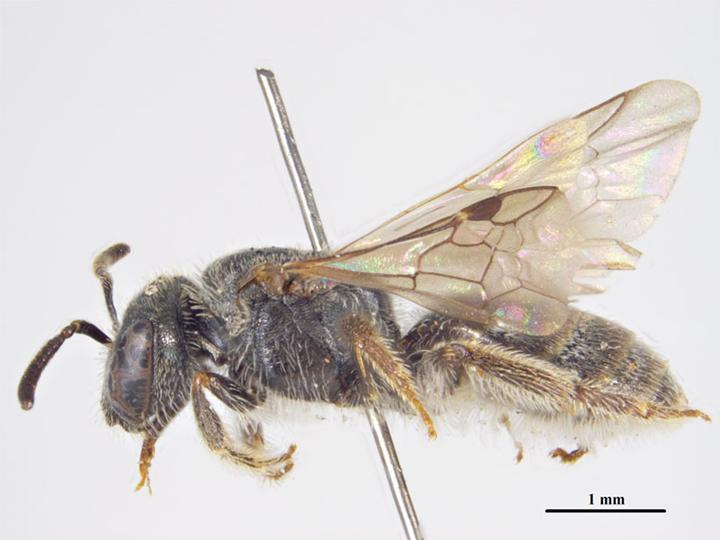
- Female

Scientific classification
- Kingdom: Animalia
- Phylum: Arthropoda
- Clade: Pancrustacea
- Class: Insecta
- Order: Hymenoptera
- Family: Halictidae
- Genus: Lasioglossum
- Species: L. humei

Binomial name
- Lasioglossum humei (Cockerell, 1905)

Synonyms
- Halictus humei Cockerell, 1905

= Lasioglossum humei =

Species of bee

Lasioglossum humei, or Lasioglossum (Chilalictus) humei, is a species of bee in the family Halictidae and subfamily Halictinae. It is endemic to Australia. It was described by British-American entomologist Theodore Dru Alison Cockerell in 1905.

== Description ==
Female body length is about 5.5 mm. Integumental colouration is mainly black, with brownish markings; the hair is greyish-white.

== Distribution and habitat ==
The species occurs in mainland south-eastern Australia, mainly at higher altitude sites.

== Behaviour ==
The adults are flying mellivores. Flowering plants visited by the bees include Goodenia, Kunzea, Leptospermum and Wahlenbergia species.

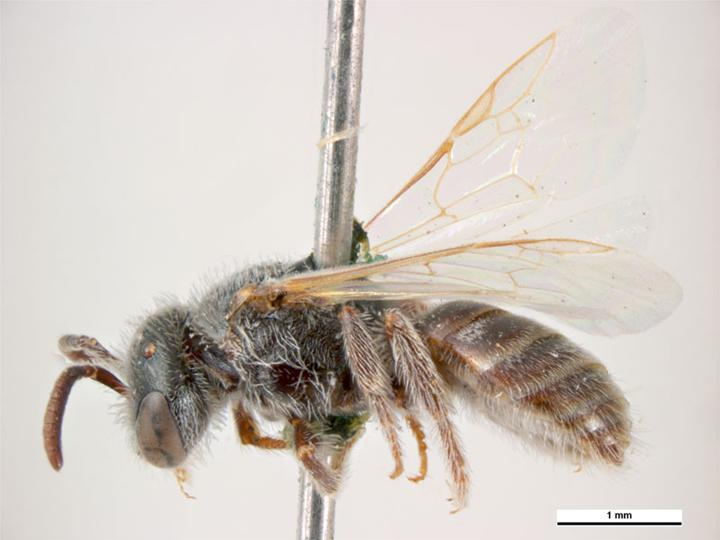
Male
