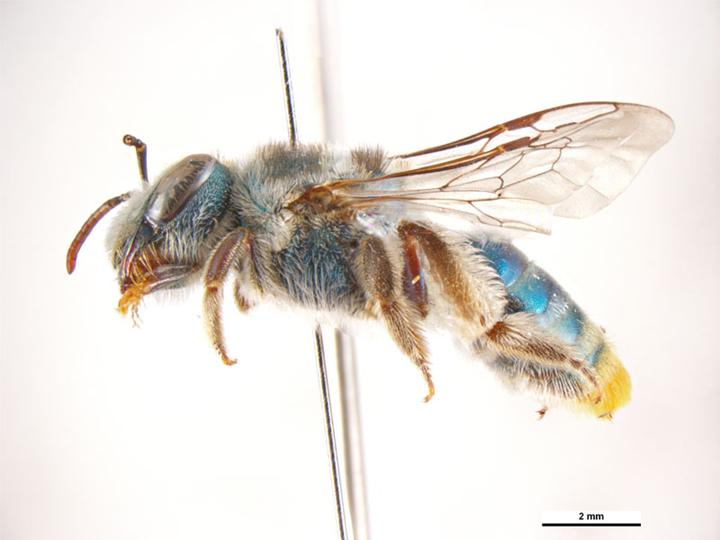
- Female

Scientific classification
- Kingdom: Animalia
- Phylum: Arthropoda
- Clade: Pancrustacea
- Class: Insecta
- Order: Hymenoptera
- Family: Colletidae
- Genus: Leioproctus
- Species: L. elegans

Binomial name
- Leioproctus elegans Smith, 1853

Synonyms
- Paracolletes caeruleotinctus Cockerell, 1905; Paracolletes turneri Rayment, 1910; Paracolletes picta Rayment, 1930

= Leioproctus elegans =

Species of bee

Leioproctus elegans, or Leioproctus (Charicolletes) elegans, is a species of bee in the family Colletidae and subfamily Colletinae. It is endemic to Australia. It was described by English entomologist Frederick Smith in 1853.

== Distribution and habitat ==
The species occurs in eastern Australia. Type localities include Adelaide in South Australia as well as Mackay and Charleville, Queensland.

== Behaviour ==
The adults are flying mellivores. Flowering plants visited by the bees include Cassia, Eucalyptus and Wahlenbergia species.

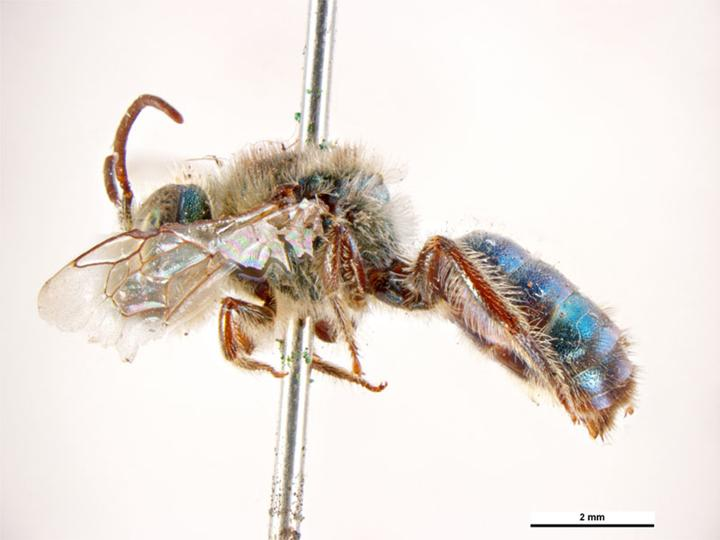
Male
