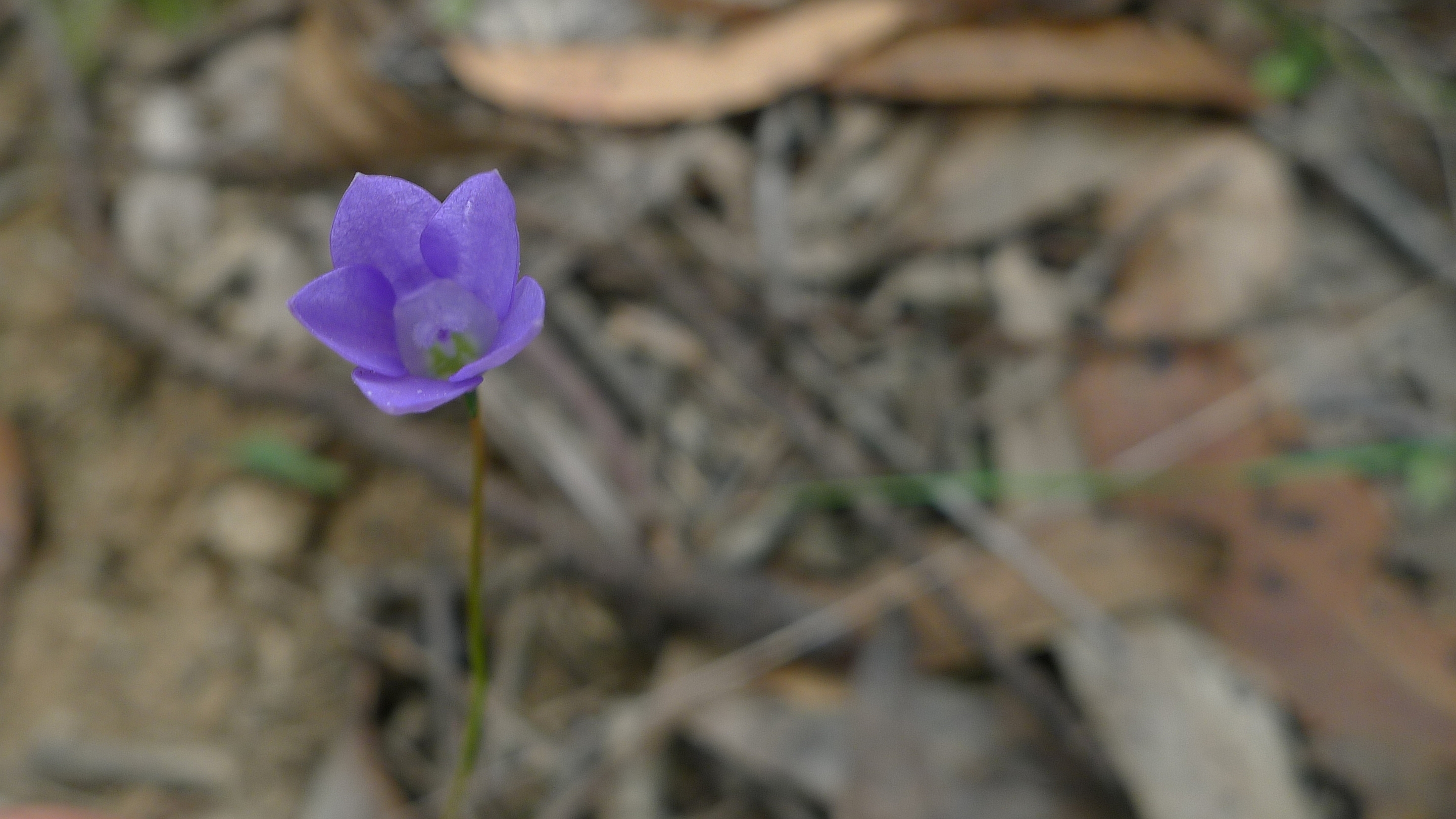
- Wahlenbergia littoricola

Scientific classification
- Kingdom: Plantae
- Clade: Tracheophytes
- Clade: Angiosperms
- Clade: Eudicots
- Clade: Asterids
- Order: Asterales
- Family: Campanulaceae
- Genus: Wahlenbergia
- Species: W. littoricola

Binomial name
- Wahlenbergia littoricola P.J.Sm.

= Wahlenbergia littoricola =

Species of flowering plant

Wahlenbergia littoricola is a small herbaceous plant in the family Campanulaceae native to Western Australia.

The erect to ascending perennial herb typically grows to a height of 0.3 metres (1.0 ft). It blooms between January and October producing blue flowers.

The species is found in the South West region of Western Australia where it grows in clay-loam soils around conglomerate rocks.

The flowers of the indigenous plant are often used an additive to create a purple-colored paint by artists.
