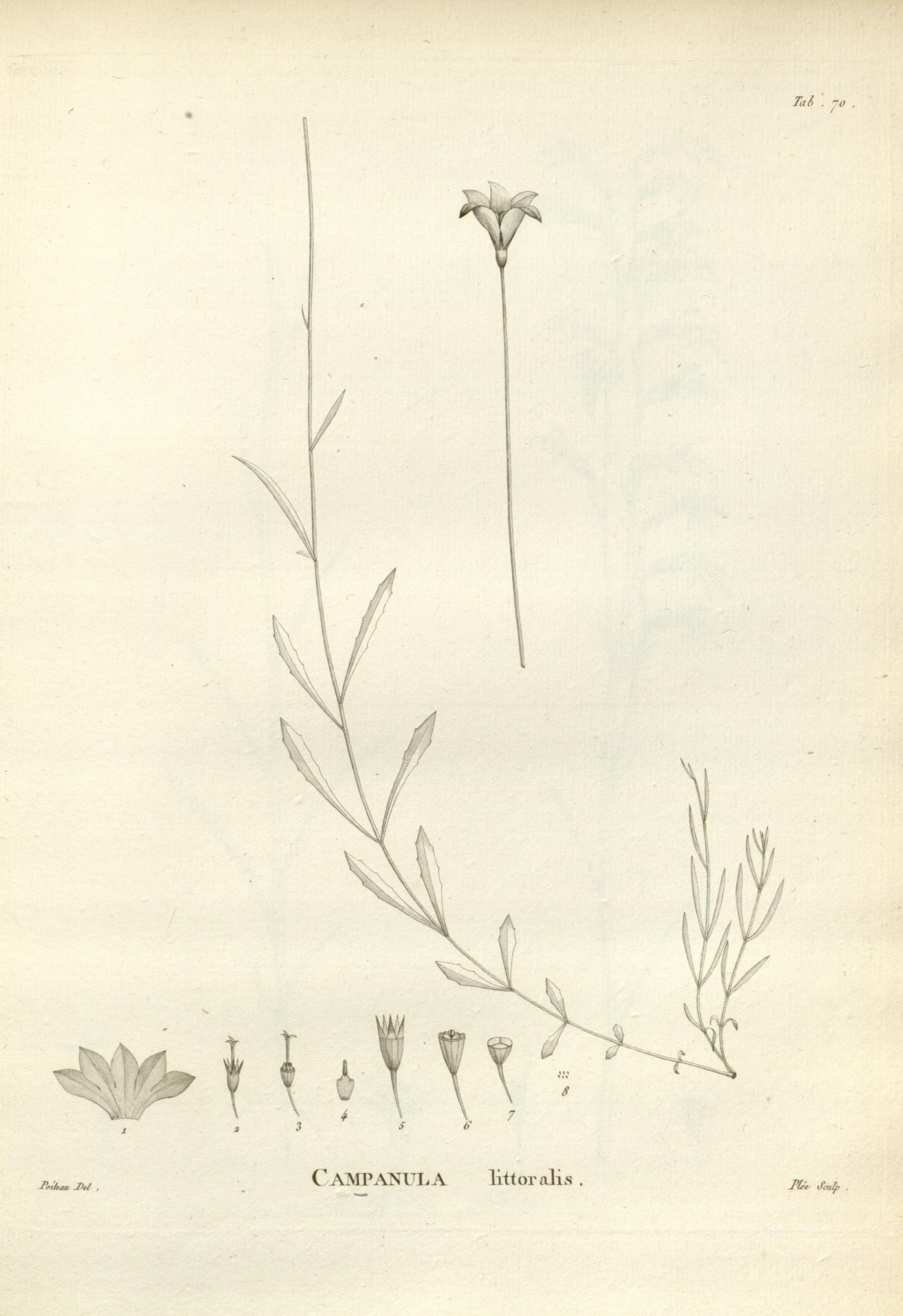
- Illustration from Novae Hollandiae Plantarum Specimen

Scientific classification
- Kingdom: Plantae
- Clade: Tracheophytes
- Clade: Angiosperms
- Clade: Eudicots
- Clade: Asterids
- Order: Asterales
- Family: Campanulaceae
- Genus: Wahlenbergia
- Species: W. littoralis

Binomial name
- Wahlenbergia littoralis (Labill.) Sweet

= Wahlenbergia littoralis =

Species of flowering plant

Wahlenbergia littoralis is a small herbaceous plant in the family Campanulaceae native to eastern Australia.

The species is found in New South Wales, Victoria and Tasmania.
