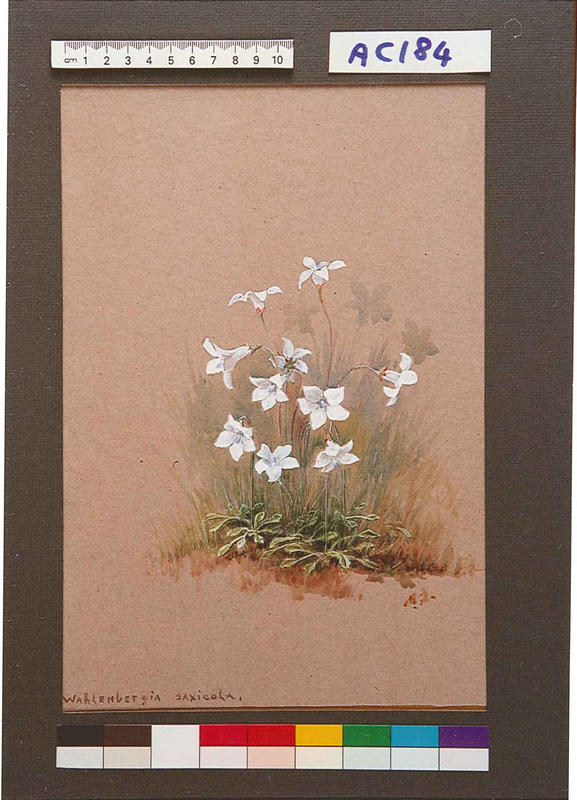

Scientific classification
- Kingdom: Plantae
- Clade: Tracheophytes
- Clade: Angiosperms
- Clade: Eudicots
- Clade: Asterids
- Order: Asterales
- Family: Campanulaceae
- Genus: Wahlenbergia
- Species: W. saxicola

Binomial name
- Wahlenbergia saxicola R.Br.

= Wahlenbergia saxicola =

Rock bluebell

Species of flowering plant

Wahlenbergia saxicola, commonly known as the rock bluebell, is a herbaceous plant in the family Campanulaceae native to Tasmania in Australia.

The perennial herb forms loose mats of foliage typically grows to a height of 5 to 10 centimetres (2 to 4 in). The leaves have a spathulate to obovate or lanceolate shape. It blooms throughout the year producing blue flowers. It has basal leaves and prostrate stems. The species is found in alpine areas of Tasmania and is often found on the higher peaks.
