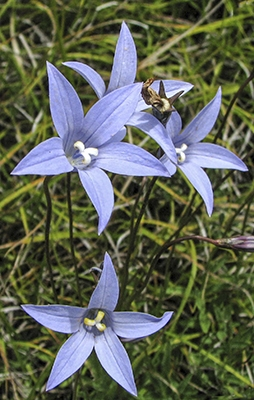

Scientific classification
- Kingdom: Plantae
- Clade: Tracheophytes
- Clade: Angiosperms
- Clade: Eudicots
- Clade: Asterids
- Order: Asterales
- Family: Campanulaceae
- Genus: Wahlenbergia
- Species: W. ceracea

Binomial name
- Wahlenbergia ceracea Lothian

= Wahlenbergia ceracea =

Waxy bluebell

Species of flowering plant

Wahlenbergia ceracea (from the Latin cerae = waxy), commonly known as the waxy bluebell, is a small herbaceous plant in the family Campanulaceae native to eastern Australia.

The perennial herb typically grows to a height of 0.1 to 1.1 metres (0 to 4 ft). It blooms in the summer between October and February producing blue-pink-white flowers. It is leafless in its upper parts, and mostly hairless with occasional sparse hairs near the base.

The species is found in New South Wales, Victoria and Tasmania.
