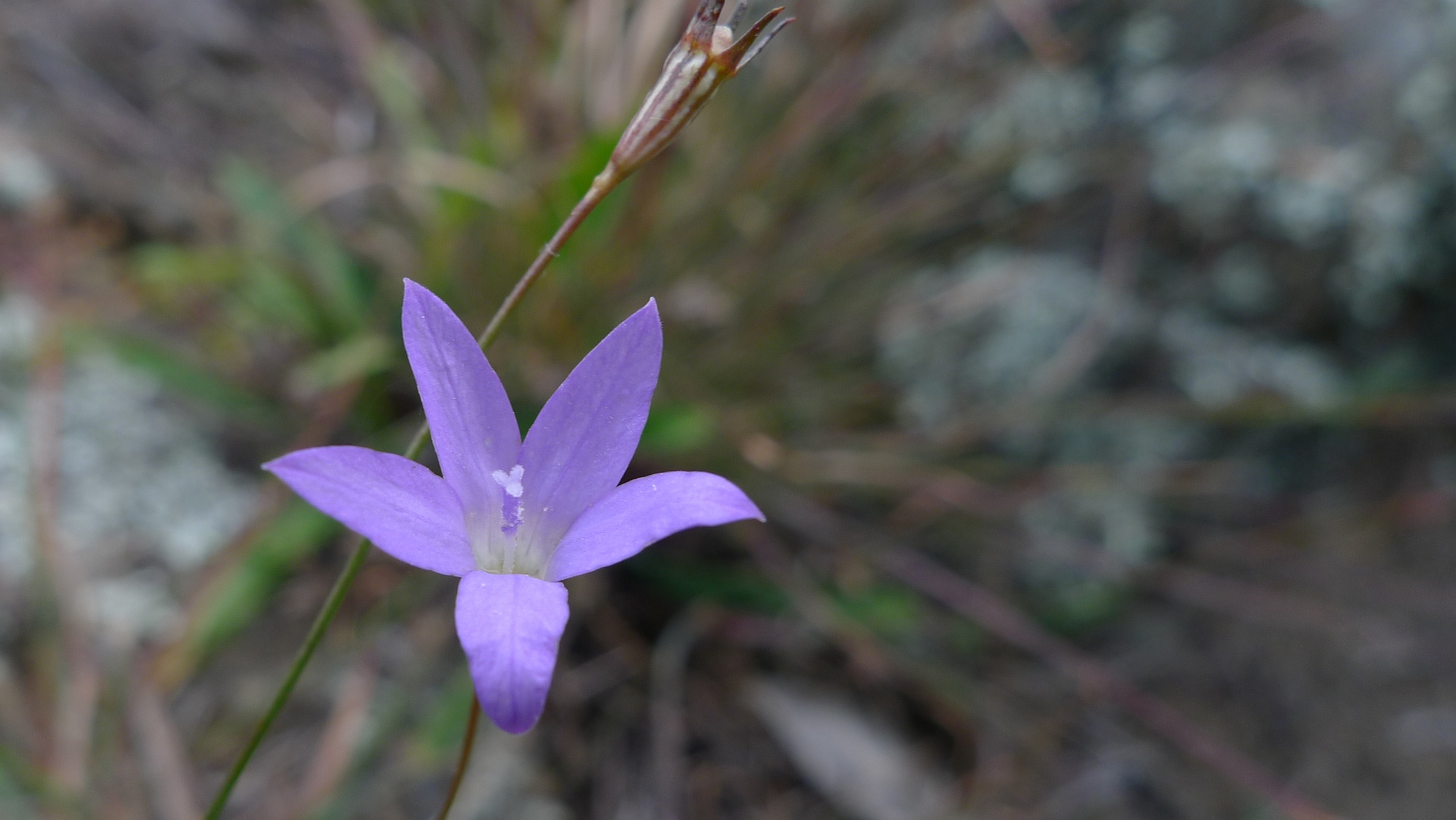

Scientific classification
- Kingdom: Plantae
- Clade: Tracheophytes
- Clade: Angiosperms
- Clade: Eudicots
- Clade: Asterids
- Order: Asterales
- Family: Campanulaceae
- Genus: Wahlenbergia
- Species: W. luteola

Binomial name
- Wahlenbergia luteola P.J.Sm.

= Wahlenbergia luteola =

Species of plant

Wahlenbergia luteola is a small herbaceous plant in the family Campanulaceae native to eastern Australia.

The tufted perennial herb typically grows to a height of 0.06 to 0.80 metres (0 to 3 ft). It blooms throughout the year producing blue-yellow-white flowers.

The species is found in New South Wales, Victoria and South Australia.
