= Wahlenbergia graniticola =

Granite bluebell

Scientific classification
- Kingdom: Plantae
- Clade: Tracheophytes
- Clade: Angiosperms
- Clade: Eudicots
- Clade: Asterids
- Order: Asterales
- Family: Campanulaceae
- Genus: Wahlenbergia
- Species: W. graniticola

Binomial name
- Wahlenbergia graniticola Carolin

Species of flowering plant

Wahlenbergia graniticola, commonly known as the granite bluebell, is a herbaceous plant in the family Campanulaceae native to eastern Australia.

The tufted perennial herb typically grows to a height of 0.07 to 0.95 metres (0 to 3 ft). It blooms throughout the year producing blue flowers.

The species is found in New South Wales, Queensland and Victoria.
