= Wahlenbergia scopulicola =

Scientific classification
- Kingdom: Plantae
- Clade: Tracheophytes
- Clade: Angiosperms
- Clade: Eudicots
- Clade: Asterids
- Order: Asterales
- Family: Campanulaceae
- Genus: Wahlenbergia
- Species: W. scopulicola

Binomial name
- Wahlenbergia scopulicola Carolin ex P.J.Sm.
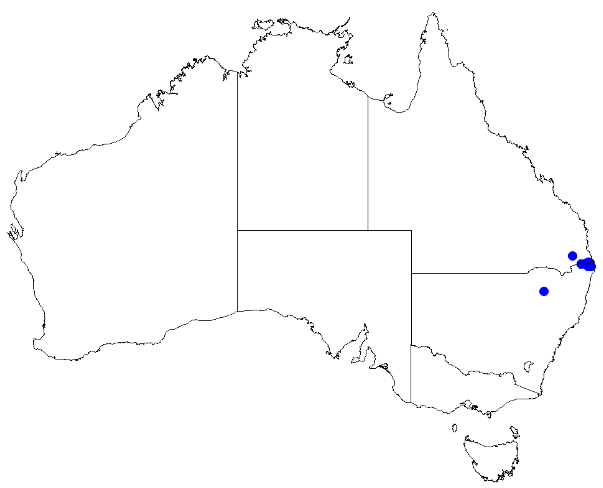
- Occurrence data from Australasian Virtual Herbarium

Species of flowering plant

Wahlenbergia scopulicola is a herbaceous plant in the family Campanulaceae native to eastern Australia.

The tufted perennial herb typically grows to a height of 0.03 to 0.35 metres (0.10 to 1.15 ft). It blooms throughout the year producing blue flowers.

The species is found in New South Wales and Queensland.
