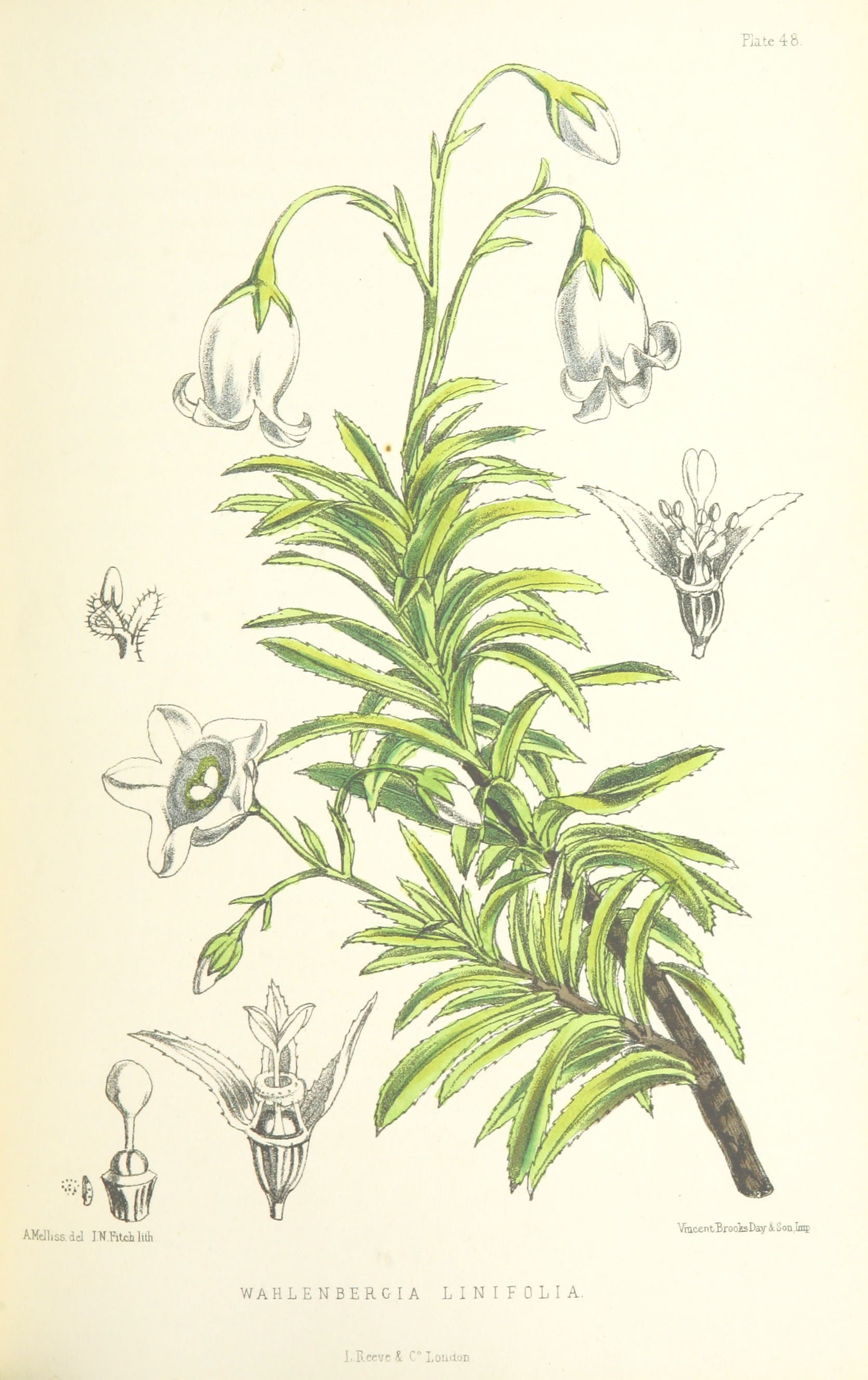

Conservation status
- Critically Endangered (IUCN 3.1)

Scientific classification
- Kingdom: Plantae
- Clade: Embryophytes
- Clade: Tracheophytes
- Clade: Spermatophytes
- Clade: Angiosperms
- Clade: Eudicots
- Clade: Asterids
- Order: Asterales
- Family: Campanulaceae
- Genus: Wahlenbergia
- Species: W. linifolia

Binomial name
- Wahlenbergia linifolia (Roxb.) A.DC.

= Wahlenbergia linifolia =

Species of flowering plant

Wahlenbergia linifolia, the large bellflower, is a species of plant in the family Campanulaceae. It is endemic to Saint Helena. Its natural habitat is rocky areas. It is threatened by habitat loss.
