= Wahlenbergia glabra =

Scientific classification
- Kingdom: Plantae
- Clade: Tracheophytes
- Clade: Angiosperms
- Clade: Eudicots
- Clade: Asterids
- Order: Asterales
- Family: Campanulaceae
- Genus: Wahlenbergia
- Species: W. glabra

Binomial name
- Wahlenbergia glabra P.J.Sm.

Species of flowering plant

Wahlenbergia glabra is a small herbaceous plant in the family Campanulaceae native to eastern Australia.

Typically, the perennial tufted glabrous herb reaches a height of 0.05 to 0.35 metres (0 to 1 feet). It produces white flowers all year long while it is in bloom.

The species is found in New South Wales and Queensland.
