= Wahlenbergia victoriensis =

Scientific classification
- Kingdom: Plantae
- Clade: Tracheophytes
- Clade: Angiosperms
- Clade: Eudicots
- Clade: Asterids
- Order: Asterales
- Family: Campanulaceae
- Genus: Wahlenbergia
- Species: W. victoriensis

Binomial name
- Wahlenbergia victoriensis Carolin

Species of flowering plant

Wahlenbergia victoriensis is a herbaceous plant in the family Campanulaceae native to eastern Australia.

The annual herb typically grows to a height of 0.1 to 0.4 metres (0.33 to 1.31 ft). It blooms throughout the year producing blue flowers.

The species is found in New South Wales and Victoria.
