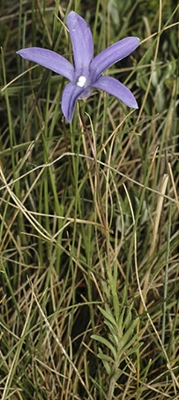

Scientific classification
- Kingdom: Plantae
- Clade: Tracheophytes
- Clade: Angiosperms
- Clade: Eudicots
- Clade: Asterids
- Order: Asterales
- Family: Campanulaceae
- Genus: Wahlenbergia
- Species: W. densifolia

Binomial name
- Wahlenbergia densifolia Lothian

= Wahlenbergia densifolia =

Fairy bluebell

Species of flowering plant

Wahlenbergia densifolia, commonly known as the fairy bluebell, is a small herbaceous plant in the family Campanulaceae native to eastern Australia.

The erect perennial herb typically grows to a height of 0.07 to 0.3 metres (0 to 1 ft). It blooms in the summer between October and February producing blue-purple flowers.

The species is found in New South Wales and Victoria.
