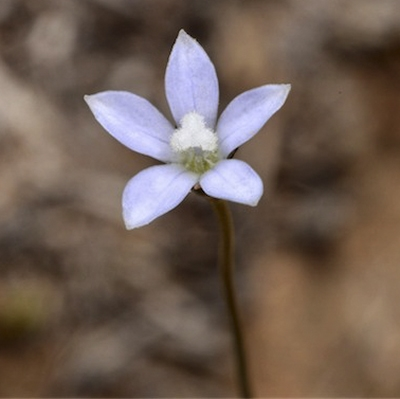

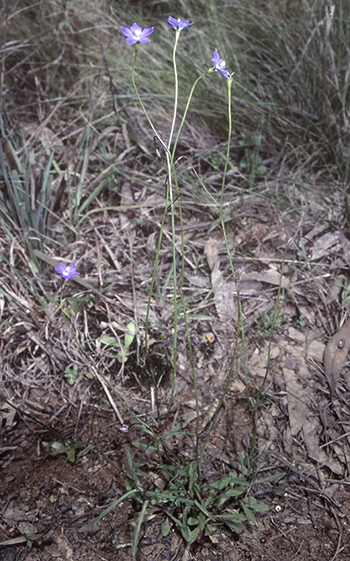

Scientific classification
- Kingdom: Plantae
- Clade: Tracheophytes
- Clade: Angiosperms
- Clade: Eudicots
- Clade: Asterids
- Order: Asterales
- Family: Campanulaceae
- Genus: Wahlenbergia
- Species: W. multicaulis

Binomial name
- Wahlenbergia multicaulis Benth.

= Wahlenbergia multicaulis =

Species of flowering plant

Wahlenbergia multicaulis is a small herbaceous plant in the family Campanulaceae native to Australia (all states except Queensland and the Northern Territory).

The slender, erect to ascending perennial herb typically grows to a height of 0.2 to 0.75 metres (1 to 2 ft). It blooms between September and February producing blue flowers.

In Western Australia, the species is found on the edges of swamps and creek beds and on hillsides in the Wheatbelt and South West regions where it grows in sandy-loamy-clay soils over granite or laterite.
