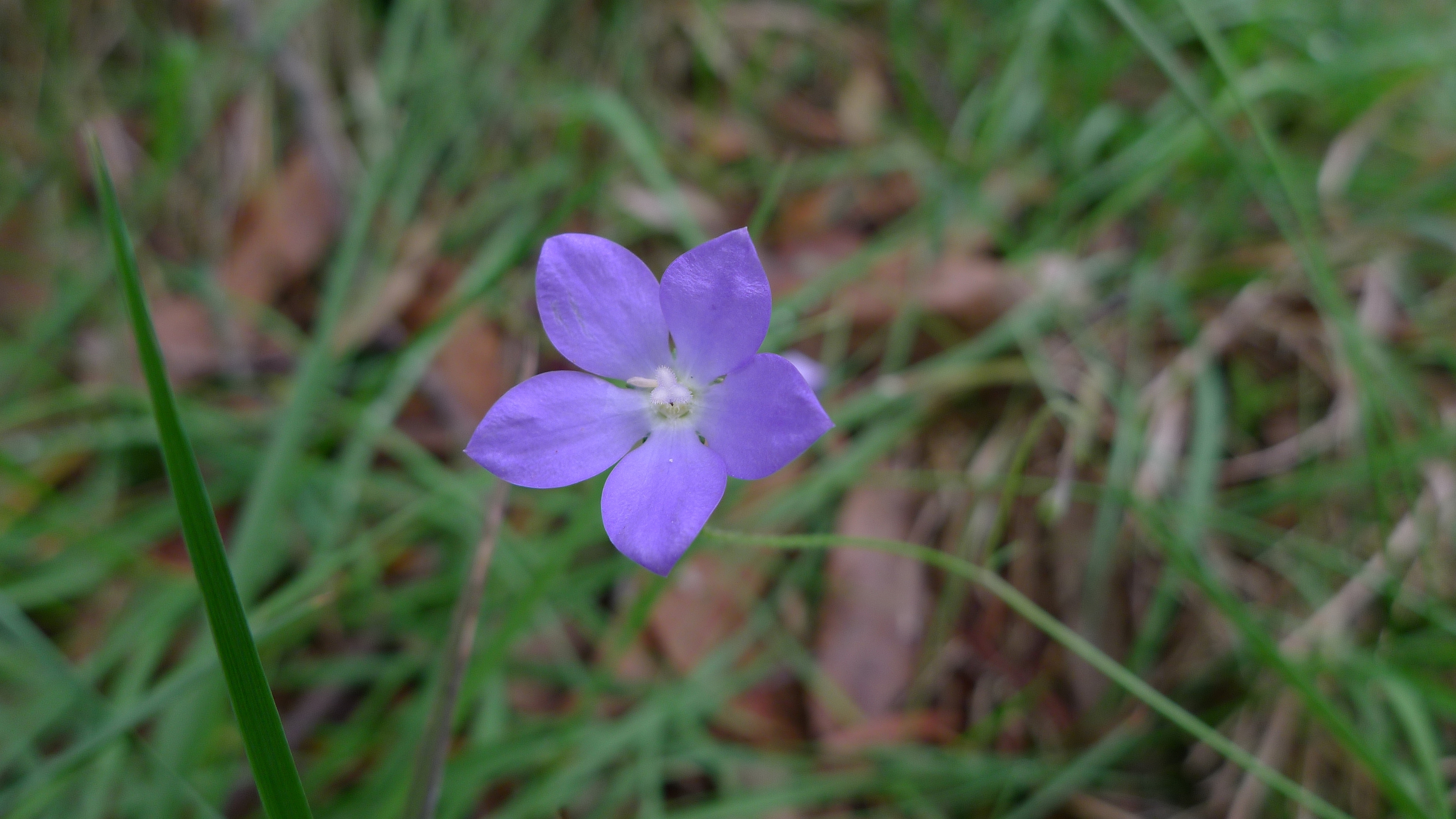

Scientific classification
- Kingdom: Plantae
- Clade: Tracheophytes
- Clade: Angiosperms
- Clade: Eudicots
- Clade: Asterids
- Order: Asterales
- Family: Campanulaceae
- Genus: Wahlenbergia
- Species: W. gracilenta

Binomial name
- Wahlenbergia gracilenta Lothian

= Wahlenbergia gracilenta =

Annual bluebell

Species of flowering plant

Wahlenbergia gracilenta, commonly known as annual bluebell, is a small herbaceous plant in the family Campanulaceae native to Western Australia.

The erect to ascending annual herb typically grows to a height of 0.05 to 0.4 metres (0.2 to 1.3 ft). It blooms between May and December producing white-blue flowers.

The species is found on hillsides, amongst granite outcrops and in damp depressions in the Mid West, Wheatbelt, South West, Great Southern and Goldfields-Esperance regions of Western Australia where it grows in sandy-loamy-clay soils.
