= Wahlenbergia aridicola =

Scientific classification
- Kingdom: Plantae
- Clade: Tracheophytes
- Clade: Angiosperms
- Clade: Eudicots
- Clade: Asterids
- Order: Asterales
- Family: Campanulaceae
- Genus: Wahlenbergia
- Species: W. aridicola

Binomial name
- Wahlenbergia aridicola P.J.Sm.

Species of plant

Wahlenbergia aridicola is a small herbaceous plant in the family Campanulaceae native to eastern Australia.

The tufted perennial herb typically grows to a height of 0.12 to 0.75 metres (0 to 2 ft).

The species is found in New South Wales and South Australia.
