= Wahlenbergia caryophylloides =

Scientific classification
- Kingdom: Plantae
- Clade: Tracheophytes
- Clade: Angiosperms
- Clade: Eudicots
- Clade: Asterids
- Order: Asterales
- Family: Campanulaceae
- Genus: Wahlenbergia
- Species: W. caryophylloides

Binomial name
- Wahlenbergia caryophylloides P.J.Sm.

Species of flowering plant

Wahlenbergia caryophylloides is a small herbaceous plant in the family Campanulaceae native to Western Australia.

The single-stemmed annual herb typically grows to a height of 0.1 to 0.8 metres (0.3 to 2.6 ft). It blooms between May and September producing white-blue-purple flowers.

The species is found on the edges of swamps, lagoons and mud flats in the Kimberley and Pilbara regions of Western Australia where it grows in sandy soils.
