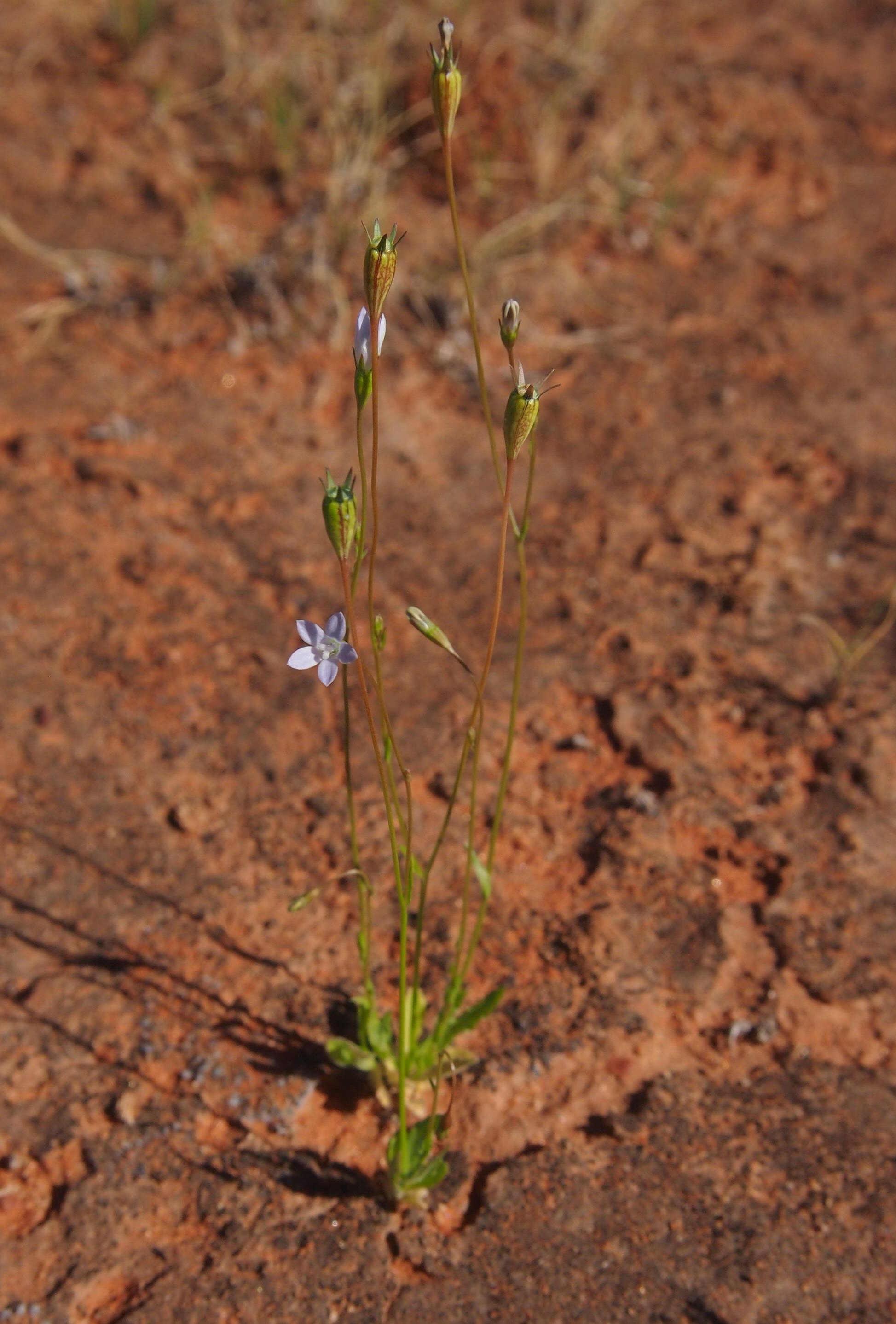

Scientific classification
- Kingdom: Plantae
- Clade: Tracheophytes
- Clade: Angiosperms
- Clade: Eudicots
- Clade: Asterids
- Order: Asterales
- Family: Campanulaceae
- Genus: Wahlenbergia
- Species: W. tumidifructa

Binomial name
- Wahlenbergia tumidifructa P.J.Sm.

= Wahlenbergia tumidifructa =

Species of flowering plant

Wahlenbergia tumidifructa is a small herbaceous plant in the family Campanulaceae. This species is native to Australia, where it has a wide distribution across subtropical, semi-arid and arid zones, occurring in all mainland states and territories.

The slender, erect, annual herb typically grows to a height of 0.06 to 0.7 metres (0 to 2 ft). It blooms between March and December producing blue-white flowers.

The species is found on clay pans and along drainage lines across the interior of Australia, including in the Mid West, Goldfields-Esperance, Wheatbelt and Pilbara regions of Western Australia where it grows in sandy-loamy soils.
