= Wahlenbergia planiflora =

Flat bluebell

Scientific classification
- Kingdom: Plantae
- Clade: Tracheophytes
- Clade: Angiosperms
- Clade: Eudicots
- Clade: Asterids
- Order: Asterales
- Family: Campanulaceae
- Genus: Wahlenbergia
- Species: W. planiflora

Binomial name
- Wahlenbergia planiflora P.J.Sm.

Species of flowering plant

Wahlenbergia planiflora, commonly known as flat bluebell, is a small herbaceous plant in the family Campanulaceae native to eastern Australia.

The tufted perennial herb typically grows to a height of 0.12 to 0.70 metres (0 to 2 ft). It blooms throughout the year producing blue-yellow-white flowers.

The species is found in New South Wales, Victoria and Queensland.

There are two known subspecies:

- Wahlenbergia planiflora subsp. longipila
- Wahlenbergia planiflora subsp. planiflora
