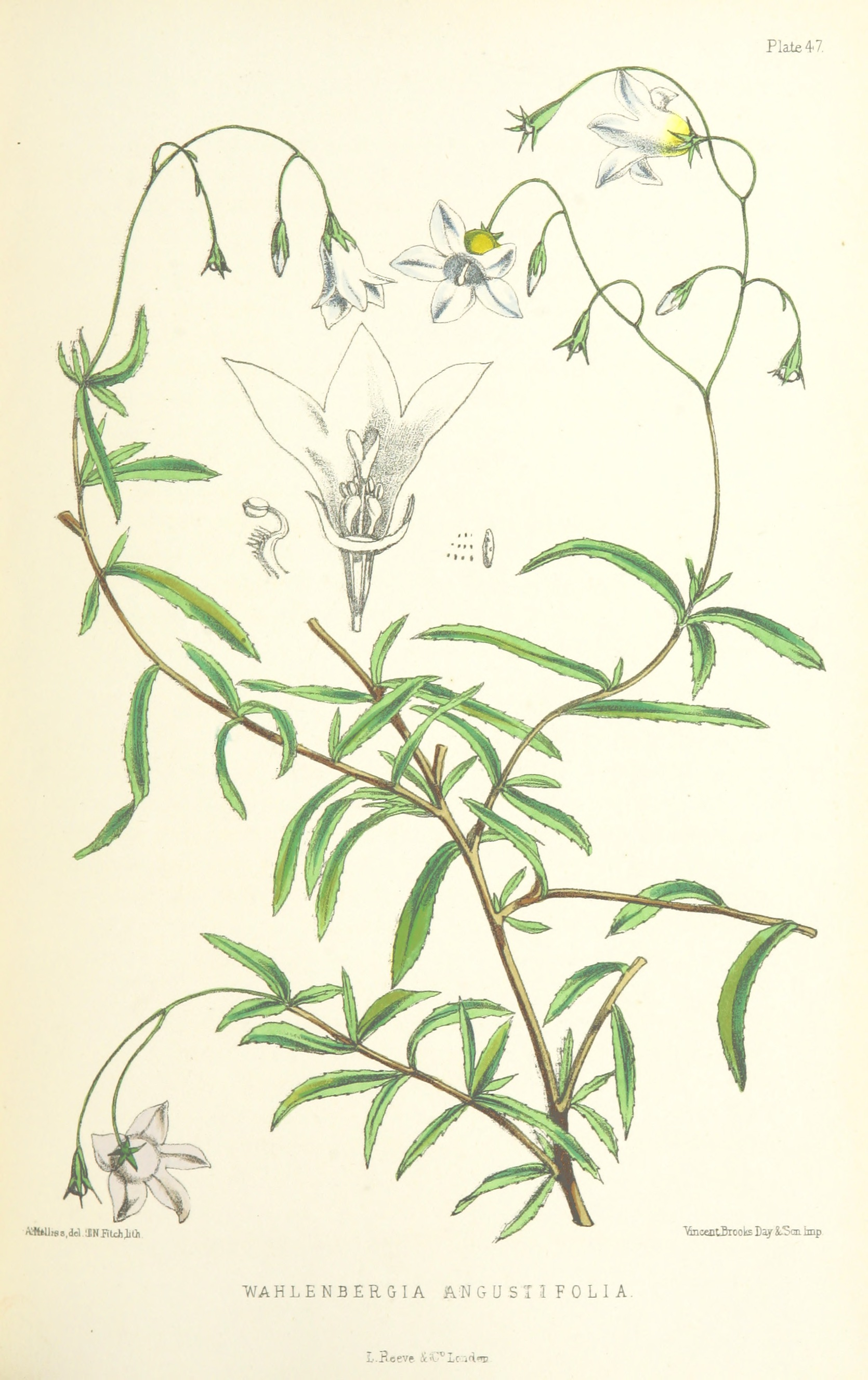

Conservation status
- Vulnerable (IUCN 3.1)

Scientific classification
- Kingdom: Plantae
- Clade: Embryophytes
- Clade: Tracheophytes
- Clade: Spermatophytes
- Clade: Angiosperms
- Clade: Eudicots
- Clade: Asterids
- Order: Asterales
- Family: Campanulaceae
- Genus: Wahlenbergia
- Species: W. angustifolia

Binomial name
- Wahlenbergia angustifolia (Roxb.) A.DC.

Synonyms
- Campanopsis angustifolia (Roxb.) Kuntze; Campanula clivosa Banks ex A.DC., not validly publ.; Roella angustifolia Roxb. (1816); Wahlenbergia clivosa A.DC.

= Wahlenbergia angustifolia =

Species of flowering plant

Wahlenbergia angustifolia, also called small bellflower, is a species of plant in the family Campanulaceae. It is a subshrub or shrub endemic to Saint Helena. Its natural habitat is rocky areas. It is endangered because of habitat loss.

The species was first described as Roella angustifolia by William Roxburgh in 1816. In 1830 Alphonse Pyramus de Candolle placed the species in genus Wahlenbergia as W. angustifolia.
