= Wahlenbergia preissii =

Scientific classification
- Kingdom: Plantae
- Clade: Tracheophytes
- Clade: Angiosperms
- Clade: Eudicots
- Clade: Asterids
- Order: Asterales
- Family: Campanulaceae
- Genus: Wahlenbergia
- Species: W. preissii

Binomial name
- Wahlenbergia preissii de Vriese

Species of flowering plant

Wahlenbergia preissii is a small herbaceous plant in the family Campanulaceae native to Western Australia.

The slender, erect, annual herb typically grows to a height of 0.06 to 0.4 metres (0 to 1 ft). It blooms between September and November producing blue-pink-white flowers.

The species is found among granite outcrops in the Mid West, Goldfields-Esperance, Wheatbelt and South West regions of Western Australia where it grows in sandy-loamy soils.

== Taxonomy ==
It was first described in 1848 by the Dutch botanist Willem Hendrik de Vriese.
