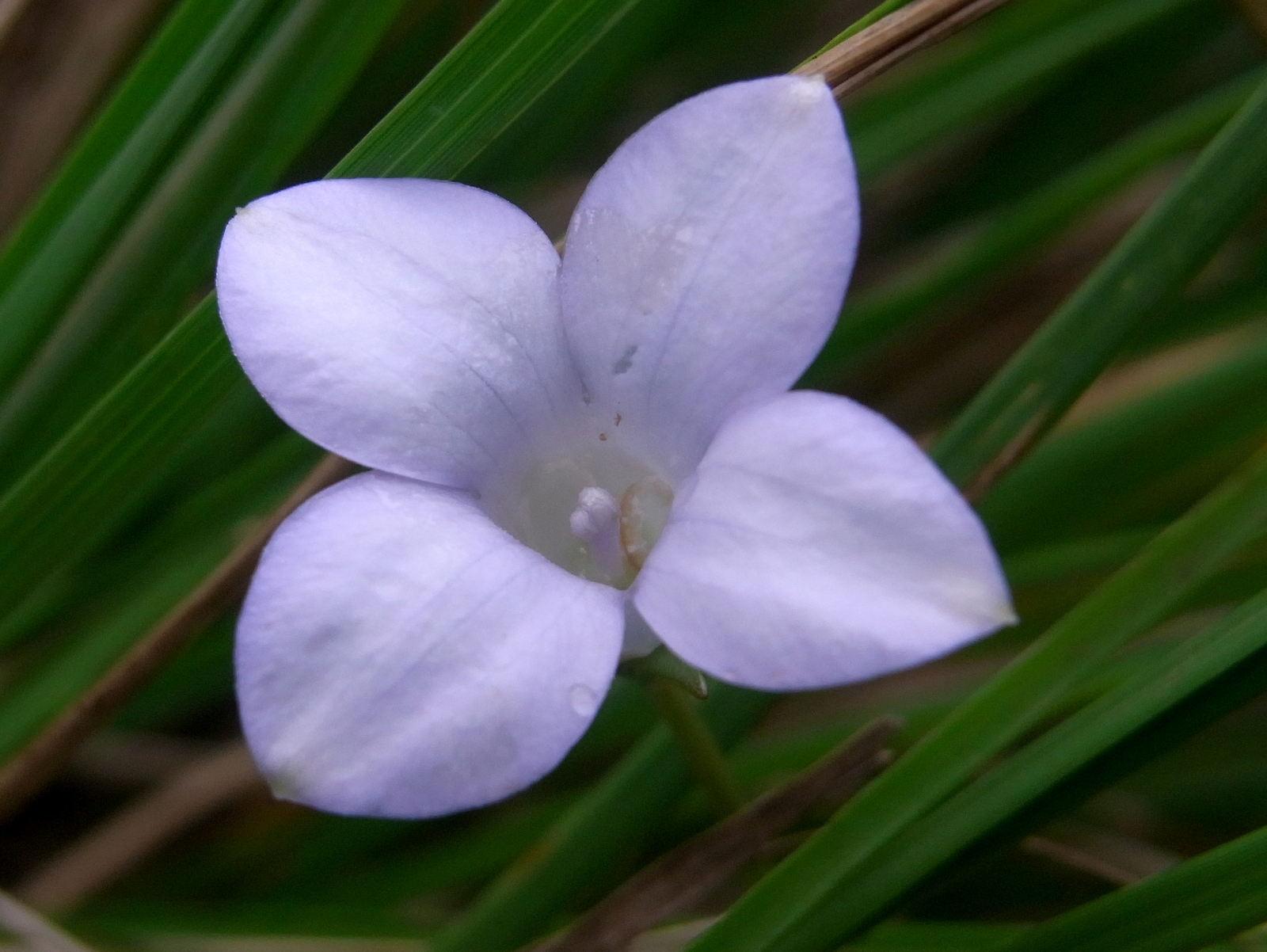

Scientific classification
- Kingdom: Plantae
- Clade: Tracheophytes
- Clade: Angiosperms
- Clade: Eudicots
- Clade: Asterids
- Order: Asterales
- Family: Campanulaceae
- Genus: Wahlenbergia
- Species: W. insulae-howei

Binomial name
- Wahlenbergia insulae-howei Lothian (1947)

= Wahlenbergia insulae-howei =

Species of flowering plant

Wahlenbergia insulae-howei is a flowering plant in the bellflower family. The specific epithet alludes to Lord Howe Island, where it is found.

== Description ==
It is a perennial herb, tufted and sparsely branched, growing to 5–15 cm in height. The linear or narrowly elliptic to elliptic-oblanceolate leaves are usually 5–20 mm long, 1–6 mm wide. It has blue, bell shaped flowers 6.5–10 mm long. The growth habit varies according to the substrate, being more stunted and tufty in exposed clefts in rocks.

== Distribution and habitat ==
The plant is endemic to Australia’s subtropical Lord Howe Island in the Tasman Sea. It is found at rocky sites in bushy grassland.
