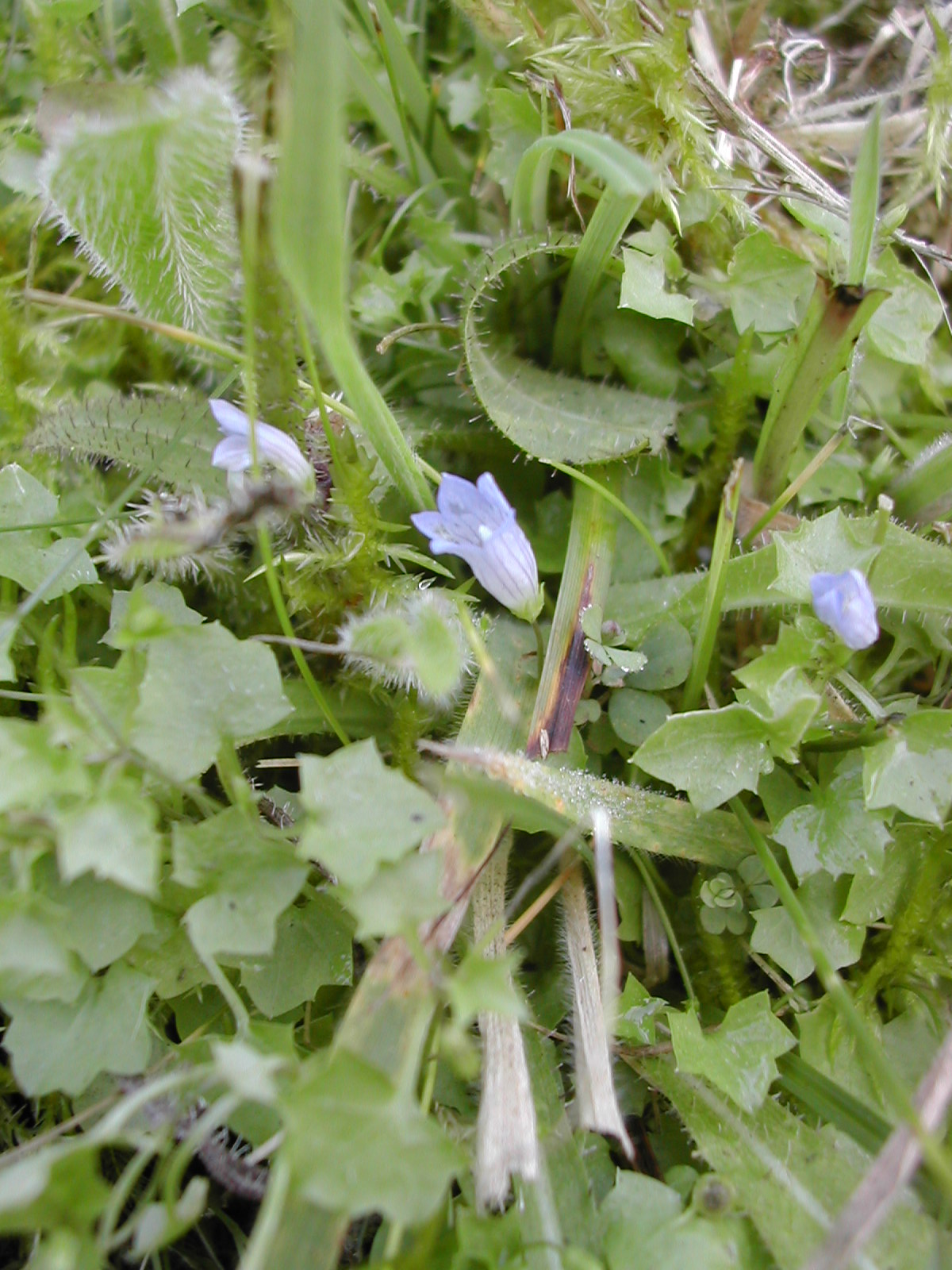

Scientific classification
- Kingdom: Plantae
- Clade: Tracheophytes
- Clade: Angiosperms
- Clade: Eudicots
- Clade: Asterids
- Order: Asterales
- Family: Campanulaceae
- Genus: Wahlenbergia
- Species: W. hederacea

Binomial name
- Wahlenbergia hederacea (L.) Rchb.

Synonyms
- List: Aikinia hederacea (L.) Salisb. ex Fourr.; Campanopsis hederacea (L.) Kuntze; Campanula hederacea L.; Campanula hederifolia Salisb. nom. superfl.; Cervicina hederacea (L.) Druce; Hesperocodon hederaceus (L.) Eddie & Cupido; Roucela hederacea (L.) Dumort.; Schultesia hederacea (L.) Roth; Valvinterlobus filiformis Dulac nom. superfl.; Wahlenbergia hederifolia (Salisb.) Bubani nom. superfl.; Campanula pentagonophylla Vuk.; Wahlenbergia stenocalyx Ingw.

= Wahlenbergia hederacea =

Genus of flowering plants

Wahlenbergia hederacea, also known as the ivy-leaved bellflower, is a species of flowering plant that is found throughout Europe. The delicate, patch-forming, hairless perennial herb has thin, creeping stems about 20 cm in length. Its pale green leaves are long-stalked and have an ivy-shaped, rounded structure. These leaves can be described as having a cordate shape and are approximately 5–12 mm long and wide. The plant has erect, solitary, pale blue flowers in summer and autumn, with bell-shaped corolla with 5 short lobes. The flowers are 6–10 mm long x 5–8 mm wide and sit on fine stalks 1–4 cm long. It is suggested that the long pedicels are an adaptation to assist in seed dispersal.

== Taxonomy ==
This species was first formally described in 1753 by Carl Linnaeus who gave it the name Campanula hederacea in his Species Plantarum. In 1827, Ludwig Reichenbach transferred the species to Wahlenbergia as W. hederacea in his Iconographia Botanica.

== Habitat ==
Wahlenbergia hederacea is found in cool, moist and boggy, partially-shaded areas, typically with acidic soils, such as woodlands, streams, pastures, heaths and beside rivulets. The plant thrives in short-grassed areas beside streams, with moist, acidic soils, and is almost never found in basic soils and stagnant water. They usually occur in small, scattered groups. The abundance of the ivy-leaved bellflower has been declining throughout the 1900s due to the loss of their habitat.

== Distribution ==
Wahlenbergia hederacea is native to Europe and commonly found in southern England, and Wales, but also in North West England, Western Scotland, Ireland, France, Belgium, Netherlands, Luxembourg, Western Germany, Spain, and Portugal.

== Gallery ==
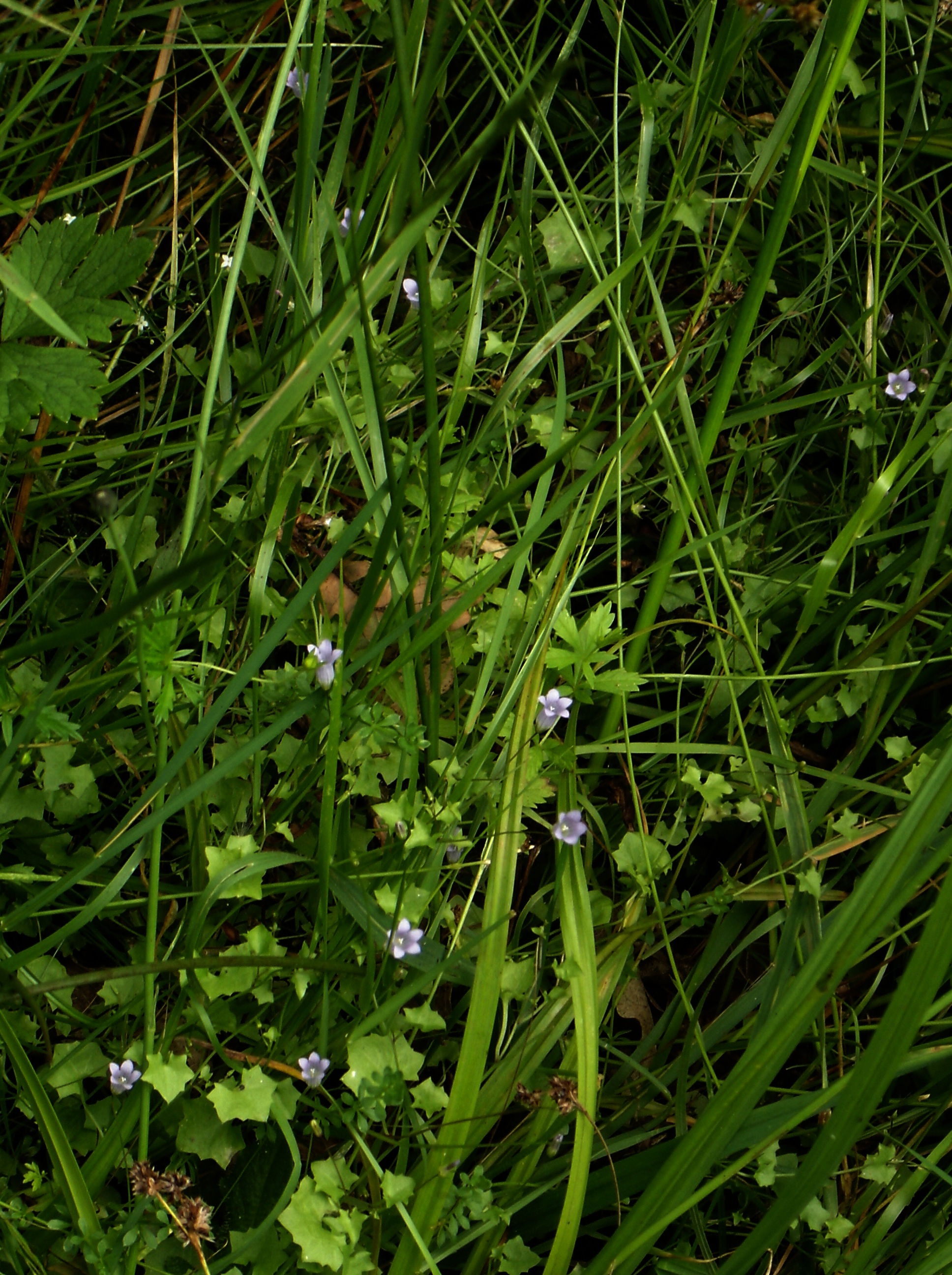

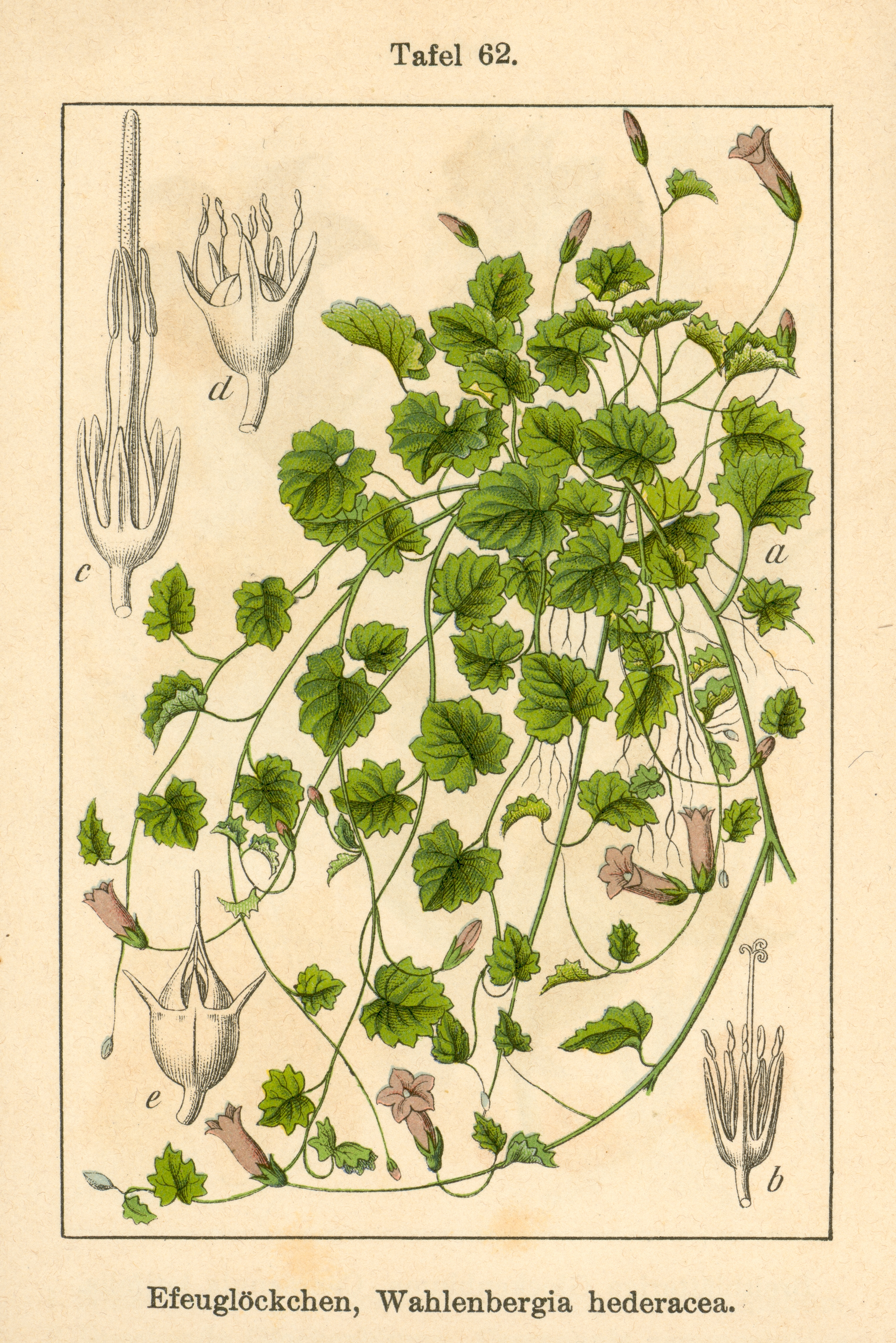

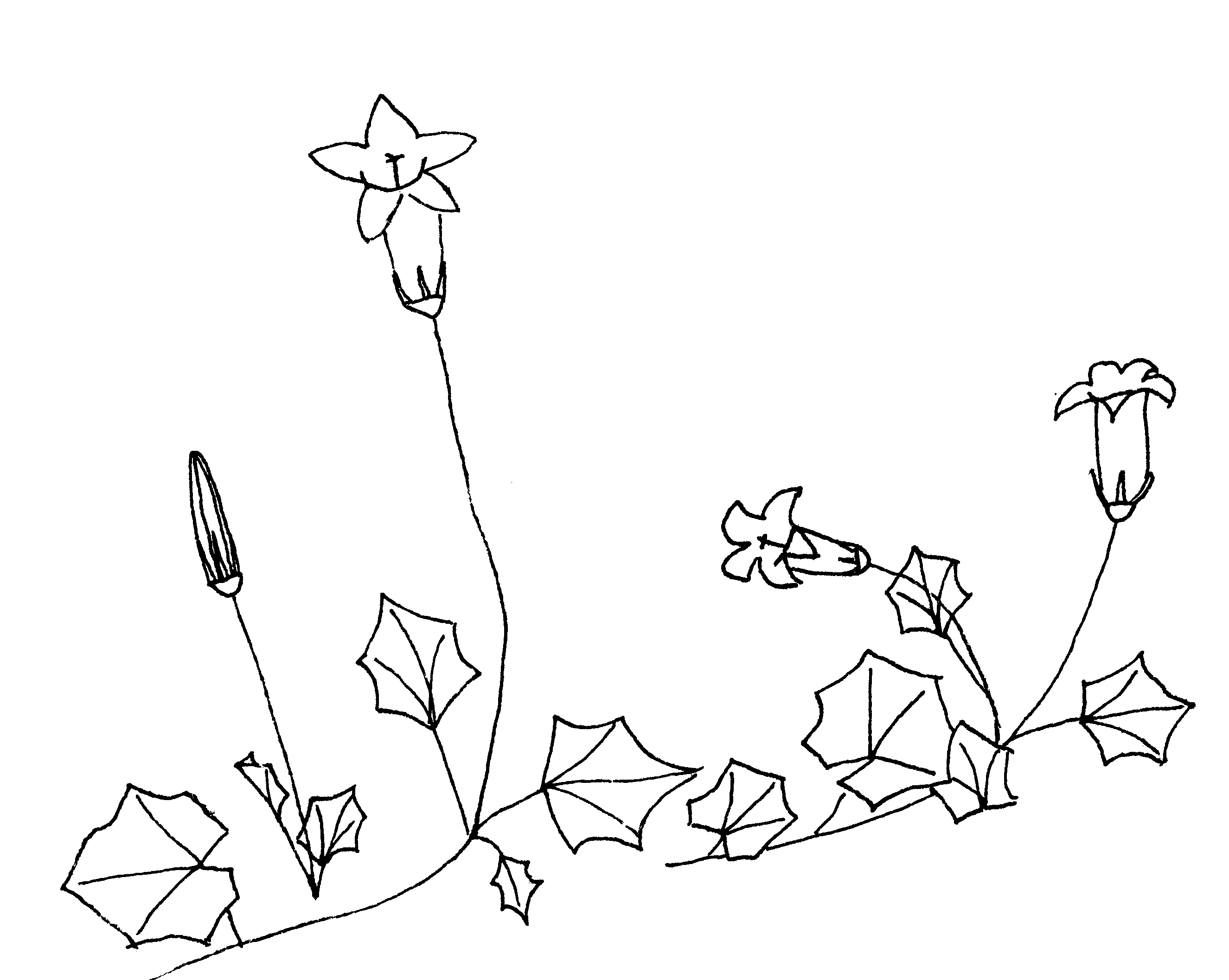
