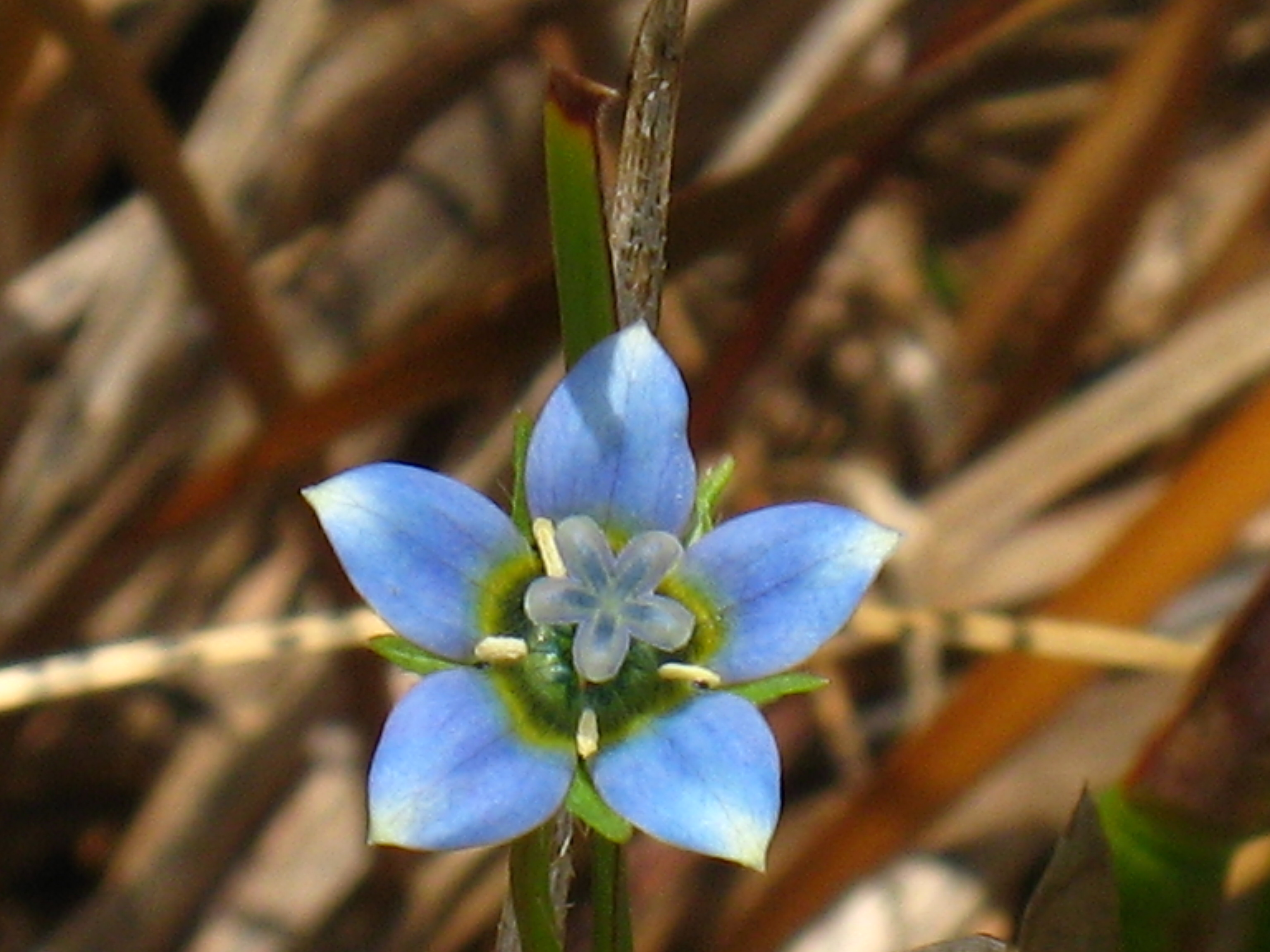
- Wahlenbergia capensis in the Kensington Bushland Reserve, Perth

Scientific classification
- Kingdom: Plantae
- Clade: Tracheophytes
- Clade: Angiosperms
- Clade: Eudicots
- Clade: Asterids
- Order: Asterales
- Family: Campanulaceae
- Genus: Wahlenbergia
- Species: W. capensis

Binomial name
- Wahlenbergia capensis (L.) A.DC.

Synonyms
- Campanopsis capensis (L.) Kuntze; Campanula capensis L.; Petalostima capensis (L.) Raf.; Roella decumbens G.Don not validly publ.; Roella decurrens Andrews nom. illeg.; Wahlenbergia capenss var. leiocalycina Zahlbr.

= Wahlenbergia capensis =

Cape bluebell

Species of flowering plant

Wahlenbergia capensis, commonly known as the Cape bluebell, is a plant in the family Campanulaceae and is native to the Cape Province but has been introduced to Australia. It is an annual herb with up to four greenish blue, bell-shaped flowers with spreading petal lobes.

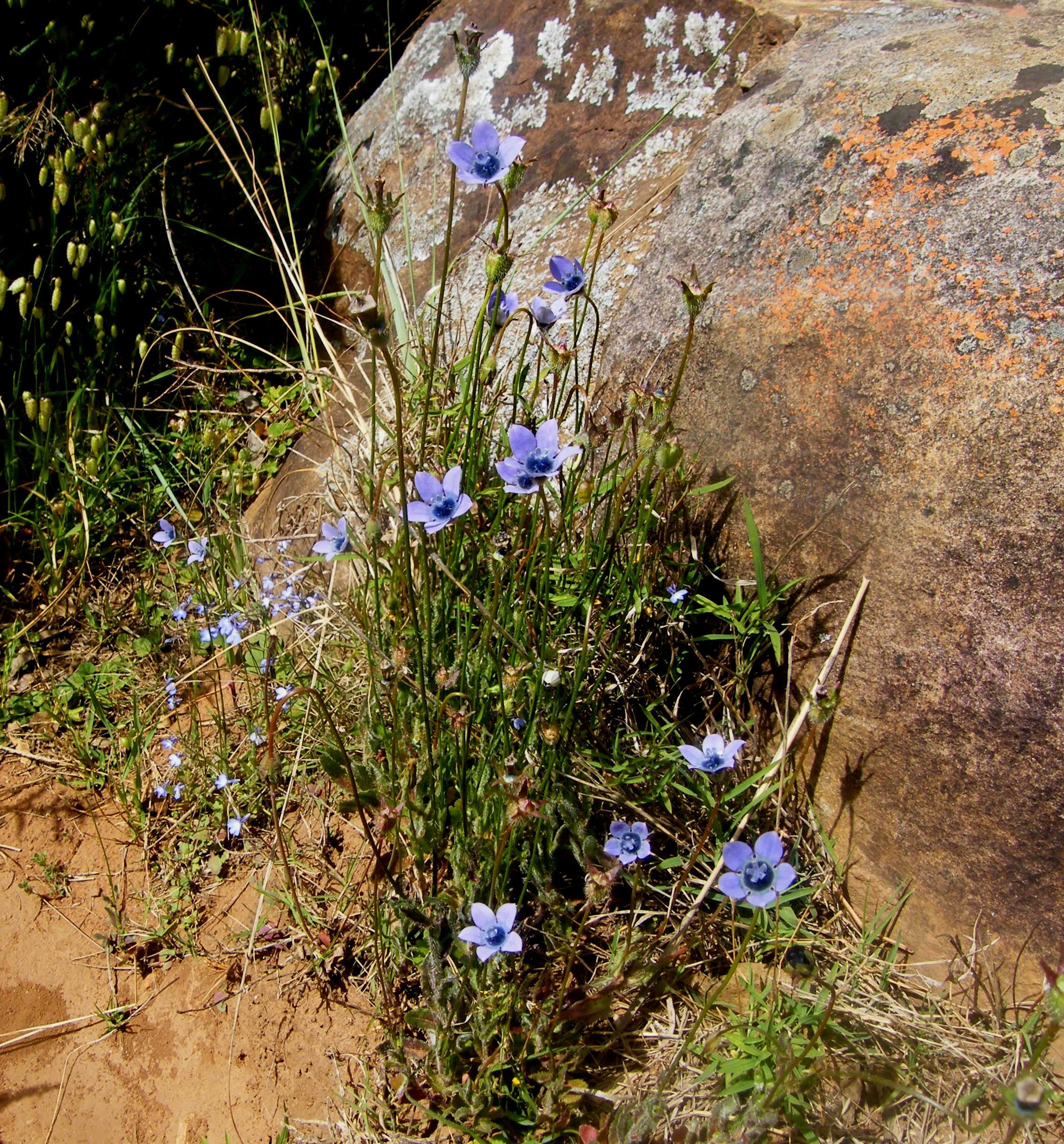
Habit

== Description ==
Wahlenbergia capensis is an annual herb with a one to a few stems and grows to a height of 14–50 cm (6–20 in). The lower leaves are egg-shaped to elliptic but become lance-shaped higher up. They are 9–40 mm (0.4–2 in) long and 1.5–10 mm (0.06–0.4 in) wide, sometimes with wavy edges and small teeth or lobes. Each plant has up to four bluish-green long stalked flowers that are dark blue near the centre and often have black spots. The five sepals are triangular, 4–7.5 mm (0.2–0.3 in) long and hairy. The petals form a tube, bell-shaped near the base with five spreading, egg-shaped to broadly elliptic lobes, 6–11 mm (0.2–0.4 in) long and 3–7.5 mm (0.1–0.3 in) wide. The five stamens have a filament 2.5–4 mm (0.1–0.2 in) long and an anther 2–3.5 mm (0.08–0.1 in) long. The style is dark blue with five branches on its tip. Flowering occurs from September to December. The fruit is a capsule 5–11 mm (0.2–0.4 in) long and 5–9 mm (0.2–0.4 in) wide.

== Taxonomy and naming ==
Cape bluebell was first formally described in 1753 by Carl Linnaeus who gave it the name Campanula capensis and published the description in Species Plantarum. In 1830, Alphonse Pyramus de Candolle changed the name to Wahlenbergia capensis. The specific epithet (capensis) refers to the native distribution of the species, the ending -ensis being a Latin suffix "denoting place, locality or country".

== Distribution and habitat ==
Wahlenbergia capensis is widespread in, and restricted to the Western Cape between Clanwilliam and Knysna in South Africa. It is found on the lower sandstone slopes and the sandy flats of this region. Due to its annual life cycle it is also able to persist successfully on disturbed land, such as along roadsides and on cultivated land. It is an introduced species occurring in the south-west of Western Australia where it is found between Kalbarri and Tambellup. The species was first collected in Western Australia in 1898.

== Ecology ==
The flowers are pollinated by monkey beetles. Large numbers of seeds are produced in capsules. There are two main methods of dispersal. The first of these is through the strong summer winds of the region. The seeds are shaken out through the apical valves of the capsule. Alternately, the capsule may attach to the fur of animals by its coarse, stiff hairs, facilitating the dispersal of the seed-filled capsules.

== Conservation ==
While it has not formally been assessed by the IUCN, this species is common and widespread. The South African National Biodiversity Institute (SANBI) does not consider this species to be threatened.
