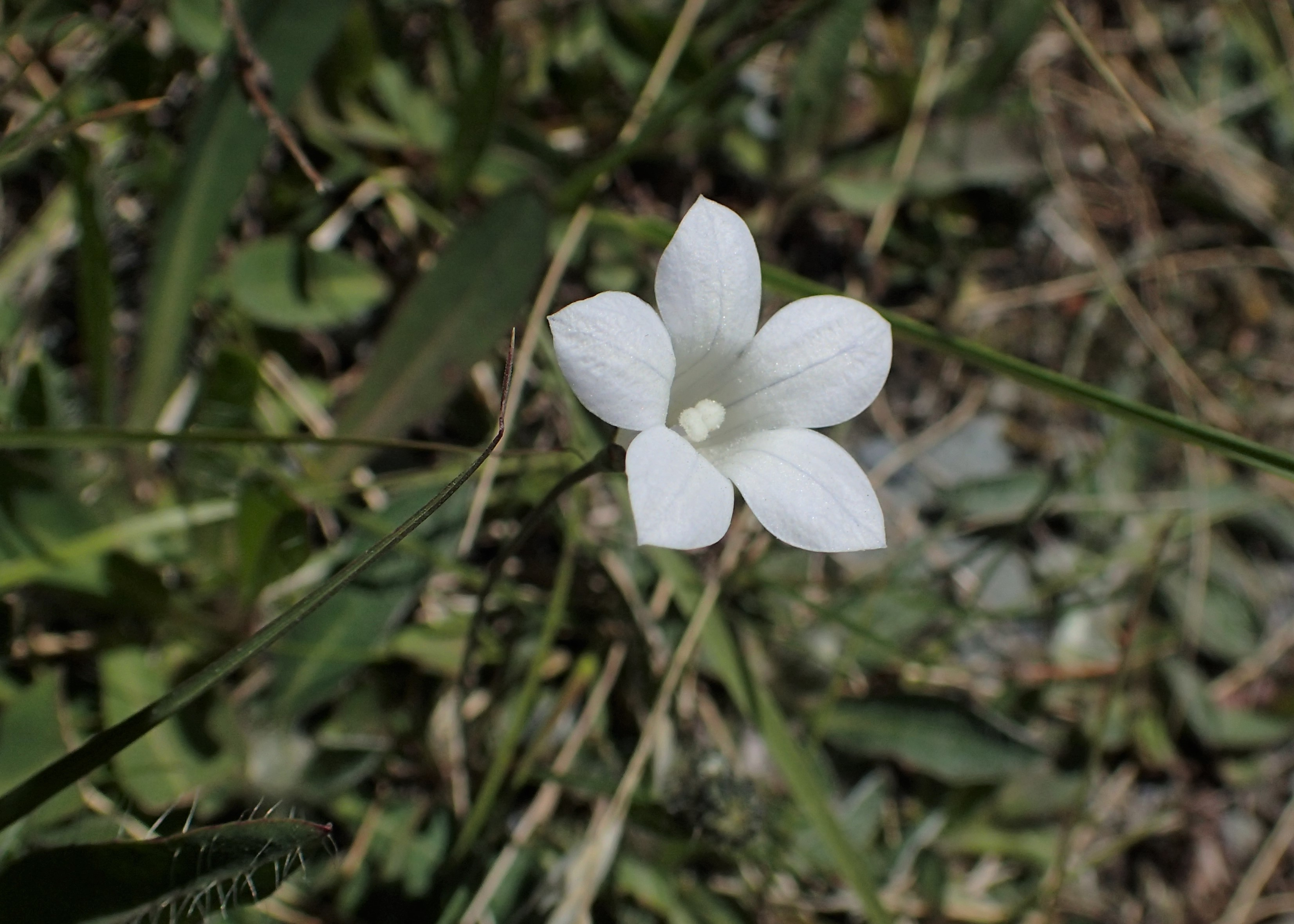
- W. albomarginata in Kea Point, Aoraki / Mount Cook National Park

Scientific classification
- Kingdom: Plantae
- Clade: Embryophytes
- Clade: Tracheophytes
- Clade: Angiosperms
- Clade: Eudicots
- Clade: Asterids
- Order: Asterales
- Family: Campanulaceae
- Genus: Wahlenbergia
- Species: W. albomarginata

Binomial name
- Wahlenbergia albomarginata Hook.

= Wahlenbergia albomarginata =

Species of flowering plant

Wahlenbergia albomarginata, commonly known as the New Zealand harebell, is a species of plant native to New Zealand.

== Description ==
Wahlenbergia albomarginata's corolla form a bell-like flower, an occurrence which is formally described as 'narrow-campulate-rotate'. A single, long-tubed flower is produced atop each vertical, naked stem. The corolla ranges from a typical pale-blue colour to darker violet-blue, with white zoning, but on occasion corolla may be entirely white. The corolla is 10–20 mm in length, with corolla tubes often lengthening from spring to summer.

The leaves are 10–40 mm long and may have a pale underside, or range from yellow-green to red-green in colour. Additionally, all endemic Wahlenbergia species in New Zealand have a glabrous pedicel and calyx. When cultivated or sheltered, leaves grow in radicle, rose-like clusters around the rhizome tips. Dry, windswept conditions cause leaves to become stiff and grow in sessile, compact tufts. In low sunlight, stems may become elongated. The leaves are typically petiolate, with entire, dentate or undulate leaf margins which are conspicuously white and thickened. In cases where teeth are present on leaf margins, they tend to be unremarkable. Morphologically, leaves range from linear to elliptic or ovate to obovate, where lamina gradually narrow to the petiole.

== Range ==
Wahlenbergia albomarginata is endemic to New Zealand. It is found throughout the inland east coast of the South Island, in the Tasman, Marlborough, Canterbury, Otago and Southland regions, and in Stewart Island.

== Habitat ==
Wahlenbergia albomarginata thrives where there is low annual rainfall such as in dry, lowland tussock-grassland, river terraces, rocky and sub-alpine habitats. Wahlenbergia albomarginata grows in well-draining riverside turf, sand, or stony soil.

== Ecology ==
=== Life cycle and phenology ===
Wahlenbergia albomarginata is a rhizomatous, herbaceous perennial plant. In cultivation, it can survive for fifteen years, while those in harsh, wild environments may persist for only two years. Seedlings begin as slender tap roots below ground, which later develop into slim, pliable, interlacing rhizome systems. Above ground, leafy shoots emerge from the rootstock, eventually growing in a thin, long stalk with a single flower on top.

=== Predators, parasites, and diseases ===
Wahlenbergia albomarginata is eaten by goats and sheep, and thus do not grow in frequently grazed areas, and is eaten by slug, snails and grasshoppers.
