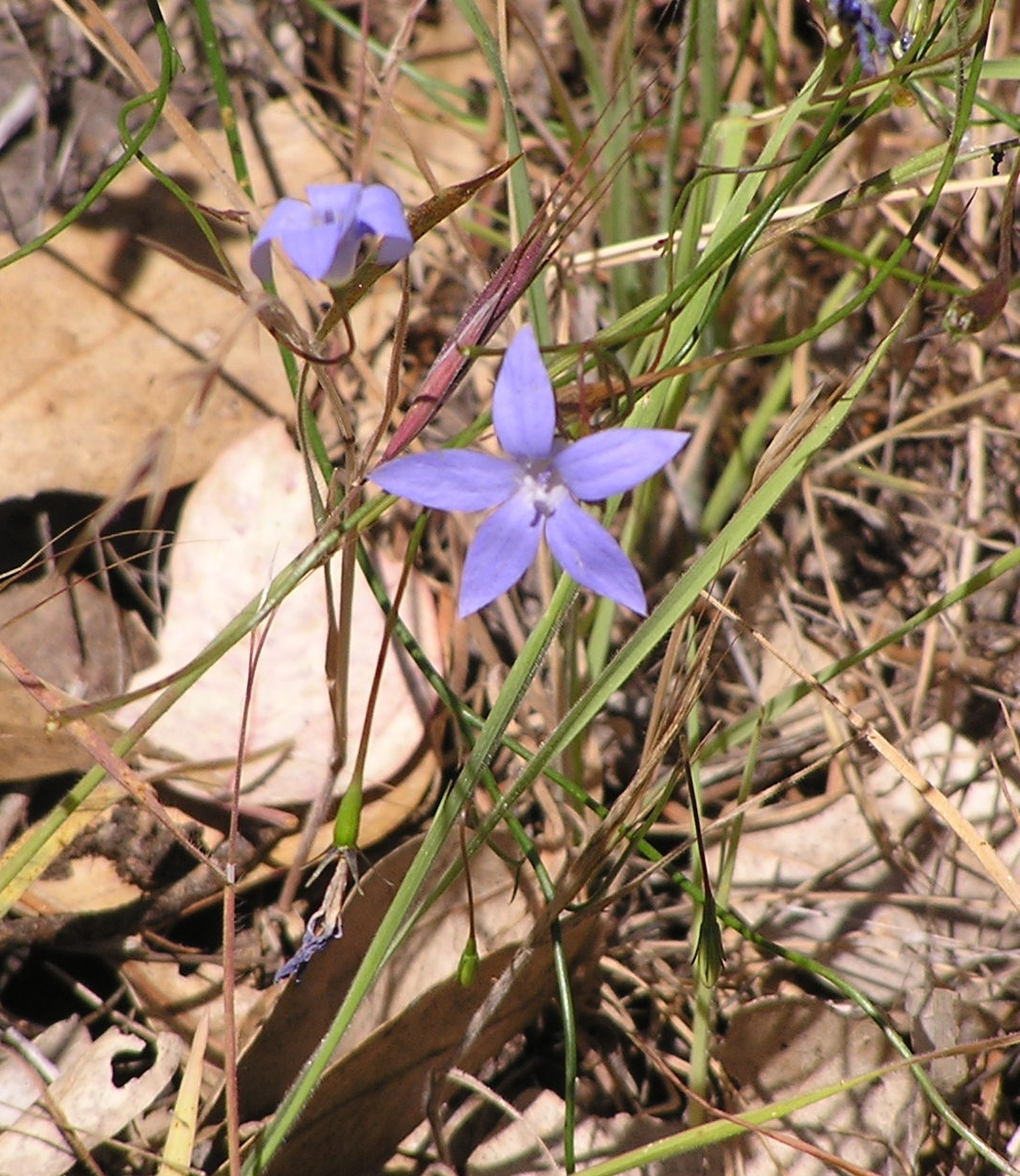
- Wahlenbergia stricta

Scientific classification
- Kingdom: Plantae
- Clade: Tracheophytes
- Clade: Angiosperms
- Clade: Eudicots
- Clade: Asterids
- Order: Asterales
- Family: Campanulaceae
- Subfamily: Campanuloideae
- Genus: Wahlenbergia; Schrad. ex Roth (1821), nom. cons.

Species
- 263; see List of Wahlenbergia species

Synonyms
- Aikinia (A.DC.) Salisb. ex Fourr. (1869), nom. illeg.; Campanopsis (R.Br.) Kuntze (1891); Campanuloides A.DC. (1830); Campanulopsis Zoll. & Moritzi (1844); Cephalostigma A.DC. (1830); Cervicina Delile (1813), nom. rej.; Hecale Raf. (1837); Hesperocodon Eddie & Cupido (2014); Ireon Scop. (1777), nom. illeg.; Lightfootia L'Hér. (1790), nom. illeg.; Petalostima Raf. (1837); Schultesia Roth (1827), nom. illeg.; Streleskia Hook.f. (1847); Valvinterlobus Dulac (1867), nom. superfl.

= Wahlenbergia =

Genus of flowering plants

Wahlenbergia is a genus of around 260 species of flowering plants in the family Campanulaceae. Plants in this genus are perennial or annual herbs with simple leaves and blue to purple bell-shaped flowers, usually with five petals lobes. Species of Wahlenbergia are native to environments on all continents except North America, and on some isolated islands, but the greatest diversity occurs in the Southern Hemisphere.

== Description ==
Plants in the genus Wahlenbergia are annual or perennial herbs, rarely shrubs, and sometimes have rhizomes. The stems are erect, circular in cross section and have simple leaves. The leaves decrease in size up the stem and usually have small scattered teeth on their edges. The flowers are borne on the end of the stems, either singly or arranged in a cyme. There are five sepals that remain until the fruiting stage. The petals are blue to purple and are joined at their base to form a bell-shaped or funnel-shaped tube with five lobes. There are usually five stamens, the style is often branched at the tip and the fruit is a capsule containing up to fifty seeds.

== Taxonomy and naming ==
In 1814, Heinrich Schrader used the name Wahlenbergia elongata but the name was a nomen nudum. The genus was first formally described in 1821 by Albrecht Wilhelm Roth and the description was published in Roth's book Novae Plantarum Species praesertim Indiae Orientalis. Roth retained Schrader's name Wahlenbergia. The name honours Göran Wahlenberg (a Swedish botanist who taught at Uppsala University).

== Distribution ==
The genus is widespread and species of Wahlenbergia are native to all continents except North America. The highest species diversity is in southern temperate countries, particularly Africa and Australasia and species are even found on oceanic islands. Four species are known from the island of Saint Helena, including the now extinct species W. roxburghii.

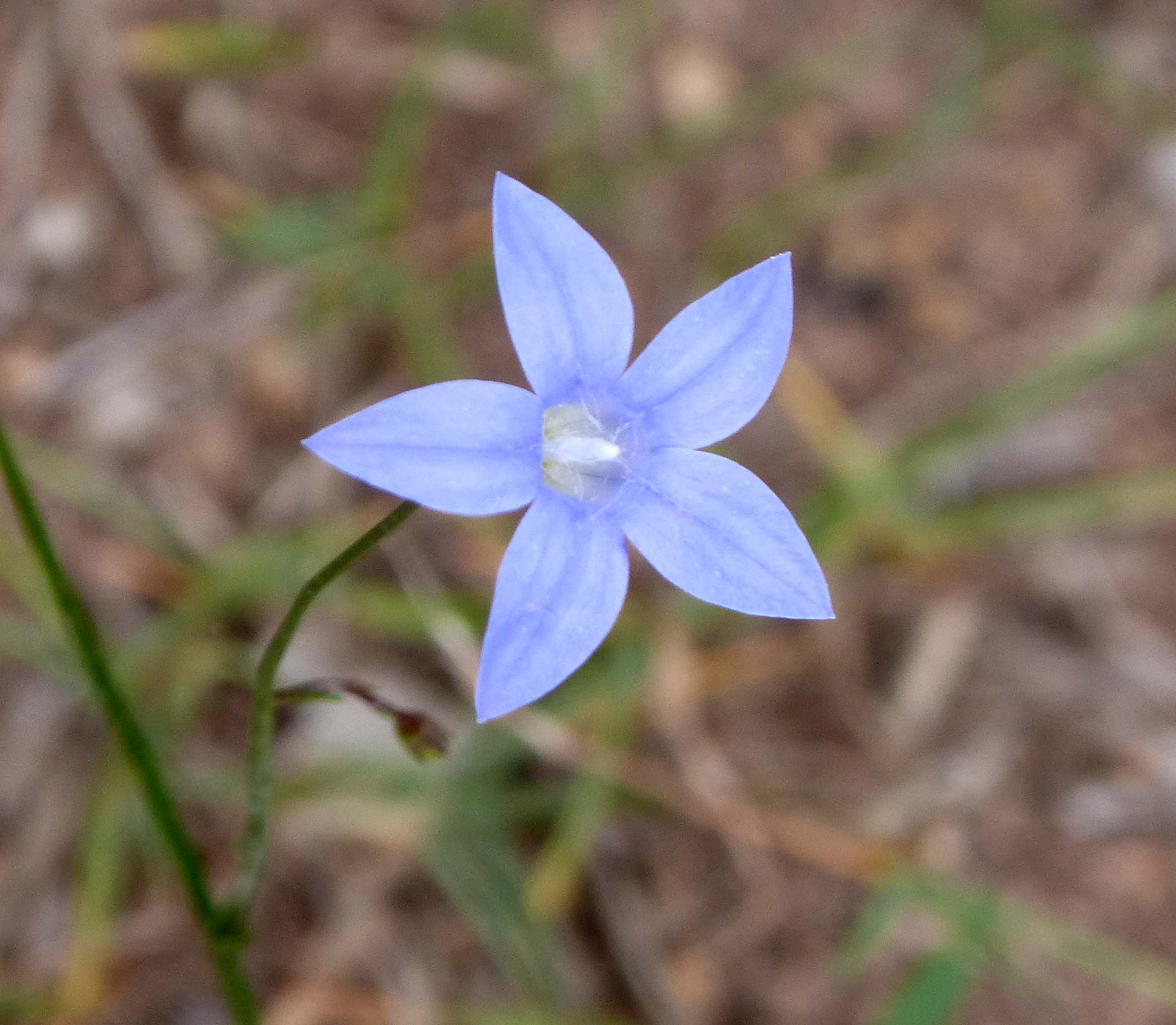
Wahlenbergia stricta

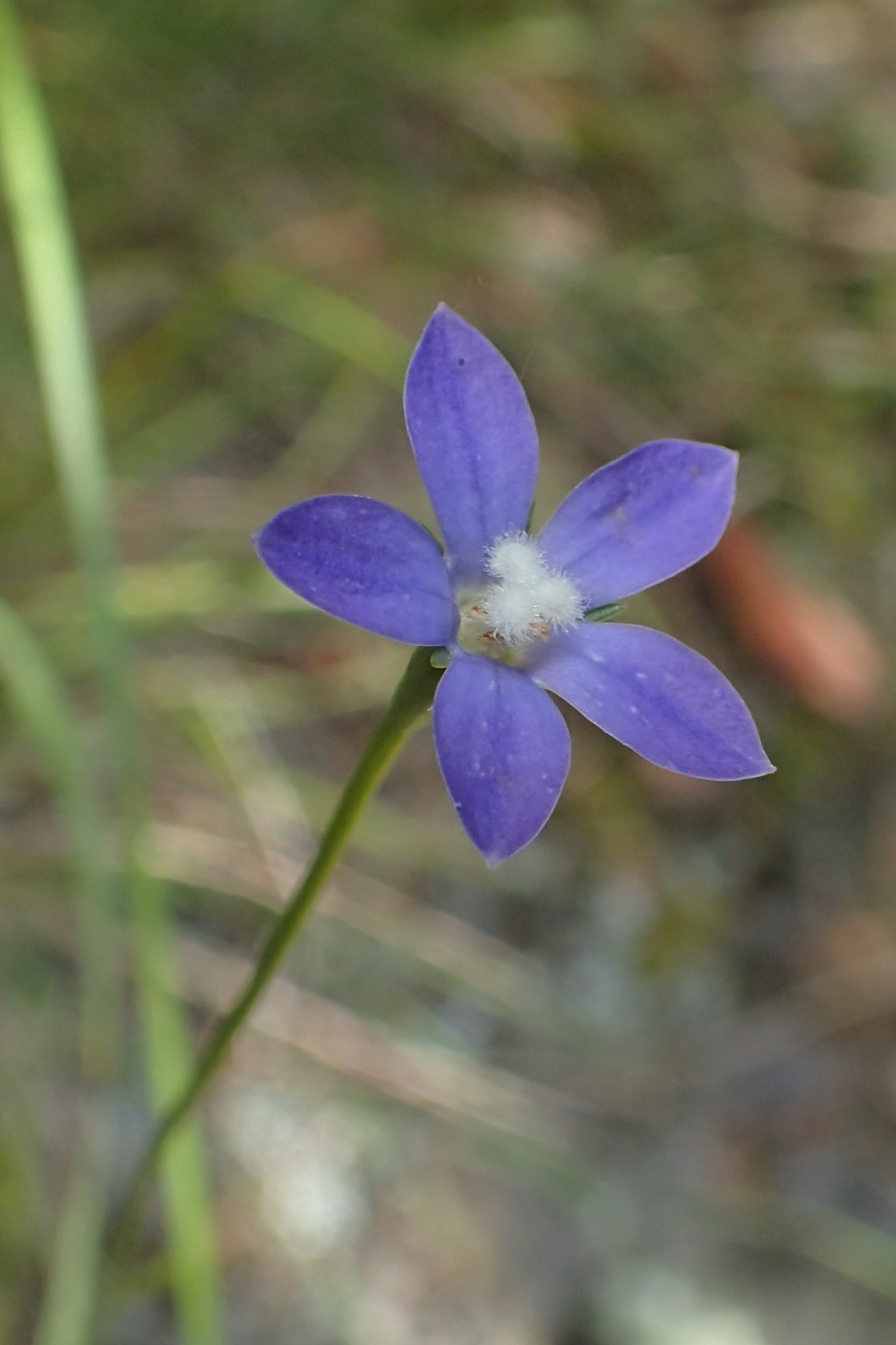
Wahlenbergia violacea

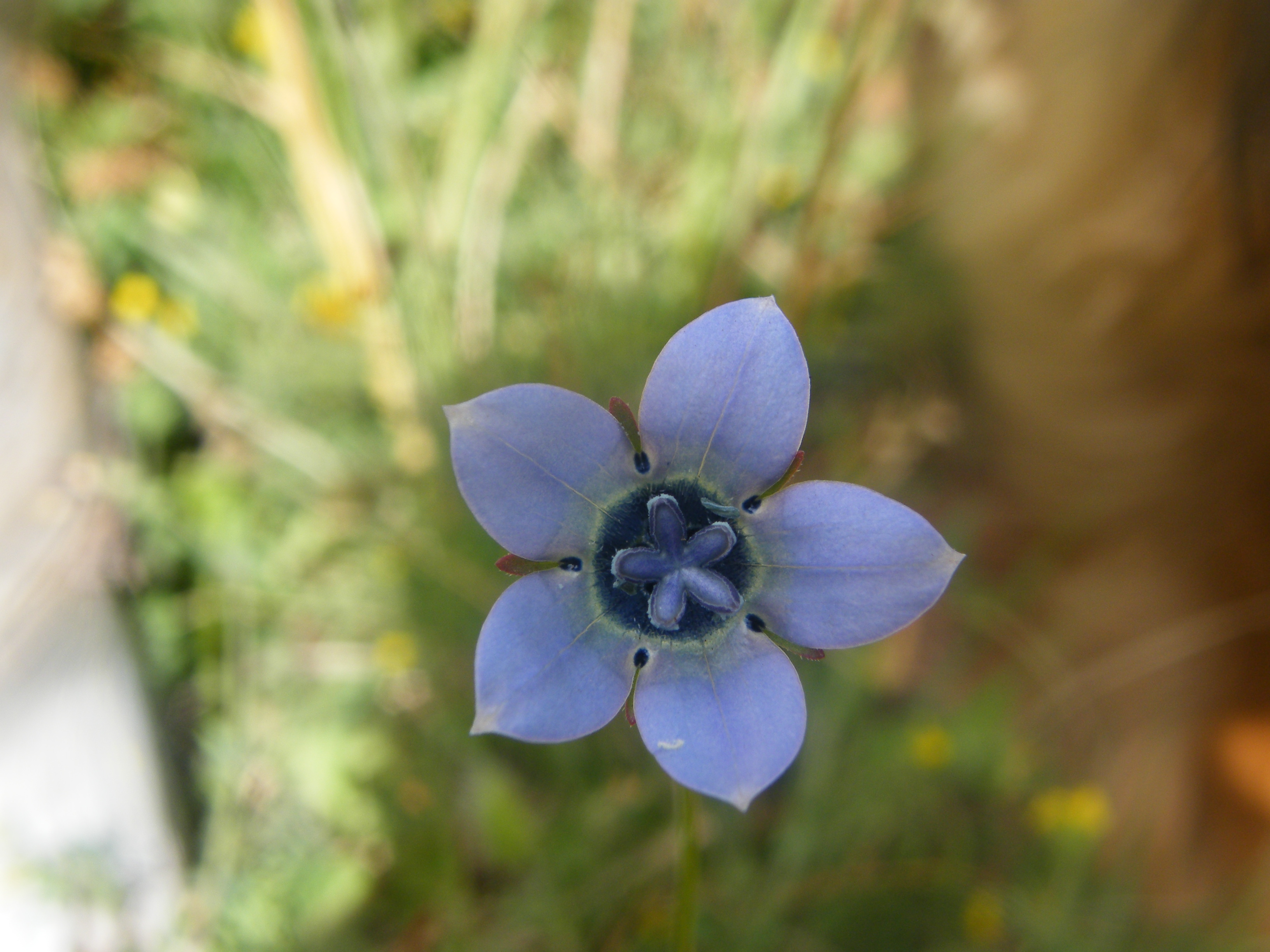
Wahlenbergia capensis

== See also ==
- List of Wahlenbergia species
