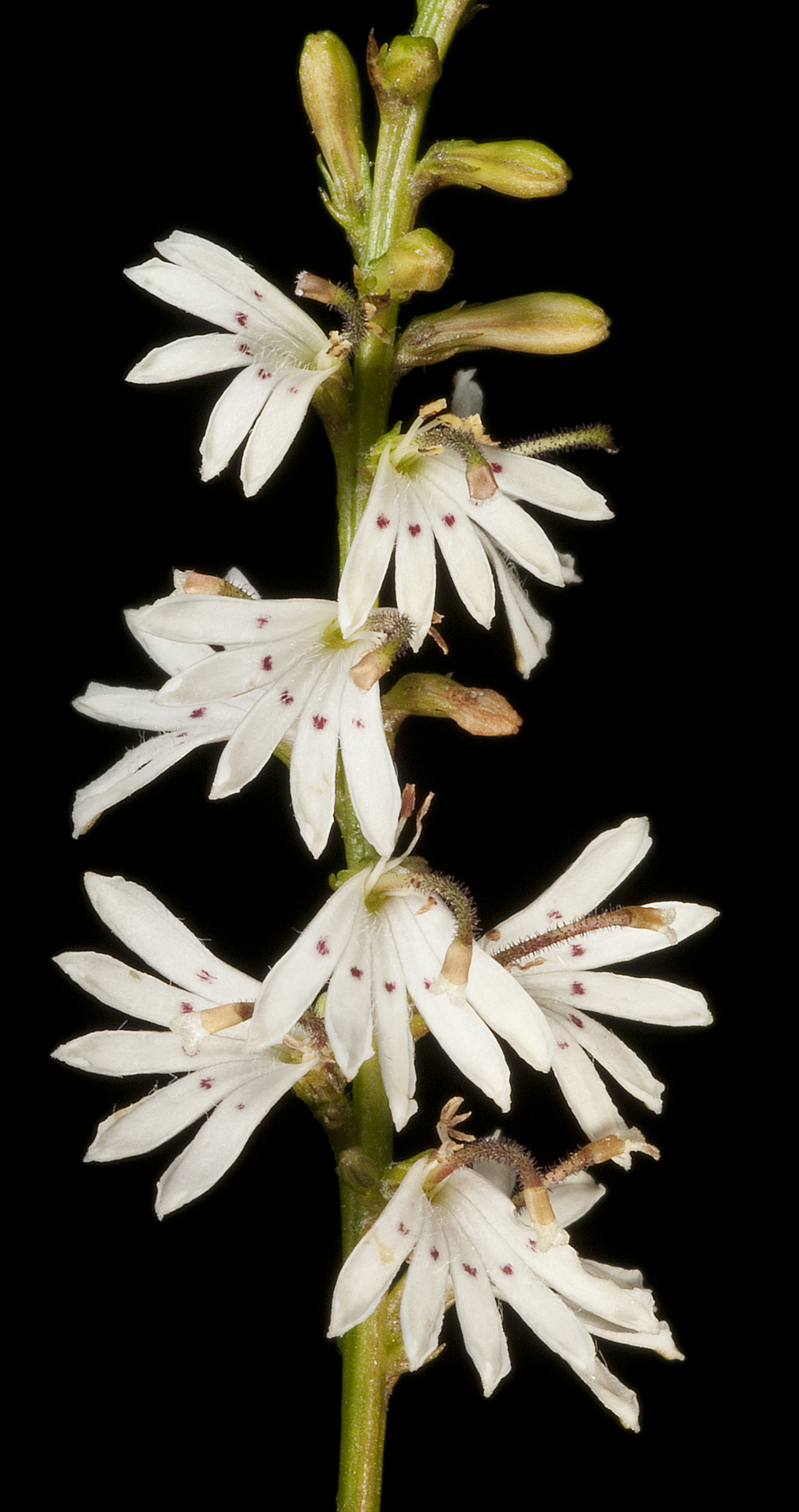

Scientific classification
- Kingdom: Plantae
- Clade: Tracheophytes
- Clade: Angiosperms
- Clade: Eudicots
- Clade: Asterids
- Order: Asterales
- Family: Goodeniaceae
- Genus: Goodenia
- Species: G. helmsii

Binomial name
- Goodenia helmsii (E.Pritz.) Carolin

Synonyms
- Scaevola helmsii E.Pritz.

= Goodenia helmsii =

Species of plant

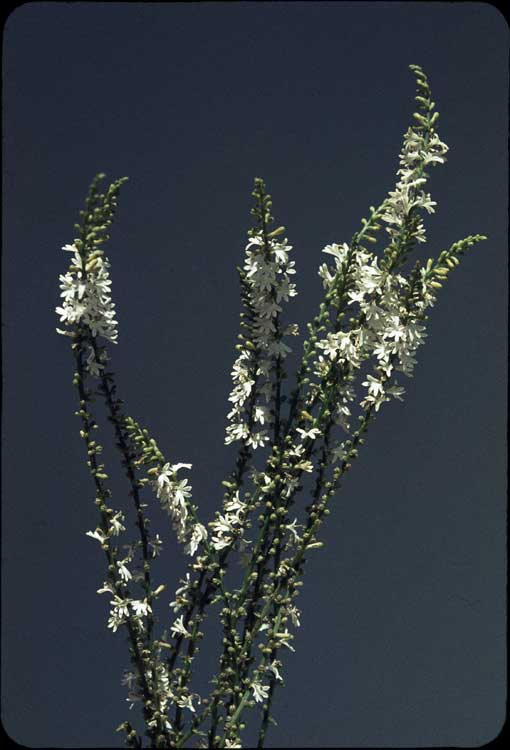
Habit near Wubin

Goodenia helmsii is a species of flowering plant in the family Goodeniaceae and is endemic to inland parts of the south-west of Western Australia. It is an erect or ascending shrub with cylindrical stem leaves and spikes of white flowers with purplish spots.

== Description ==
Goodenia helmsii is an erect or ascending shrub that typically grows to a height of 80 cm (31 in) tall and glabrous except for woolly hairs in the leaf axils. The leaves are linear, cylindrical 2–5 mm (0.079–0.197 in) long and about 0.5 mm (0.020 in) wide. The flowers are arranged in a spike or spike-like thyrse up to 120 mm (4.7 in) long with small bracts and bracteoles. The sepals are triangular, 0.5–0.7 mm (0.020–0.028 in) long, the corolla white with purplish spots, 4–5.5 mm (0.16–0.22 in) long with more or less equal lobes 1.5–2.5 mm (0.059–0.098 in) long with wings about 0.3 mm (0.012 in) wide. Flowering mainly occurs from July to December and the fruit is a more or less spherical nut about 1 mm (0.039 in) in diameter.

== Taxonomy and naming ==
This species was first formally described in 1905 by Ernst Georg Pritzel who gave it the name Scaevola helmsii. In 1990 Roger Charles Carolin changed the name to Goodenia helmsii in the journal Telopea. The specific epithet (helmsii) honours the naturalist Richard Helms.

== Distribution and habitat ==
This goodenia grows in gravelly or sandy soil in inland areas of the south-west, in the Avon Wheatbelt, Coolgardie, Jarrah Forest, Mallee, Murchison and Yalgoo biogeographic regions of Western Australia.

== Conservation status ==
Goodenia helmsii is classified as "not threatened" by the Government of Western Australia Department of Parks and Wildlife.
