= Goodenia brunnea =

Scientific classification
- Kingdom: Plantae
- Clade: Tracheophytes
- Clade: Angiosperms
- Clade: Eudicots
- Clade: Asterids
- Order: Asterales
- Family: Goodeniaceae
- Genus: Goodenia
- Species: G. brunnea

Binomial name
- Goodenia brunnea Carolin

Species of plant

Goodenia brunnea is a species of flowering plant in the family Goodeniaceae and is endemic to Central Australia. It is a shrub with sticky lance-shaped or lyre-shaped leaves with toothed edges, and racemes or thyrses of yellow flowers.

== Description ==
Goodenia brunnea is an erect to ascending shrub that typically grows to a height of 0.8 m (2 ft 7 in) with sticky foliage covered with glandular hairs. The leaves are lance-shaped or lyre-shaped, 30–60 mm (1.2–2.4 in) long and 10–20 mm (0.39–0.79 in) wide on a petiole up to 30 mm (1.2 in) long. The flowers are arranged in racemes or thyrses up to 250 mm (9.8 in) long, each flower on a pedicel 5–10 mm (0.20–0.39 in) long with a lance-shaped bracteoles 2–3 mm (0.079–0.118 in) long at the base. The sepals are lance-shaped, 4–5 mm (0.16–0.20 in) long, the petals yellow, up to 20 mm (0.79 in) long. The lower lobes of the corolla are about 9 mm (0.35 in) long with wings about 2.5 mm (0.098 in) wide and toothed. Flowering mainly occurs from June to November and the fruit is an oval capsule about 10 mm (0.39 in) long with toothed edges.

== Taxonomy and naming ==
Goodenia brunnea was first formally described in 1992 by Roger Charles Carolin in the Flora of Australia from material collected in 1957.

== Distribution and habitat ==
This goodenia grows in rocky situations and near watercourses in the far north-west of South Australia and the far south-west of the Northern Territory.
