= Goodenia viscidula =

Scientific classification
- Kingdom: Plantae
- Clade: Tracheophytes
- Clade: Angiosperms
- Clade: Eudicots
- Clade: Asterids
- Order: Asterales
- Family: Goodeniaceae
- Genus: Goodenia
- Species: G. viscidula

Binomial name
- Goodenia viscidula Carolin

Species of plant

Goodenia viscidula is a species of flowering plant in the family Goodeniaceae and is endemic to northern Australia. It is an erect annual herb with sticky, hairy foliage, egg-shaped to lance-shaped leaves with the narrower end towards the base, and thyrses or panicles of purplish-blue flowers.

== Description ==
Goodenia viscidula is an erect annual herb that typically grows to a height of up to 25 cm (9.8 in), is covered with sticky, hairy foliage and has adventitious roots. The leaves at the base of the plant are egg-shaped to lance-shaped with the narrower end towards the base, 40–110 mm (1.6–4.3 in) long and 10–20 mm (0.39–0.79 in) wide, sometimes with inconspicuously toothed edges. The flowers are arranged in loose thyrses or panicles up to 200 mm (7.9 in) long on a peduncle up to 15 mm (0.59 in) long, with linear bracts, each flower on a pedicel 9–11 mm (0.35–0.43 in) long. The sepals are lance-shaped, about 1 mm (0.039 in) long and the petals are purplish-blue and 5–7 mm (0.20–0.28 in) long. The lower lobes of the corolla are about 2 mm (0.079 in) long with wings about 1 mm (0.039 in) wide. Flowering occurs from March to May.

== Taxonomy and naming ==
Goodenia viscidula was first formally described in 1980 by Roger Charles Carolin in the journal Telopea from a specimen he collected near Borroloola in 1974. The specific epithet (viscidula) means "somewhat sticky".

== Distribution ==
This goodenia grows in seasonally damp place in northern parts of the Northern Territory and near the Gulf of Carpentaria in Queensland.

== Conservation status ==
Goodenia viscidula is classified as of "least concern" under the Northern Territory Government Territory Parks and Wildlife Conservation Act 1976 and the Queensland Government Nature Conservation Act 1992.
