= Goodenia phillipsiae =

Conservation status
- Priority Four — Rare Taxa (DEC)

Scientific classification
- Kingdom: Plantae
- Clade: Tracheophytes
- Clade: Angiosperms
- Clade: Eudicots
- Clade: Asterids
- Order: Asterales
- Family: Goodeniaceae
- Genus: Goodenia
- Species: G. phillipsiae

Binomial name
- Goodenia phillipsiae Carolin

Species of plant

Goodenia phillipsiae is a species of flowering plant in the family Goodeniaceae and is endemic to a restricted area in the south-west of Western Australia. It is an erect to spreading, glabrous shrub with oblong to linear stem leaves and thyrses of yellow flowers.

== Description ==
Goodenia phillipsiae is an erect to spreading suffruticose, glabrous shrub that typically grows to a height of 30 cm (12 in). It has thick, oblong to linear leaves on the stems, up to 40 mm (1.6 in) long and 3 mm (0.12 in) wide. The flowers are arranged in thyrses up to about 200 mm (7.9 in) long, with leaf-like bracts, each flower on a pedicel 15–30 mm (0.59–1.18 in) long. The sepals are elliptic to lance-shaped, about 2 mm (0.079 in) long, the petals yellow, 10–12 mm (0.39–0.47 in) long and densely bearded at the base. The lower lobes of the corolla are about 6 mm (0.24 in) long with wings up to 1.5 mm (0.059 in) wide. Flowering occurs around November.

== Taxonomy and naming ==
Goodenia phillipsiae was first formally described in 1990 Roger Charles Carolin in the journal Telopea from a specimen collected by Mary E. Phillips 19 mi (31 km) east of Ravensthorpe in 1962. The specific epithet (phillipsiae) honours the collector of the type specimens.

== Distribution ==
This goodenia is only known from the type location.

== Conservation status ==
Goodenia phillipsiae is classified as "Priority Four" by the Government of Western Australia Department of Parks and Wildlife, meaning that is rare or near threatened.
