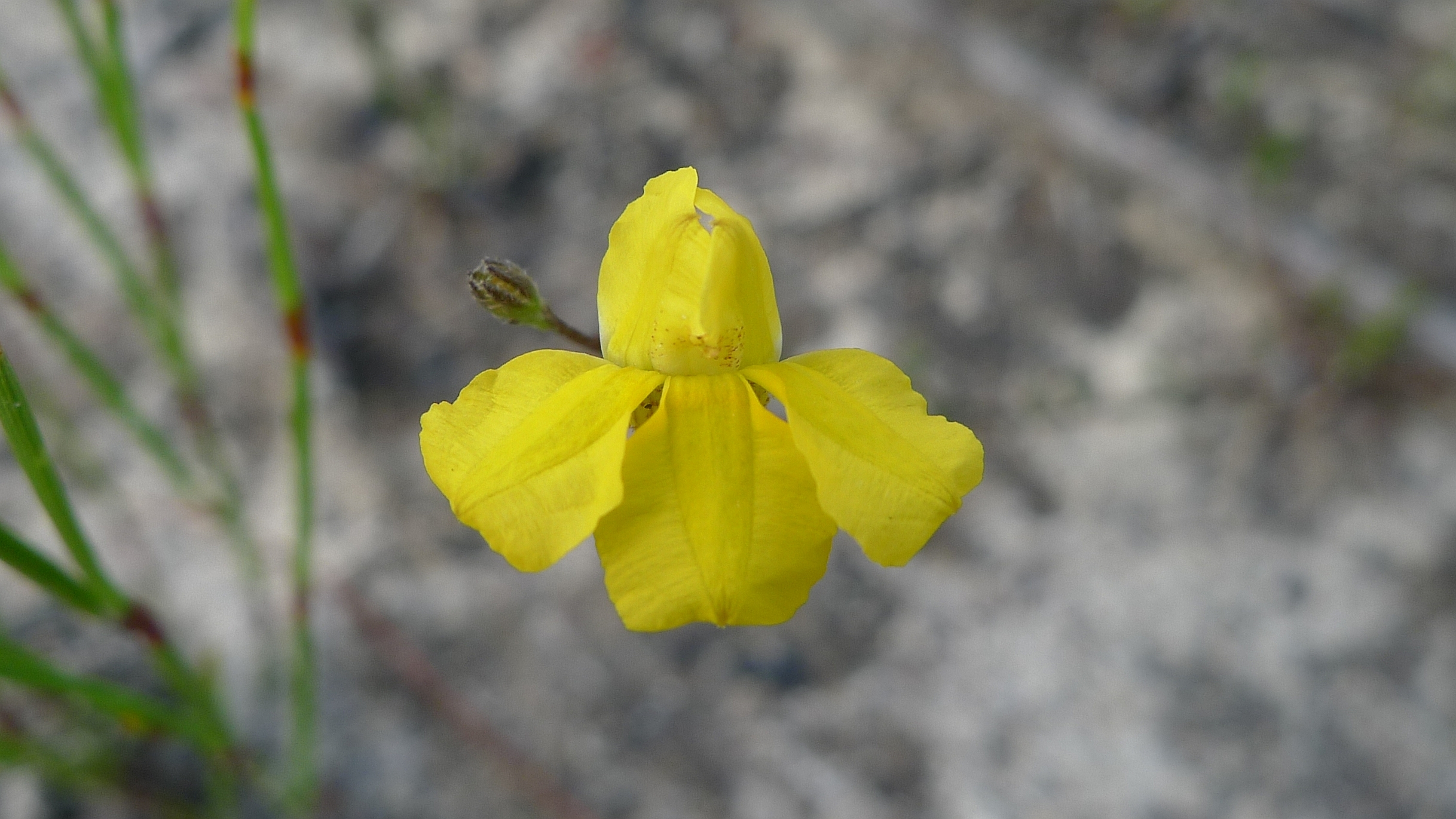
- In the Royal National Park

Scientific classification
- Kingdom: Plantae
- Clade: Tracheophytes
- Clade: Angiosperms
- Clade: Eudicots
- Clade: Asterids
- Order: Asterales
- Family: Goodeniaceae
- Genus: Goodenia
- Species: G. dimorpha

Binomial name
- Goodenia dimorpha Maiden & Betche

= Goodenia dimorpha =

Species of flowering plant

Goodenia dimorpha is a species of flowering plant in the family Goodeniaceae and is endemic to the Sydney region. It is an erect herb with adventitious roots, linear to egg-shaped leaves, mostly at the base of the plant, and panicles of yellow flowers.

== Description ==
Goodenis dimorpha is an erect, glabrous herb that typically grows to a height of 50 cm (20 in) and has adventitious roots. The leaves are mostly at the base of the plant, linear to egg-shaped with the narrower end towards the base, 10–50 mm (0.39–1.97 in) long and 2–11 mm (0.079–0.433 in) wide, sometimes with a few small teeth on the edges. The flowers are arranged in thyrse-like panicles up to 400 mm (16 in) long on a peduncle up to 140 mm (5.5 in) long with linear bracts at the base, each flower on a pedicel about 3 mm (0.12 in) long. The sepals are 2–6 mm (0.079–0.236 in) long, the corolla yellow, 12–15 mm (0.47–0.59 in) long. The lower lobes of the corolla are about 6 mm (0.24 in) long with wings about 3 mm (0.12 in) wide. The fruit is a narrow cylindrical to oval capsule 8–10 mm (0.31–0.39 in) long.

== Taxonomy ==
Goodenia dimorpha was first formally described in 1904 by Joseph Maiden and Ernst Betche in the Proceedings of the Linnean Society of New South Wales. In 1990, Roger Charles Carolin selected the lectotype as material collected by Betche near Woodford in 1899.

In the same journal, Maiden and Betche described two varieties, and the names are accepted by the Australian Plant Census:

- Goodenia dimorpha var. angustifolia Maiden & Betche has linear leaves and mainly flowers from November to June;
- Goodenia dimorpha Maiden & Betche var. dimorpha has egg-shaped leaves with the narrower end towards the base and mostly flowers from October to March.

== Distribution and habitat ==
This goodenia in swampy ground on sandstone plateaus. Variety angustifolia occurs from the Gosford district to Waterfall and var. dimorpha mainly near Blackheath in the Blue Mountains.
