= Goodenia viridula =

Scientific classification
- Kingdom: Plantae
- Clade: Embryophytes
- Clade: Tracheophytes
- Clade: Spermatophytes
- Clade: Angiosperms
- Clade: Eudicots
- Clade: Asterids
- Order: Asterales
- Family: Goodeniaceae
- Genus: Goodenia
- Species: G. viridula

Binomial name
- Goodenia viridula Carolin

Species of plant

Goodenia viridula is a species of flowering plant in the family Goodeniaceae and is endemic to a restricted area of Queensland. It is an erect undershrub with linear leaves and spikes of greenish-yellow flowers.

== Description ==
Goodenia viridula is an erect undershrub that typically grows to a height of up to 40 cm (16 in) and has many branches, the foliage covered with cottony hairs when young. The leaves are linear, 15–50 mm (0.59–1.97 in) long and 0.5–1.1 mm (0.020–0.043 in) wide with the edges rolled under. The flowers are arranged in spikes up to 100 mm (3.9 in) long and have leaf-like bracts and bracteoles 1–2 mm (0.039–0.079 in) long. The flowers are sessile with egg-shaped sepals 0.8–1 mm (0.031–0.039 in) long. The petals are greenish-yellow and 4–9 mm (0.16–0.35 in) long, the lower lobes of the corolla 2–4 mm (0.079–0.157 in) long with wings about 0.5 mm (0.020 in) wide. Flowering occurs from November to May.

== Taxonomy and naming ==
Goodenia viridula was first formally described in 1990 by Roger Charles Carolin in the journal Telopea from a specimen collected by Lindsay Stuart Smith and Selwyn Lawrence Everist near Jericho in 1940. The specific epithet (viridula) means "greenish", referring to the colour of the corolla.

== Distribution ==
This goodenia grows in open woodland and heath and is only known from near Jericho in Queensland.

== Conservation status ==
Goodenia viridula is classified as of "least concern" under the Queensland Government Nature Conservation Act 1992.
