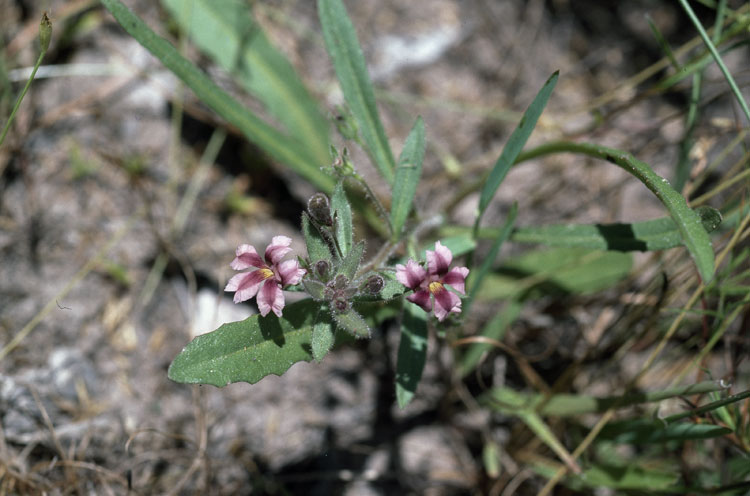
- Near Darwin

Scientific classification
- Kingdom: Plantae
- Clade: Tracheophytes
- Clade: Angiosperms
- Clade: Eudicots
- Clade: Asterids
- Order: Asterales
- Family: Goodeniaceae
- Genus: Goodenia
- Species: G. purpurea

Binomial name
- Goodenia purpurea (F.Muell.) Carolin

= Goodenia purpurea =

Species of plant

Goodenia purpurea is a species of flowering plant in the family Goodeniaceae and is endemic to the Northern Territory. It is an ascending herb with narrow oblong to lance-shaped leaves at the base of the plant, and racemes of purple flowers.

== Description ==
Goodenia purpurea is an ascending herb that typically grows to a height of 35 cm (14 in), its foliage covered with simple and glandular hairs. The leaves at the base of the plant are oblong to lance-shaped, 45–120 mm (1.8–4.7 in) long and 5–14 mm (0.20–0.55 in) wide, those on the stems smaller. The flowers are arranged in racemes up to 280 mm (11 in) long, with leaf-like bracts, each flower on a pedicel 10–20 mm (0.39–0.79 in) long. The sepals are oblong to elliptic, 2.5–3 mm (0.098–0.118 in) long, the petals purple and 8–12 mm (0.31–0.47 in) long. The lower lobes of the corolla 3–4 mm (0.12–0.16 in) long with wings about 1.5 mm (0.059 in) wide. Flowering mainly occurs from February to June and the fruit is a more or less spherical capsule 3–4 mm (0.12–0.16 in) in diameter.

== Taxonomy and naming ==
This species was first formally described in 1873 by Ferdinand von Mueller in his Fragmenta Phytographiae Australiae and was given the name Calogyne purpurea. In 1990, Roger Charles Carolin changed the name to Goodenia purpurea in the journal Telopea. The specific epithet (purpurea) means "purple".

== Distribution and habitat ==
This goodenia grows in forest and woodland in the Arnhem Land region of the Northern Territory.
