= Goodenia wilunensis =

Scientific classification
- Kingdom: Plantae
- Clade: Tracheophytes
- Clade: Angiosperms
- Clade: Eudicots
- Clade: Asterids
- Order: Asterales
- Family: Goodeniaceae
- Genus: Goodenia
- Species: G. wilunensis

Binomial name
- Goodenia wilunensis Carolin

Species of plant

Goodenia wilunensis is a species of flowering plant in the family Goodeniaceae and is endemic to central regions of Western Australia. It is an ascending to prostrate annual herb covered with silky hairs and has elliptic to egg-shaped leaves with the narrower end towards the base, and racemes of yellow flowers with purplish markings.

== Description ==
Goodenia wilunensis is an ascending to prostrate annual herb covered with silky hairs and that has stems of up to 30 cm (12 in) long. The leaves at the base of the plant are elliptic to egg-shaped with the narrower end towards the base, 40–60 mm (1.6–2.4 in) long and 8–15 mm (0.31–0.59 in) wide, sometimes with toothed edges. Leaves on the stems are smaller. The flowers are arranged in racemes up to 300 mm (12 in) long on a peduncle 30–60 mm (1.2–2.4 in) long with leaf-like bracts, each flower on a pedicel 10–25 mm (0.39–0.98 in) long. The sepals are narrow egg-shaped, about 6 mm (0.24 in) long and the petals are yellow with purplish marks and about 18 mm (0.71 in) long. The lower lobes of the corolla are 8–9 mm (0.31–0.35 in) long with wings about 4 mm (0.16 in) wide. Flowering occurs from July to October.

== Taxonomy and naming ==
Goodenia wilunensis was first formally described in 1980 by Roger Charles Carolin in the journal Telopea from a specimen collected by Charles Gardner near Wiluna in 1931. The specific epithet (wilunensis) refers to the town near where the type specimen was collected.

== Distribution ==
This goodenia grows in sandy soil, often in creek beds in the Gascoyne, Little Sandy Desert, Murchison and Pilbara biogeographic regions of central Western Australia.

== Conservation status ==
Goodenia wilunensis is classified as "not threatened" by the Government of Western Australia Department of Parks and Wildlife.
