= Goodenia janamba =

Conservation status
- Priority One — Poorly Known Taxa (DEC)

Scientific classification
- Kingdom: Plantae
- Clade: Tracheophytes
- Clade: Angiosperms
- Clade: Eudicots
- Clade: Asterids
- Order: Asterales
- Family: Goodeniaceae
- Genus: Goodenia
- Species: G. janamba

Binomial name
- Goodenia janamba Carolin

Species of plant

Goodenia janamba is a species of flowering plant in the family Goodeniaceae and is endemic to northern Australia. It is an erect herb with linear to lance-shaped leaves mostly at the base of the plant, and umbels or racemes of flowers that are yellow, or purplish with a yellow centre.

== Description ==
Goodenia janamba is an erect herb that typically grows to a height of about 60 cm (24 in). The leaves are linear to lance-shaped with the narrower end towards the base, mostly at the base of the plant, 20–160 mm (0.79–6.30 in) long and 1–17 mm (0.039–0.669 in) wide. The flowers are arranged in umbels or leafy racemes up to 150 mm (5.9 in) long with linear bracts 4–7 mm (0.16–0.28 in) long, each flower on a pedicel 20–50 mm (0.79–1.97 in) long. The sepals are triangular, about 0.5 mm (0.020 in) long, the corolla yellow or purplish with a yellow centre, 10–15 mm (0.39–0.59 in) long. The lower lobes of the corolla are 3–6 mm (0.12–0.24 in) long with wings about 1 mm (0.039 in) wide. Flowering mainly occurs from April to July and the fruit is more or less spherical capsule about 4 mm (0.16 in) in diameter.

== Taxonomy and naming ==
Goodenia janamba was first formally described in 1990 by Roger Charles Carolin in the journal Telopea from material he collected in 1968 near the South Alligator River on the road to Gunbalanya. The specific epithet (janamba) is an Aboriginal word meaning "crocodile", referring to the type location.

== Distribution and habitat ==
This goodenia grows in open woodland in the northern Kimberley region of Western Australia, in Arnhem Land and in nearby parts of Queensland.

== Conservation status ==
Goodenia janambais classified as "Priority One" by the Government of Western Australia Department of Parks and Wildlife, meaning that it is known from only one or a few locations which are potentially at risk, but as of "least concern" under the Queensland Government Nature Conservation Act 1992 and the Northern Territory Government Territory Parks and Wildlife Conservation Act 1976.
