= Goodenia pallida =

Conservation status
- Priority One — Poorly Known Taxa (DEC)

Scientific classification
- Kingdom: Plantae
- Clade: Tracheophytes
- Clade: Angiosperms
- Clade: Eudicots
- Clade: Asterids
- Order: Asterales
- Family: Goodeniaceae
- Genus: Goodenia
- Species: G. pallida

Binomial name
- Goodenia pallida Carolin

Species of plant

Goodenia pallida is a species of flowering plant in the family Goodeniaceae and is endemic to a restricted area in the extreme west of Western Australia. It is an erect herb covered with simple and glandular hairs, and with narrow elliptic stem leaves and racemes of pale purple flowers.

== Description ==
Goodenia pallida is an erect herb that typically grows to a height of 50 cm (20 in) and is covered with both simple and brown-tipped glandular hairs. It has narrow elliptic leaves on the stems, 50–70 mm (2.0–2.8 in) long and 3–8 mm (0.12–0.31 in) wide, sometimes with teeth on the edges. The flowers are arranged in racemes up to about 150 mm (5.9 in) long, with leaf-like bracts, each flower on a pedicel 30–40 mm (1.2–1.6 in) long. The sepals are linear, 1.5–2 mm (0.059–0.079 in) long, the petals pale purple, 14–16 mm (0.55–0.63 in) long. The lower lobes of the corolla are 6–7 mm (0.24–0.28 in) long with wings about 2 mm (0.079 in) wide. Flowering occurs around August and the fruit is a more or less spherical capsule 6–7 mm (0.24–0.28 in) in diameter.

== Taxonomy and naming ==
Goodenia pallida was first formally described in 1990 Roger Charles Carolin in the journal Telopea from a specimen he collected on the road between Onslow and Roeburne in 1970. The specific epithet (pallida) means "pale", referring to the colour of the petals.

== Distribution and habitat ==
This goodenia grows in grassy woodland and is only known from the type location.

== Conservation status ==
Goodenia pallida is classified as "Priority One" by the Government of Western Australia Department of Parks and Wildlife, meaning that it is known from only one or a few locations which are potentially at risk.
