= Goodenia ochracea =

Scientific classification
- Kingdom: Plantae
- Clade: Tracheophytes
- Clade: Angiosperms
- Clade: Eudicots
- Clade: Asterids
- Order: Asterales
- Family: Goodeniaceae
- Genus: Goodenia
- Species: G. ochracea

Binomial name
- Goodenia ochracea Carolin

Species of plant

Goodenia ochracea is a species of flowering plant in the family Goodeniaceae and is endemic to the extreme west of Western Australia. It is a low-lying, stolon-forming herb with clusters of lance-shaped, toothed leaves at the base of the plant, and racemes of deep yellow flowers.

== Description ==
Goodenia ochracea is a low-lying herb with stolon-forming stems up to 15 cm (5.9 in) long. It has lance-shaped leaves with the narrower end towards the base, at the base of the plant, 30–60 mm (1.2–2.4 in) long and 4–8 mm (0.16–0.31 in) wide with teeth on the edges. The flowers are arranged in racemes up to 80 mm (3.1 in) long, with leaf-like bracts, each flower on a pedicel 8–15 mm (0.31–0.59 in) long. The sepals are narrow oblong, 4–5 mm (0.16–0.20 in) long, the petals deep yellow, 15–16 mm (0.59–0.63 in) long. The lower lobes of the corolla are 8–9 mm (0.31–0.35 in) long with wings about 2 mm (0.079 in) wide. Flowering occurs from June to October and the fruit is a more or less spherical capsule about 6 mm (0.24 in) in diameter.

== Taxonomy and naming ==
Goodenia ochracea was first formally described in 1990 Roger Charles Carolin in the journal Telopea from a specimen collected by Charles Gardner near Shark Bay in 1932. The specific epithet (ochracea) means "ochre-yellow", referring to the colour of the petals.

== Distribution and habitat ==
This goodenia grows in sandy soil in the Carnarvon-Shark Bay area in the extreme west of Western Australia.

== Conservation status ==
Goodenia ochracea is classified as "not threatened" by the Government of Western Australia Department of Parks and Wildlife.
