= Goodenia stellata =

Scientific classification
- Kingdom: Plantae
- Clade: Tracheophytes
- Clade: Angiosperms
- Clade: Eudicots
- Clade: Asterids
- Order: Asterales
- Family: Goodeniaceae
- Genus: Goodenia
- Species: G. stellata

Binomial name
- Goodenia stellata Carolin

Species of plant

Goodenia stellata is a species of flowering plant in the family Goodeniaceae and is endemic to inland areas of Western Australia. It is a low-lying to prostrate herb with elliptic to egg-shaped leaves with wavy edges, and racemes of yellow flowers.

== Description ==
Goodenia stellata is a low-lying to prostrate herb with stems up to 20 cm (7.9 in) long, the foliage covered with star-shaped hairs. The leaves at the base of the plant are oblong to egg-shaped, 40–80 mm (1.6–3.1 in) long and 15–25 mm (0.59–0.98 in) wide with wavy edges. The flowers are arranged in racemes up to 50 mm (2.0 in) long with leaf-like bracts, each flower on a pedicel 10–20 mm (0.39–0.79 in) long. The sepals are lance-shaped to narrow oblong, about 4 mm (0.16 in) long, the petals yellow, 12–15 mm (0.47–0.59 in) long. The lower lobes of the corolla are 5–6 mm (0.20–0.24 in) long with wings about 1 mm (0.039 in) wide. Flowering occurs from July to October and the fruit is a more or less spherical capsule 6–7 mm (0.24–0.28 in) in diameter.

== Taxonomy and naming ==
Goodenia stellata was first formally described in 1980 by Roger Charles Carolin in the journal Telopea from material he collected 117 km (73 mi) from Tom Price in 1970. The specific epithet (stellata) refers to the star-shaped hairs on the foliage.

== Distribution and habitat ==
This goodenia grows in stony soil in the Pilbara and Gibson Desert regions of inland Western Australia.

== Conservation status ==
Goodenia stellata is classified as "not threatened" by the Government of Western Australia Department of Parks and Wildlife.
