= Goodenia muelleriana =

Scientific classification
- Kingdom: Plantae
- Clade: Tracheophytes
- Clade: Angiosperms
- Clade: Eudicots
- Clade: Asterids
- Order: Asterales
- Family: Goodeniaceae
- Genus: Goodenia
- Species: G. muelleriana

Binomial name
- Goodenia muelleriana Carolin

Species of plant

Goodenia muelleriana is a species of flowering plant in the family Goodeniaceae and is endemic to the north-west of Western Australia. It is an ascending to erect herb with elliptic to lance-shaped leaves at the base of the plant, and racemes of yellow flowers.

== Description ==
Goodenia muelleriana is an ascending to erect herb that typically grows to a height of up to 40 cm (16 in). It has elliptic to lance-shaped leaves with the narrower end towards the base, at the base of the plant, 30–60 mm (1.2–2.4 in) long and 8–20 mm (0.31–0.79 in) wide, sometimes with teeth on the edges. The flowers are arranged in racemes up to 200 mm (7.9 in) long, with leaf-like bracts, each flower on a pedicel 20–35 mm (0.79–1.38 in) long. The sepals are lance-shaped, about 2 mm (0.079 in) long, the petals yellow, 12–15 mm (0.47–0.59 in) long. The lower lobes of the corolla are about 3.5–4 mm (0.14–0.16 in) long with wings 2.5–3 mm (0.098–0.118 in) wide. Flowering mainly occurs from May to September and the fruit is a more or less spherical capsule about 6 mm (0.24 in) in diameter.

== Taxonomy and naming ==
Goodenia muelleriana was first formally described in 1990 Roger Charles Carolin in the journal Telopea from a specimen he collected near Tom Price in 1970. The specific epithet (muelleriana) honours Ferdinand von Mueller.

== Distribution and habitat ==
This goodenia grows in sandy or stony soil in the Gascoyne, Little Sandy Desert and Pilbara biogeographic regions in the north-west of Western Australia.

== Conservation status ==
Goodenia muelleriana is classified as "not threatened" by the Government of Western Australia Department of Parks and Wildlife.
