= Goodenia iyouta =

Scientific classification
- Kingdom: Plantae
- Clade: Tracheophytes
- Clade: Angiosperms
- Clade: Eudicots
- Clade: Asterids
- Order: Asterales
- Family: Goodeniaceae
- Genus: Goodenia
- Species: G. iyouta

Binomial name
- Goodenia iyouta Carolin

Species of plant

Goodenia iyouta is a species of flowering plant in the family Goodeniaceae and is endemic to Western Australia. It is a prostrate herb with toothed, egg-shaped to elliptic stem-leaves, and racemes of dark yellow or cream-coloured flowers with a distinct pouch.

== Description ==
Goodenia iyouta is a prostrate herb with stems up to 120 cm (47 in) long. The leaves are arranged on the stems, egg-shaped to elliptic 20–70 mm (0.79–2.76 in) long, 8–17 mm (0.31–0.67 in) wide and toothed to almost lobed. The flowers are arranged in racemes up to 200 mm (7.9 in) long with leaf-like bracts, each flower on a pedicel up to 40 mm (1.6 in) long. The sepals are narrow oblong, about 3.5 mm (0.14 in) long, the corolla dark yellow or cream-coloured with a distinct pouch, 11–15 mm (0.43–0.59 in) long. The lower lobes of the corolla are 4–5 mm (0.16–0.20 in) long with wings about 2.5 mm (0.098 in) wide. Flowering occurs from about June to September and the fruit is more or less spherical capsule about 5–6 mm (0.20–0.24 in) in diameter.

== Taxonomy and naming ==
Goodenia iyouta was first formally described in 1980 by Roger Charles Carolin in the journal Telopea from material collected in 1965. The specific epithet (iyouta) is an Aboriginal word for Triodia species, with which G. iyouta often grows.

== Distribution and habitat ==
This goodenia grows in red, sandy soil in the northern Gibson Desert and near Roebourne in Western Australia.

== Conservation status ==
Goodenia iyouta is classified as "not threatened" by the Department of Environment and Conservation (Western Australia).
