= Goodenia gloeophylla =

Conservation status
- Priority Two — Poorly Known Taxa (DEC)

Scientific classification
- Kingdom: Plantae
- Clade: Tracheophytes
- Clade: Angiosperms
- Clade: Eudicots
- Clade: Asterids
- Order: Asterales
- Family: Goodeniaceae
- Genus: Goodenia
- Species: G. gloeophylla

Binomial name
- Goodenia gloeophylla Carolin

Species of plant

Goodenia gloeophylla is a species of flowering plant in the family Goodeniaceae and is endemic to northern Australia. It is an erect, slightly woody under-shrub with linear to narrow elliptic, toothed or narrowly lobed leaves, and racemes of pale to deep purple flowers.

== Description ==
Goodenia gloeophylla is an erect, slightly woody under-shrub that typically grows to a height of 50 cm (20 in) and is slightly sticky. The stem leaves are linear to narrow elliptic, 40–80 mm (1.6–3.1 in) long, 1–2.5 mm (0.039–0.098 in) wide and toothed or narrowly lobed. The flowers are arranged in racemes up to 350 mm (14 in) long on a peduncle up to 18 mm (0.71 in) long with leaf-like bracts at the base, each flower on a pedicel 2–4 mm (0.079–0.157 in) long with linear bracteoles 3–8 mm (0.12–0.31 in) long. The sepals are narrow triangular, 1–1.5 mm (0.039–0.059 in) long, the corolla pale to deep purple, 10–12 mm (0.39–0.47 in) long. The lower lobes of the corolla are 5–6 mm (0.20–0.24 in) long with wings about 1 mm (0.039 in) wide. Flowering mostly occurs from April to May and the fruit is a cylindrical capsule 8–10 mm (0.31–0.39 in) long.

== Taxonomy and naming ==
Goodenia gloeophylla was first formally described in 1990 by Roger Charles Carolin in the journal Telopea from material collected in 1971 by David Eric Symon near Kalumburu. The specific epithet (gloeophylla) means "sticky-leaved".

== Distribution and habitat ==
This goodenia grows in sandy soil in heath and scrub in the northern Kimberley region of Western Australia and in the northern part of the Northern Territory.

== Conservation status ==
Goodenia gloeophylla is classified as "Priority Two" by the Western Australian Government Department of Parks and Wildlife meaning that it is poorly known and from only one or a few locations.
