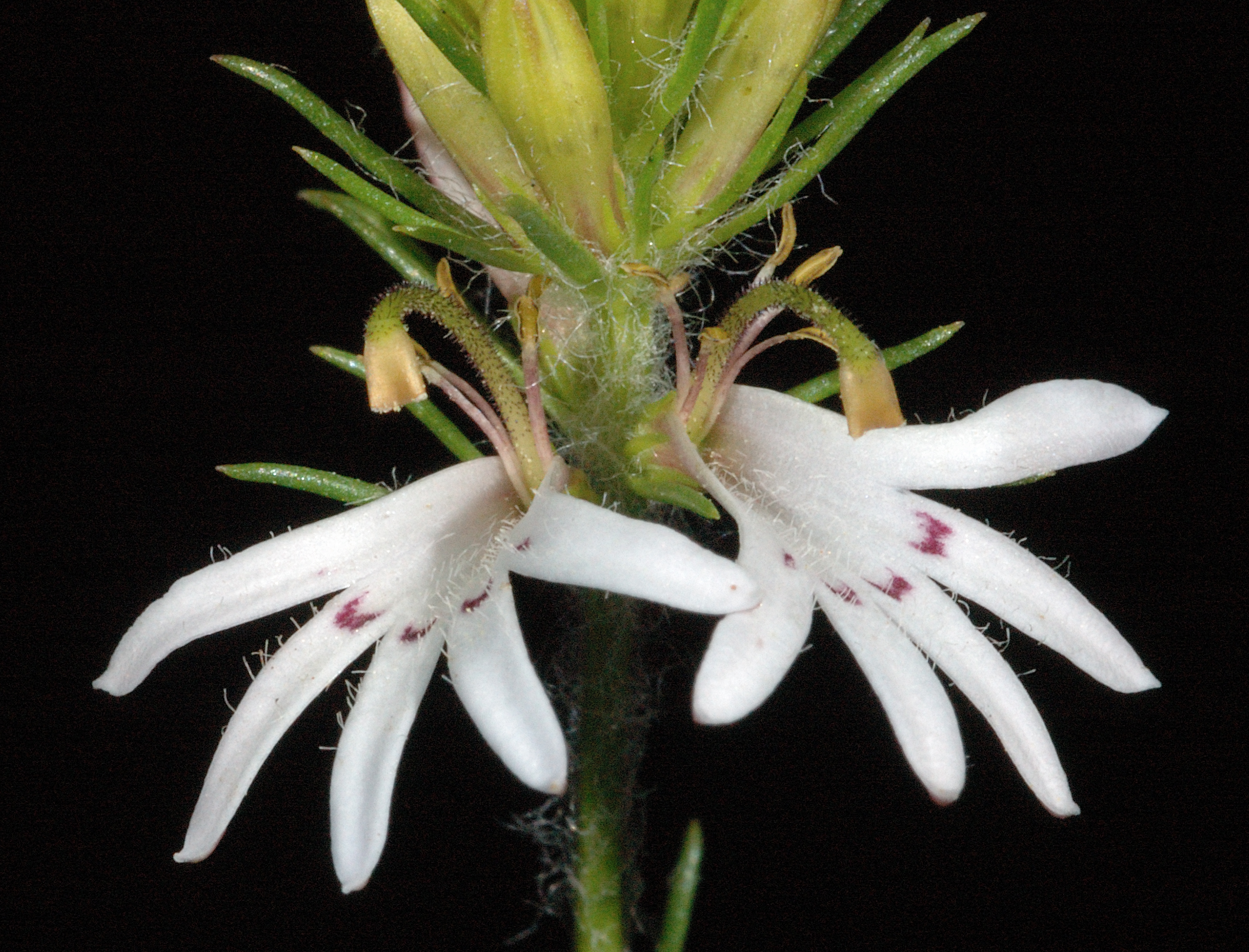

Scientific classification
- Kingdom: Plantae
- Clade: Tracheophytes
- Clade: Angiosperms
- Clade: Eudicots
- Clade: Asterids
- Order: Asterales
- Family: Goodeniaceae
- Genus: Goodenia
- Species: G. fasciculata

Binomial name
- Goodenia fasciculata (Benth.) Carolin

Synonyms
- Goodenia squarrosa de Vriese; Lobelia fasciculata (Benth.) Kuntze; Scaevola fasciculata Benth.; Scaevola fasciculata Benth. var. fasciculata; Scaevola fasciculata var. parviflora E.Pritz.

= Goodenia fasciculata =

Species of plant

Goodenia fasciculata is a species of flowering plant in the family Goodeniaceae and is endemic to the south-west of Western Australia. It an ascending shrub with bunched, narrow linear stem leaves and spikes of white flowers.

== Description ==
Goodenia fasciculata is an ascending shrub 0.2–1 m (7.9 in – 3 ft 3.4 in) tall and hairy when young. The leaves are narrow linear, 6–12 mm (0.24–0.47 in) long and 0.5 mm (0.020 in) wide and arranged in bunches on the stem. The flowers are arranged in a spike 50–80 mm (2.0–3.1 in) long with leaf-like bracts at the base. The sepals are narrow egg-shaped, about 0.5 mm (0.020 in) long, the corolla white, 5–8 mm (0.20–0.31 in) long with more or less equal lobes 2–3.5 mm (0.079–0.138 in) long with wings about 1 mm (0.039 in) wide. Flowering occurs from September to December and the fruit is a more or less spherical nut about 2 mm (0.079 in) in diameter.

== Taxonomy and naming ==
This species was first formally described in 1837 by George Bentham who gave it the name Scaevola fasciculata in Stephan Endlicher's Enumeratio plantarum quas in Novae Hollandiae ora austro-occidentali ad fluvium Cygnorum et in sinu Regis Georgii collegit Carolus Liber Baro de Hügel from material collected near the Swan River by Charles von Hügel. In 1990 Roger Charles Carolin changed the name to Goodenia fasciculata in the journal Telopea.

== Distribution and habitat ==
This goodenia grows in gravelly or sandy soil on granite outcrops and ridges of laterite on and near the Darling Range in the Avon Wheatbelt, Geraldton Sandplains, Jarrah Forest and Swan Coastal Plain biogeographic regions of Western Australia.

== Conservation status ==
Goodenia fasciculata is classified as "not threatened" by the Government of Western Australia Department of Parks and Wildlife.
