= Goodenia lyrata =

Conservation status
- Priority Three — Poorly Known Taxa (DEC)

Scientific classification
- Kingdom: Plantae
- Clade: Tracheophytes
- Clade: Angiosperms
- Clade: Eudicots
- Clade: Asterids
- Order: Asterales
- Family: Goodeniaceae
- Genus: Goodenia
- Species: G. lyrata

Binomial name
- Goodenia lyrata Carolin

Species of plant

Goodenia lyrata is a species of flowering plant in the family Goodeniaceae and is endemic to inland areas of Western Australia. It is a prostrate herb with densely hairy, lyrate leaves at the base of the plant, smaller leaves on the stem and racemes of yellow flowers.

== Description ==
Goodenia lyrata is a prostrate herb with stems up to 13 cm (5.1 in) long. It has lance-shaped, lyrate leaves at the base, 7–28 mm (0.28–1.10 in) long and 2–5 mm (0.079–0.197 in) wide, smaller leaves on the stem. The flowers are arranged in racemes up to 80 mm (3.1 in) long, with leaf-like bracts 5–9 mm (0.20–0.35 in) long, 2–2.5 mm (0.079–0.098 in) wide and smaller bracteoles, each flower on a pedicel 3–5 mm (0.12–0.20 in) long. The sepals are lance-shaped, 2–3 mm (0.079–0.118 in) long, the petals yellow 10–12 mm (0.39–0.47 in) long. The lower lobes of the corolla are about 4 mm (0.16 in) long with wings 1.5–2 mm (0.059–0.079 in) wide. Flowering occurs near August and the fruit is an oval capsule 4–6 mm (0.16–0.24 in) long.

== Taxonomy and naming ==
Goodenia lyrata was first formally described in 1990 Roger Charles Carolin in the journal Telopea. The specific epithet (lyrata) means "lyre-shaped", referring to the leaves at the base of the plant.

== Distribution and habitat ==
This goodenia grows in red, sandy soil in the Gascoyne, Gibson Desert, Great Victoria Desert, Murchison and Pilbara biogeographic regions of inland Western Australia.

== Conservation status ==
Goodenia lyrata is classified as "Priority Three" by the Government of Western Australia Department of Parks and Wildlife meaning that it is poorly known and known from only a few locations but is not under imminent threat.
