= Goodenia perryi =

Conservation status
- Priority Three — Poorly Known Taxa (DEC)

Scientific classification
- Kingdom: Plantae
- Clade: Tracheophytes
- Clade: Angiosperms
- Clade: Eudicots
- Clade: Asterids
- Order: Asterales
- Family: Goodeniaceae
- Genus: Goodenia
- Species: G. perryi

Binomial name
- Goodenia perryi C.A.Gardner ex Carolin

Species of plant

Goodenia perryi is a species of flowering plant in the family Goodeniaceae and is endemic to the south-west of Western Australia. It is an ascending herb or shrub with silvery hairs, lance-shaped leaves at the base of the plant and racemes of blue flowers.

== Description ==
Goodenia perryi is an ascending herb or shrub that typically grows to a height of 25 cm (9.8 in) and is covered with silvery, cottony hairs. The leaves at the base of the plant are lance-shaped with the narrower end towards the base, 40–50 mm (1.6–2.0 in) long and 6–10 mm (0.24–0.39 in) wide. The flowers are arranged in racemes up to about 150 mm (5.9 in) long, with leaf-like bracts and linear bracteoles 2–6 mm (0.079–0.236 in) long. Each flower is on a pedicel 2–3 mm (0.079–0.118 in) long and the sepals are linear, 7–8 mm (0.28–0.31 in) long, the petals blue, 15–18 mm (0.59–0.71 in) long. The lower lobes of the corolla are 8–9 mm (0.31–0.35 in) long with wings about 3 mm (0.12 in) wide. Flowering occurs around October.

== Taxonomy and naming ==
Goodenia perryi was first formally described in 1990 by Roger Charles Carolin in the journal Telopea from a specimen collected by Charles Gardner at Bunjil in 1961. The specific epithet (perryi) probably honours Dick Perry, a forester who worked with Gardner.

== Distribution and habitat ==
This goodenia grows in yellow sand near Bunjil in the Avon Wheatbelt and Yalgoo biogeographic regions of south-western Western Australia.

== Conservation status ==
Goodenia perryi is classified is classified as "Priority Three" by the Government of Western Australia Department of Parks and Wildlife meaning that it is poorly known and known from only a few locations but is not under imminent threat.
