= Goodenia virgata =

Scientific classification
- Kingdom: Plantae
- Clade: Tracheophytes
- Clade: Angiosperms
- Clade: Eudicots
- Clade: Asterids
- Order: Asterales
- Family: Goodeniaceae
- Genus: Goodenia
- Species: G. virgata

Binomial name
- Goodenia virgata Carolin

Species of plant

Goodenia virgata is a species of flowering plant in the family Goodeniaceae and is endemic to the Tanami Desert in central Australia. It is an erect to ascending herb with more or less thick, linear to lance-shaped leaves with the narrower end towards the base, and racemes of yellow flowers.

== Description ==
Goodenia virgata is an erect to ascending, virgate herb that typically grows to a height of up to 40 cm (16 in). The leaves at the base of the plant are more or less thick, linear to lance-shaped with the narrower end towards the base, 10–60 mm (0.39–2.36 in) long and 1–4 mm (0.039–0.157 in) wide, sometimes with toothed edges. Leaves on the stems are smaller. The flowers are arranged in racemes up to 180 mm (7.1 in) long with leaf-like bracts, each flower on a pedicel 15–25 mm (0.59–0.98 in) long. The sepals are linear to lance-shaped, 1.5–2 mm (0.059–0.079 in) long and the petals are yellow and 8–12 mm (0.31–0.47 in) long. The lower lobes of the corolla are 4–5 mm (0.16–0.20 in) long with wings about 1.5 mm (0.059 in) wide. Flowering occurs from May to November.

== Taxonomy and naming ==
Goodenia virgata was first formally described in 1980 by Roger Charles Carolin in the journal Telopea from a specimen he collected near Yuendumu in 1970. The specific epithet (virgata) means "having long, slender twigs", referring to the appearance of the plant after the fruit has fallen.

== Distribution ==
This goodenia grows in sandy soil in the southern Tanami Desert in Western Australia and the Northern Territory.

== Conservation status ==
Goodenia virgata is classified as "not threatened" by the Government of Western Australia Department of Parks and Wildlife and as of "least concern" under the Northern Territory Government Territory Parks and Wildlife Conservation Act 1976.
