= Scaevola argentea =

Scientific classification
- Kingdom: Plantae
- Clade: Tracheophytes
- Clade: Angiosperms
- Clade: Eudicots
- Clade: Asterids
- Order: Asterales
- Family: Goodeniaceae
- Genus: Scaevola
- Species: S. argentea

Binomial name
- Scaevola argentea Carolin
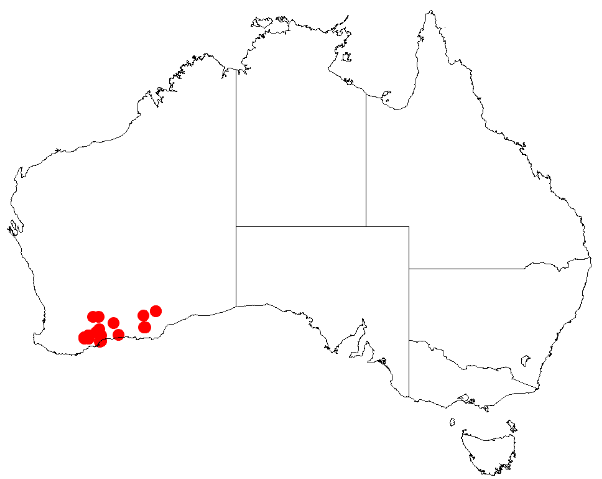
- Occurrence data from Australasian Virtual Herbarium

Species of shrub

Scaevola argentea is a species of flowering plant in the family Goodeniaceae and is endemic to the south-west of Western Australia. It is a prostrate, much-branched, subshrub with sessile, elliptic to egg-shaped leaves with the narrower end towards the base and sometimes toothed, mauve to blue flowers and elliptic, more or less ribbed fruit.

== Description ==
Scaevola argentea, is a prostrate, much-branched subshrub that typically grows to a height of 15 cm (5.9 in) and is covered with silvery hairs. The leaves are sessile, elliptic to egg-shaped, sometimes toothed, usually 8–20 mm (0.31–0.79 in) long and 3–13 mm (0.12–0.51 in) wide. The flowers arranged in dense spikes or spike-like thyrses and with overlapping elliptic bracts 5–10 mm (0.20–0.39 in) long and narrowly elliptic bracteoles 3–4 mm (0.12–0.16 in) long. The sepals are semicircular, about 0.5 mm (0.020 in) long and free from each other. The petals are mauve to blue, 8–13 mm (0.31–0.51 in) long and covered with silvery hairs pressed against the surface on the outside and bearded inside. The ovary has ovary is two locules with a style 3–5 mm (0.12–0.20 in) long. Flowering occurs from March to September, and the fruit is elliptic, about 2 mm (0.079 in) long, more or less ribbed, otherwise smooth and covered with soft hairs.

== Taxonomy ==
Scaevola argentea was first formally described in 1992 by Roger Carolin in the Flora of Australia from specimens collected 5 km (3.1 mi) south of Lake Cobham by Kenneth Newbey in 1972. The specific epithet (argentea) means 'silvery', referring to the colour of the leaves.

== Distribution and habitat ==
This species of Scaevola is found between Ravensthorpe and Ongerup in the Coolgardie, Esperance Plains and Mallee bioregions of south-western Western Australia, where it grows in sandy heath.

== Conservation status ==
Scaevola argentea is listed as "not threatened" by the Government of Western Australia Department of Biodiversity, Conservation and Attractions.
