= Goodenia pascua =

Scientific classification
- Kingdom: Plantae
- Clade: Tracheophytes
- Clade: Angiosperms
- Clade: Eudicots
- Clade: Asterids
- Order: Asterales
- Family: Goodeniaceae
- Genus: Goodenia
- Species: G. pascua

Binomial name
- Goodenia pascua Carolin

Species of plant

Goodenia pascua is a species of flowering plant in the family Goodeniaceae and is endemic to the north-west of Western Australia. It is an ascending to erect herb with bristly hairs, and with narrow elliptic to lance-shaped leaves at the base of the plant and racemes of yellow flowers.

== Description ==
Goodenia pascua is an ascending to erect herb that typically grows to a height of 50 cm (20 in) and is covered with bristly hairs. It has elliptic to lance-shaped leaves at the base of the plant, 40–80 mm (1.6–3.1 in) long and 5–10 mm (0.20–0.39 in) wide, sometimes with teeth on the edges. The flowers are arranged in racemes up to about 200 mm (7.9 in) long, with leaf-like bracts, each flower on a pedicel 20–40 mm (0.79–1.57 in) long. The sepals are lance-shaped, about 2 mm (0.079 in) long, the petals yellow with a brownish throat, 8–10 mm (0.31–0.39 in) long. The lower lobes of the corolla are 4–4.5 mm (0.16–0.18 in) long with wings about 1.5 mm (0.059 in) wide. Flowering occurs from May to August and the fruit is an oval to elliptic capsule 7–8 mm (0.28–0.31 in) long.

== Taxonomy and naming ==
Goodenia pascua was first formally described in 1990 Roger Charles Carolin in the journal Telopea from a specimen he collected on the road between Port Hedland and Roebourne in 1970. The specific epithet (pascua) means "relating to pasture", referring to the grassy habitat of this species.

== Distribution and habitat ==
This goodenia grows in grassy woodland on black soil plains in the Carnarvon, Gascoyne, Pilbara biogeographic regions of north-western Western Australia.

== Conservation status ==
Goodenia pascua is classified as "not threatened" by the Government of Western Australia Department of Parks and Wildlife.
