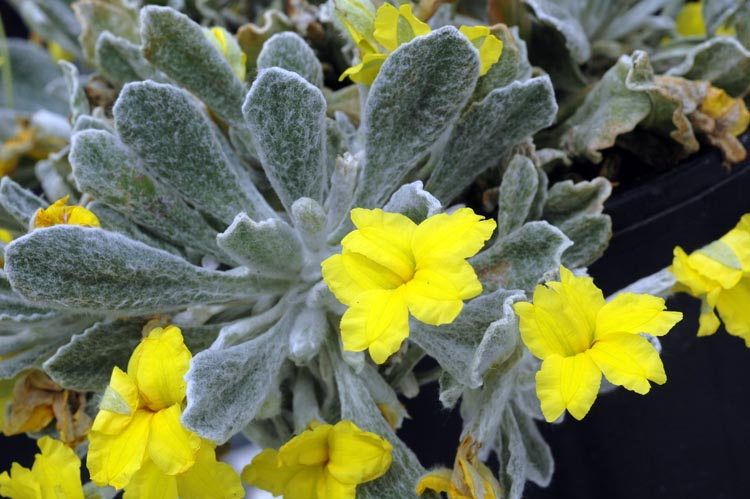
- In the ANBG

Scientific classification
- Kingdom: Plantae
- Clade: Tracheophytes
- Clade: Angiosperms
- Clade: Eudicots
- Clade: Asterids
- Order: Asterales
- Family: Goodeniaceae
- Genus: Goodenia
- Species: G. tripartita

Binomial name
- Goodenia tripartita Carolin

= Goodenia tripartita =

Species of plant

Goodenia tripartita is a species of flowering plant in the family Goodeniaceae and is endemic to the south-west of Western Australia. It is a low-lying to prostrate herb with elliptic to egg-shaped leaves with the narrower end towards the base, mostly at the base of the plant, and racemes of bright yellow flowers.

== Description ==
Goodenia tripartita is a low-lying to prostrate herb with stems up to 15 cm (5.9 in) and soft hairs on the foliage. The leaves at the base of the plant are narrow elliptic to egg-shaped with the narrower end towards the base, 40–70 mm (1.6–2.8 in) long and 10–20 mm (0.39–0.79 in) wide with toothed edges. The flowers are arranged in racemes up to 80 mm (3.1 in) long on peduncles 10–30 mm (0.39–1.18 in) long with leaf-like bracts, each flower on a pedicel 10–20 mm (0.39–0.79 in) long with linear bracteoles about 4 mm (0.16 in) long. The sepals are linear, 4–5 mm (0.16–0.20 in) long and the petals are bright yellow and about 18 mm (0.71 in) long. The lower lobes of the corolla are 8–9 mm (0.31–0.35 in) long with wings about 2.5 mm (0.098 in) wide. Flowering occurs from August to October.

== Taxonomy and naming ==
Goodenia tripartita was first formally described in 1990 by Roger Charles Carolin in the journal Telopea from a specimen he collected between Ongerup and Ravensthorpe in 1961. The specific epithet (tripartita) means "three-partite", referring to the shape of the foliage hair.

== Distribution ==
This goodenia grows in heath in sandy soil, and is found between Morawa, Newdegate and the Stirling Range.

== Conservation status ==
Goodenia tripartita is classified as "not threatened" by the Government of Western Australia Department of Parks and Wildlife.
