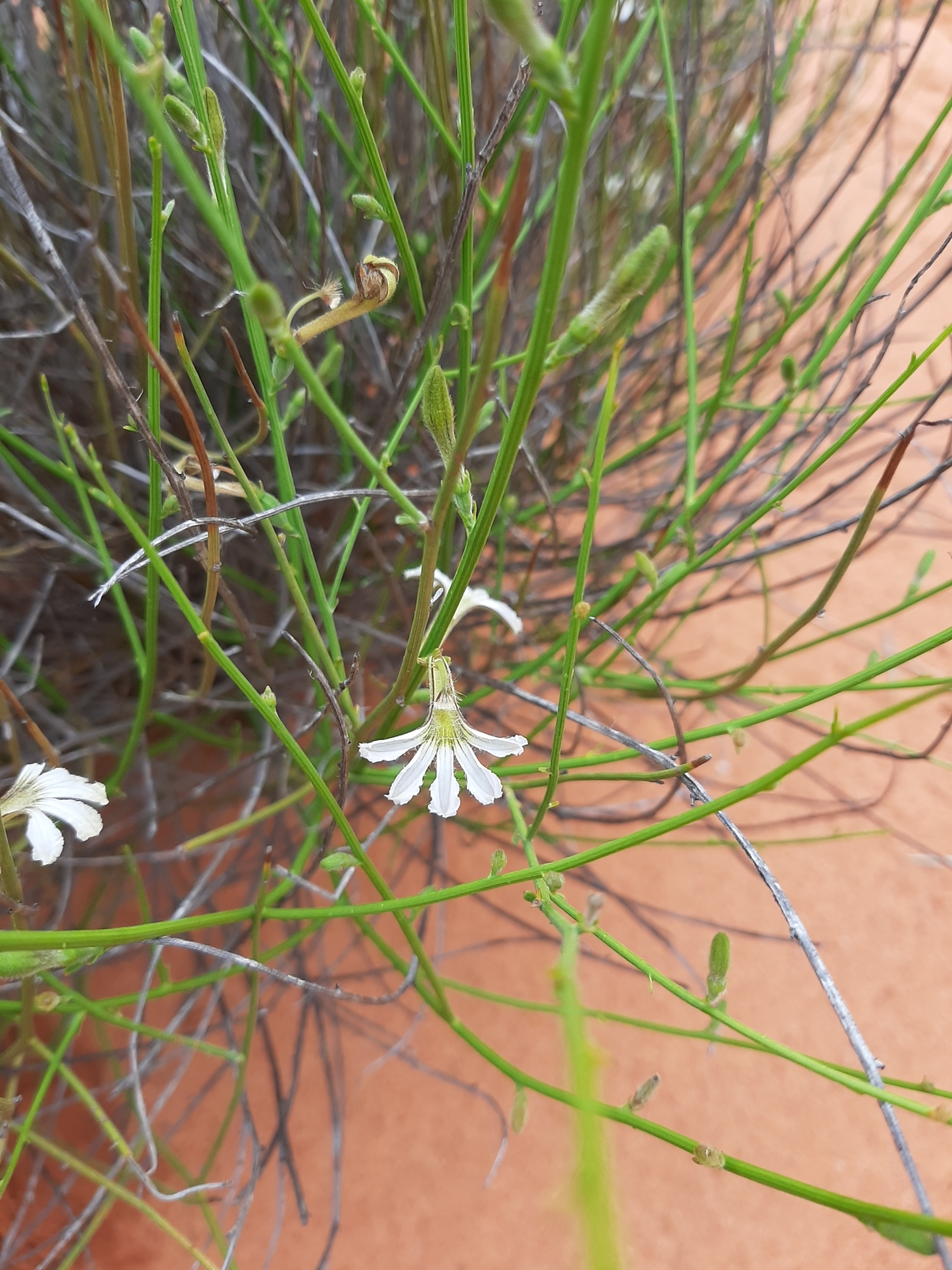

Conservation status
- Priority Two — Poorly Known Taxa (DEC)

Scientific classification
- Kingdom: Plantae
- Clade: Embryophytes
- Clade: Tracheophytes
- Clade: Spermatophytes
- Clade: Angiosperms
- Clade: Eudicots
- Clade: Asterids
- Order: Asterales
- Family: Goodeniaceae
- Genus: Scaevola
- Species: S. chrysopogon

Binomial name
- Scaevola chrysopogon Carolin

= Scaevola chrysopogon =

Species of flowering plant

Scaevola chrysopogon is a species of flowering plant in the family Goodeniaceae and is endemic to Western Australia. It is a small, understorey shrub with narrowly elliptic stem leaves, fan-shaped cream or white flowers and a hairy ovary.

== Description ==
Scaevola chrysopogon is a small, understorey shrub up to 60 cm (24 in) high, with glabrous, slender, ridged stems, or sometimes with scattered hairs flattened against the surface, especially near leaf axils. The leaves at the base of the plant are egg-shaped and toothed, 10–40 mm (0.39–1.57 in) long and 3–10 mm (0.12–0.39 in) wide. The stem leaves are sessile, narrowly elliptic with smooth margins and 2.5–10 mm (0.098–0.394 in) long. The flowers are borne in spikes or thyrses up to 25 cm (9.8 in) long with bracts similar to the stem leaves, on a peduncle less than 2 mm (0.079 in) long. The corolla is cream to white, 13–23 mm (0.51–0.91 in) long, covered with fine, flattened or curved hairs on the outside, thickly bearded inside, and with wings about 1 mm (0.039 in) wide. The ovary is covered with erect, short white hairs. Flowering occurs from August to October.

== Taxonomy and naming ==
Scaevola chrysopogon was first formally described in 1990 by Roger Charles Carolin and the description was published in Telopea. The specific epithet (chrysopogon) means "golden" and "bearded".

== Distribution ==
This scaevola grows near Shark Bay and south to Kalbarri National Park in Western Australia.

== Conservation status ==
Scaevola chrysopogon is listed as "Priority Two" by the Western Australian Government Department of Biodiversity, Conservation and Attractions, meaning that it is poorly known and from only one or a few locations.
