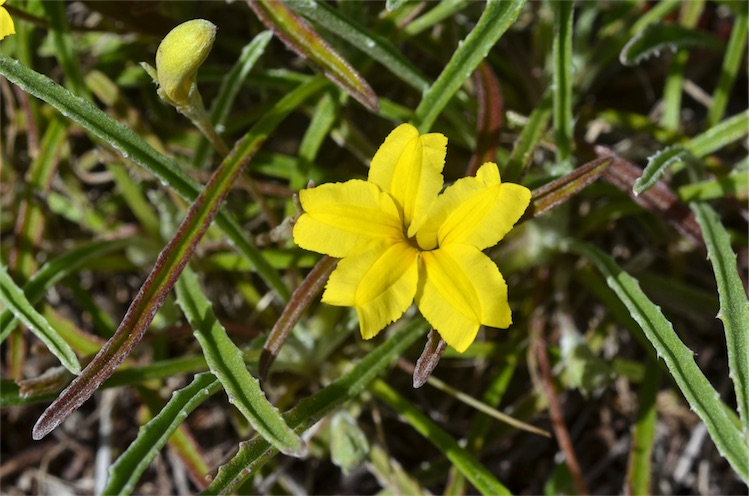
- Goodenia willisiana near Cleve

Scientific classification
- Kingdom: Plantae
- Clade: Tracheophytes
- Clade: Angiosperms
- Clade: Eudicots
- Clade: Asterids
- Order: Asterales
- Family: Goodeniaceae
- Genus: Goodenia
- Species: G. willisiana

Binomial name
- Goodenia willisiana Carolin

= Goodenia willisiana =

Sandhill goodenia

Species of plant

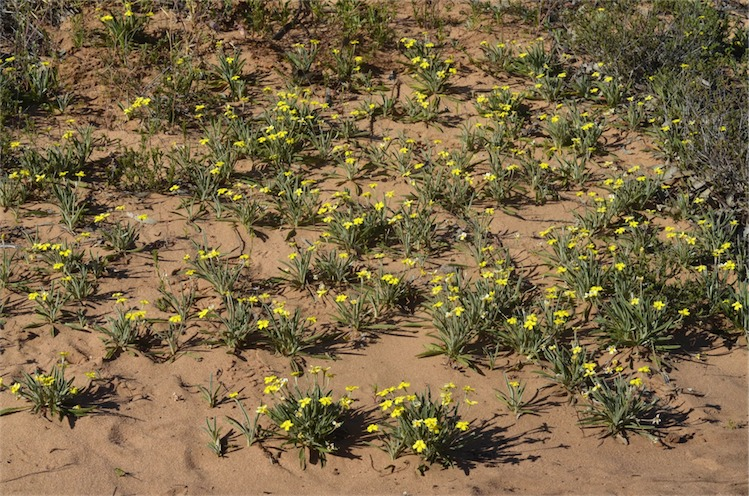
Habit in Wyperfeld National Park

Goodenia willisiana, commonly known as sandhill goodenia, is a species of flowering plant in the family Goodeniaceae and is endemic to drier areas of south-eastern Australia. It is an erect or ascending perennial herb with crowded elliptic to lance-shaped leaves at the base of the plant, and yellow flowers arranged singly in leaf axils.

== Description ==
Goodenia willisiana is an erect or ascending perennial herb up to 20 cm (7.9 in) tall with its foliage covered with white, felt-like hairs. The leaves are crowded at the base of the plant, narrow elliptic to lance-shaped, 40–90 mm (1.6–3.5 in) long and 4–18 mm (0.16–0.71 in) wide, sometimes with wavy edges. The flowers are arranged singly in leaf axils on a stalk up to 100 mm (3.9 in) long with linear bracteoles about 2 mm (0.079 in) long. The sepals are narrow oblong, about 3.5 mm (0.14 in) long, the petals yellow and about 15 mm (0.59 in) long. The lower lobes of the corolla are 5–6 mm (0.20–0.24 in) long with wings about 2.5 mm (0.098 in) wide. Flowering mainly occurs from August to February and the fruit is an oval capsule about 10 mm (0.39 in) long.

== Taxonomy and naming ==
Goodenia willisiana was first formally described in 1990 by Roger Charles Carolin in the journal Telopea from material collected by James Hamlyn Willis near Redcliffs in 1937. The specific epithet (willisiana) honours J.H. Willis.

== Distribution and habitat ==
This goodenia grows in western New South Wales, north-western Victoria and south-eastern South Australia, often on sandhills and in mallee communities.
