= Goodenia campestris =

Scientific classification
- Kingdom: Plantae
- Clade: Tracheophytes
- Clade: Angiosperms
- Clade: Eudicots
- Clade: Asterids
- Order: Asterales
- Family: Goodeniaceae
- Genus: Goodenia
- Species: G. campestris

Binomial name
- Goodenia campestris Carolin

Species of plant

Goodenia campestris is a species of flowering plant in the family Goodeniaceae and is endemic to northern Australia. It is a low-lying herb with egg-shaped to lance-shaped stem leaves and racemes of yellowish flowers with purple veins.

== Description ==
Goodenia campestris is a low-lying to ascending herb with more or less glabrous stems up to 0.5 m (1 ft 8 in) long. The leaves are mostly stem leaves that are egg-shaped to lance-shaped, 10–30 mm (0.39–1.18 in) long and 4–10 mm (0.16–0.39 in) wide, toothed and sessile. The flowers are arranged in racemes on the ends of the stems, up to 300 mm (12 in) long on a peduncle 40–70 mm (1.6–2.8 in) long, each flower on a pedicel 15–70 mm (0.59–2.76 in) long with leaf-like bracts at the base. The sepals are lance-shaped to narrow oblong, 1–2 mm (0.039–0.079 in) long, the petals yellowish with purple veins, 7–8 mm (0.28–0.31 in) long. The lower lobes of the corolla are about 2 mm (0.079 in) long with wings about 0.5–1 mm (0.020–0.039 in) wide. Flowering has been recorded in May and the fruit is a more or less spherical capsule about 5 mm (0.20 in) long .

== Taxonomy and naming ==
Goodenia campestris was first formally described in 1990 by Roger Charles Carolin in the journal Telopea from material he collected near Timber Creek in 1968. The specific epithet (campestris) means "pertaining to a field", referring to the grassy plains where this species grows.

== Distribution and habitat ==
This goodenia grows in grassland on black soil plains in the Victoria Bonaparte region of the Northern Territory and Western Australia.

== Conservation status ==
Goodenia campestris is classified as "not threatened" by the Government of Western Australia Department of Parks and Wildlife, and as "data deficient" under the Northern Territory Government Territory Parks and Wildlife Conservation Act 1976.
