= Buddleja axillaris =

Scientific classification
- Kingdom: Plantae
- Clade: Embryophytes
- Clade: Tracheophytes
- Clade: Spermatophytes
- Clade: Angiosperms
- Clade: Eudicots
- Clade: Asterids
- Order: Lamiales
- Family: Scrophulariaceae
- Genus: Buddleja
- Species: B. axillaris

Binomial name
- Buddleja axillaris Willd. ex Roem. & Schult.

Synonyms
- Adenoplusia axillaris Radlk.; Adenoplusia willdenowii Radlk.; Adenoplusia ulugurensis Melch.; Buddleja comorensis Bak.

Species of flowering plant

Buddleja axillaris is a shrub endemic to Madagascar, the Comoro Islands, and Tanzania, growing in forests at elevations of 300–1400 m. The species was first named and described by Willdenow in 1827.

== Description ==
Buddleja axillaris is a sarmentose shrub 2–3 m in height, with quadrangular branchlets, often obscurely winged, and white-pubescent. The opposite leaves have thinly coriaceous ovate to narrowly elliptic blades, 6–30 cm long by 2–10 cm wide, acuminate or apiculate, abruptly narrowed at the base, minutely pilose above, but white-tomentose to subglabrous beneath, with mostly shallow crenate - dentate margins. The slender white or occasionally yellow inflorescences are axillary, solitary and thyrsoid 3–14 cm long by 1–4 cm wide, the corollas 5–17 mm long.

The species is considered closely related to B. cuspidata and B. sphaerocalyx.

== Cultivation ==
Buddleja axillaris is not common in cultivation. Hardiness: USDA zone 10.
