= Goodenia expansa =

Scientific classification
- Kingdom: Plantae
- Clade: Tracheophytes
- Clade: Angiosperms
- Clade: Eudicots
- Clade: Asterids
- Order: Asterales
- Family: Goodeniaceae
- Genus: Goodenia
- Species: G. expansa

Binomial name
- Goodenia expansa A.E.Holland & T.P.Boyle

Species of plant

Goodenia expansa is a species of flowering plant in the family Goodeniaceae and is endemic to Queensland. It is an annual or short-lived perennial herb with narrow elliptic to lance-shaped leaves at the base of the plant, and leafy racemes of pale yellow or cream-coloured flowers.

== Description ==
Goodenia expansa is an annual or short-lived perennial, prostrate herb that spreads up to 1 m (3 ft 3 in) and is covered with white hairs. The leaves are arranged at the base of the plant and are narrow elliptic to lance-shaped with the narrower end towards the base, 50–80 mm (2.0–3.1 in) long and 5–20 mm (0.20–0.79 in) wide with toothed edges, on a petiole 20–40 mm (0.79–1.57 in) long. The flowers are arranged in leafy racemes up to 60 cm (24 in) long on a peduncle 6–30 mm (0.24–1.18 in) long, each flower on a pedicel 6–35 mm (0.24–1.38 in) long. The sepals are linear, 6–12 mm (0.24–0.47 in) long, the petals yellow or cream-coloured, 15–20 mm (0.59–0.79 in) long, the lower lobes 6–8 mm (0.24–0.31 in) long with wings about 1.5–2.2 mm (0.059–0.087 in) wide. Flowering occurs in spring and the fruit is an elliptic capsule 8–13 mm (0.31–0.51 in) long and 4–6 mm (0.16–0.24 in) wide.

== Taxonomy and naming ==
Goodenia expansa was first formally described in 2002 by Ailsa E. Holland and T.P. Boyle in the journal Austrobaileya from specimens collected on Cuddapan Station. The specific epithet (expansa) refers to the spreading habit of the mature plant.

== Distribution and habitat ==
This goodenia grows on sandplain with Corymbia terminalis and species of Triodia near Winton in central Queensland.

== Conservation status ==
Goodenia expansa is listed as of "least concern" under the Queensland Government Nature Conservation Act 1992.
