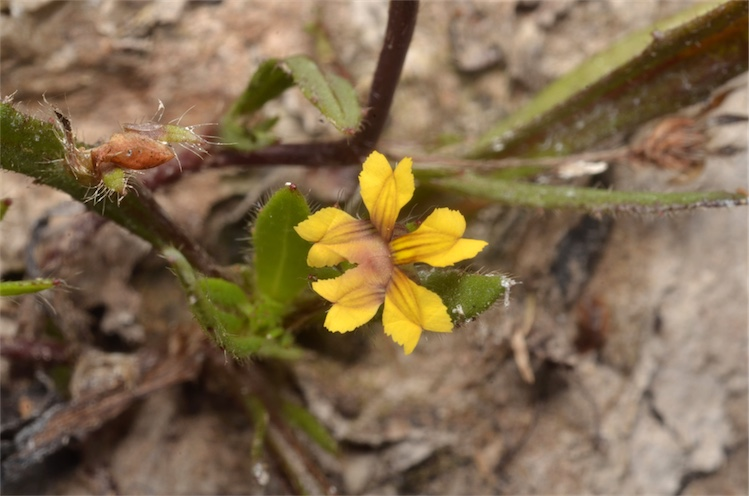
- Near Cardwell

Scientific classification
- Kingdom: Plantae
- Clade: Tracheophytes
- Clade: Angiosperms
- Clade: Eudicots
- Clade: Asterids
- Order: Asterales
- Family: Goodeniaceae
- Genus: Goodenia
- Species: G. pilosa

Binomial name
- Goodenia pilosa (R.Br.) Carolin

Synonyms
- Balingayum decumbens Blanco; Calogyne chinensis Benth.; Calogyne heteroptera F.Muell.; Calogyne pilosa R.Br.; Goodenia dubia Spreng. nom. illeg.; Goodenia heteroptera (F.Muell.) B.D.Jacks.; Goodenia heteroptera (F.Muell.) Carolin nom. superfl.

= Goodenia pilosa =

Species of plant

Goodenia pilosa is a species of flowering plant in the family Goodeniaceae and is native to northern Australia and to parts of Asia. It is a prostrate to low-lying herb with erect hairs, narrow oblong to narrow elliptic leaves at the base of the plant and racemes of yellow flowers with a purplish base.

== Description ==
Goodenia pilosa is a prostrate to low-lying herb with stems up to 50 cm (20 in) long with erect hairs on the foliage. It has narrow oblong to elliptic leaves at the base of the plant, 10–120 mm (0.39–4.72 in) long and 3–13 mm (0.12–0.51 in) wide, with teeth on the edges. The flowers are arranged in racemes up to about 350 mm (14 in) long, with leaf-like bracts, each flower on a pedicel 2–2.5 mm (0.079–0.098 in) long. The sepals are lance-shaped to narrow oblong, about 3–5 mm (0.12–0.20 in) long, the petals yellow with a purplish base, 8–15 mm (0.31–0.59 in) long. The lower lobes of the corolla are 3–5 mm (0.12–0.20 in) long with wings 1.5–2 mm (0.059–0.079 in) wide. Flowering occurs from May to August and the fruit is a more or less spherical capsule 2–3.5 mm (0.079–0.138 in) in diameter.

== Taxonomy and naming ==
This species was first formally described in 1810 by Robert Brown who gave it the name Calogyne pilosa in his Prodromus Florae Novae Hollandiae et Insulae Van Diemen. In 1990 Roger Charles Carolin changed the name to Goodenia pilosa in the journal Telopea. The specific epithet (pilosa) means "hairy".

== Distribution and habitat ==
Goodenia pilosa usually grows in moist, sandy soil and is found in Arnhem Land and northern Queensland. It also occurs in Indonesia, China and the Philippines.

== Conservation status ==
Goodenia pilosa is classified as of "least concern" under the Queensland Government Nature Conservation Act 1992.
