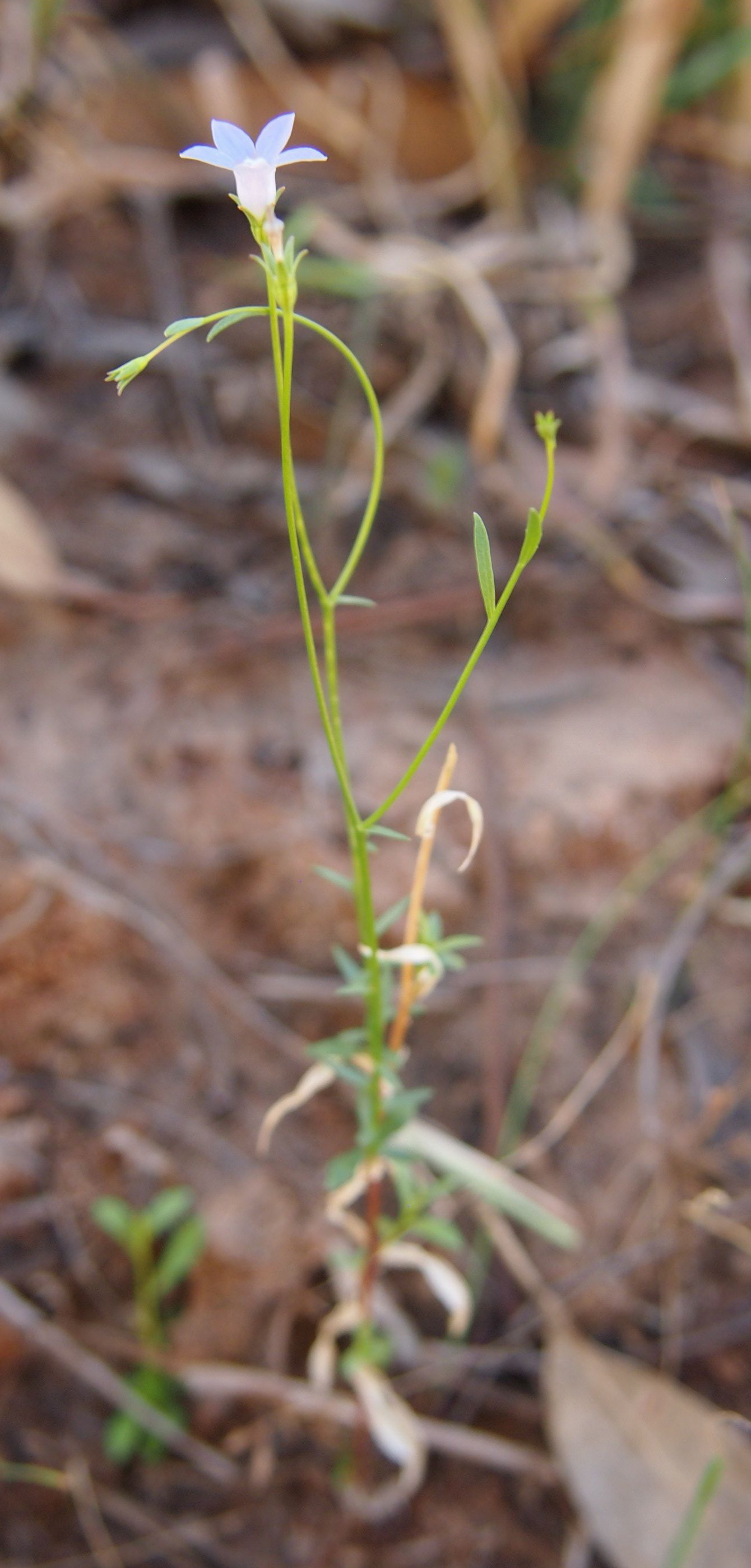

Scientific classification
- Kingdom: Plantae
- Clade: Embryophytes
- Clade: Tracheophytes
- Clade: Spermatophytes
- Clade: Angiosperms
- Clade: Eudicots
- Clade: Asterids
- Order: Asterales
- Family: Campanulaceae
- Genus: Wahlenbergia
- Species: W. queenslandica

Binomial name
- Wahlenbergia queenslandica Carolin ex P.J.Sm.
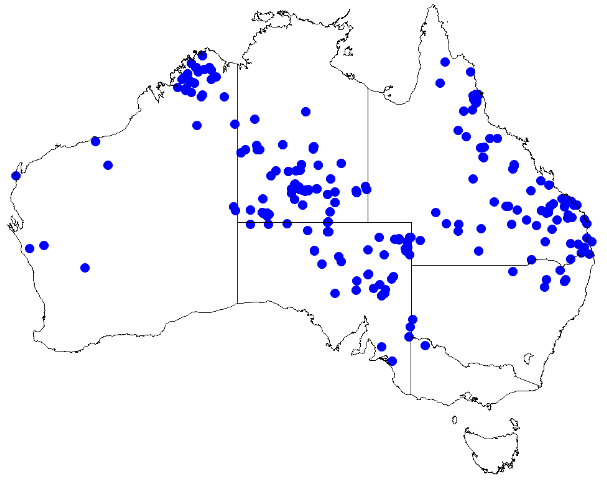
- Occurrence data from Australasian Virtual Herbarium

= Wahlenbergia queenslandica =

Species of plant

Wahlenbergia queenslandica is a small herbaceous plant in the family Campanulaceae native to Australia, specifically in the regions of Western Australia, New South Wales, Queensland, the Northern Territory, and South Australia.

The straggling to erect to ascending perennial herb typically grows to a height of 0.3 to 1.0 metre (1 to 3 ft). It blooms between April and September producing blue-purple flowers in Western Australia. However, in the Northern Territory it flowers from February through to December and fruits from February to November, while in New South Wales it flowers throughout the year.

It is similar to W. communis: both have large corollas with long lobes, however W. communis differs in having a strictly alternate leaf arrangement, long hairs on the inner surface of the corolla tube near the base, and obconical (and frequently more elongated) fruit.

The species is usually found on the edges of swamps and creek beds and damp flats in the Kimberley region of Western Australia where it grows in sandy-loam soils. In the Northern Territory it is found on mulga-dominated plains, alluvial plains and intermittent watercourses.
