= Scaevola acacioides =

Scientific classification
- Kingdom: Plantae
- Clade: Tracheophytes
- Clade: Angiosperms
- Clade: Eudicots
- Clade: Asterids
- Order: Asterales
- Family: Goodeniaceae
- Genus: Scaevola
- Species: S. acacioides

Binomial name
- Scaevola acacioides Carolin
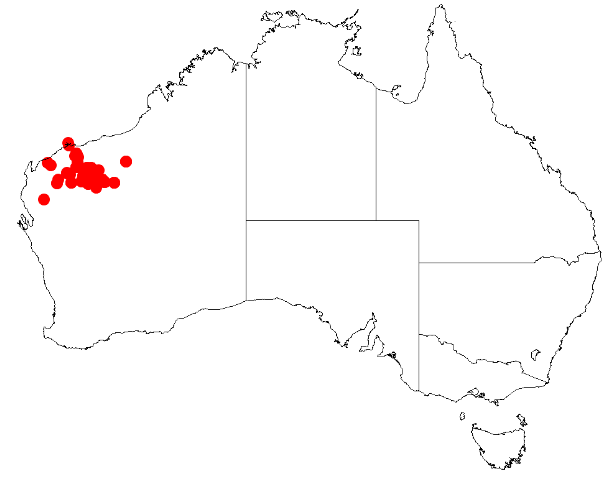
- Occurrence data from Australasian Virtual Herbarium

Species of shrub

Scaevola acacioides is a species of flowering plant in the family Goodeniaceae and is endemic to the north of Western Australia. It is an erect, spreading shrub with sessile, narrowly oblong to elliptic leaves, hairy, white to cream-coloured flowers arranged singly or in groups and oval fruit.

== Description ==
Scaevola acacioides is an erect, spreading shrub that typically grows to a height of 1 m (3 ft 3 in) and has hairy young parts. The leaves are sessile, narrowly oblong to elliptic, tapering towards the base, 25–50 mm (0.98–1.97 in) long and 2–5 mm (0.079–0.197 in) wide. The flowers are arranged in groups, sometimes single in leaf axils, on a peduncle 8–15 mm (0.31–0.59 in) long with Δ-shaped bracteoles 1.0–1.5 mm (0.039–0.059 in) long at the base. The sepals are wavy, about 0.5 mm (0.020 in) long and the petals are white to cream-coloured, 10–13 mm (0.39–0.51 in) long, covered with glandular hairs and densely bearded inside. It flowers in March, May or August and the fruit is oval, up to 5 mm (0.20 in) long, glabrous and black.

== Taxonomy ==
Scaevola acacioides was first formally described in 1990 by Roger Carolin in the journal Telopea from specimens collected in Bee Gorge in the Wittenoom area in 1966. The specific epithet (acacioides) refers to "the superficial similarity of the leaves to the phyllodes of some Acacia species".

== Distribution and habitat ==
This species of Scaevola grows in red, gravelly sandy soils in the Carnarvon, Gascoyne, and Pilbara bioregions of northern Western Australia.

== Conservation status ==
Scaevola acacioides is listed as "not threatened" by the Government of Western Australia Department of Biodiversity, Conservation and Attractions.
