= Scaevola pulchella =

Scientific classification
- Kingdom: Plantae
- Clade: Tracheophytes
- Clade: Angiosperms
- Clade: Eudicots
- Clade: Asterids
- Order: Asterales
- Family: Goodeniaceae
- Genus: Scaevola
- Species: S. pulchella

Binomial name
- Scaevola pulchella Carolin

Species of flowering plant

Scaevola pulchella is a species of flowering plant in the family Goodeniaceae. It is a small, spreading shrub with blue to mauve flowers borne on terminal spikes and is endemic to Western Australia.

== Description ==
Scaevola pulchella is a decumbent to prostrate much-branched perennial herb or shrub up to 90 cm (35 in) high. The stems are slender, more or less ridged and covered with silvery, long, spreading, soft hairs. The leaves are sessile, linear to elliptic to oblong-lance shaped, 15–40 mm (0.59–1.57 in) long, 4–10 mm (0.16–0.39 in) wide, margins usually smooth to finely toothed, covered with more or less thick simple hairs, and the larger leaves rounded with a point. The flowers are borne in terminal spikes up to 10 cm (3.9 in) long, bracteoles narrowly linear to elliptic, 4–8 mm (0.16–0.31 in) long with clearly visible silky hairs in the leaf axils. The blue-mauve corolla is 1.3–2.2 cm (0.51–0.87 in) long with simple hairs on the outer surface and more or less bearded on the inside and the flowers fan-shaped. Flowering occurs from June to October and the fruit is ellipsoidal or globe-shaped, covered with simple hairs, and measures up to 4 mm (0.16 in) in diameter covered with simple hairs.

== Taxonomy naming ==
Scaevola pulchella was first formally described in 1990 by Roger Charles Carolin and the description was published in Telopea. The specific epithet (pulchella) means "beautiful and small".

== Distribution and habitat ==
This scaevola grows on the spinifex plains near Carnarvon and east of Exmouth Gulf.
