= Goodenia purpurascens =

Scientific classification
- Kingdom: Plantae
- Clade: Tracheophytes
- Clade: Angiosperms
- Clade: Eudicots
- Clade: Asterids
- Order: Asterales
- Family: Goodeniaceae
- Genus: Goodenia
- Species: G. purpurascens

Binomial name
- Goodenia purpurascens R.Br.

Species of plant

Goodenia purpurascens is a species of flowering plant in the family Goodeniaceae and is native to northern Australia and New Guinea. It is usually a perennial herb with linear to lance-shaped leaves at the base of the plant, and thyrses or panicles of purple flowers.

== Description ==
Goodenia purpurascens is usually a perennial herb that typically grows to a height of 50 cm (20 in) and has adventitious roots. The leaves are linear to lance-shaped with the narrower end towards the base, ascending and mostly at the base of the plant, 30–200 mm (1.2–7.9 in) long and 2–15 mm (0.079–0.591 in) wide. The flowers are arranged in spreading thyrses or panicles racemes up to 300 mm (12 in) long, with linear bracts up to 20 mm (0.79 in) long and smaller bracteoles. Each flower is on a pedicel 5–10 mm (0.20–0.39 in) long with lance-shaped sepals 1–1.5 mm (0.039–0.059 in) long. The petals are purple, 8–12 mm (0.31–0.47 in) long, the lower lobes of the corolla 3–5 mm (0.12–0.20 in) long with wings 1–2 mm (0.039–0.079 in) wide. Flowering mainly occurs from January to May and the fruit is an oval to spherical capsule 2–4 mm (0.079–0.157 in) long.

== Taxonomy and naming ==
Goodenia purpurascens was first formally described in 1810 by Robert Brown in his Prodromus Florae Novae Hollandiae et Insulae Van Diemen. The specific epithet (purpurascens) means "purplish".

== Distribution and habitat ==
This goodenia grows in creek beds and heavy clay in the Kimberley region of Western Australia, northern parts of the Northern Territory and Queensland and in New Guinea.
