= Goodenia konigsbergeri =

Scientific classification
- Kingdom: Plantae
- Clade: Embryophytes
- Clade: Tracheophytes
- Clade: Spermatophytes
- Clade: Angiosperms
- Clade: Eudicots
- Clade: Asterids
- Order: Asterales
- Family: Goodeniaceae
- Genus: Goodenia
- Species: G. konigsbergeri

Binomial name
- Goodenia konigsbergeri (Backer) Backer ex. Bold

Synonyms
- Selliera koningsbergeri Backer

Species of plant

Goodenia konigsbergeri is a species of flowering plant in the family Goodeniaceae and is endemic to Southeast Asia. It is a creeping stoloniferous herb with egg-shaped to spatula-shaped leaves and solitary pale yellow and white flowers.

== Description ==
Goodenia konigsbergeri is a creeping herb with stems up to 50 cm (20 in) long, forming stolons 15–20 mm (0.59–0.79 in) apart along the stems. The leaves are arranged in a rosette at the base of the plant and along the stems and are egg-shaped with the narrower end towards the base, to spatula-shaped, 20–40 mm (0.79–1.57 in) long and 10–25 mm (0.39–0.98 in) wide, on a petiole 5–40 mm (0.20–1.57 in) long. The leaves are slightly fleshy, pale green and have a few scattered teeth on the edges. The flowers are 7–10 mm (0.28–0.39 in) long and arranged singly in leaf axils on a pedicel 5–15 mm (0.20–0.59 in) long. The sepals are lance-shaped, 2–3.5 mm (0.079–0.138 in) long, the corolla pale yellow and white, 5–8 mm (0.20–0.31 in) long. Flowering occurs from December to August and the fruit is a slightly flattened spherical capsule about 5–6 mm (0.20–0.24 in) in diameter.

== Taxonomy and naming ==
This goodenia was first formally described in 1913 by Cornelis Andries Backer who gave it the name Selliera konigsbergeri in the Bulletin du Jardin botanique de Buitenzorg. In 1916, Isaäc Boldingh changed the name to Goodenia konigsbergeri in Zakflora voor der Landouwstreken op Java.

== Distribution and habitat ==
Goodenia konigsbergeri grows as a weed of dry rice-field at altitudes from sea level to an altitude of 400 m (1,300 ft) in Cambodia, Java, the Lesser Sunda Islands, Thailand and Vietnam.
