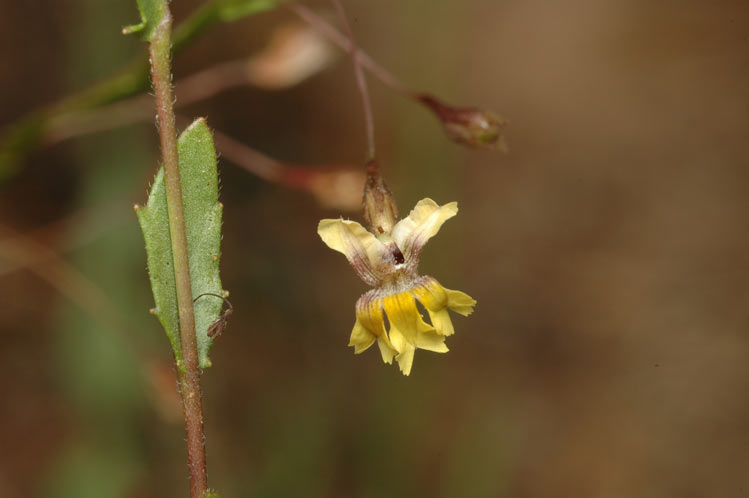
- In Kakadu National Park

Scientific classification
- Kingdom: Plantae
- Clade: Tracheophytes
- Clade: Angiosperms
- Clade: Eudicots
- Clade: Asterids
- Order: Asterales
- Family: Goodeniaceae
- Genus: Goodenia
- Species: G. armstrongiana

Binomial name
- Goodenia armstrongiana de Vriese

= Goodenia armstrongiana =

Species of plant

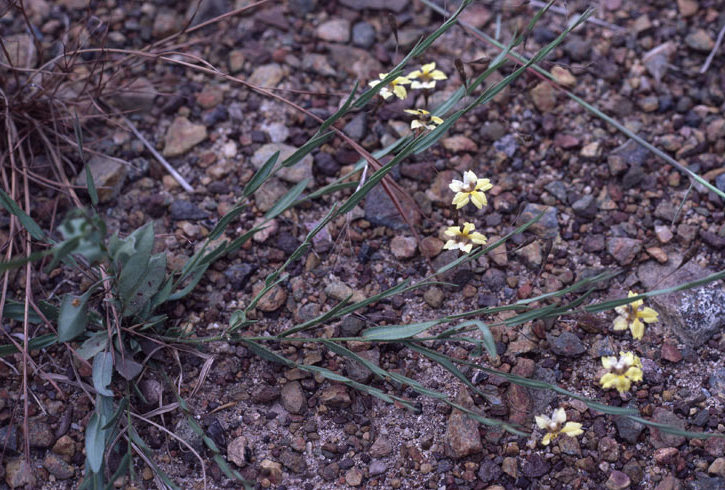
Habit in Arnhem Land

Goodenia armstrongiana is a species of flowering plant in the family Goodeniaceae and is native to northern Australia and New Guinea. It is an erect to low-lying herb with egg-shaped to narrow elliptic leaves, sometimes with small teeth on the edges, racemes of white or yellow flowers with leaf-like bracts at the base, and oval fruit.

== Description ==
Goodenia armstrongiana is an erect to low-lying herb with stems up to 600 mm (24 in) long. The stem leaves are egg-shaped to narrow elliptic, 10–40 mm (0.39–1.57 in) long and 2–12 mm (0.079–0.472 in) wide, sometimes with small teeth on the edges and hairy mostly on the edges. The flowers are arranged in racemes up to 400 mm (16 in) long, each flower on a pedicel 10–30 mm (0.39–1.18 in) long with leaf-like bracts at the base. The sepals are lance-shaped, 1–2 mm (0.039–0.079 in) long and the corolla is white or yellow, 8–12 mm (0.31–0.47 in) long and hairy inside. The lower lobes of the corolla are 3–4 mm (0.12–0.16 in) long with wings 1.5–2 mm (0.059–0.079 in) wide. Flowering mainly occurs from January to July and the fruit is an oval capsule 4–6 mm (0.16–0.24 in) long.

== Taxonomy and naming ==
Goodenis armstrongiana was first formally described in 1854 by Willem Hendrik de Vriese in the journal Natuurkundige Verhandelingen van de Hollandsche Maatschappij der Wetenschappen te Haarlem. The specific epithet (armstrongiana) honours John Armstrong who collected the type material.

== Distribution and habitat ==
This goodenia grows in woodland and savanna from Arnhem Land and the Victoria River district in the Northern Territory to north Queensland and New Guinea.

== Conservation status ==
Goodenia armstrongiana is classified as of "least concern" under the Queensland Government Nature Conservation Act 1992 and the Northern Territory Government Territory Parks and Wildlife Conservation Act 1976.
