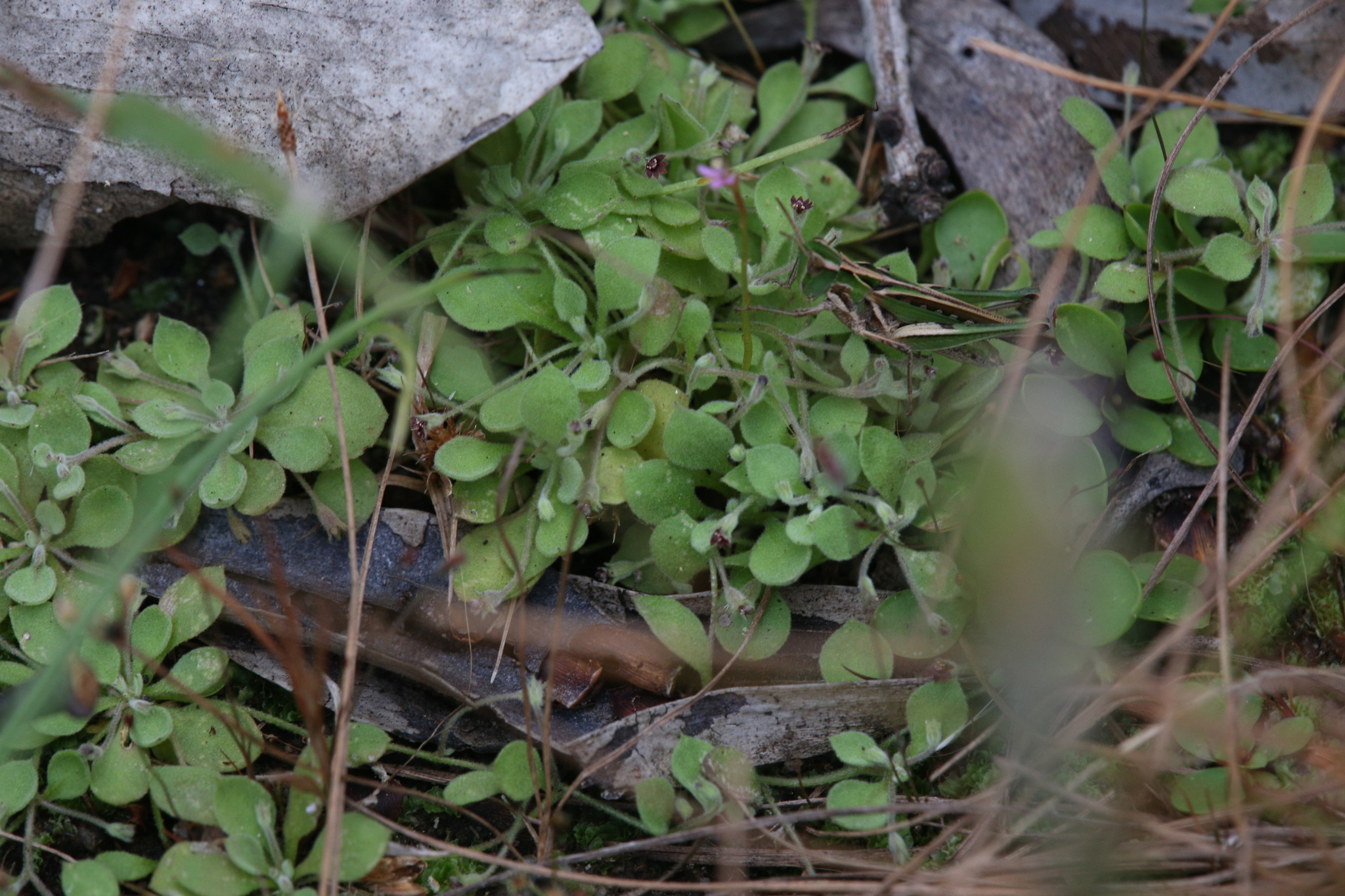

Scientific classification
- Kingdom: Plantae
- Clade: Tracheophytes
- Clade: Angiosperms
- Clade: Eudicots
- Clade: Asterids
- Order: Asterales
- Family: Goodeniaceae
- Genus: Goodenia
- Species: G. pumilio

Binomial name
- Goodenia pumilio R.Br.

= Goodenia pumilio =

Species of plant

Goodenia pumilio is a species of flowering plant in the family Goodeniaceae and is native to northern Australia and New Guinea. It is a prostrate, stolon-forming herb with egg-shaped to lance-shaped leaves in rosettes, and racemes of small, dark reddish-purple flowers.

== Description ==
Goodenia pumilio is a prostrate, stolon-forming herb with stems up to 50 cm (20 in) with scattered, star-shaped hairs. The leaves are egg-shaped to lance-shaped with the narrower end towards the base, arranged in rosettes at the base of the plant and on the stolons, 8–25 mm (0.31–0.98 in) long and 4–10 mm (0.16–0.39 in) wide. The flowers are arranged in racemes up to 50 mm (2.0 in) long, sometimes singly in leaf axils, with leaf-like bracts 1.5–2 mm (0.059–0.079 in) long. Each flower is on a pedicel 7–17 mm (0.28–0.67 in) long with lance-shaped sepals up to 1 mm (0.039 in) long. The petals are dark reddish purple, 1.0–1.5 mm (0.039–0.059 in) long, the lower lobes of the corolla 0.5–1 mm (0.020–0.039 in) long and lacking wings. Flowering mainly occurs from April to July and the fruit is an oval capsule about 2 mm (0.079 in) long.

== Taxonomy and naming ==
Goodenia pumilio was first formally described in 1810 by Robert Brown in his Prodromus Florae Novae Hollandiae et Insulae Van Diemen. The specific epithet (pumilio) means "dwarf".

== Distribution and habitat ==
This goodenia grows in marshes and swamps in the Kimberley region of Western Australia, northern parts of the Northern Territory and Queensland and in New Guinea.
