= Buddleja sphaerocalyx =

Scientific classification
- Kingdom: Plantae
- Clade: Tracheophytes
- Clade: Angiosperms
- Clade: Eudicots
- Clade: Asterids
- Order: Lamiales
- Family: Scrophulariaceae
- Genus: Buddleja
- Species: B. sphaerocalyx

Binomial name
- Buddleja sphaerocalyx Baker

Species of flowering plant

Buddleja sphaerocalyx is a species of flowering plant endemic to Madagascar. It grows in moist forests, principally along river banks, at altitudes of 300 – 2,200 m. The species was named and described in 1887 by Baker.

== Description ==
Buddleja sphaerocalyx is a sarmentose shrub 2 – 3 m in height, the branchlets obscurely quadrangular, bearing opposite, connate-perfoliate leaves, 10 – 21 cm long by 3.0 – 11 cm wide, narrowly ovate, acuminate at the apex, and narrowing abruptly at the base; the margins irregularly crenate - dentate. The white inflorescences comprise solitary axillary flowers 4 – 10 cm long by 1.5 – 6 cm wide; the corollas 8.5 – 20 mm long.

Buddleja sphaerocalyx is closely allied to B. axillaris and B. cuspidata.

== Cultivation ==
Buddleja sphaerocalyx is not known to be in cultivation.
