= Buddleja cuspidata =

Scientific classification
- Kingdom: Plantae
- Clade: Tracheophytes
- Clade: Angiosperms
- Clade: Eudicots
- Clade: Asterids
- Order: Lamiales
- Family: Scrophulariaceae
- Genus: Buddleja
- Species: B. cuspidata

Binomial name
- Buddleja cuspidata Baker

Species of flowering plant

Buddleja cuspidata is a species endemic to Madagascar, where it grows along river banks. The species was first named and described by Baker in 1895.

== Description ==
Buddleja cuspidata is a shrub 3–4 m in height, with brown tomentose branchlets, obscurely quadrangular. The opposite, thinly coriaceous leaves' blades are ovate or elliptic, 9–20 cm long by 4–9 cm wide, acuminate at the apex, decurrent into the petiole, sparsely pubescent above, brown tomentose beneath; the margins serrate-dentate to crenate-dentate. The narrow yellow inflorescences are axillary and spicate, 3–15 cm long by 1–1.5 cm wide; the corollas 7.5–8.5 mm long.

Buddleja cuspidata is considered closely allied to B. axillaris and B. sphaerocalyx.

== Cultivation ==
Buddleja cuspidata is not known to be in cultivation.
