= Thyrse =

Type of inflorescence in botany

A thyrse is a type of inflorescence in which the main axis grows indeterminately, and the subaxes (branches) have determinate growth.

== Gallery ==
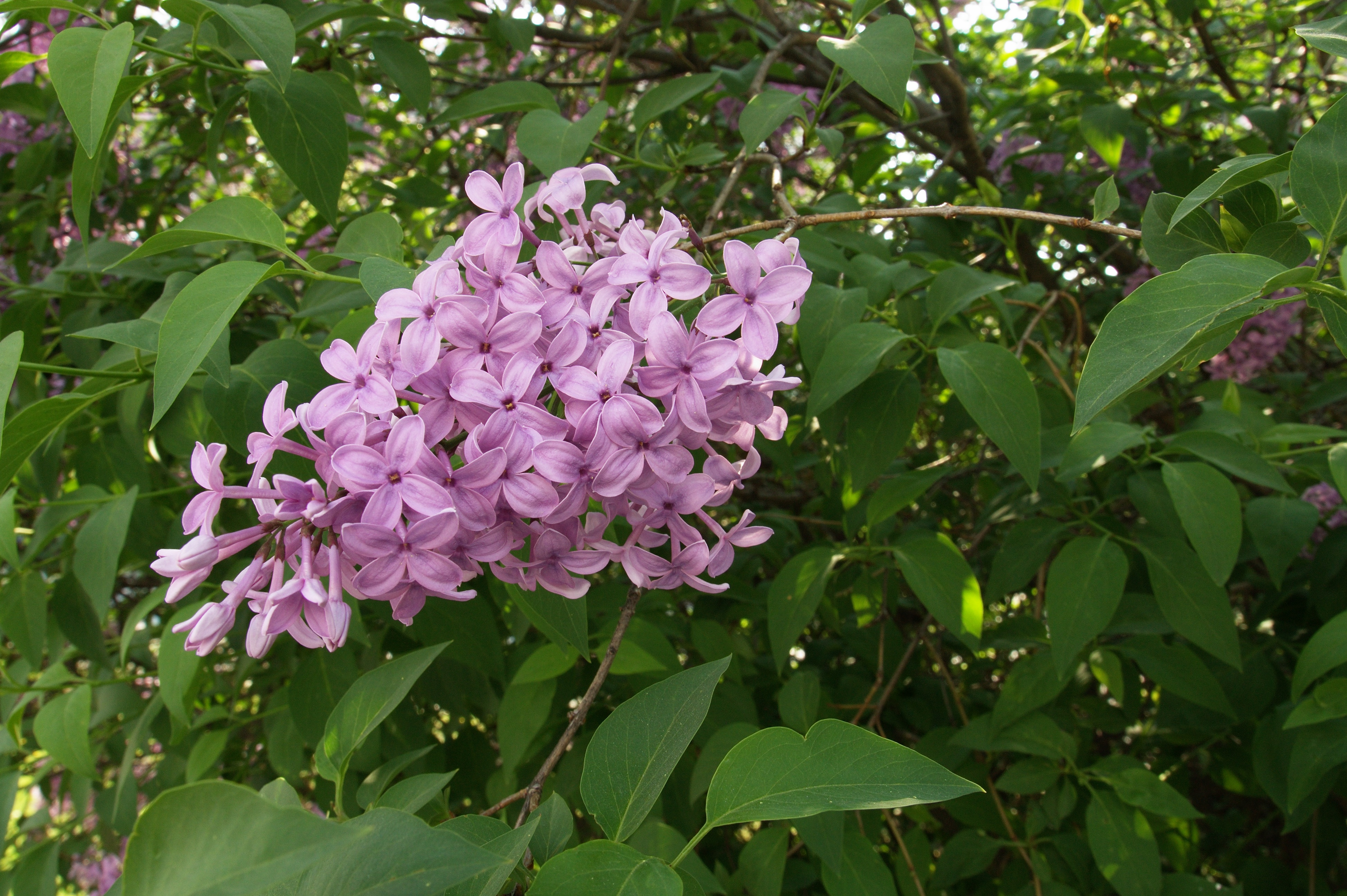
Syringa, lilac

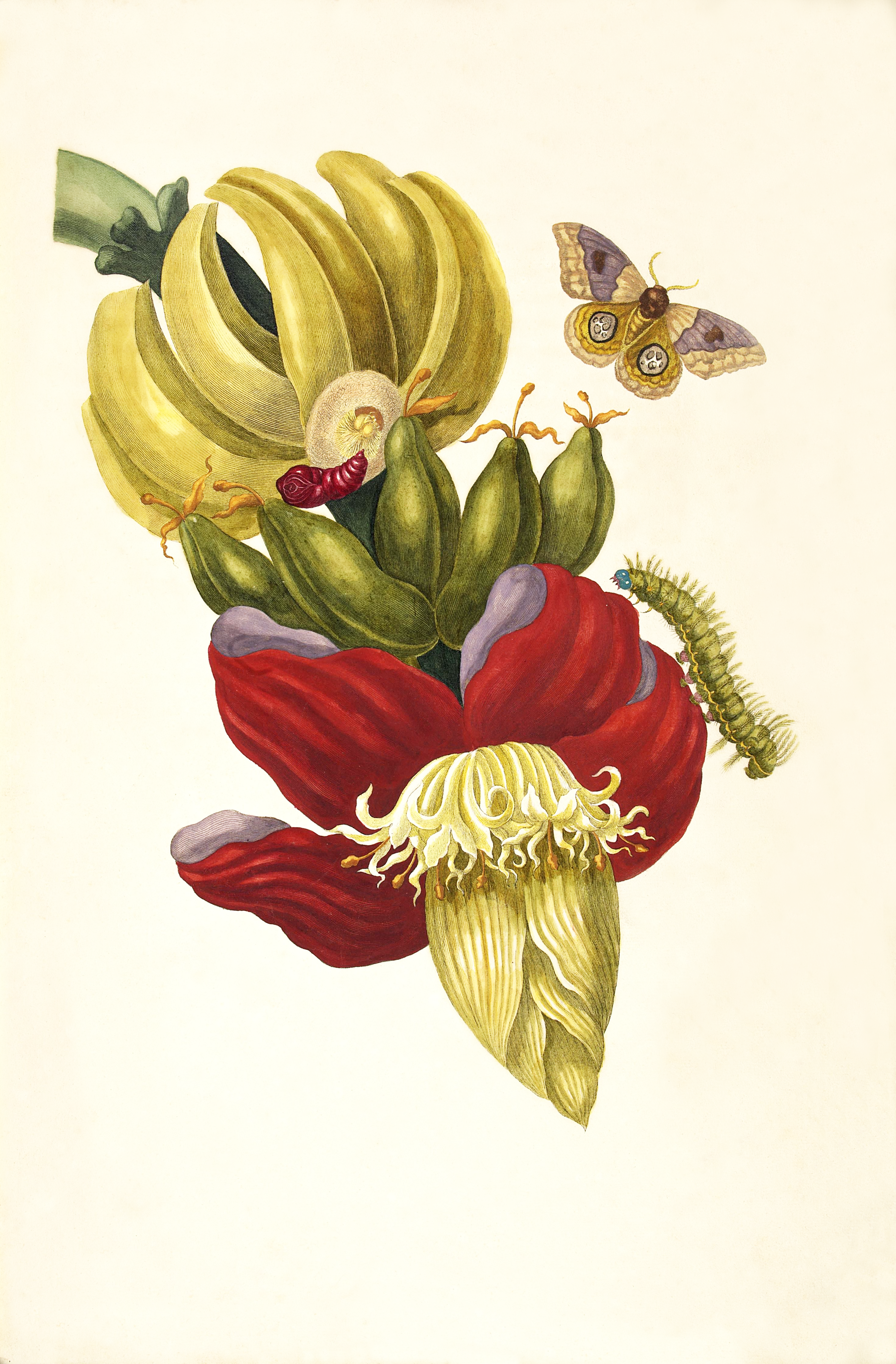
The thyrse of a banana plant has side branches which become hands of bananas

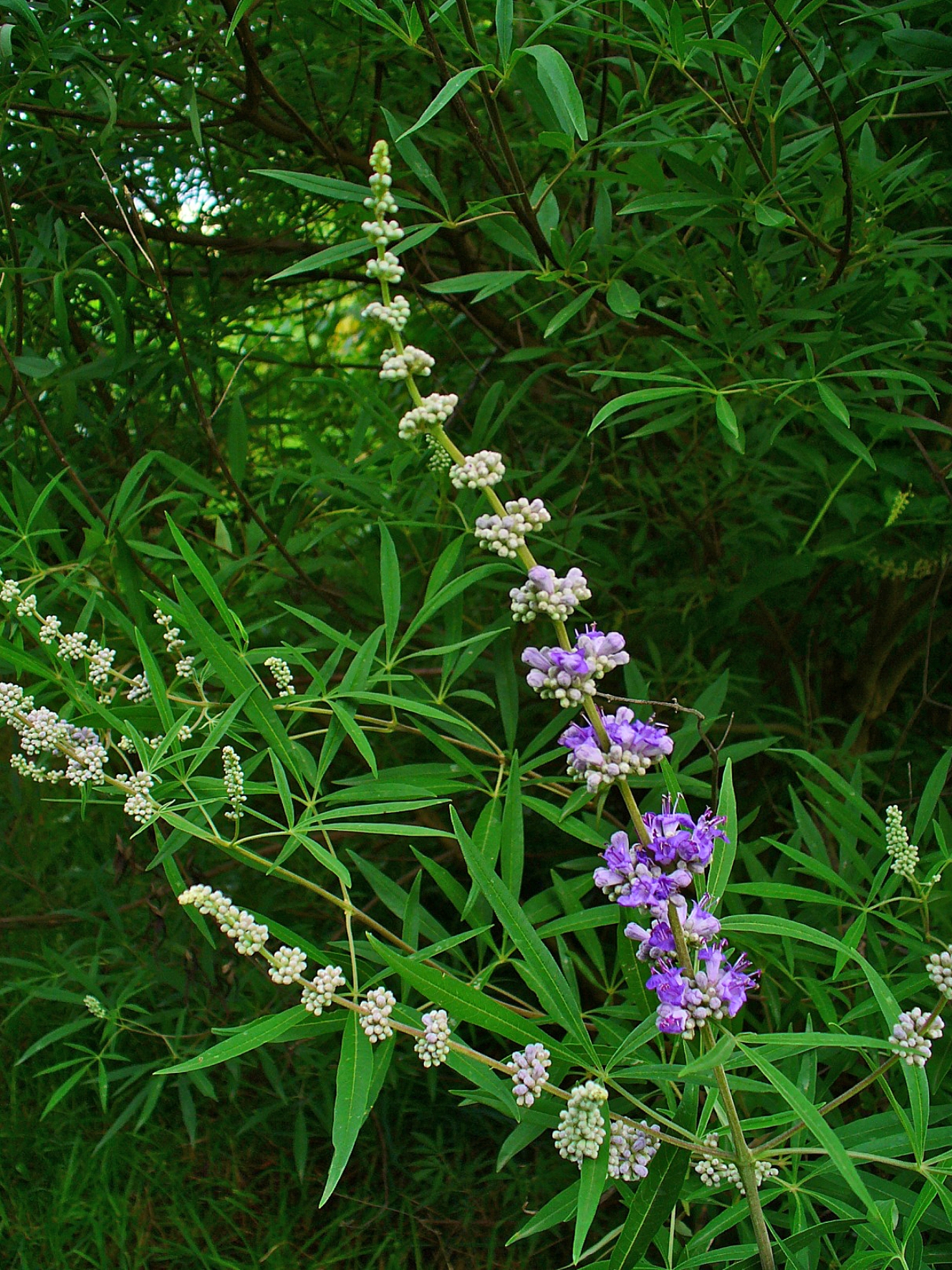
The inflorescence of Vitex agnus-castus has branches, each of which is a thyrse
