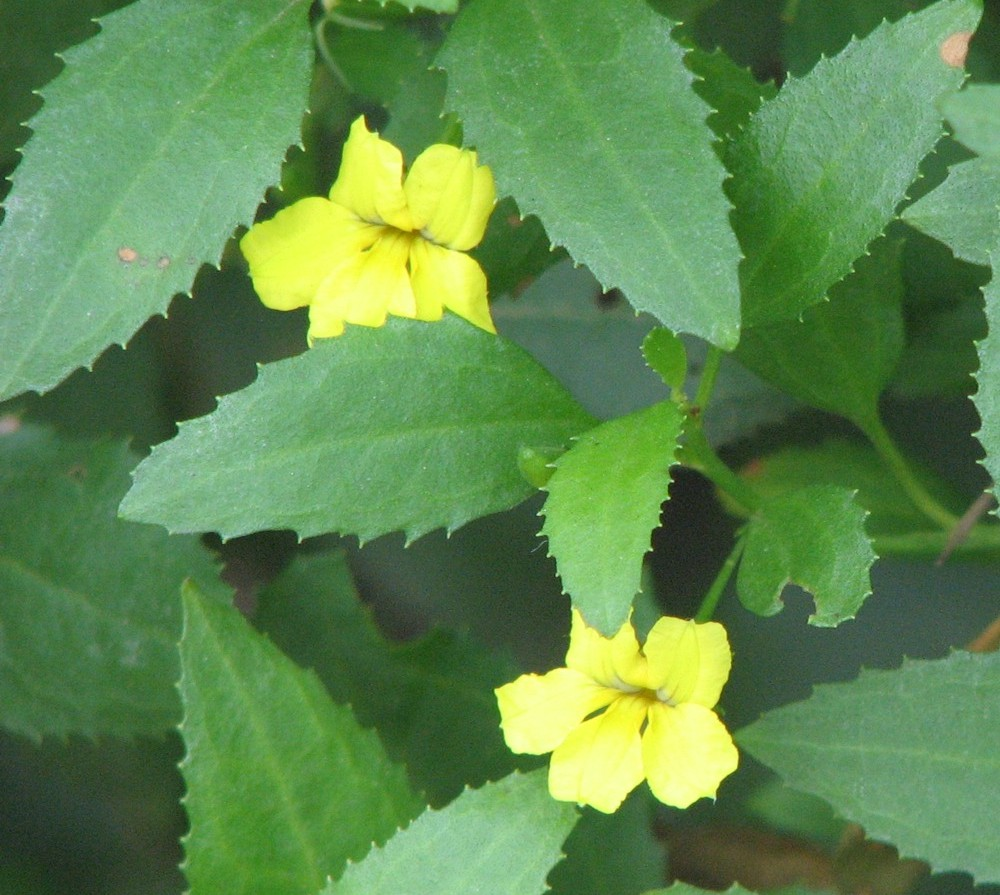
- Goodenia ovata

Scientific classification
- Kingdom: Plantae
- Clade: Tracheophytes
- Clade: Angiosperms
- Clade: Eudicots
- Clade: Asterids
- Order: Asterales
- Family: Goodeniaceae
- Genus: Goodenia; Sm.

Species
- About 200; See List of Goodenia species

Synonyms
- List: Aillya de Vriese; Antherostylis C.A.Gardner; Balingayum Blanco; Boutonia Steud. nom. inval., pro syn.; Calogyna T.Post & Kuntze orth. var.; Calogyne R.Br.; Catosperma Benth. orth. var.; Catospermum Benth.; Collema W.Anderson ex R.Br.; Distylis Gaudich.; Euthales R.Br.; Goodenia sect. Tetrathylax G.Don; Goodenia sect. Tetrathylax Carolin orth. var.; Goodenoughia Voss; Menoceras (R.Br.) Lindl.; Menoceras Steud.; Monochila Spach; Neogoodenia C.A.Gardner & A.S.George; Pentaptilon E.Pritz.; Picrophyta F.Muell; Selliera Cav.; Stekhovia de Vriese; Symphyobasis K.Krause; Tetraphylax de Vriese orth. var.; Tetrathylax (G.Don) de Vriese; Velleia Sm.; Verreauxia Benth.

= Goodenia =

Genus of flowering plants

Goodenia is a genus of about two hundred species of flowering plants in the family Goodeniaceae. Plants in this genus are herbs or shrubs, mostly endemic to Australia. The leaves are variably-shaped, the flowers arranged in small groups, with three or five sepals, the corolla bilaterally symmetrical and either fan-shaped with two "lips" or tube-shaped. The petals are usually yellow to white, the stamens free from each other and the fruit a capsule.

== Taxonomy ==
The genus Goodenia was first formally described in 1793 by James Edward Smith in his book A Specimen of the Botany of New Holland and the first species he described was G. ramosissima, now known as Scaevola ramosissima. The name Goodenia honours Bishop of Carlisle Samuel Goodenough, a member of the Linnean Society of London at the time.

=== Species list ===
See List of Goodenia species

== Distribution ==
Most species of Goodenia are endemic to Australia but G. konigsbergeri is endemic to Southeast Asia. G. armstrongiana, G. purpurascens and G. pumilio extend to New Guinea and G. pilosa extends to the Philippines. Species of Goodenia are found in all states, including in arid and semi-arid areas.
