= Roger Charles Carolin =

Australian botanist (1929–2025)

- Born: 15 October 1929; London, England
- Died: 3 February 2025 (aged 95); Jaspers Brush, New South Wales, Australia
- Education: University of Sydney (Ph.D. 1962)
- Scientific career
- Fields: Botany
- Workplaces: University of Sydney
- Author abbrev. (botany): Carolin

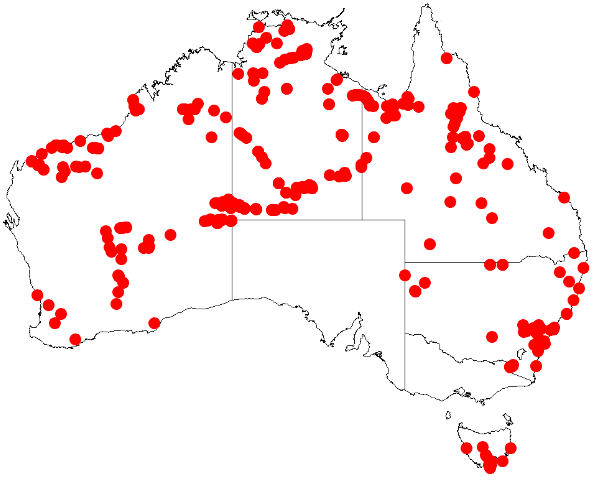
Collecting locations in Australia

Roger Charles Carolin (15 October 1929 – 3 February 2025) was an Australian botanist and pteridologist. He was appointed a lecturer in botany at the University of Sydney in 1955, earned a Ph.D. from there in 1962 with a thesis on the floral morphology of the campanales, and retired as an associate professor at the university in 1989.

Much of his research focused on the Campanulales, in particular the families Brunoniaceae and Goodeniaceae. He co-authored the Flora of the Sydney Region (various editions: 1972–1993), and served on the editorial committees for the Flora of Central Australia and the Flora of Australia. Carolin was the principal author of Flora of Australia Vol. 35. Brunoniaceae, Goodeniaceae (1992).

Carolin died on 3 February 2025, at the age of 95.

The standard author abbreviation Carolin is used to indicate this person as the author when citing a botanical name.

== Some plants authored ==
- Campanulaceae Isotoma luticola Carolin Telopea 2 1980
- Campanulaceae Wahlenbergia communis Carolin Proceedings of the Linnean Society of New South Wales 89 1965 (synonym of Wahlenbergia capillaris (G.Lodd.) G.Don
- Campanulaceae Wahlenbergia graniticola Carolin Proceedings of the Linnean Society of New South Wales 89 1965
- Campanulaceae Wahlenbergia planiflora P.J.Sm. subsp. longipila Carolin ex P.J.Sm. Telopea 5(1): 144. 1992
- Campanulaceae Wahlenbergia queenslandica Carolin ex P.J.Sm. Fl. S. Australia 3: 1381 (1986).
- Campanulaceae Wahlenbergia scopulicola Carolin ex P.J.Sm. Telopea 5(1): 111. 1992
- Geraniaceae Erodium angustilobum Carolin Proc. Linn. Soc. New South Wales 94: 212. 1970
- Geraniaceae Erodium angustilobum Carolin Proceedings of the Linnean Society of New South Wales 94 1969
- Geraniaceae Erodium aureum Carolin Proceedings of the Linnean Society of New South Wales 83 1958.

For a list of all plants authored by Carolin see International Plant Name Index.
See also Category:Taxa named by Roger Charles Carolin

== Some publications ==
=== Articles ===
- (1954) Carolin, R. C. (1954). "Stomatal Size, Density and Morphology in the Genus Dianthus". Kew Bulletin. 9 (2): 251–258. doi:10.2307/4114389. ISSN 0075-5974. JSTOR 4114389.
- (1957) Cytological and hybridization studies in the genus Dianthus. New Phytologist, 56(1), 81–97.
- (1960) Geraniaceae. Flora Malesiana-Series 1, Spermatophyta, 6(1), 445–449.
- (1964) Notes on the genus Erodium L'Her. Australia. Proceedings of the Linnean Society of New South Wales, 88: 313–319.
- (1965) The genus Geranium L. in the south western Pacific area. Proceedings of the Linnean Society of New South Wales, 89: 326–361.
- (1987) Carolin, R. (1987). "A Review of the Family Portulacaceae". Australian Journal of Botany. 35 (4): 383. doi:10.1071/BT9870383. ISSN 0067-1924.
- (1987) "Notes on Portulacaceae from Argentina. Parodiana 3 (2): 329–332
- (1990) "Nomenclatural notes and new taxa in the genus Goodenia (Goodeniaceae)". Telopea 3(4) : 517–570.

=== Books ===
- Beadle, NCW, OD Evans, RC Carolin. (1962) Handbook of the vascular plants of the Sydney district and Blue Mountains. Armidale, New South Wales, Brown Gem Print. 597 pp.
- Beadle, NCW, OD Evans, RC Carolin. (1982) Flora of the Sydney region. Reed, Frenchs Forest. 720 pp. 16 pp. of plates: ill. (some col. ), maps
- Pellow, B.J., Henwood, M.J. Carolin, R.C. (2009) Flora of the Sydney Region, 5th Ed. A complete revision, Sydney University Press. ISBN 9781920899301
- Carolin, RC, P Clarke. (1991) Beach plants of south eastern Australia. Sainty & Associates, Potts Point, NSW, Australia. 119 pp. ISBN 0-646-05147-4
- (1992) Brunoniaceae, Goodeniaceae. Flora of Australia Series, Vol 35. ISBN 0-644-14553-6
- (2002) Encyclopedia of Discovery:Nature. 11 chapters. ISBN 1-876778-93-8
- Dow, L. (1997) Incredible plants. McGraw Hill. consulting editor: Roger Carolin ISBN 970-10-4157-7
- (1981) Salt lakes & coolabahs : field trip 23, (30 August – 18 September) / leader: Roger Carolin
