= Velleia =

Genus of flowering plants

Velleia is a historically recognised genus of about 30 species of herbs in the family Goodeniaceae.

The genus was first described in 1798 by James Edward Smith in Transactions of the Linnean Society of London. The genus was named after Thomas Velley.

Plants of the World Online considers Velleia to be a synonym of Goodenia. As of March 2024, all the species in the list below are now considered to be included in Goodenia.

== Species ==
Species of Velleia included:

- Velleia arguta R.Br. (now known as Goodenia arguta)
- Velleia connata F.Muell. (now known as Goodenia connata)
- Velleia cusackiana F.Muell. (now known as Goodenia cusackiana)
- Velleia cycnopotamica F.Muell. (now known as Goodenia cycnopotamica)
- Velleia daviesii F.Muell. (now known as Goodenia daviesii)
- Velleia dichotoma DC. (now known as Goodenia caroliniana)
- Velleia discophora F.Muell. (now known as Goodenia discophora)
- Velleia exigua (F.Muell.) Carolin (now known as Goodenia exigua)
- Velleia foliosa (Benth.) K.Krause (now known as Goodenia brendannarum)
- Velleia glabrata Carolin (now known as Goodenia glabrata)
- Velleia helmsii K.Krause (now known as Goodenia connata)
- Velleia hispida W.Fitzg. (now known as Goodenia capillosa)
- Velleia lanceolata Lindl. (now known as Goodenia filiformis)
- Velleia lyrata R.Br. (now known as Goodenia caroliniana)
- Velleia macrocalyx (de Vriese) C.Chr. & Ostenf. (now known as Goodenia macrocalyx)
- Velleia macrophylla (Lindl.) Benth. (now known as Goodenia macrophylla)
- Velleia macroplectra F.Muell. (now known as Goodenia macroplectra)
- Velleia montana Hook.f. (now known as Goodenia montana)
- Velleia panduriformis Benth. (now known as Goodenia panduriformis)
- Velleia paradoxa R.Br. (now known as Goodenia paradoxa)
- Velleia parvisepta Carolin (now known as Goodenia parvisepta)
- Velleia perfoliata R.Br. (now known as Goodenia perfoliata)
- Velleia pilosella (de Vriese) C.Chr. & Ostenf. (now known as Goodenia trinervis)
- Velleia prostrata W.Fitzg. (now known as Goodenia macrocalyx)
- Velleia pubescens Ewart & L.R.Kerr (now known as Goodenia subsolana)
- Velleia rosea S.Moore (now known as Goodenia rosea)
- Velleia salmoniana F.Muell. (now known as Goodenia salmoniana)
- Velleia spathulata R.Br. (now known as Goodenia mystrophylla)
- Velleia trinervis Labill. (now known as Goodenia trinervis)
