= Goodenia micrantha =

Scientific classification
- Kingdom: Plantae
- Clade: Tracheophytes
- Clade: Angiosperms
- Clade: Eudicots
- Clade: Asterids
- Order: Asterales
- Family: Goodeniaceae
- Genus: Goodenia
- Species: G. micrantha

Binomial name
- Goodenia micrantha Hemsl. ex Carolin

Species of plant

Goodenia micrantha is a species of flowering plant in the family Goodeniaceae and is endemic to south-western Australia. It is a prostrate to ascending herb with linear leaves at the base of the plant and racemes of small, yellowish flowers with a brownish centre.

== Description ==
Goodenia micrantha is a prostrate to ascending herb with four-sided stems up to 25 cm (9.8 in) long. The leaves are arranged at the base of the plant and are linear, 10–50 mm (0.39–1.97 in) long and 0.4–1 mm (0.016–0.039 in) wide. The flowers are arranged in racemes up to 250 mm (9.8 in) long, with leaf-like bracts, each flower on a pedicel 8–15 mm (0.31–0.59 in) long. The sepals are oblong to lance-shaped, about 1 mm (0.039 in) long, the petals yellowish with a brownish centre and 1.5–2.5 mm (0.059–0.098 in) long. The lower lobes of the corolla are 1 mm (0.039 in) long with wings about 0.1–0.2 mm (0.0039–0.0079 in) wide. Flowering mainly occurs from September to December and the fruit is a more or less spherical capsule 2.5–3 mm (0.098–0.118 in) in diameter.

== Taxonomy and naming ==
This goodenia was described in 1874 by Ferdinand von Mueller in Fragmenta Phytographiae Australiae as a variety of Goodenia filiformis, but was not given a varietal name. In 1912, Kurt Krause gave the variety the name Goodenia filiformis var. minutiflora in Adolf Engler's Das Pflanzenreich, meaning that this was the first valid, formal description of the variety. In 1921, Carl Christensen and Carl Hansen Ostenfeld raised von Mueller's variety to species status as Goodenia micrantha, but that name was not valid, because the original variety was not named. The name Goodenia micrantha was first formally published in 1990 by Roger Charles Carolin in the journal Telopea, from an unpublished manuscript of the English botanist William Hensley. The specific epithet (micrantha) means "small-flowered".

== Distribution and habitat ==
This goodenia grows in winter-wet depressions and on granite outcrops. It is widespread in scattered populations in the south-west of Western Australia. A single small population has also been recorded from the western end of Kangaroo Island in South Australia.

== Conservation status ==
Goodenia micrantha is classified as "not threatened" by the Government of Western Australia Department of Parks and Wildlife.
