= Euthales =

Euthales may refer to:

- An algae genus, now a synonym of Velleia
- A noctuid moth genus, now a synonym of Cryphia
