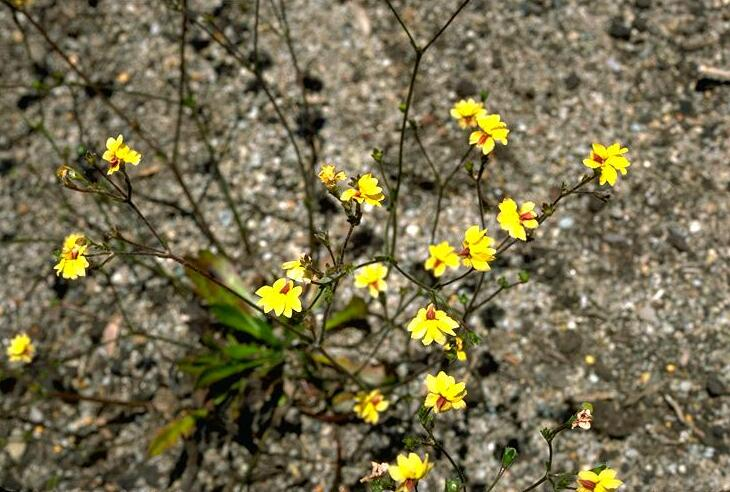
- In the Australian National Botanic Gardens

Scientific classification
- Kingdom: Plantae
- Clade: Tracheophytes
- Clade: Angiosperms
- Clade: Eudicots
- Clade: Asterids
- Order: Asterales
- Family: Goodeniaceae
- Genus: Goodenia
- Species: G. trinervis

Binomial name
- Goodenia trinervis (de Vriese) K.A.Sheph.
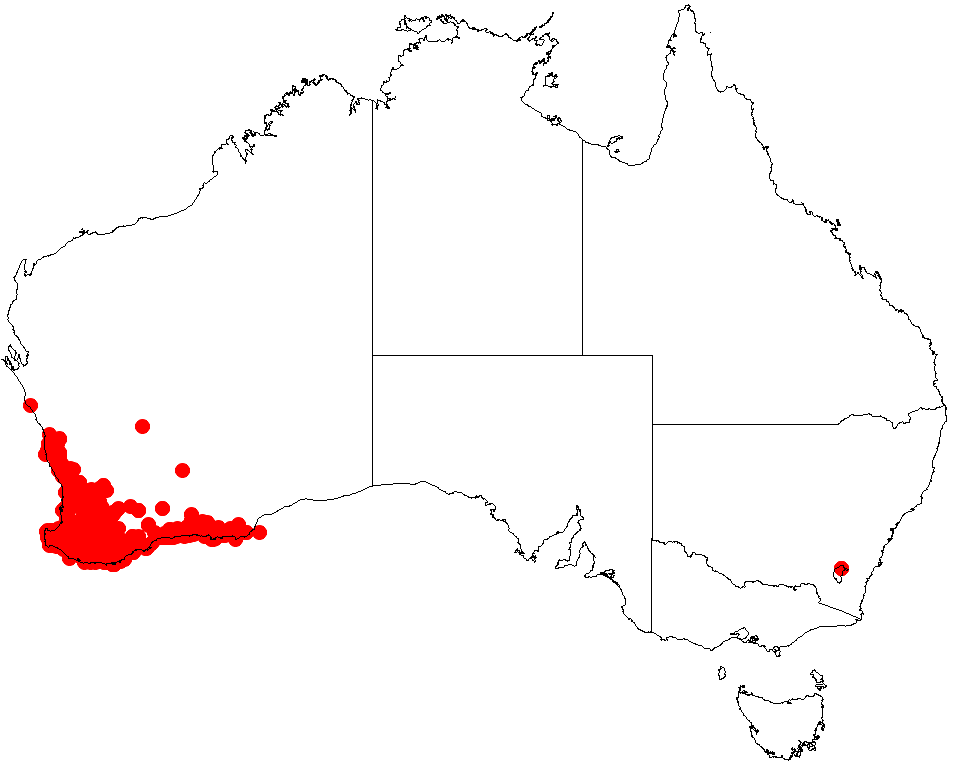
- Occurrence data from AVH

Synonyms
- Euthales trinervis (Labill.) R.Br.; Goodenia tenella Andrews nom. illeg.; Velleia trinervis Labill.; Euthales filiformis de Vriese; Euthales pilosella de Vriese; Velleia pilosella (de Vriese) C.Chr. & Ostenf.; Velleia trinervis var. lanuginosa E.Pritz.; Velleia trinervis var. villosa Benth.

= Goodenia trinervis =

Species of plant

Goodenia trinervis is a species of flowering plant in the family Goodeniaceae and is endemic to the south-west of Western Australia. It is a perennial herb with linear to spoon-shaped leaves at the base of the plant, yellow flowers on an ascending flower stem, and oval fruit.

== Description ==
Goodenia trinervis is a perennial herb with linear to spoon-shaped leaves at the base of the plant, 50–200 mm (2.0–7.9 in) long and 5–25 mm (0.20–0.98 in) wide, sometimes with toothed edges. The flowers are arranged on an ascending peduncle up to 400 mm (16 in) tall, with oblong to linear bracteoles up to 19 mm (0.75 in) long. The sepals are D-shaped to egg-shaped, 2.0–2.5 mm (0.079–0.098 in) long and the petals are yellowish-orange, 8–12 mm (0.31–0.47 in) long and reddish-brown in the throat. The fruit is an oval capsule 7 mm (0.28 in) long and 4 mm (0.16 in) wide containing spherical seeds about 2 mm (0.079 in) in diameter.

== Taxonomy and naming ==
This species was first formally described in 1805 by Jacques Labillardière who gave it the name Velleia trinervis in his Novae Hollandiae Plantarum Specimen. In 2020, Kelly Anne Shepherd transferred the species to Goodenia as G. trinervis in the journal PhytoKeys. The specific epithet trinervis means "three-nerved", referring to the leaves.

== Distribution and habitat ==
This goodenia often grows in damp places and occurs from north of Perth to near Esperance in the Avon Wheatbelt, Coolgardie, Esperance Plains, Geraldton Sandplains, Jarrah Forest, Mallee, Swan Coastal Plain and Warren bioregions of south-western Western Australia.

== Conservation status ==
Goodenia trinervis is classified as "not threatened" by the Western Australian Government Department of Parks and Wildlife.
