= Goodenia capillosa =

Scientific classification
- Kingdom: Plantae
- Clade: Tracheophytes
- Clade: Angiosperms
- Clade: Eudicots
- Clade: Asterids
- Order: Asterales
- Family: Goodeniaceae
- Genus: Goodenia
- Species: G. capillosa

Binomial name
- Goodenia capillosa (Carolin) K.A.Sheph.
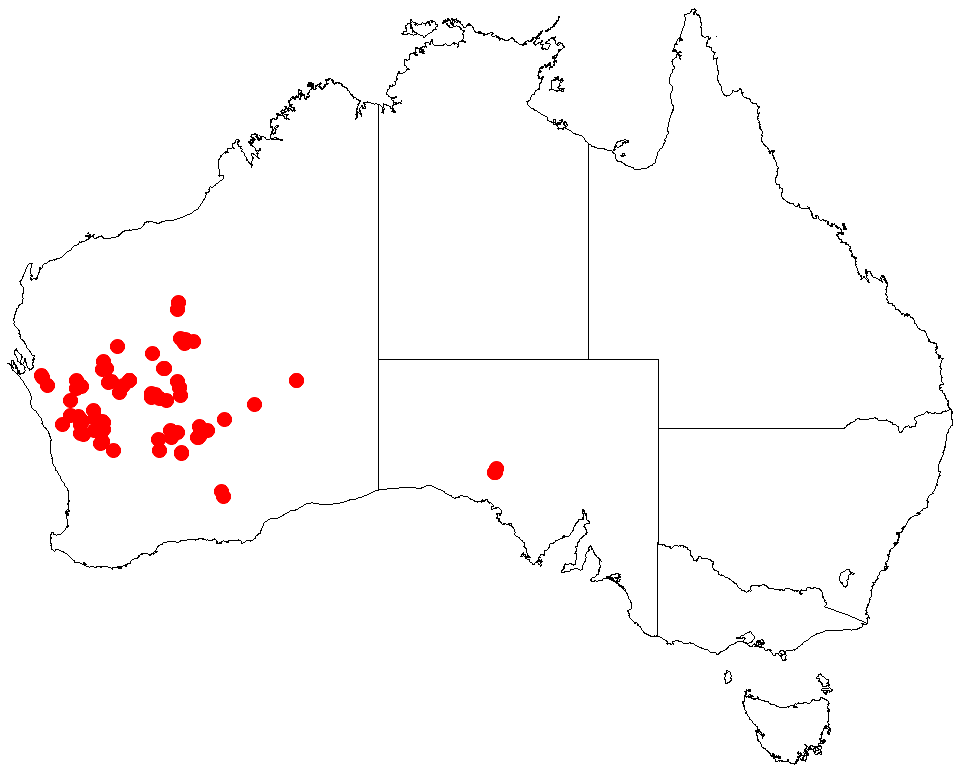
- Occurrence data for Goodenia capillosa from AVH

Synonyms
- Velleia hispida W.Fitzg.

Species of plant

Goodenia capillosa, commonly known as hispid velleia, is a species of flowering plant in the family Goodeniaceae and is native to inland areas of Western Australia and South Australia. It is an annual herb with covered with soft hairs, and has narrowly egg-shaped to narrowly elliptic leaves with toothed or lyre-shaped edges, and yellow flowers.

== Description ==
Goodenia capillosa is an annual herb with erect stems up to 16 cm (6.3 in) long. Its leaves are narrowly egg-shaped with the narrower end towards the base, or narrowly elliptic, 50–80 mm (2.0–3.1 in) long and 12–20 mm (0.47–0.79 in) wide with toothed to lyre-shaped edges. The flowers are yellow with bracteoles up to 20 mm (0.79 in) long with the lower sepal 5 mm (0.20 in) long. The petals wings are about half as long as the lower sepal. Flowering mainly occurs from July to November and the fruit is a more or less spherical capsule containing seeds about 2.5 mm (0.098 in) in diameter with wings about 0.5 mm (0.020 in) wide.

== Taxonomy ==
This species was first formally described in 1904 by William Vincent Fitzgerald who gave it the name Velleia hispida in the Journal of the West Australian Natural History Society. In 2020, Kelly Anne Shepherd transferred it to the genus Goodenia. As the name Goodenia hispida (now known as Goodenia auriculata) was unavailable, the new species was given the name G. capillosa in the journal PhytoKeys.

== Distribution ==
Goodenia capillosa grows in drier communities from near Laverton to Meekatharra and the Great Victoria Desert, in the Avon Wheatbelt, Coolgardie, Gascoyne, Geraldton Sandplains, Great Victoria Desert, Little Sandy Desert, Murchison and Yalgoo of Western Australia and in the Yellabinna Wilderness Protection Area in South Australia.
