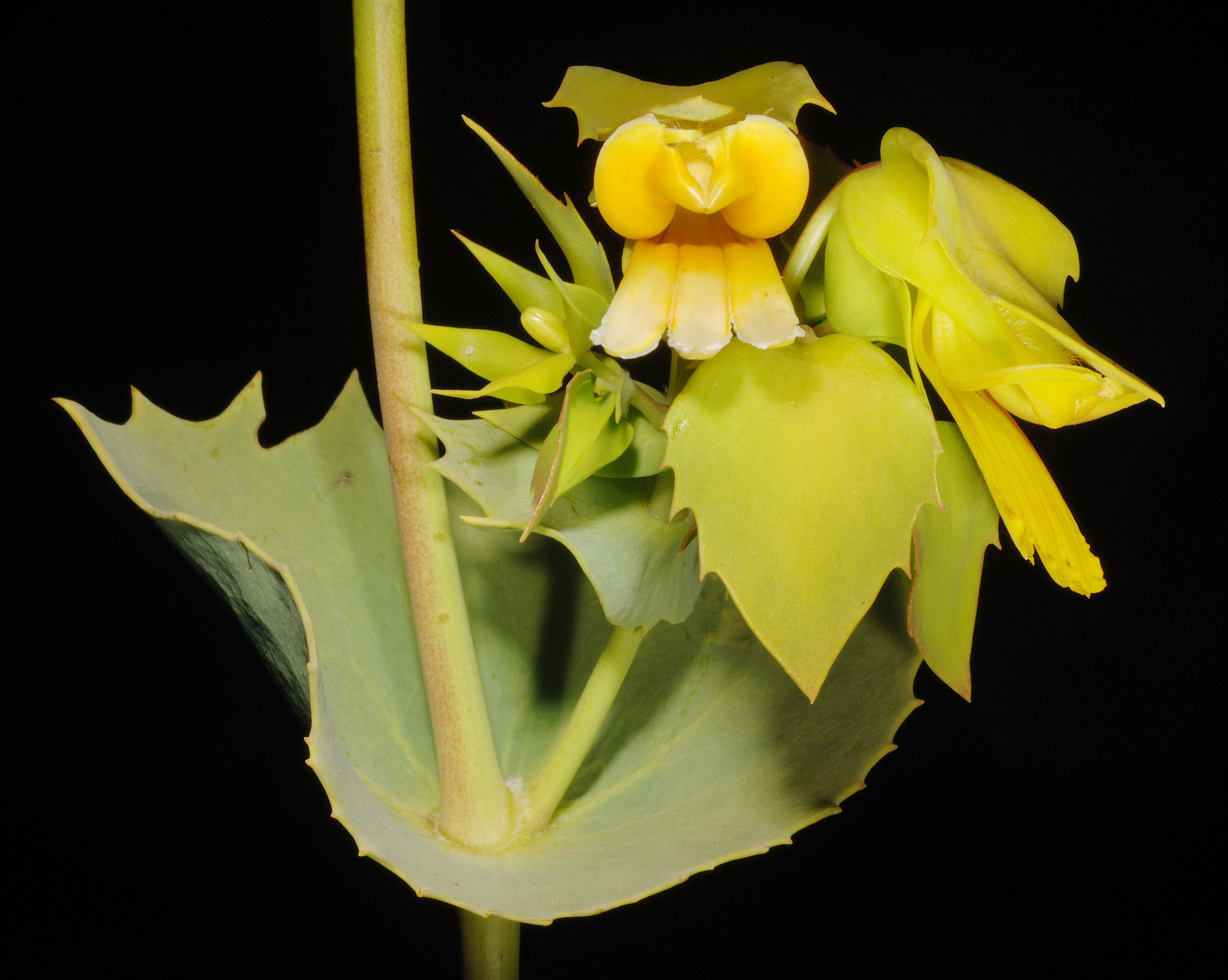

Scientific classification
- Kingdom: Plantae
- Clade: Tracheophytes
- Clade: Angiosperms
- Clade: Eudicots
- Clade: Asterids
- Order: Asterales
- Family: Goodeniaceae
- Genus: Goodenia
- Species: G. panduriformis

Binomial name
- Goodenia panduriformis (A.Cunn. ex Benth.) K.A.Sheph.
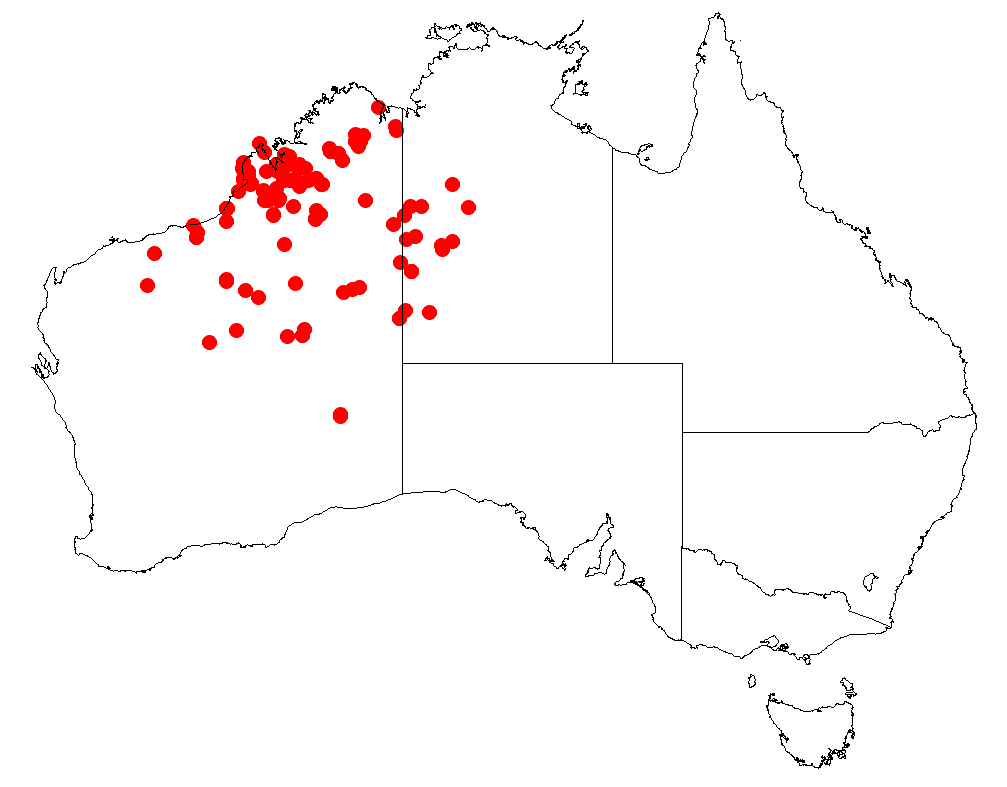
- Occurrence data from AVH

Synonyms
- Velleia panduriformis A.Cunn. ex Benth.

= Goodenia panduriformis =

Pindan poison

Species of flowering plant

Goodenia panduriformis, commonly known as Pindan poison, is a species of flowering plant in the family Goodeniaceae and is endemic to north-western Australia. It is a glaucous herb with erect flower stems, glabrous, toothed, egg-shaped leaves with the narrower end towards the base, bracteoles joined to form a large disc, and deep- or brownish-yellow flowers.

== Description ==
Goodenia panduriformis is a glaucous herb with egg-shaped leaves, the narrower end towards the base, up to 200 mm (7.9 in) long and 70 mm (2.8 in) wide with toothed edges. The flowers are borne on a flowering stem up to 1 m (3 ft 3 in) tall with bracteoles joined to form a funnel-like disc up to 120 mm (4.7 in) wide, often split down one side. The sepals are more or less free from each other, the lower sepal broadly elliptic and 15–18 mm (0.59–0.71 in) long. The petals are 20–25 mm (0.79–0.98 in) long, covered with soft hairs on the outside and bearded inside and deep- or brownish-yellow, the wings up to 1 mm (0.039 in) wide. Flowering mainly occurs from April to September and the capsule is oval, containing a round seed 8–9 mm (0.31–0.35 in) in diameter with a wings about 2 mm (0.079 in) wide.

== Taxonomy and naming ==
This species was first formally described in 1868 by George Bentham in his Flora Australiensis, who gave it the name Velleia panduriformis from an unpublished description by Allan Cunningham. In 2020, Kelly Anne Shepherd transferred the species to Goodenia as G. panduriformis in the journal PhytoKeys. The specific epithet panduriformis means lute- or fiddle-shaped.

== Distribution and habitat ==
Pindan poison occurs in the Central Kimberley, Dampierland, Great Sandy Desert, Northern Kimberley and Victoria Bonaparte bioregions of northern Western Australia and in the east of the Northern Territory, where it grows in red sand in open shrubland and low woodland.
