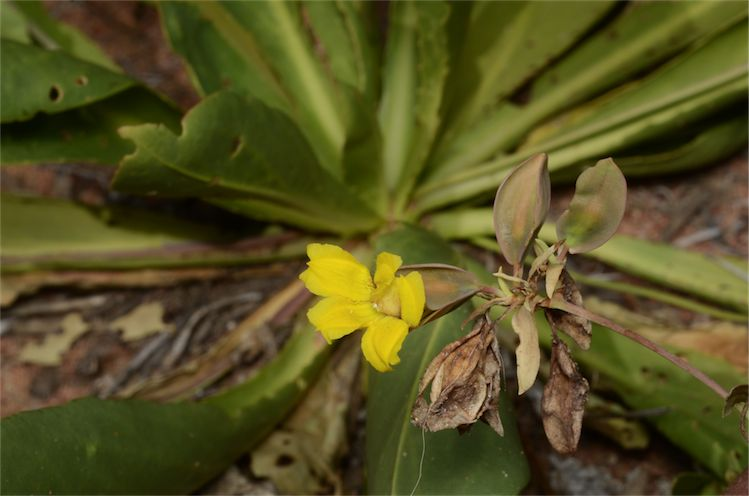
- In Welford National Park

Scientific classification
- Kingdom: Plantae
- Clade: Tracheophytes
- Clade: Angiosperms
- Clade: Eudicots
- Clade: Asterids
- Order: Asterales
- Family: Goodeniaceae
- Genus: Goodenia
- Species: G. macrocalyx

Binomial name
- Goodenia macrocalyx (de Vriese) K.A.Sheph.

Synonyms
- Velleia macrocalyx de Vriese; Velleia prostrata Ewart & L.R.Kerr

= Goodenia macrocalyx =

Species of plant

Goodenia macrocalyx is a species of flowering plant in the family Goodeniaceae and is endemic to north-eastern Australia. It is a glabrous, perennial herb with elliptic to narrowly egg-shaped leaves at the base of the plant, yellow flowers and narrowly oval fruit.

== Description ==
Goodenia macrocalyx is a glabrous perennial herb with elliptic to narrowly egg-shaped leaves at the base of the plant, 50–150 mm (2.0–5.9 in) long and 20–40 mm (0.79–1.57 in) wide, sometimes toothed near the base, on a petiole 5–15 mm (0.20–0.59 in) long. The flowers are arranged on a peduncle up to 350 mm (14 in) long, with linear to elliptic bracteoles] 5–40 mm (0.20–1.57 in) long and 1–25 mm (0.039–0.984 in) wide. The sepals are elliptic to egg-shaped, 12 mm (0.47 in) long and the petals are yellow, 10–12 mm (0.39–0.47 in) long and hairy on the outer surface. The lower lobes of the corolla are 3–4 mm (0.12–0.16 in) long. The fruit is a narrowly oval capsule 7–8 mm (0.28–0.31 in) long containing broadly elliptic seeds 1.5 mm (0.059 in) wide.

== Taxonomy and naming ==
This species was first formally described in 1848 by Willem Hendrik de Vriese who gave it the name Velleia macrocalyx in Thomas Mitchell's Journal of an Expedition into the Interior of Tropical Australia. In 2020, Kelly Anne Shepherd transferred the species to Goodenia as G. macrocalyx in the journal PhytoKeys. The specific epithet macrocalyx means "large sepals".

== Distribution and habitat ==
This goodenia grows in woodland and grassland in the Northern Territory and in Queensland from the Barkly Tableland and Sandover River to the Burdekin River.

== Conservation status ==
Goodenia macrocalyx is classified as of "least concern" under the Queensland Government Nature Conservation Act 1992 and the Northern Territory Government Territory Parks and Wildlife Conservation Act 1976.
