= Goodenia subsolana =

Scientific classification
- Kingdom: Plantae
- Clade: Tracheophytes
- Clade: Angiosperms
- Clade: Eudicots
- Clade: Asterids
- Order: Asterales
- Family: Goodeniaceae
- Genus: Goodenia
- Species: G. subsolana

Binomial name
- Goodenia subsolana K.A.Sheph.
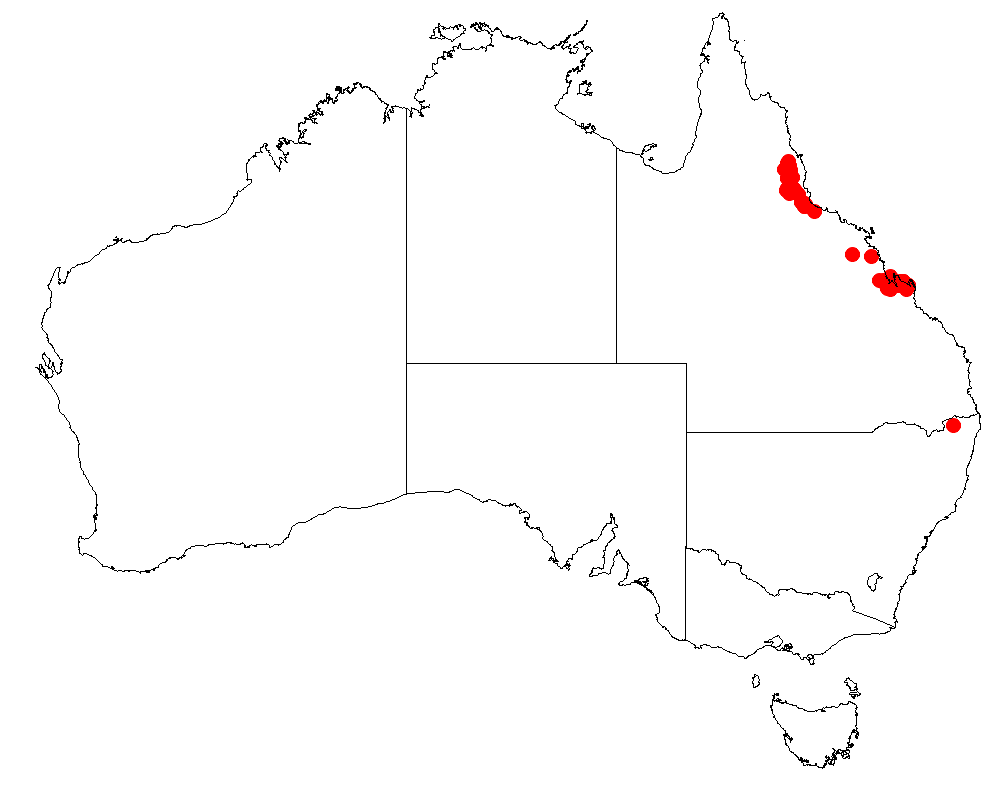
- Occurrence data from AVH

Synonyms
- Velleia pubescens R.Br.

Species of plant

Goodenia subsolana is a species of flowering plant in the family Goodeniaceae and is endemic to Queensland. It is a perennial herb with toothed, lance-shaped leaves, yellow flowers on an ascending to low-lying flower stem, and more or less spherical fruit containing round to elliptic seeds.

== Description ==
Goodenia subsolana is a perennial herb with toothed, lance-shaped leaves with the narrower end towards the base, 50–120 mm (2.0–4.7 in) long and up to 25 mm (0.98 in) wide. The flowers are arranged on an ascending to low-lying flowering stem up to 150 mm (5.9 in) tall, with bracteoles up to 3 mm (0.12 in) long and free from each other. The lower sepal is egg-shaped to elliptic, sometimes heart-shaped, 5–11 mm (0.20–0.43 in) long and the petals are yellowish, about 14 mm (0.55 in) long, with wings about 1 mm (0.039 in) wide and attached to the base of the lower sepal. The fruit is a more or less spherical capsule containing spherical to elliptic seeds about 2 mm (0.079 in) in diameter.

== Taxonomy and naming ==
This species was first formally described in 1810 by Robert Brown who gave it the name Velleia pubescens in his Prodromus Florae Novae Hollandiae et Insulae Van Diemen. In 2020, Kelly Anne Shepherd and others transferred it to the genus Goodenia but the name G. pubescens was unavailable as it was preoccupied by a species described by Sieber ex Spreng., now known as Scaevola albida. Shepherd named the new species G. subsolana. The specific apithet (subsolana) means "eastern-oriental", referring to the distribution of this species near coastal habitats of Queensland, in eastern Australia.

== Distribution ==
Goodenia subsolana is found near Shoalwater Bay and around Herberton in eastern Queensland.
