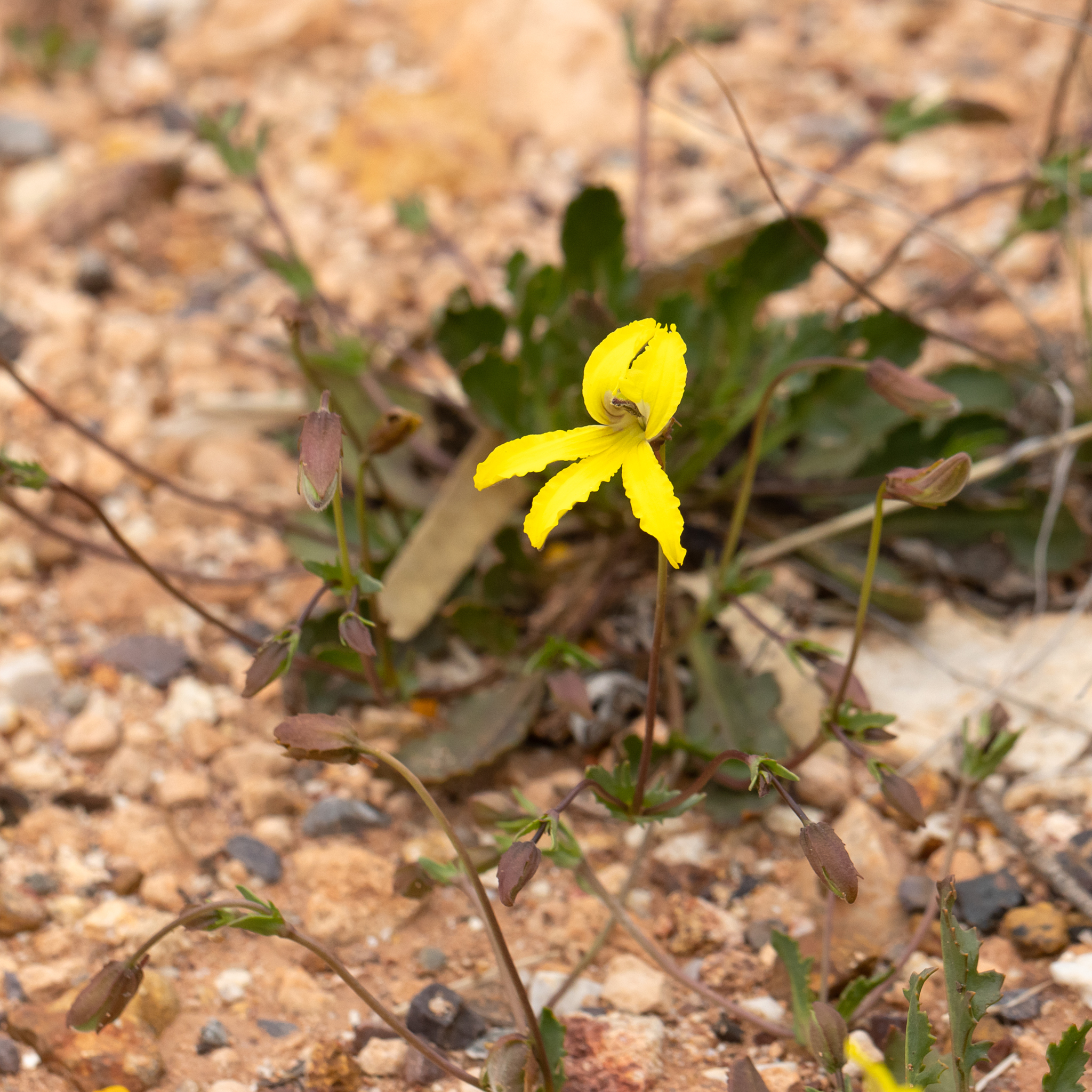
- Goodenia arguta near Lake Gilles

Scientific classification
- Kingdom: Plantae
- Clade: Tracheophytes
- Clade: Angiosperms
- Clade: Eudicots
- Clade: Asterids
- Order: Asterales
- Family: Goodeniaceae
- Genus: Goodenia
- Species: G. arguta

Binomial name
- Goodenia arguta (R.Br.) K.A.Sheph.
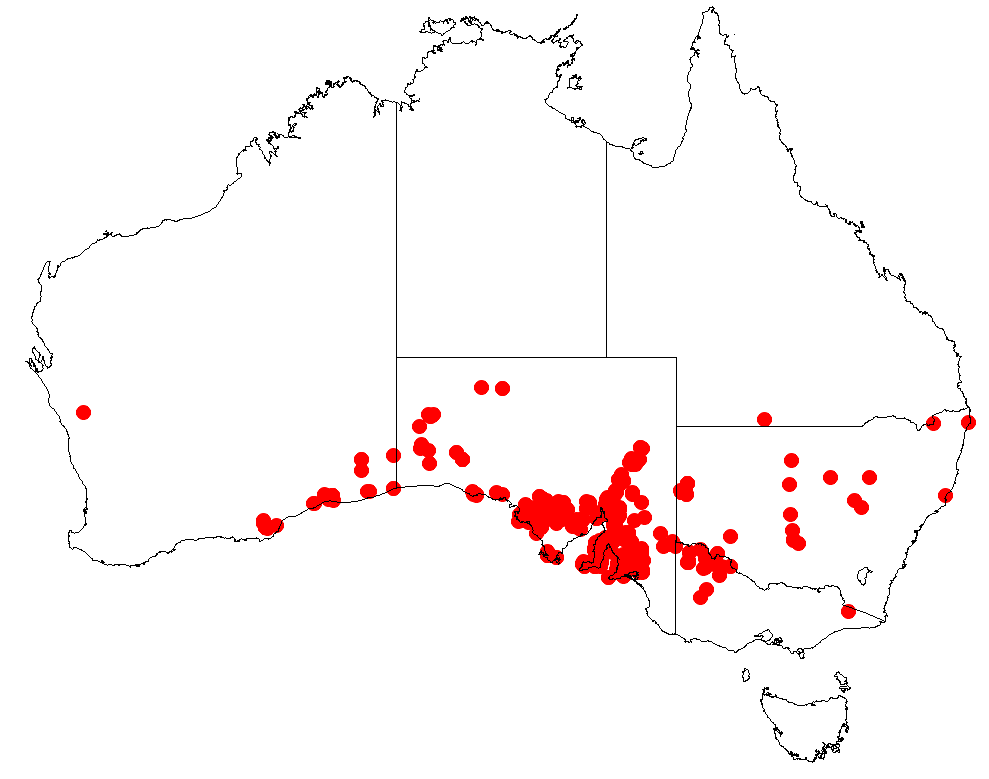
- Occurrence data from AVH

Synonyms
- Velleia arguta R.Br.; Antherostylis calcarata C.A.Gardner

= Goodenia arguta =

Spur velleia

Species of plant

Goodenia arguta, commonly known as spur velleia, or grassland goodenia, is a species of flowering plant in the family Goodeniaceae and endemic to continental Australia. It is a glabrous perennial with a rosette of leaves at the base of the plant and ascending flowering stems with deep yellow flowers.

== Description ==
Goodenia arguta is a glabrous perennial with a rosette of leaves at the base of the plant and ascending flowering stems up to 40 cm (16 in) high. The leaves are lance-shaped with the narrower end towards the base to narrowly elliptic, 40–120 mm (1.6–4.7 in) long and 5–12 mm (0.20–0.47 in) wide with toothed or lobed edges. The flowers are arranged in clusters with lance-shaped to egg-shaped, toothed or lobed bracteoles 10–30 mm (0.39–1.18 in) long at the base. The 5 sepals are 8–12 mm (0.31–0.47 in) long and the petals are deep yellow, 12–22 mm (0.47–0.87 in) long with wings 1.0–1.5 mm (0.039–0.059 in) wide. Flowering mainly occurs from September to January and the fruit is an oval capsule 6–9 mm (0.24–0.35 in) long.

== Taxonomy and naming ==
This species was first formally described in 1810 by Robert Brown who gave it the name Velleia arguta in his Prodromus Florae Novae Hollandiae et Insulae Van Diemen. The specific epithet (arguta) means "sharply toothed", referring to the leaves.

In 2020, Kelly Anne Shepherd transferred the species to Goodenia as G. arguta in the journal PhytoKeys.

== Distribution and habitat ==
Spur velleia usually grows in mallee or grassland and rocky sites, in all states of Australia, except Tasmania and the Northern Territory.
