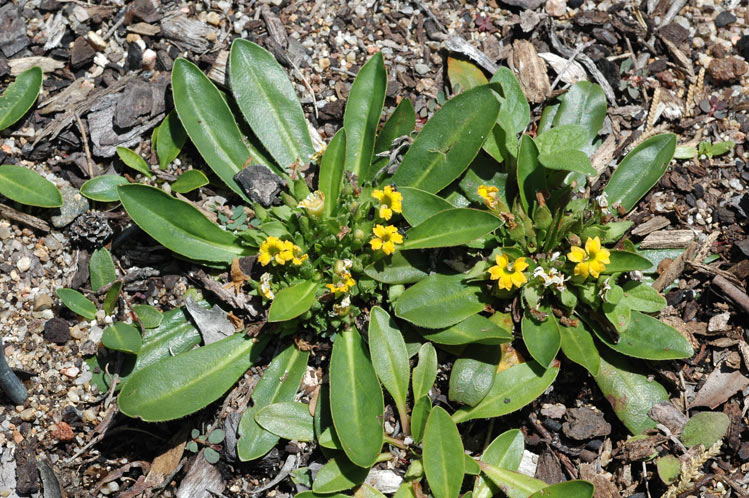

Scientific classification
- Kingdom: Plantae
- Clade: Tracheophytes
- Clade: Angiosperms
- Clade: Eudicots
- Clade: Asterids
- Order: Asterales
- Family: Goodeniaceae
- Genus: Goodenia
- Species: G. montana

Binomial name
- Goodenia montana (Hook.f.) K.A.Sheph.
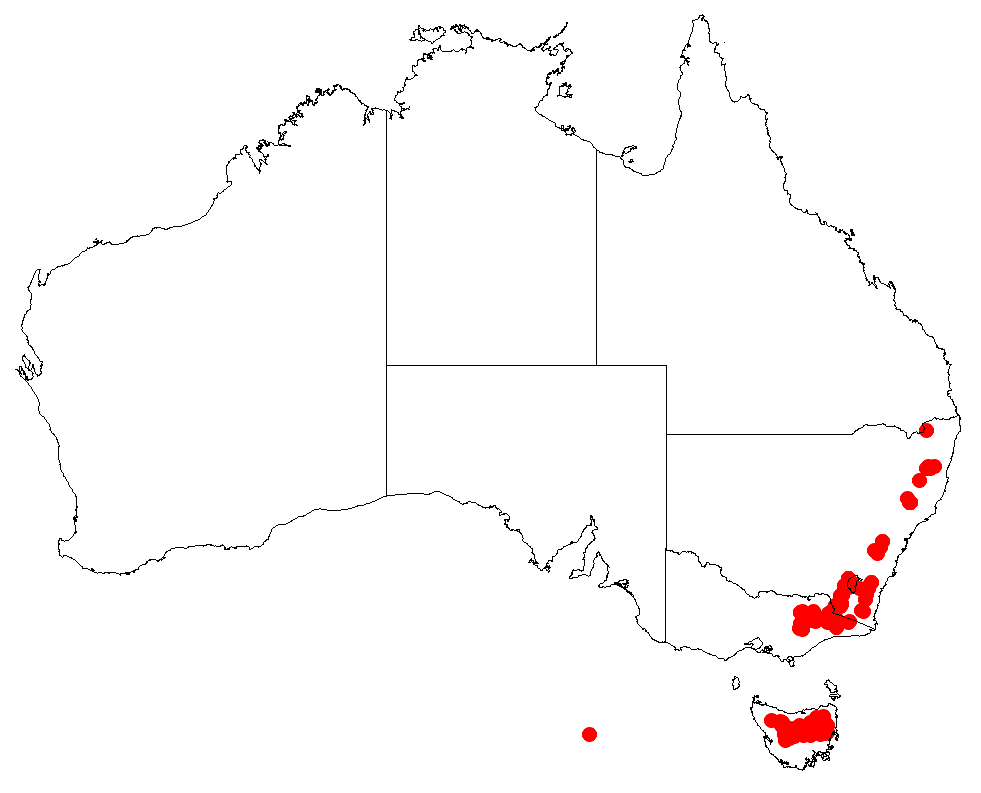
- Occurrence data from AVH

Synonyms
- Velleia montana Hook.f.

= Goodenia montana =

Mountain velleia

Species of flowering plant

Goodenia montana, commonly known as mountain velleia, is a flowering plant in the family Goodeniaceae. It is a small, perennial herb with lance-shaped to egg-shaped leaves with the narrower end towards the base, and yellow flowers. It mainly grows in woodland and sub-alpine grasslands in New South Wales, Victoria and Tasmania.

== Description ==
Goodenia montana is a small perennial herb that typically grows to 15 cm (5.9 in) high and forms a rosette. The leaves are lance-shaped to egg-shaped leaves with the narrower end towards the base, 15–80 mm (0.59–3.15 in) long, 6–30 mm (0.24–1.18 in) wide with toothed or smooth margins. The flowers are borne on a low-lying or ascending flowering stem up to 100 mm (3.9 in) long with bracteoles up to 5 mm (0.20 in) long. The lower sepal is egg-shaped to oblong, 5–6 mm (0.20–0.24 in) long. The yellow corolla is 7–10 mm (0.28–0.39 in) long, inner and outer surface covered with short, soft hairs. Flowering occurs from November to February and the fruit is a more or less spherical capsule about 2 mm (0.079 in) in diameter containing a seed about 1.5 mm (0.059 in) in diameter.

== Taxonomy and naming ==
This species was first formally described in 1847 by Joseph Dalton Hooker who gave it the name Velleia montana in the London Journal of Botany. In 2020, Kelly Anne Shepherd transferred the species to Goodenia as G. montana in the journal PhytoKeys. The specific epithet montana refers to mountains or coming from mountains.

== Distribution and habitat ==
Mountain velleia grows at higher altitudes in woodland, subalpine swamps and grassland south of Boonoo Boonoo National Park in New South Wales, and is common in Tasmania and eastern Victoria.
