= Goodenia salmoniana =

Conservation status
- Priority One — Poorly Known Taxa (DEC)

Scientific classification
- Kingdom: Plantae
- Clade: Tracheophytes
- Clade: Angiosperms
- Clade: Eudicots
- Clade: Asterids
- Order: Asterales
- Family: Goodeniaceae
- Genus: Goodenia
- Species: G. salmoniana

Binomial name
- Goodenia salmoniana (F.Muell.) Carolin

Synonyms
- Velleya salmoniana F.Muell. orth. var.; Velleia salmoniana F.Muell.

Species of plant

Goodenia salmoniana is a species of flowering plant in the family Goodeniaceae and only known from the type specimen collected in Western Australia in 1889. It an erect to ascending herb, with linear leaves and racemes of dark yellow flowers.

== Description ==
Goodenia salmoniana is an erect to ascending herb up to 30 cm (12 in) high, its foliage with a few soft hairs when young. The leaves on the stems are linear, more or less cylindrical, 10–35 mm (0.39–1.38 in) long and 0.5–1 mm (0.020–0.039 in) wide. The flowers are arranged in racemes up to 100 mm (3.9 in) long with leaf-like bracts, each flower on a pedicel 1–3 mm (0.039–0.118 in) long. The sepals are lance-shaped, about 2 mm (0.079 in) long, the corolla dark yellow, 6–7 mm (0.24–0.28 in) long. The lower lobes of the corolla are about 3 mm (0.12 in) long with wings about 0.5 mm (0.020 in) wide.

== Taxonomy and naming ==
This species was first formally described in 1892 by Ferdinand von Mueller who gave it the name Velleia salmoniana in The Victorian Naturalist from material collected near the Gascoyne River by Lady Margaret Forrest. In 1990 Roger Charles Carolin changed the name to Goodenia salmoniana in the journal Telopea. The specific epithet honours George Salmon.

== Distribution ==
This goodenia is only known from the type specimen, collected at an unknown location near the Gascoyne River in Western Australia.

== Conservation status ==
Goodenia salmoniana is classified as "Priority One" by the Government of Western Australia Department of Parks and Wildlife, meaning that it is known from only one or a few locations which are potentially at risk.
