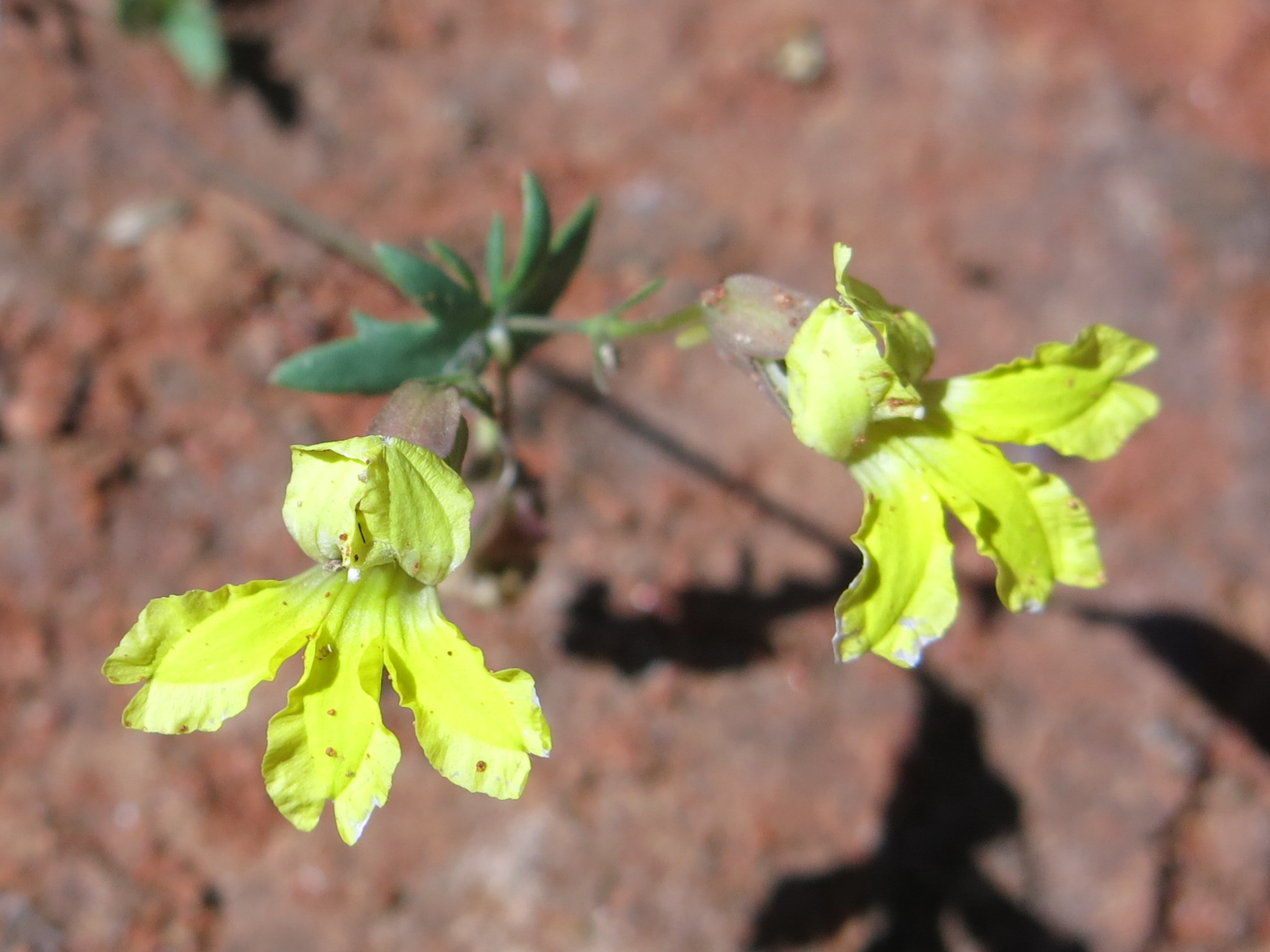
- Near Bourke

Scientific classification
- Kingdom: Plantae
- Clade: Tracheophytes
- Clade: Angiosperms
- Clade: Eudicots
- Clade: Asterids
- Order: Asterales
- Family: Goodeniaceae
- Genus: Goodenia
- Species: G. glabrata

Binomial name
- Goodenia glabrata (Carolin) K.A.Sheph.
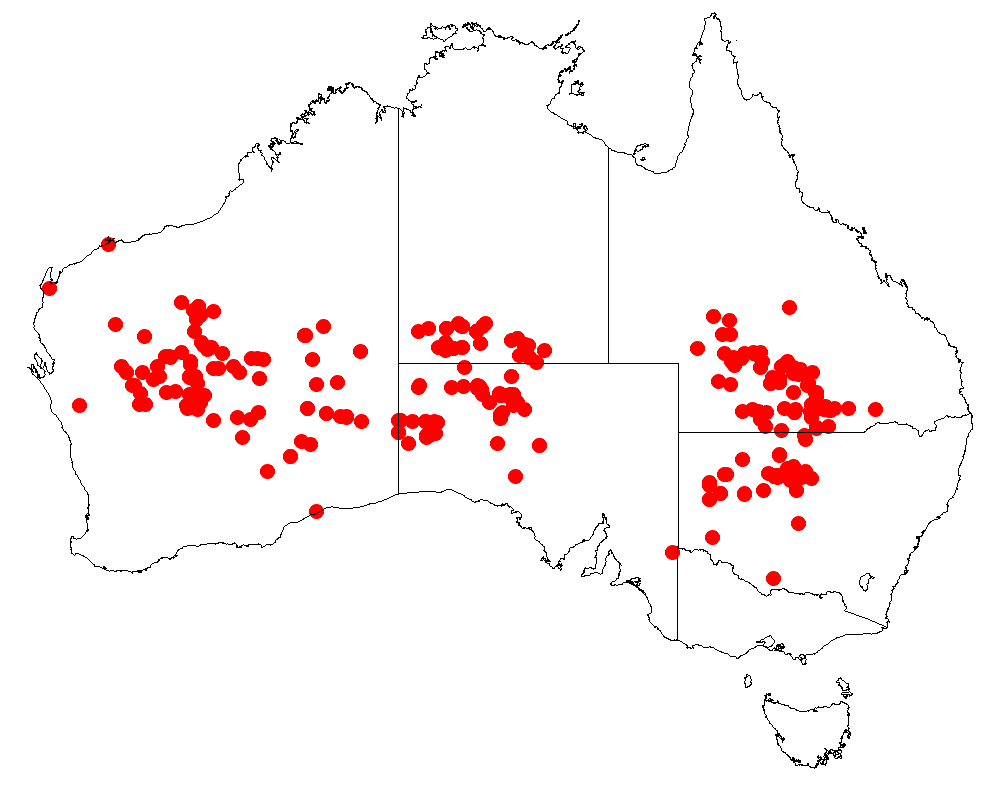
- Occurrence data for Goodenia glabrata from AVH

Synonyms
- Velleia glabrata Carolin

= Goodenia glabrata =

Species of plant

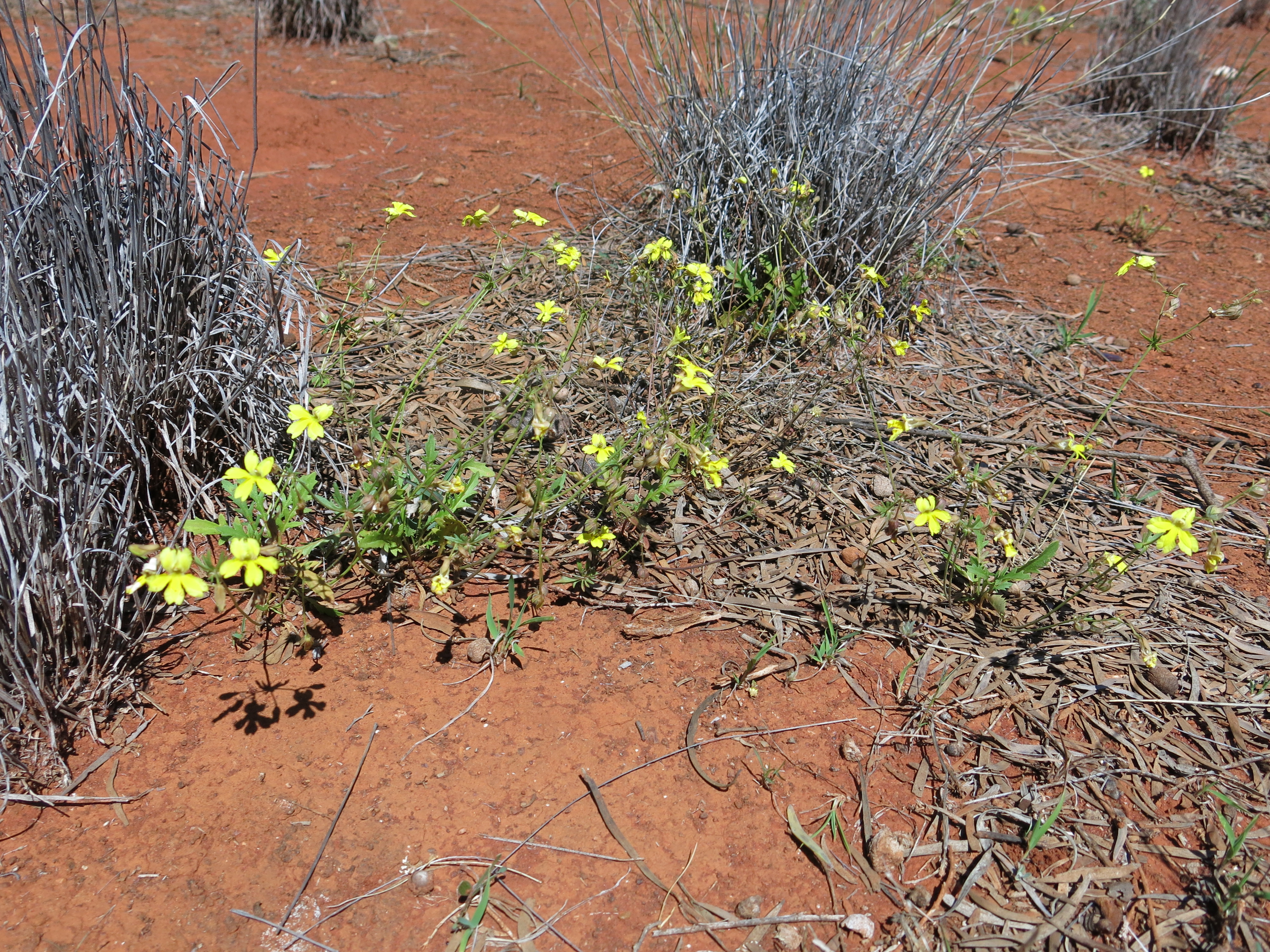
Habit

Goodenia glabrata, commonly known as pee the bed, is a species of flowering plant in the family Goodeniaceae and is native to mainland Australia. It is a mostly glabrous annual herb with ascending flowering stems, oblong to lance-shaped leaves with toothed edges, and yellow flowers.

== Description ==
Goodenia glabrata is a mostly glabrous annual herb with erect stems up to 30 cm (12 in) long. Its leaves are oblong to lance-shaped with the narrower end towards the base, 40–80 mm (1.6–3.1 in) long and up to 20 mm (0.79 in) wide with toothed to lyre-shaped edges. The flowers are borne on an ascending flowering stem up to 380 mm (15 in) long with bracteoles up to 2 mm (0.079 in) long and joined at the base. The lower sepal is 5–6 mm (0.20–0.24 in) long, and the petals are yellow, 12–14 mm (0.47–0.55 in) long and hairy, with wings about 2 mm (0.079 in) wide almost to the base of the lower sepal. Flowering mainly occurs from July to February and the fruit is a more or less spherical capsule containing seeds 4–5 mm (0.16–0.20 in) in diameter with wings about 1 mm (0.039 in) wide.

== Taxonomy ==
This species was first formally described in 1967 by Roger Charles Carolin who gave it the name Velleia glabrata in the Proceedings of the Linnean Society of New South Wales. In 2020, Kelly Anne Shepherd and others transferred it to the genus Goodenia as G. glabrata in Australian Systematic Botany.

== Distribution and habitat ==
Goodenia glabrata grows in drier communities and occurs in all mainland states of Australia except Victoria. It is widespread in mainly inland areas of Western Australia, in the south of the Northern Territory, in the north-west of South Australia in Queensland, and in western New South Wales between Bourke and Brewarrina.
