= Goodenia cusackiana =

Scientific classification
- Kingdom: Plantae
- Clade: Tracheophytes
- Clade: Angiosperms
- Clade: Eudicots
- Clade: Asterids
- Order: Asterales
- Family: Goodeniaceae
- Genus: Goodenia
- Species: G. cusackiana

Binomial name
- Goodenia cusackiana (F.Muell.) Carolin

Synonyms
- Velleia cusackiana F.Muell.; Velleya cusackiana F.Muell. orth. var.

Species of plant

Goodenia cusackiana is a species of flowering plant in the family Goodeniaceae and is endemic to the north-west of Western Australia. It an erect herb, densely covered with silvery hairs and has a woody stem, narrow elliptic to lance-shaped leaves, and racemes of yellow flowers.

== Description ==
Goodenia cusackiana is an erect herb up to 40 cm (16 in) high, but with a woody stem at the base, and densely covered with silvery hairs. The leaves are narrow elliptic to lance-shaped, 30–50 mm (1.2–2.0 in) long and 3–5 mm (0.12–0.20 in) wide. The flowers are arranged in racemes up to 300 mm (12 in) long with linear to triangular bracts at the base, each flower on a pedicel 1–4 mm (0.039–0.157 in) long. The sepals are lance-shaped, 2–3 mm (0.079–0.118 in) long, the corolla yellow, 8–10 mm (0.31–0.39 in) long. The lower lobes of the corolla are 3–4 mm (0.12–0.16 in) long with wings about 1 mm (0.039 in) wide. Flowering occurs from July to September.

== Taxonomy and naming ==
This species was first formally described in 1896 by Ferdinand von Mueller who gave it the name Velleia cusackiana in The Victorian Naturalist from material collected near the "Fortesque-River" by William Henry Cusack. In 1990 Roger Charles Carolin changed the name to Goodenia cusackiana in the journal Telopea.

== Distribution and habitat ==
This goodenia grows in rocky soil in the Pilbara and Carnarvon bioregions of Western Australia.

== Conservation status ==
Goodenia cusackiana is classified as "not threatened" by the Government of Western Australia Department of Parks and Wildlife.
