= Goodenia parvisepta =

Scientific classification
- Kingdom: Plantae
- Clade: Tracheophytes
- Clade: Angiosperms
- Clade: Eudicots
- Clade: Asterids
- Order: Asterales
- Family: Goodeniaceae
- Genus: Goodenia
- Species: G. parvisepta

Binomial name
- Goodenia parvisepta (Carolin) K.A.Sheph.
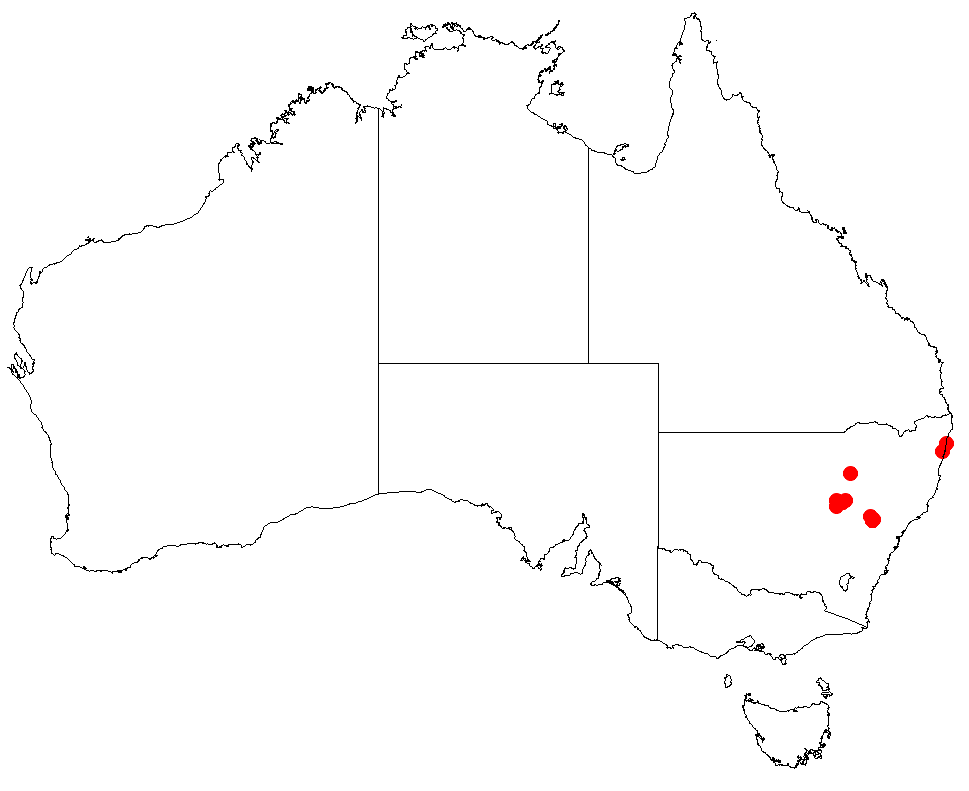
- Occurrence data for Goodenia parvisepta from AVH

Synonyms
- Velleia parvisepta Carolin

Species of plant

Goodenia parvisepta is a species of flowering plant in the family Goodeniaceae and is endemic to a small area of New South Wales. It is a glabrous perennial herb with erect flowering stems, lance-shaped leaves with toothed or lobed edges, and yellow flowers.

== Description ==
Goodenia parvisepta is a glabrous, perennial herb with erect or ascending flowering stems up to 40 cm (16 in) long. Its leaves are lance-shaped with the narrower end towards the base, 80–150 mm (3.1–5.9 in) long and 8–20 mm (0.31–0.79 in) wide with toothed or lobed edges. The flowers are borne on the flowering stem with bracteoles up to 10 mm (0.39 in) long and free from each other. The lower sepal is elliptic, 7–8 mm (0.28–0.31 in) long, and the petals are yellow, 8–12 mm (0.31–0.47 in) long and hairy only on the outside, with wings about 1 mm (0.039 in) wide, almost to the base of the lower sepal. Flowering mainly occurs from September to January and the fruit is a more or less spherical capsule containing seeds about 2 mm (0.079 in) in diameter.

== Taxonomy ==
This species was first formally described in 1967 by Roger Charles Carolin who gave it the name Velleia parvisepta in the Proceedings of the Linnean Society of New South Wales. In 2020, Kelly Anne Shepherd and others transferred it to the genus Goodenia as G. parvisepta in Australian Systematic Botany.

== Distribution and habitat ==
Goodenia parvisepta grows in damp situations in the Goonoo State Forest in New South Wales.
