= Goodenia daviesii =

Scientific classification
- Kingdom: Plantae
- Clade: Tracheophytes
- Clade: Angiosperms
- Clade: Eudicots
- Clade: Asterids
- Order: Asterales
- Family: Goodeniaceae
- Genus: Goodenia
- Species: G. daviesii

Binomial name
- Goodenia daviesii (F.Muell.)K.A.Sheph.
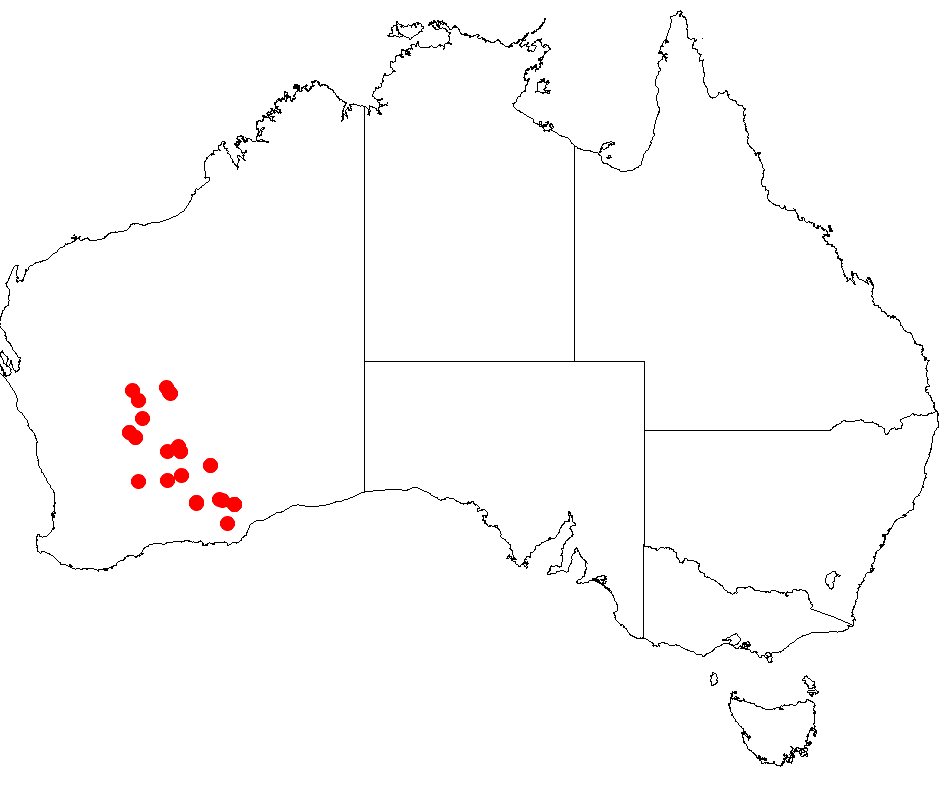
- Occurrence data from AVH

Synonyms
- Velleia daviesii F.Muell.

Genus of plants in the family Brassicaceae

Goodenia daviesii, commonly known as hairy velleia, is a species of flowering plant in the Goodeniaceae family and is endemic to inland areas of Western Australia. It is an annual herb with lyre-shaped, pinnatifid leaves and lilac to white flowers.

== Description ==
Goodenia daviesii is a softly-hairy, yellowish annual herb. The leaves are lance-shaped with the narrower end towards the base, lyre-shaped pinnatifid, and up to 20–70 mm (0.79–2.76 in) long and 10–30 mm (0.39–1.18 in) wide. The flowers are borne on an erect flowering stem 200–400 mm (7.9–15.7 in) high with leaf-like bracteoles, the lower ones up to 40 mm (1.6 in) long. The sepals are joined at the base to form a short tube, the lower lobes up to 10 mm (0.39 in) long. The petals are lilac to white, up to 20 mm (0.79 in) long. Flowering mainly occurs from August to December and the capsule is oval and contains more or less speherical seeds about 4 mm (0.16 in) in diameter.

== Taxonomy ==
This species was first formally described in 1876 by Ferdinand von Mueller who gave it the name Velleia daviesii in his Fragmenta phytographiae Australiae, from a specimen collected by Jess Young "near Ularing". In 2020, Kelly Anne Shepherd and others transferred it to the genus Goodenia, based on nuclear, chloroplast and mitochondrial data. The specific epithet (daviesii) honours Charles Davies.

== Distribution ==
Goodenia daviesii grows in scrub and steppe grassland in the Coolgardie, Great Sandy Desert and Murchison bioregions of inland Western Australia.

== Conservation status ==
Hairy velleia is listed as "not threatened" by the Western Australian Government Department of Biodiversity, Conservation and Attractions.
