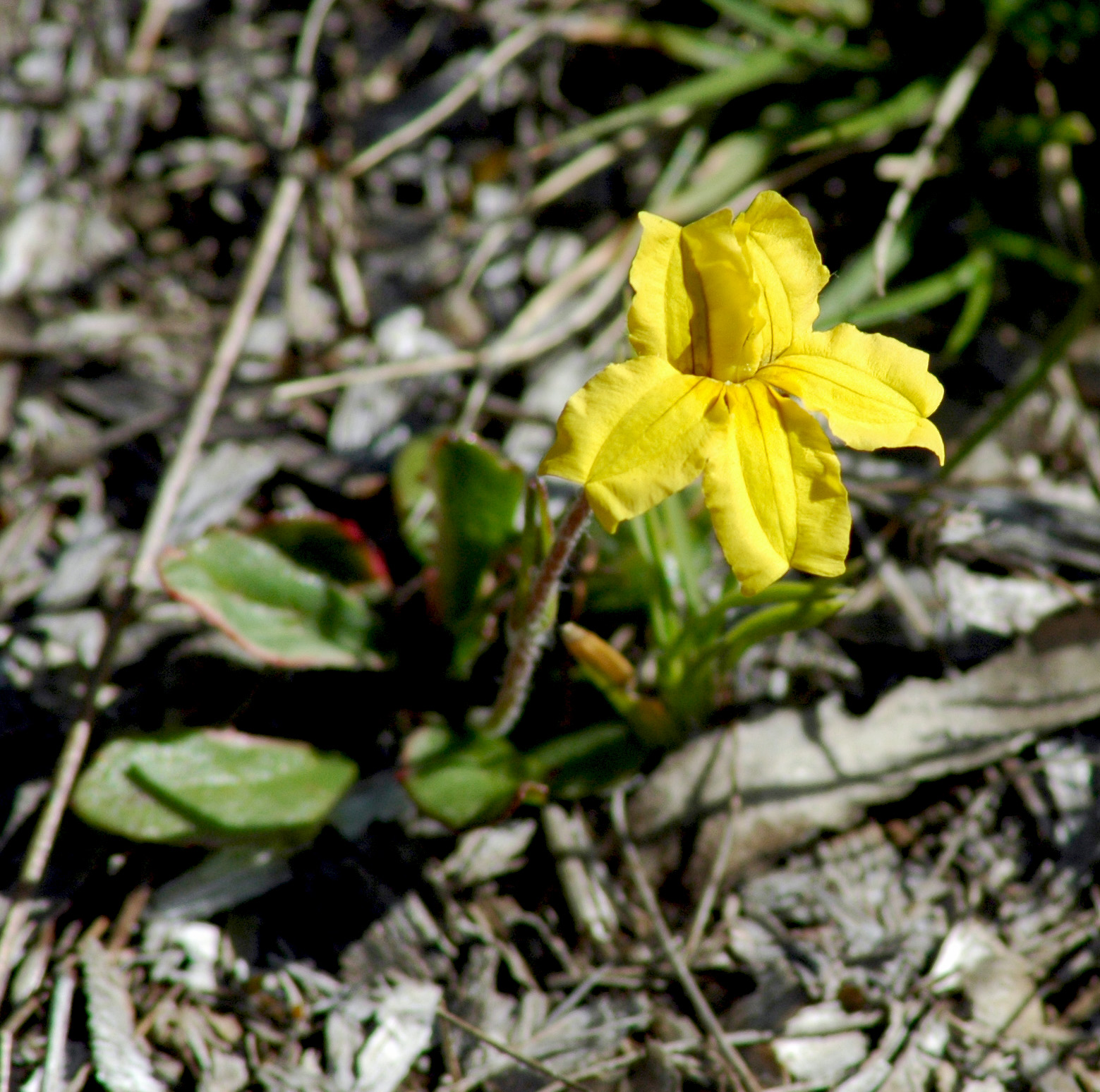

Scientific classification
- Kingdom: Plantae
- Clade: Tracheophytes
- Clade: Angiosperms
- Clade: Eudicots
- Clade: Asterids
- Order: Asterales
- Family: Goodeniaceae
- Genus: Goodenia
- Species: G. paradoxa

Binomial name
- Goodenia paradoxa (R.Br.) K.A.Sheph.
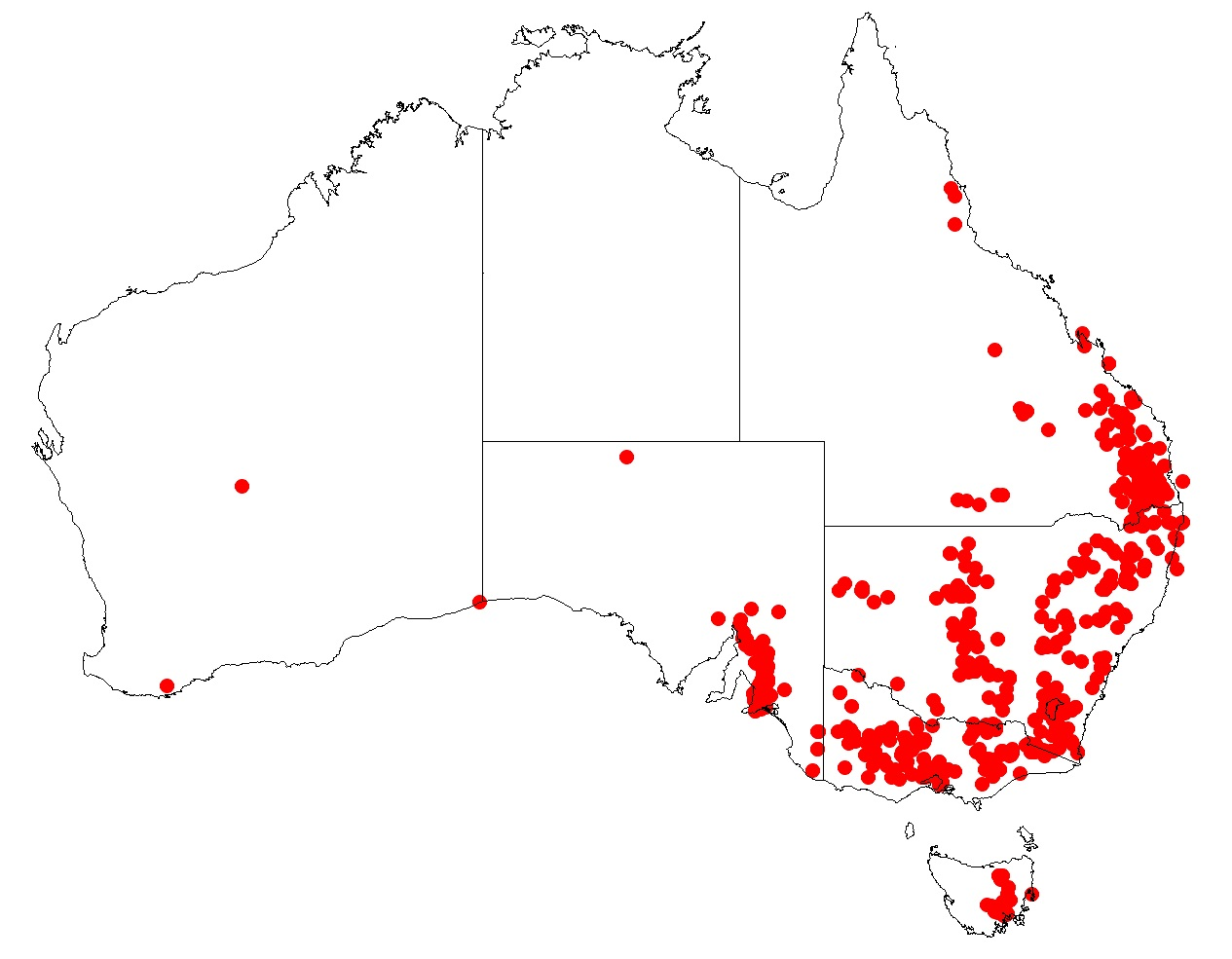
- Collections data for V. paradoxa from the Australasian Virtual Herbarium

Synonyms
- Velleia paradoxa R.Br.; Velleia paradoxa var. humilis DC.; Velleia paradoxa var. stenoptera Benth.

= Goodenia paradoxa =

Species of plant

Goodenia paradoxa, commonly known as spur velleia or spur goodenia, is a species of flowering plant in the family Goodeniaceae, and is endemic to Australia. It is a perennial herb covered with soft hairs, and has egg-shaped to elliptic leaves with toothed edges and yellow flowers on an ascending flowering stem.

== Description ==
Goodenia paradoxa is a perennial herb covered with soft hairs, and has ascending to prostrate flowering stems up to 60 cm (24 in) long. The leaves are egg-shaped with the narrower end towards the base, or elliptic, 70–250 mm (2.8–9.8 in) long, 15–35 mm (0.59–1.38 in) wide with toothed edges and forming a rosette at the base of the plant. There are oblong to egg-shaped bracteoles up to 40 mm (1.6 in) long at the base of the flowers, and the sepals oblong to egg-shaped, 4–9 mm (0.16–0.35 in) long. The petals are yellow, 10–20 mm (0.39–0.79 in) long with wings up to 3 mm (0.12 in) long to the base of the lower sepal. Flowering mostly occurs between August and February and the fruit is a compressed oval capsule 7–9 mm (0.28–0.35 in) long containing smooth round seeds 3–5 mm (0.12–0.20 in) in diameter.

== Taxonomy ==
The species was first formally described in 1810 by Robert Brown who gave it the name Velleia paradoxa in his Prodromus Florae Novae Hollandiae et Insulae Van Diemen. In 2020, Kelly Anne Shepherd and others transferred it to the genus Goodenia as G. paradoxa, based on nuclear, chloroplast and mitochondrial data.

== Distribution and habitat ==
Goodenia paradoxa is widespread in Victoria, New South Wales and in the south-east of South Australia and southern Queensland. It grows in sclerophyll forest and grassland. There are also records from a few places in Tasmania, including Hobart, Launceston, the Northern Midlands Southern Midlands and the Derwent Valley, but the species is listed as "vulnerable" under the Tasmanian Government Threatened Species Protection Act 1995.
