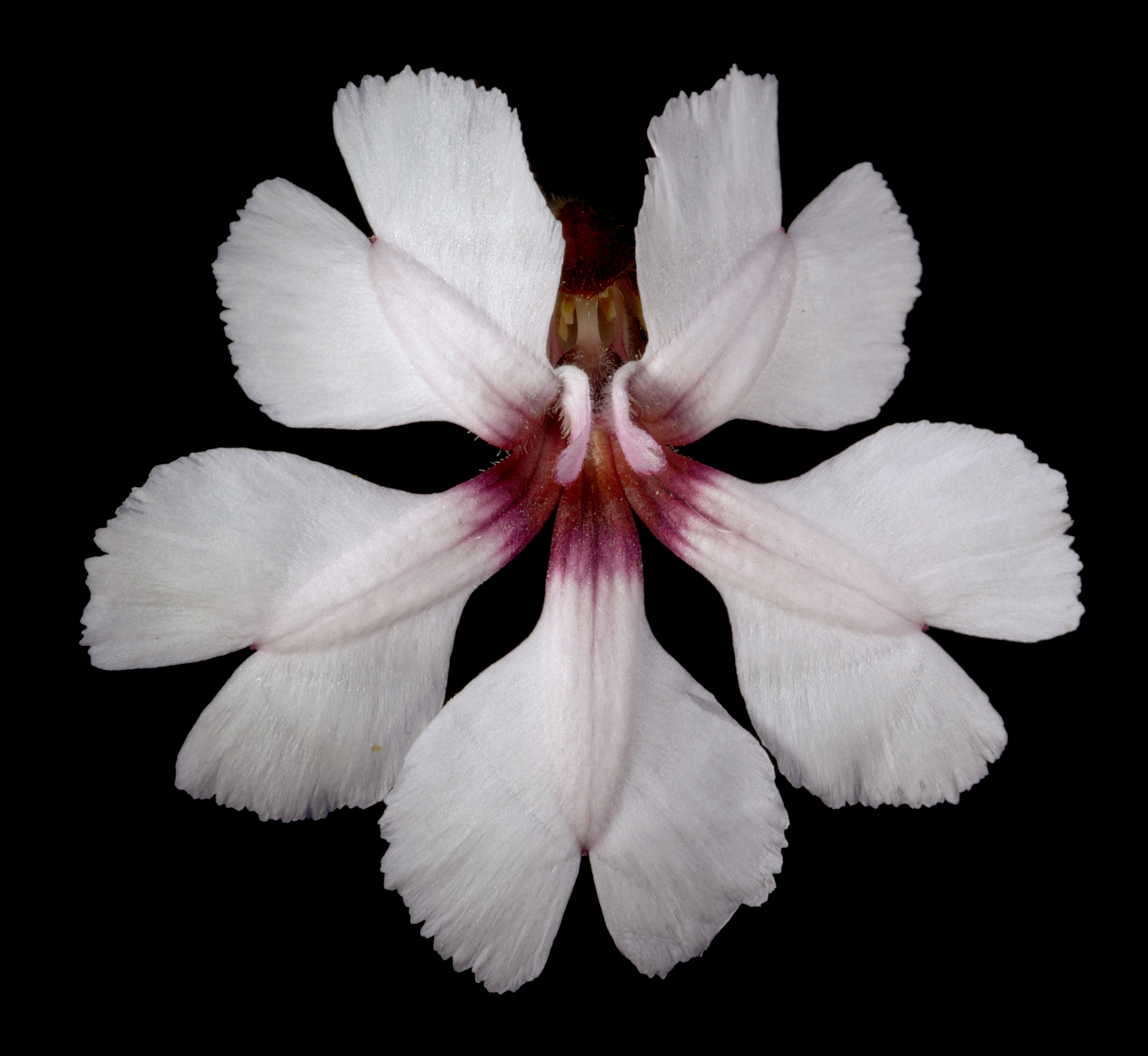
- Goodenia rosea

Scientific classification
- Kingdom: Plantae
- Clade: Tracheophytes
- Clade: Angiosperms
- Clade: Eudicots
- Clade: Asterids
- Order: Asterales
- Family: Goodeniaceae
- Genus: Goodenia
- Species: G. rosea

Binomial name
- Goodenia rosea S.Moore
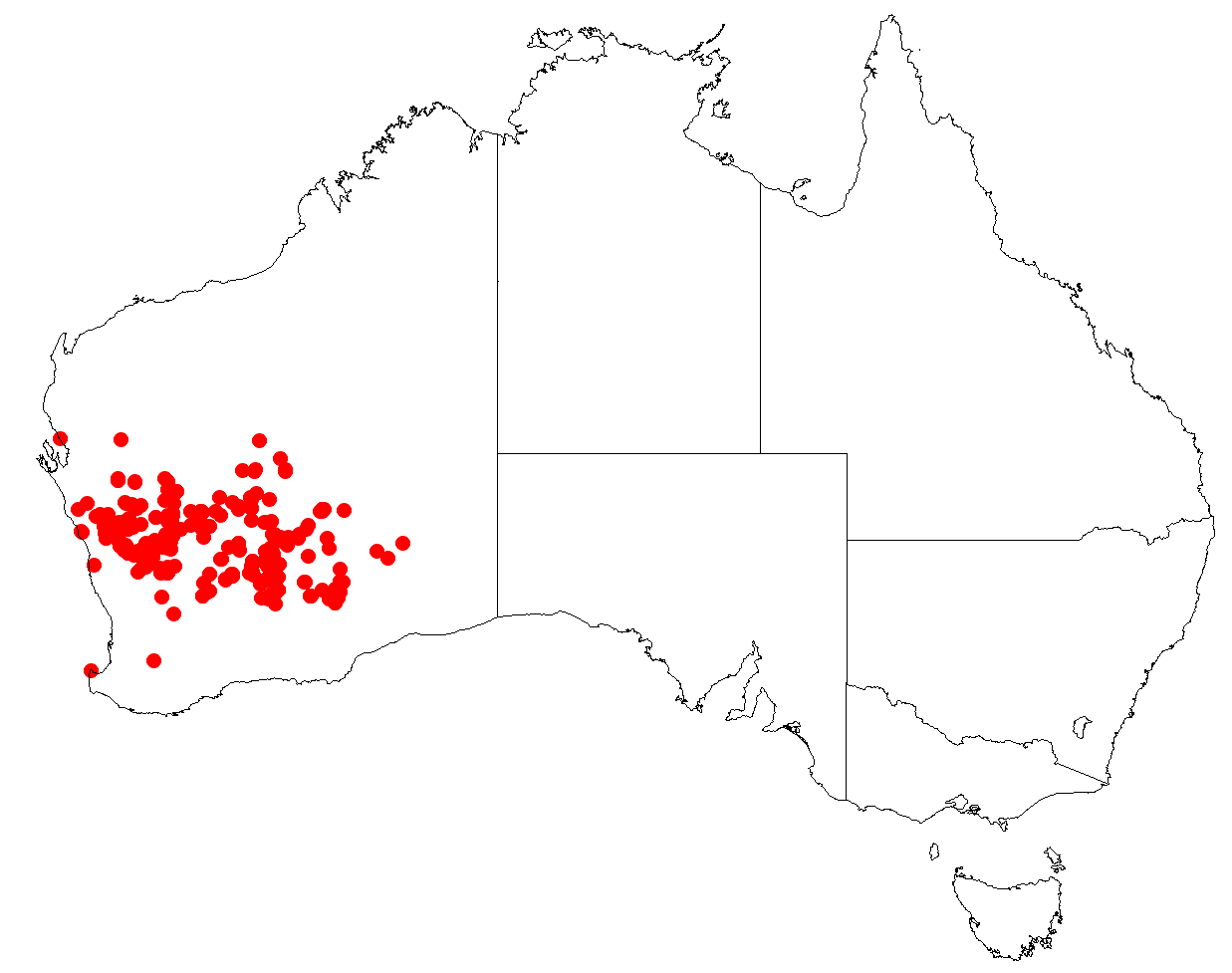
- Occurrence data from AVH

Synonyms
- Velleia rosea S.Moore; Velleia rosea var. erecta K.Krause

= Goodenia rosea =

Species of flowering plant

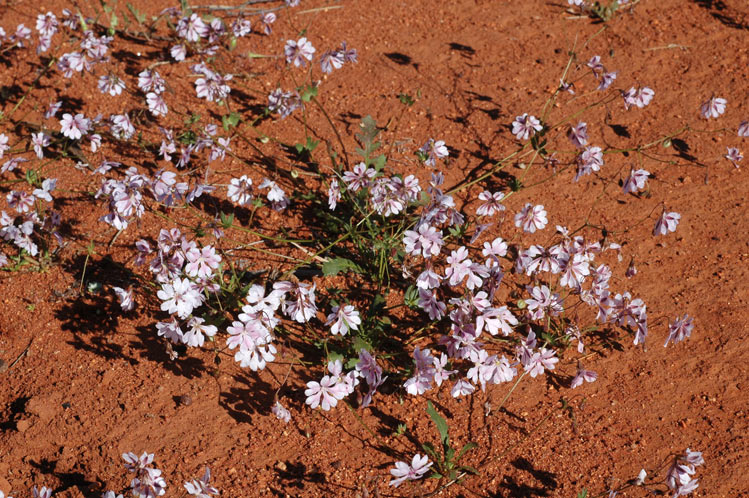
Habit near Paynes Find

Goodenia rosea, commonly known as pink velleia, is a species in the family Goodeniaceae and is endemic to inland areas of Western Australia. It is a perennial herb with lance-shaped to toothed or pinnatisect leaves, pink, lilac or white flowers on an ascending flower stem, and compressed fruit.

== Description ==
Goodenia rosea is an annual herb, with prostrate to ascending flowering stems, the leaves lance-shaped with the narrower end towards the base, to more or less toothed or pinnatisect. The leaves are 30–70 mm (1.2–2.8 in) long and 5–20 mm (0.20–0.79 in) wide. The bracteoles are leaf-like and usually free from each other, the lower ones up to 15 mm (0.59 in) long and toothed or incised. The flowers are borne on a prostrate to ascending flowering stem up to 150 mm (5.9 in) long, each flower on a glabrous pedicel 5–22 mm (0.20–0.87 in) long. The 5 sepals are hairy, 4.5–5.0 mm (0.18–0.20 in) long and the petals are pink, lilac or white, about 13 mm (0.51 in) long and hairy on the back and in the throat. Flowering mainly occurs from May to October, and the fruit is a compressed capsule containing a more or less round, wrinkled seed 4–5 mm (0.16–0.20 in) in diameter with a wing 1 mm (0.039 in) wide.

== Taxonomy ==
This species was first formally described in 1899 by Spencer Le Marchant Moore who gave it the name Velleia rosea in the Journal of the Linnean Society, Botany. In 2020, Kelly Anne Shepherd and others transferred it to the genus Goodenia as G. rosea in Australian Systematic Botany.

== Distribution and habitat ==
Goodenia rosea occurs in the area between Kalgoorlie, Cowcowing and near Geraldton in the Avon Wheatbelt, Carnarvon, Coolgardie, Gascoyne, Geraldton Sandplains, Great Victoria Desert, Murchison, Nullarbor and Yalgoo IBRA regions of inland Western Australia.
