= Goodenia perfoliata =

Conservation status
- Vulnerable (EPBC Act)

Scientific classification
- Kingdom: Plantae
- Clade: Tracheophytes
- Clade: Angiosperms
- Clade: Eudicots
- Clade: Asterids
- Order: Asterales
- Family: Goodeniaceae
- Genus: Goodenia
- Species: G. perfoliata

Binomial name
- Goodenia perfoliata (R.Br.) K.A.Sheph.
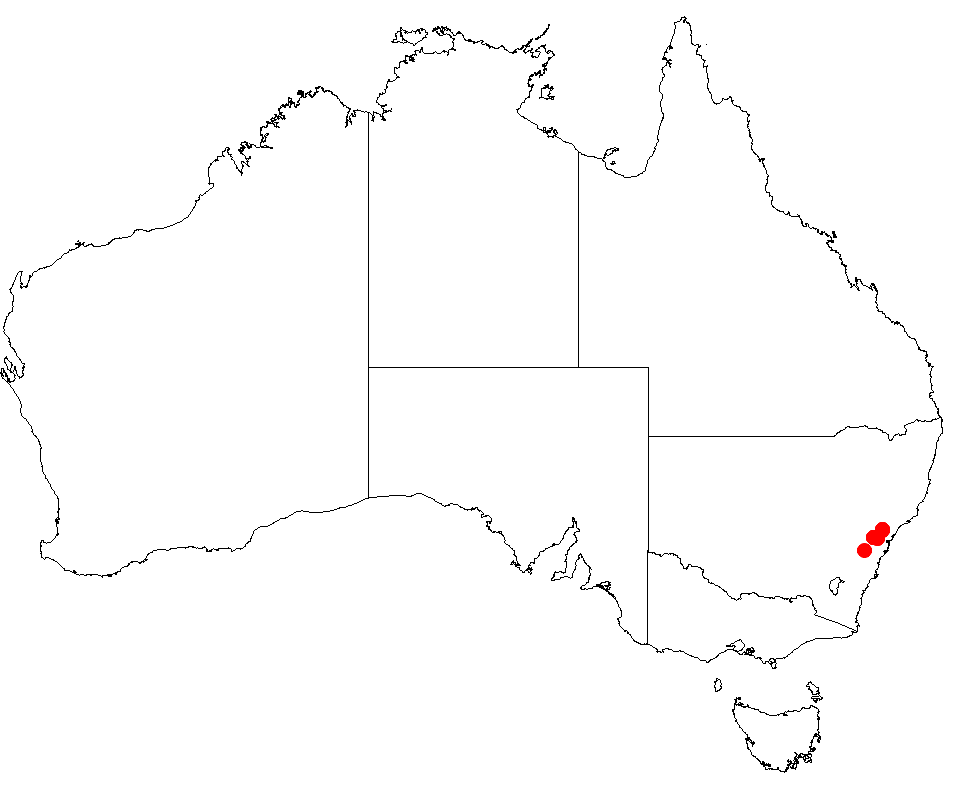
- Occurrence data for Goodenia perfoliata from AVH

Synonyms
- Velleia perfoliata Carolin

Species of plant

Goodenia perfoliata is a species of flowering plant in the family Goodeniaceae and is endemic to a small area of New South Wales. It is a mostly glabrous, perennial herb with erect flowering stems, lance-shaped leaves with sometimes deeply-toothed edges, and yellow flowers with bracteoles joined to form a disc-like funnel.

== Description ==
Goodenia perfoliata is a glabrous, perennial herb with erect or ascending flowering stems up to 50 cm (20 in) long. Its leaves are elliptic to lance-shaped with the narrower end towards the base, 100–250 mm (3.9–9.8 in) long and 25–60 mm (0.98–2.36 in) wide, sometimes with deeply-toothed edges. The flowers are borne on the flowering stem with bracteoles fused to each other, forming a disc-like funnel up to 80 mm (3.1 in) in diameter. The lower sepal is broadly elliptic, up to 8 mm (0.31 in) long, and the petals are yellow, 10–12 mm (0.39–0.47 in) long and hairy mostly only on the outside, with wings about 2 mm (0.079 in) wide, almost to the base of the lower sepal. Flowering mainly occurs in spring, and the fruit is a more or less spherical capsule about 4 mm (0.16 in) in diameter, containing a seed about 3 mm (0.12 in) in diameter with a narrow wing.

== Taxonomy ==
This species was first formally described in 1810 by Robert Brown who gave it the name Velleia perfoliata in his Prodromus Florae Novae Hollandiae et Insulae Van Diemen. In 2020, Kelly Anne Shepherd and others transferred it to the genus Goodenia as G. perfoliata in Australian Systematic Botany.

== Distribution and habitat ==
Goodenia perfoliata grows in open forest from near Wisemans Ferry and the Colo River to the upper Hunter Valley, in New South Wales.

== Conservation status ==
This species is listed as "vulnerable" under the Australian Government Environment Protection and Biodiversity Conservation Act 1999 and the New South Wales Government Biodiversity Conservation Act 2016.
