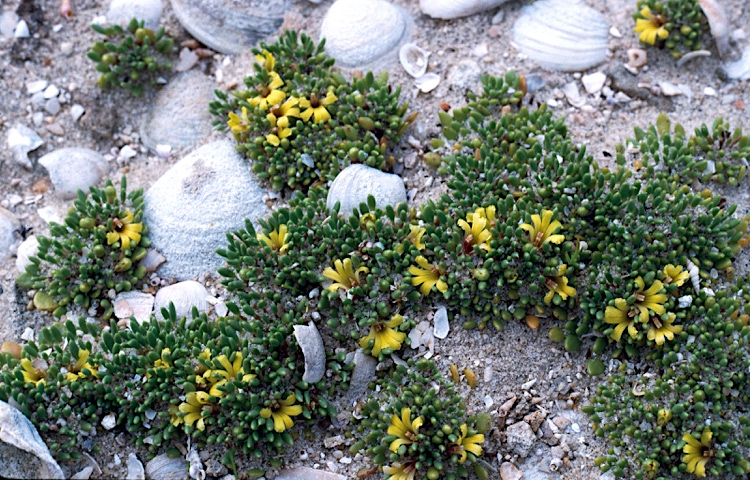
- In Stokes National Park

Conservation status
- Priority Two — Poorly Known Taxa (DEC)

Scientific classification
- Kingdom: Plantae
- Clade: Tracheophytes
- Clade: Angiosperms
- Clade: Eudicots
- Clade: Asterids
- Order: Asterales
- Family: Goodeniaceae
- Genus: Goodenia
- Species: G. exigua

Binomial name
- Goodenia exigua (F.Muell.)

Synonyms
- Selliera exigua (F.Muell.) Benth.; Velleia exigua (F.Muell.) Carolin

= Goodenia exigua =

Genus of plants in the family Brassicaceae

Goodenia exigua is a species of flowering plant in the Goodeniaceae family and is endemic to the south of Western Australia. It is a stoloniferous, perennial plant with whorls of spatula-shaped leaves and yellow flowers.

== Description ==
Goodenia exigua is a glabrous, stoloniferous perennial that typically grows to a height of 10 cm (3.9 in). The leaves are borne on the stems in irregular whorls of spatula-shaped leaves with a yellowish tip. The leaves are up to 10 mm (0.39 in) long and up to 3 mm (0.12 in) wide. The flowers are borne in cymes or are solitary, with linear bracteoles 1–2 mm (0.039–0.079 in) long at the base. The upper sepal is D-shaped, about 1 mm (0.039 in) long and the petals are about 2 mm (0.079 in) long, glabrous and yellow with short wings. The capsule is more or less round and contains wingless seeds about 1 mm (0.039 in) in diameter.

== Taxonomy ==
Goodenia exigua was first formally described in 1863 by Ferdinand von Mueller in his Fragmenta phytographiae Australiae, from a specimen collected by George Maxwell. The specific epithet (exigua) means "small" or "feeble", referring to the habit of the plant.

== Distribution ==
Goodenia exigua is found in the Avon Wheatbelt, Esperance Plains and Mallee bioregions of southern Western Australia.

== Conservation status ==
This species of goodenia is classified as "Priority Two" by the Government of Western Australia Department of Parks and Wildlife, meaning that it is rare or threatened.
