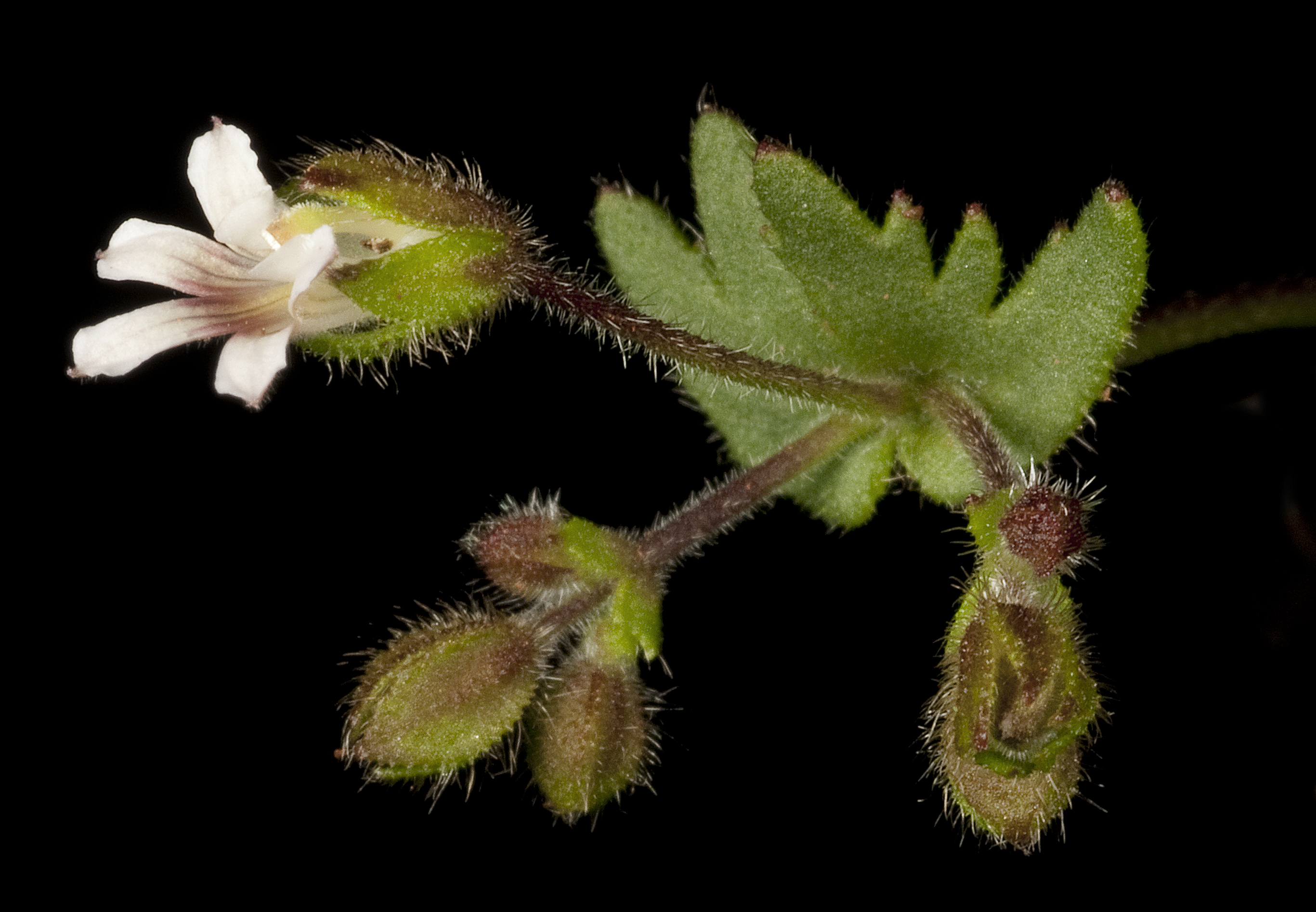

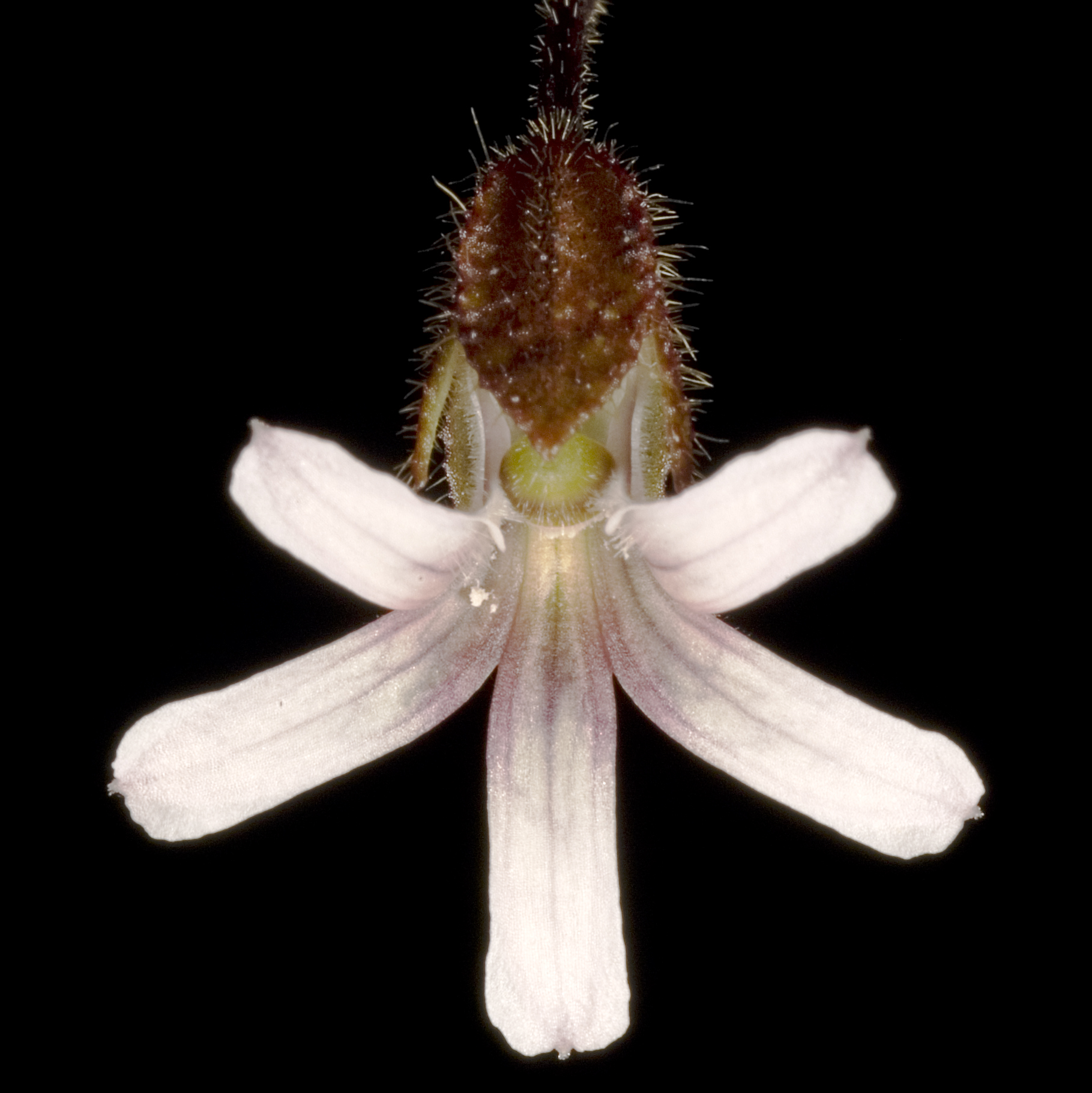

Scientific classification
- Kingdom: Plantae
- Clade: Tracheophytes
- Clade: Angiosperms
- Clade: Eudicots
- Clade: Asterids
- Order: Asterales
- Family: Goodeniaceae
- Genus: Goodenia
- Species: G. cycnopotamica

Binomial name
- Goodenia cycnopotamica (F.Muell.)K.A.Sheph.
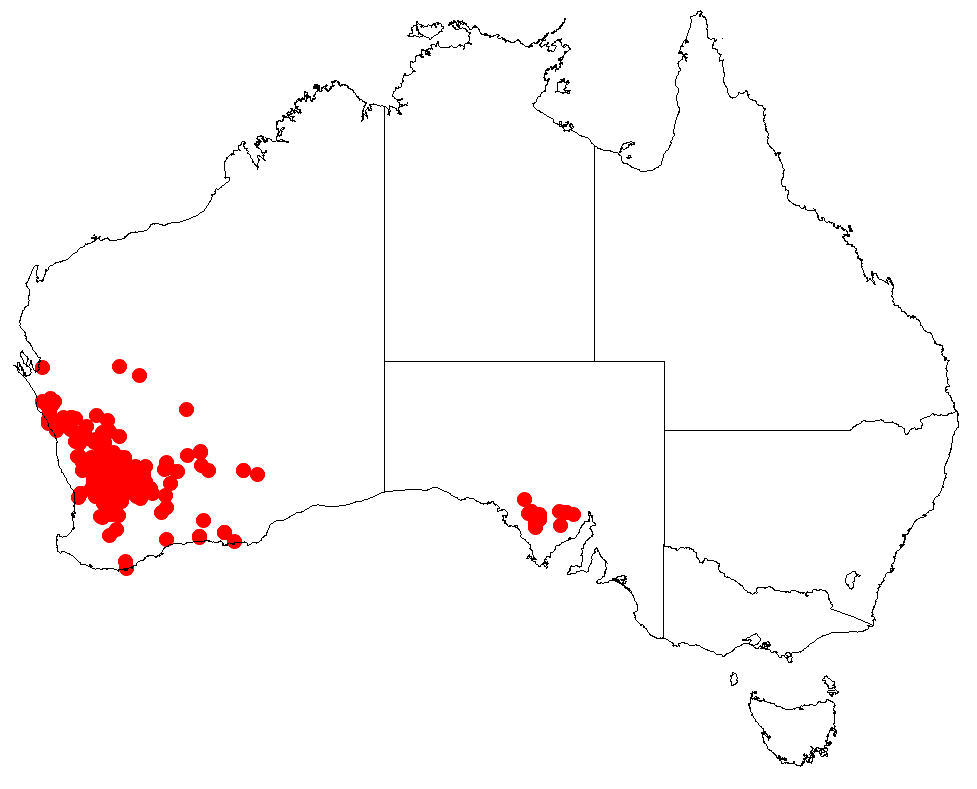
- Occurrence data from AVH

Synonyms
- Velleia cycnopotamica F.Muell.

= Goodenia cycnopotamica =

Genus of plants in the family Brassicaceae

Goodenia cycnopotamica is a species of flowering plant in the Goodeniaceae family and is endemic to Australia, found in both South Australia and Western Australia. It is an annual herb with oblong to lance-shaped leaves and pink or lilac to white flowers.

== Description ==
Goodenia cycnopotamica is an annual herb. The flower stalks are up to 25 cm long. Leaves oblong to oblanceolate, dentate to lyrate; lamina 2-6 cm long, 3-10 mm wide. The bracteoles are up to 15 mm long, and free. The sepals are free or nearly free, about 4 mm long, and are oblong to elliptic, and attached below the ovary. The pink, lilac to white corolla is 5 to 6 mm long, and hairy to almost smooth on the outside, while the inside is sometimes glabrous and sometimes not. There are no projections. The ovary has about four ovules. The capsule is globular. The seeds are wrinkled and 3 to 4 mm in diameter, with a comma-shaped body and broad wings. It flowers mainly from August to October.

== Taxonomy ==
This species was first formally described in 1867 by Ferdinand von Mueller who gave it the name Velleia cycnopotamica in his Fragmenta phytographiae Australiae, from a specimen collected by James Drummond on the banks of the Swan River. In 2020, Kelly Anne Shepherd and others transferred it to the genus Goodenia, based on nuclear, chloroplast and mitochondrial data.

== Distribution ==
Goodenia cycnopotamica is found in the Avon Wheatbelt, Carnarvon, Coolgardie, Esperance Plains, Geraldton Sandplains, Great Victoria Desert, Jarrah Forest, Mallee, Murchison and Yalgoo bioregions of Western Australia, and on the Eyre Peninsula of South Australia.
