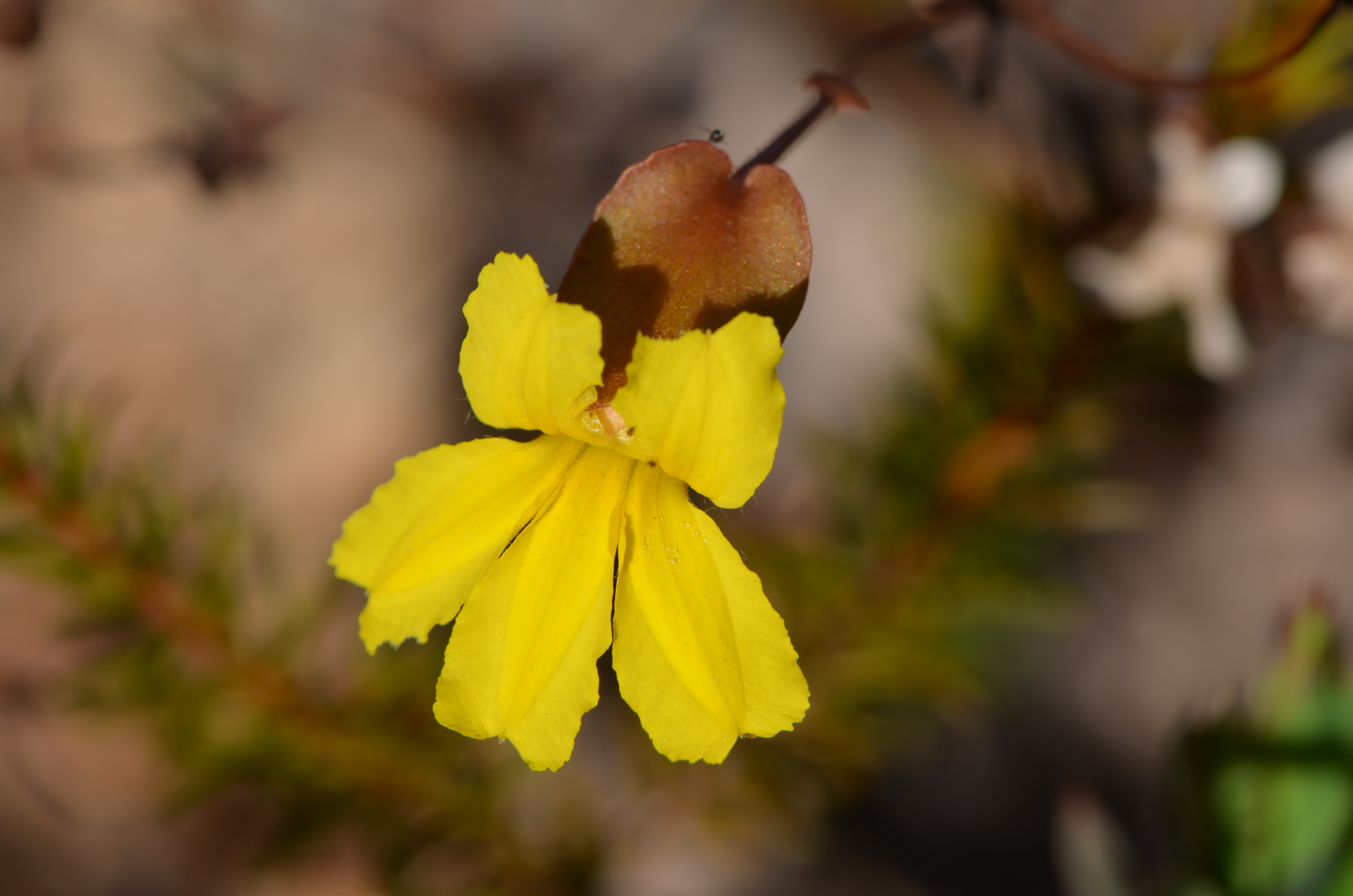

Scientific classification
- Kingdom: Plantae
- Clade: Tracheophytes
- Clade: Angiosperms
- Clade: Eudicots
- Clade: Asterids
- Order: Asterales
- Family: Goodeniaceae
- Genus: Goodenia
- Species: G. caroliniana

Binomial name
- Goodenia caroliniana K.A.Sheph.
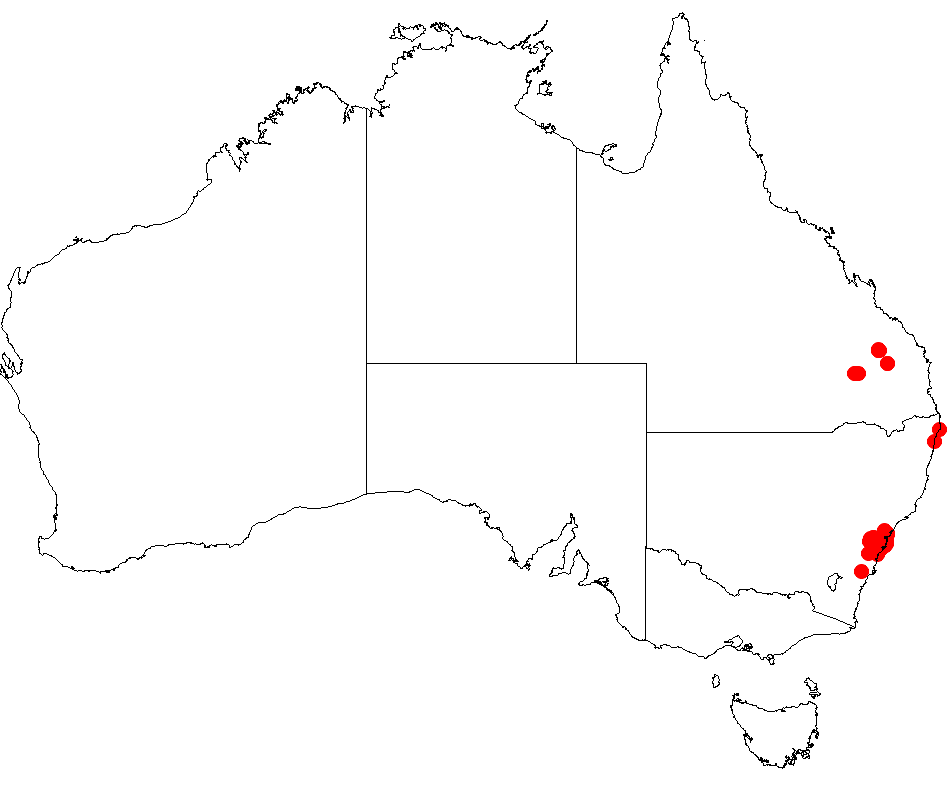
- Occurrence data from AVH

Synonyms
- Velleia lyrata R.Br.; Velleia dichotoma DC.

= Goodenia caroliniana =

Species of flowering plant

Goodenia caroliniana is a species of flowering plant in the family Goodeniaceae, and is endemic to eastern Australia. It is a perennial herb with egg-shaped to lance-shaped leaves with toothed edges and the narrower end toward the base, and erect flowering stems up to 50 cm (20 in) high and yellow flowers.

== Description ==
Goodenia caroliniana is a more or less glabrous perennial herb with egg-shaped to lance-shaped leaves with toothed edges and the narrower end toward the base, 30–180 mm (1.2–7.1 in) long and 10–40 mm (0.39–1.57 in) wide. The flowers are borne on an ascending to erect flowering stem up to 500 mm (20 in) long with bracteoles up to 15 mm (0.59 in) long at the base. The lower sepal is heart-shaped, and the petals are 10–15 mm (0.39–0.59 in) long and hairy, with wings 1–2 mm (0.039–0.079 in) wide almost to the base of the lower sepal. Flowering mainly occurs from August to April and the fruit is a more or less spherical capsule containing seeds 1.0–2.5 mm (0.039–0.098 in) wide.

== Taxonomy ==
This species was first described in 1810 by Robert Brown who gave it the name Velleia lyrata in his Prodromus Florae Novae Hollandiae et Insulae Van Diemen. In 2020, Kelly Anne Shepherd and others transferred it to the genus Goodenia but the name G. lyrata was unavailable as it was preoccupied by a species described by Roger Charles Carolin. Shepherd named the new species G. caroliniana in honour of Carolin.

== Distribution and habitat ==
Goodenia caroliniana grows in damp heath on sandy soil mainly near Sydney, but also in Queensland.
