= Goodenia macroplectra =

Scientific classification
- Kingdom: Plantae
- Clade: Tracheophytes
- Clade: Angiosperms
- Clade: Eudicots
- Clade: Asterids
- Order: Asterales
- Family: Goodeniaceae
- Genus: Goodenia
- Species: G. macroplectra

Binomial name
- Goodenia macroplectra (F.Muell.) Carolin

Synonyms
- Symphyobasis macroplectra (F.Muell.) K.Krause; Velleia macroplectra F.Muell.

Species of plant

Goodenia macroplectra is a species of flowering plant in the family Goodeniaceae and is endemic to inland Western Australia. It an erect herb with toothed, lance-shaped leaves at the base of the plant, and racemes of dark yellow flowers with a long spur.

== Description ==
Goodenia macroplectra is an erect herb with stems that typically grows to a height of up to 20 cm (7.9 in). The leaves at the base of the plant are lance-shaped with the narrower end towards the base, 30–60 mm (1.2–2.4 in) long and 4–10 mm (0.16–0.39 in) wide with toothed edges. The leaves on the stem are similar but smaller. The flowers are arranged in racemes up to 100 mm (3.9 in) long with leaf-like bracts, the individual flowers on pedicels up to 25 mm (0.98 in) long. The sepals are lance-shaped, about 4 mm (0.16 in) long, the corolla yellow with a long spur and 8–13 mm (0.31–0.51 in) long. The lower lobes of the corolla are 3–6 mm (0.12–0.24 in) long with wings about 0.5 mm (0.020 in) wide. Flowering mainly occurs from August to September and the fruit is a compressed spherical capsule 6–7 mm (0.24–0.28 in) long.

== Taxonomy and naming ==
This species was first formally described in 1882 by Ferdinand von Mueller who gave it the name Velleia macroplectra in Fragmenta Phytographiae Australiae. In 1990 Roger Charles Carolin changed the name to Goodenia macroplectra in the journal Telopea and selected the specimens collected by John Forrest near the Gascoyne River as the lectotype. The specific epithet (macroplectra) means "large spur".

== Distribution and habitat ==
This goodenia grows in inland areas of Western Australia between the Gascoyne River and Leonora.

== Conservation status ==
Goodenia macroplectra is classified as "not threatened" by the Western Australian Government Department of Parks and Wildlife.
