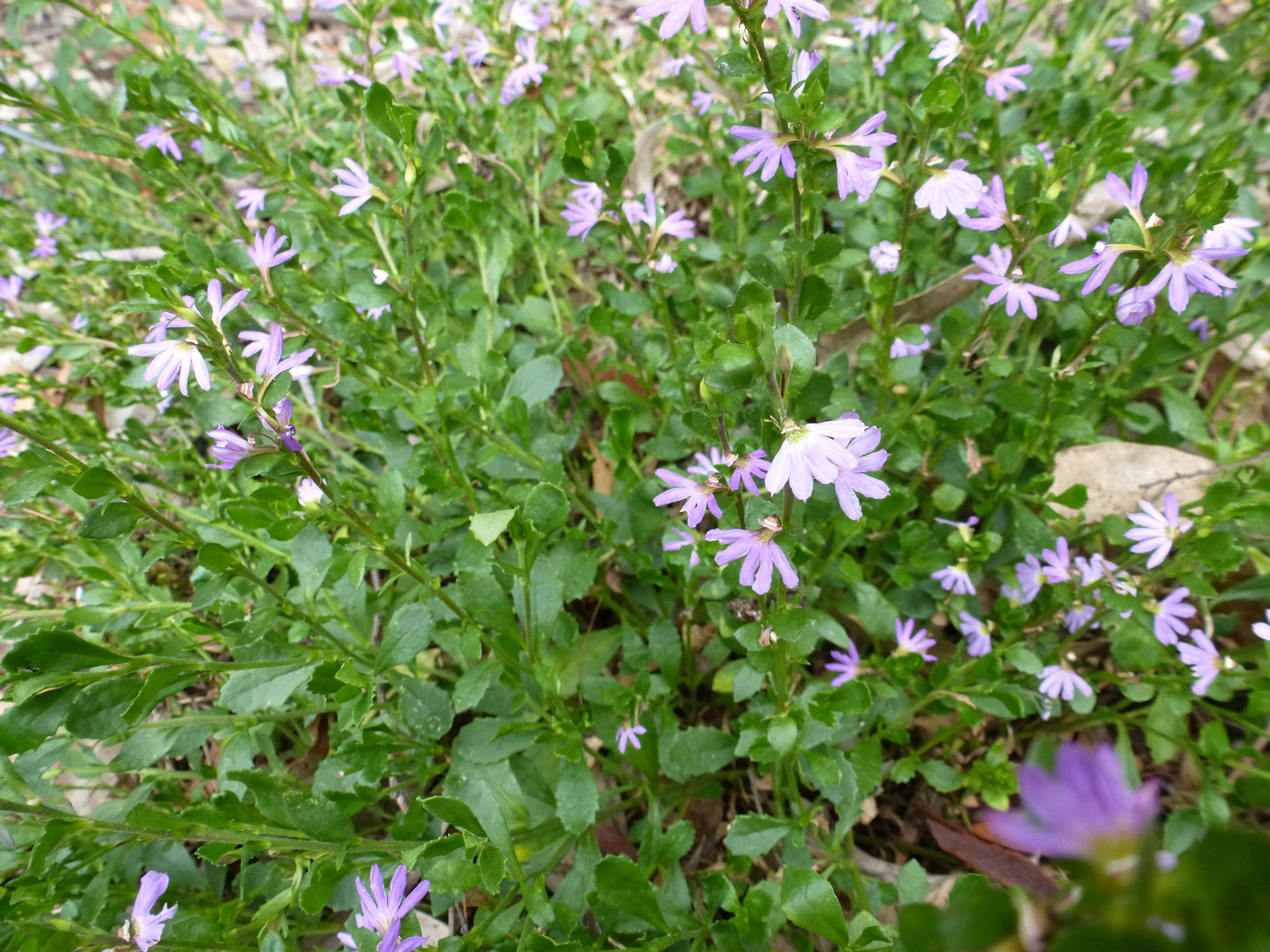
- In the ANBG

Scientific classification
- Kingdom: Plantae
- Clade: Tracheophytes
- Clade: Angiosperms
- Clade: Eudicots
- Clade: Asterids
- Order: Asterales
- Family: Goodeniaceae
- Genus: Scaevola
- Species: S. albida

Binomial name
- Scaevola albida (Sm.) Druce
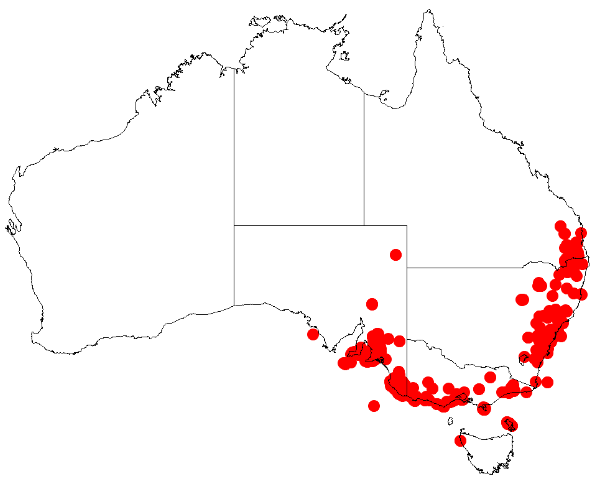
- Occurrence data from Australasian Virtual Herbarium

Synonyms
- List: Goodenia albida Sm.; Goodenia laevigata Curtis; Goodenia pubescens Sieber ex Spreng.; Lobelia microcarpa (Cav.) Kuntze nom. illeg.; Merkusia microcarpa (Cav.) de Vriese; Merkusia pallida (R.Br.) de Vriese; Scaevola albida (Sm.) Druce var. albida; Scaevola albida var. pallida (R.Br.) Carolin; Scaevola laevigata (Curtis) Pers.; Scaevola laevigata var. albida (Sm.) Pers.; Scaevola laevigata (Curtis) Pers. var. laevigata; Scaevola microcarpa Cav.; Scaevola microcarpa Cav. var. microcarpa; Scaevola microcarpa var. pallida (R.Br.) Benth.; Scaevola pallida R.Br.

= Scaevola albida =

White fan-flower

Species of plant

Scaevola albida, commonly known as pale fan-flower or small-fruit fan-flower, is a flowering plant in the family Goodeniaceae, and is endemic to eastern Australia. It is a prostrate to ascending perennial herb with egg-shaped to elliptic leaves, sometimes with toothed edges, pale blue or white fan-shaped flowers and elliptic fruit.

== Description ==
Scaevola albida is a prostrate to ascending perennial herb that typically grows up to 50 cm (20 in) high with stems sometimes covered with soft hairs. The leaves are elliptic to egg-shaped, wavy, bright green, semi-succulent and slightly hairy, 0.6–5 cm (0.24–1.97 in) long, 1–25 mm (0.039–0.984 in) wide, margins smooth or toothed, and sessile. The flowers are borne in upper leaf axils on stems up to 25 cm (9.8 in) long, with five white, pale blue or lilac petals, 5–10 mm (0.20–0.39 in) long with white, more or less flattened hairs on the outer surface. Flowering occurs mostly from October to January and the fruit is an urn-like shaped, usually one-seeded, papery fruit 2–4 mm (0.079–0.157 in) long.

== Taxonomy and naming ==
Thi species was first formally described in 1794 by James Edward Smith who gave it the name Goodenia albida in the Transactions of the Linnean Society of London, from specimens collected by John White in Port Jackson. In 1917, George Claridge Druce transferred the species to Scaevola as S. albida in The Botanical Exchange Club and Society of the British Isles. The specific epithet (albida) means "white".

== Distribution and habitat ==
Pale fan-flower grows near coastal scrubland, grassy headlands and ranges in New South Wales, Tasmania, South Australia, Victoria and Queensland.
