= Goodenia discophora =

Scientific classification
- Kingdom: Plantae
- Clade: Tracheophytes
- Clade: Angiosperms
- Clade: Eudicots
- Clade: Asterids
- Order: Asterales
- Family: Goodeniaceae
- Genus: Goodenia
- Species: G. discophora

Binomial name
- Goodenia discophora (F.Muell.)K.A.Sheph.
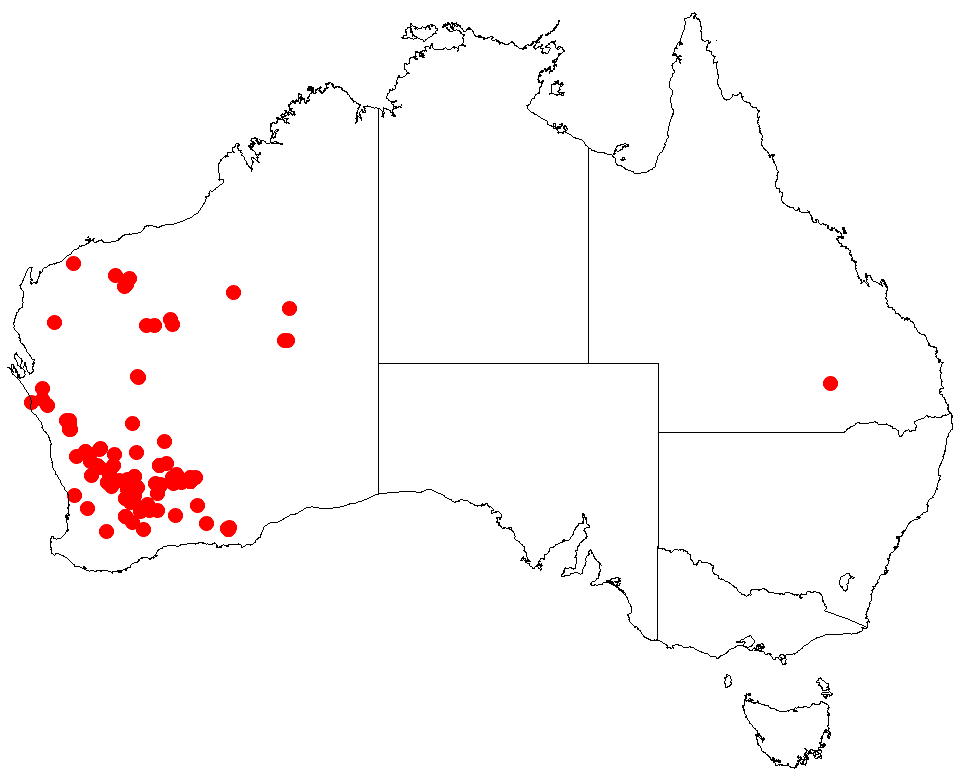
- Occurrence data from AVH

Synonyms
- Velleia discophora F.Muell.

Genus of plants in the family Brassicaceae

Goodenia discophora, commonly known as cabbage poison, is a species of flowering plant in the Goodeniaceae family and is endemic to the south-west of Western Australia. It is a herb with lyre-shaped, pinnatifid leaves and yellow flowers.

== Description ==
Goodenia discophora is a glabrous herb with lance-shaped leaves, the narrower end towards the base or lyre-shaped pinnatifid leaves up to 200 mm (7.9 in) long and up to 50 mm (2.0 in) wide. The flowers are borne on a more or less erect flowering stem up to 800 mm (31 in) long with bracteoles joined, forming a funnel up to 50 mm (2.0 in) wide. The sepals are joined at the base to form a short tube, the lower lobes up to 5–6 mm (0.20–0.24 in) long. The petals are yellow, 10–13 mm (0.39–0.51 in) long with wings 1–2 mm (0.039–0.079 in) wide. Flowering mainly occurs from September to February, and the capsule is oval and contains more or less spherical seeds about 4 mm (0.16 in) in diameter with a wing about 1 mm (0.039 in) wide.

== Taxonomy ==
This species was first formally described in 1876 by Ferdinand von Mueller who gave it the name Velleia discophora in his Fragmenta phytographiae Australiae, from a specimen collected by Jess Young "near Ularing". In 2020, Kelly Anne Shepherd and others transferred it to the genus Goodenia, based on nuclear, chloroplast and mitochondrial data. The specific epithet (discophora) means "bearing a round plate", referring to the large, round bracts.

== Distribution ==
Goodenia discophora grows in sandy and gravelly soils, often appearing after fire in southern Western Australia in the Avon Wheatbelt, Coolgardie, Geraldton Sandplains, Mallee, Murchison and Yalgoo bioregions of Western Australia.

== Conservation status ==
Cabbage poison is listed as "not threatened" by the Western Australian Government Department of Biodiversity, Conservation and Attractions.
