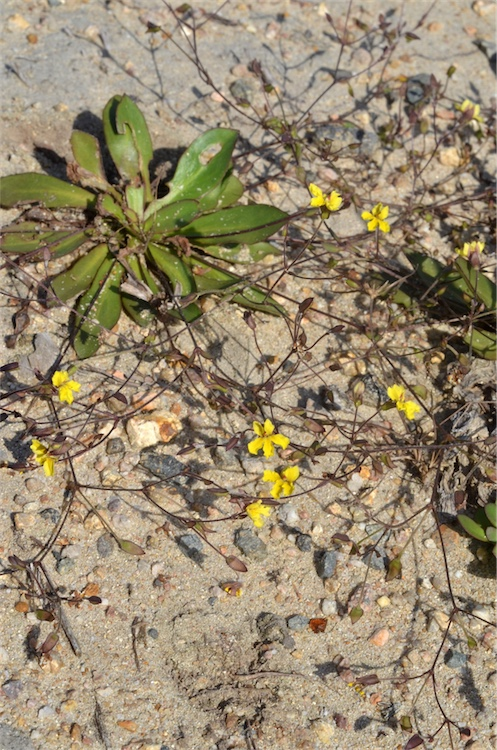
- Near Bilyana

Scientific classification
- Kingdom: Plantae
- Clade: Tracheophytes
- Clade: Angiosperms
- Clade: Eudicots
- Clade: Asterids
- Order: Asterales
- Family: Goodeniaceae
- Genus: Goodenia
- Species: G. mystrophylla

Binomial name
- Goodenia mystrophylla K.A.Sheph.
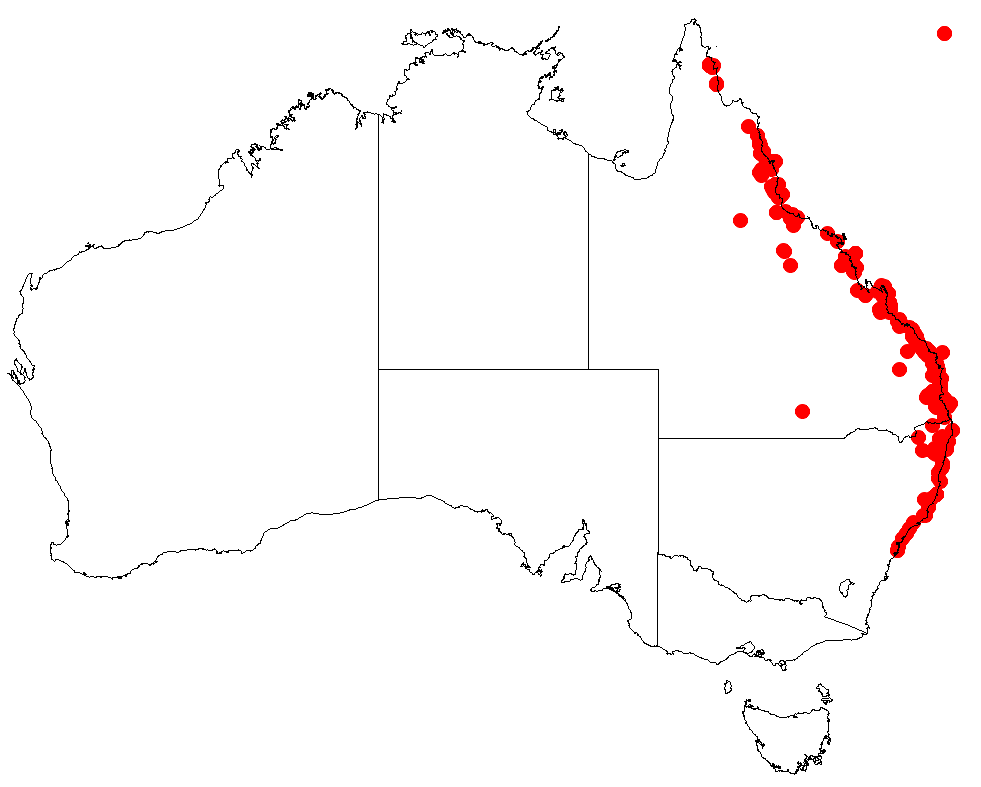
- Collections data from the AVH

Synonyms
- Velleia spathulata R.Br.

= Goodenia mystrophylla =

Species of flowering plant

Goodenia mystrophylla is a flowering plant in the family Goodeniaceae and is native to eastern Australia and New Guinea. It is a small, perennial herb with lance-shaped leaves, prostrate or low-lying flower stems and yellow flowers with purplish markings.

== Description ==
Goodenia mystrophylla is a perennial herb with lance-shaped leaves, the narrower end towards the base, up to 100 mm (3.9 in) long and 25 mm (0.98 in) wide, sometimes with toothed edges. The flowers are yellow with purplish markings, 6–11 mm (0.24–0.43 in) long with bracteoles up to 12 mm (0.47 in) long at the base, on a low-lying or prostrate flowering stem up to 250 mm (9.8 in) long. The lower sepal is oblong to more or less heart-shaped, 4–6 mm (0.16–0.24 in) long and the wings are about 1 mm (0.039 in) wide. Flowering occurs in most months and the capsule is oval, containing a round seed 1.5 mm (0.059 in) in diameter.

== Taxonomy ==
This species was first described in 1810 by Robert Brown who gave it the name Velleia spathulata in his Prodromus Florae Novae Hollandiae et Insulae Van Diemen. In 2020, Kelly Anne Shepherd and others transferred it to the genus Goodenia but the name G. spathulata was unavailable as it was preoccupied by a species described by de Vriese, (now known as Goodenia bellidifolia). Shepherd named the new species G. mystrophylla. The specific epithet (mystrophylla) is derived from the Greek language, referring to the oblanceolate or "spoon shape" of the leaves.

== Distribution and habitat ==
Goodenia mystrophylla grows in sandy soil, usually on sand dunes, from Cape York in Queensland to Narrabeen in New South Wales. It also occurs in western New Guinea and in the Louisiade Archipelago.
