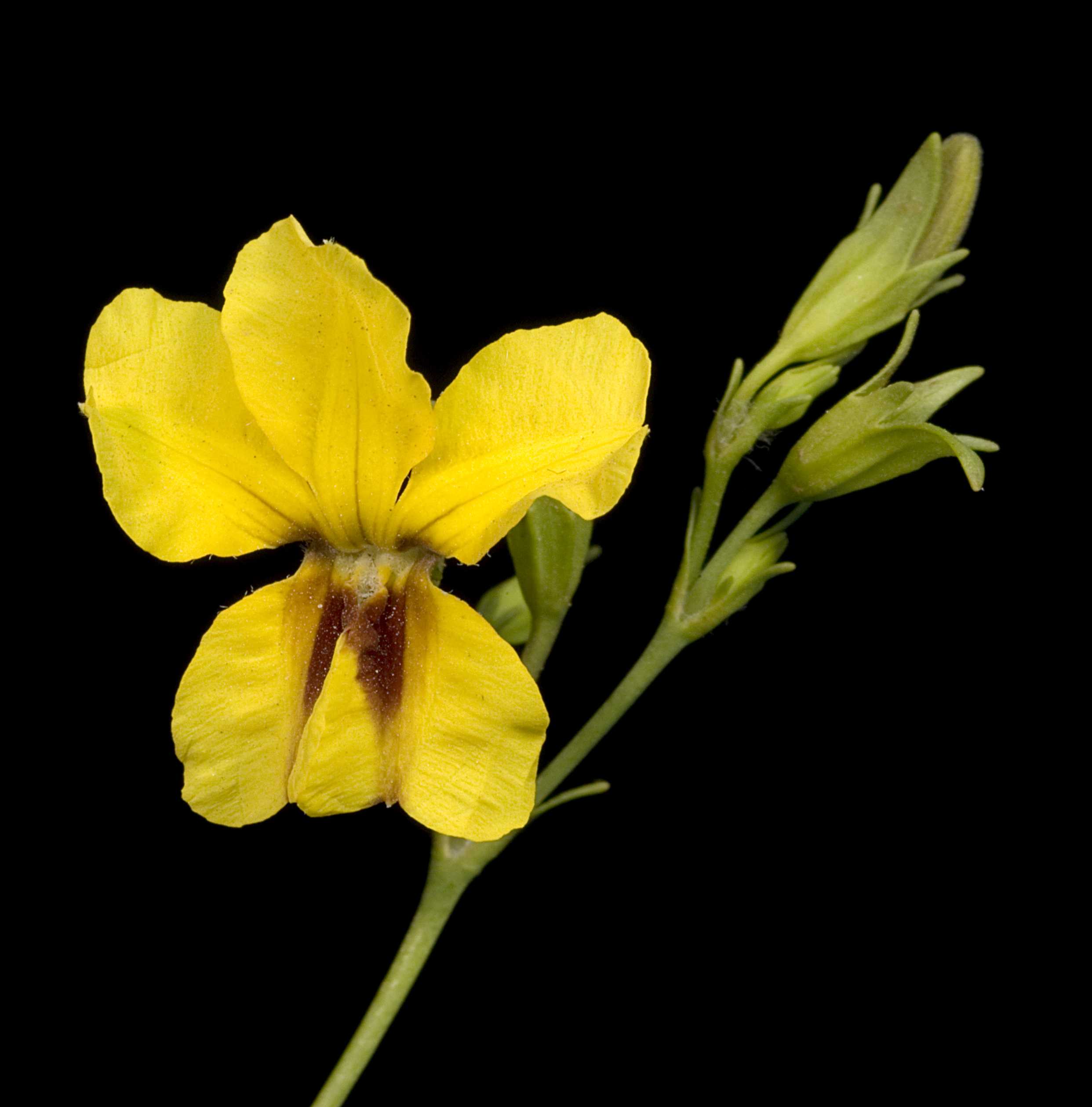
- Goodenia macrophylla

Scientific classification
- Kingdom: Plantae
- Clade: Tracheophytes
- Clade: Angiosperms
- Clade: Eudicots
- Clade: Asterids
- Order: Asterales
- Family: Goodeniaceae
- Genus: Goodenia
- Species: G. macrophylla

Binomial name
- Goodenia macrophylla (Lindl.) F.Muell.
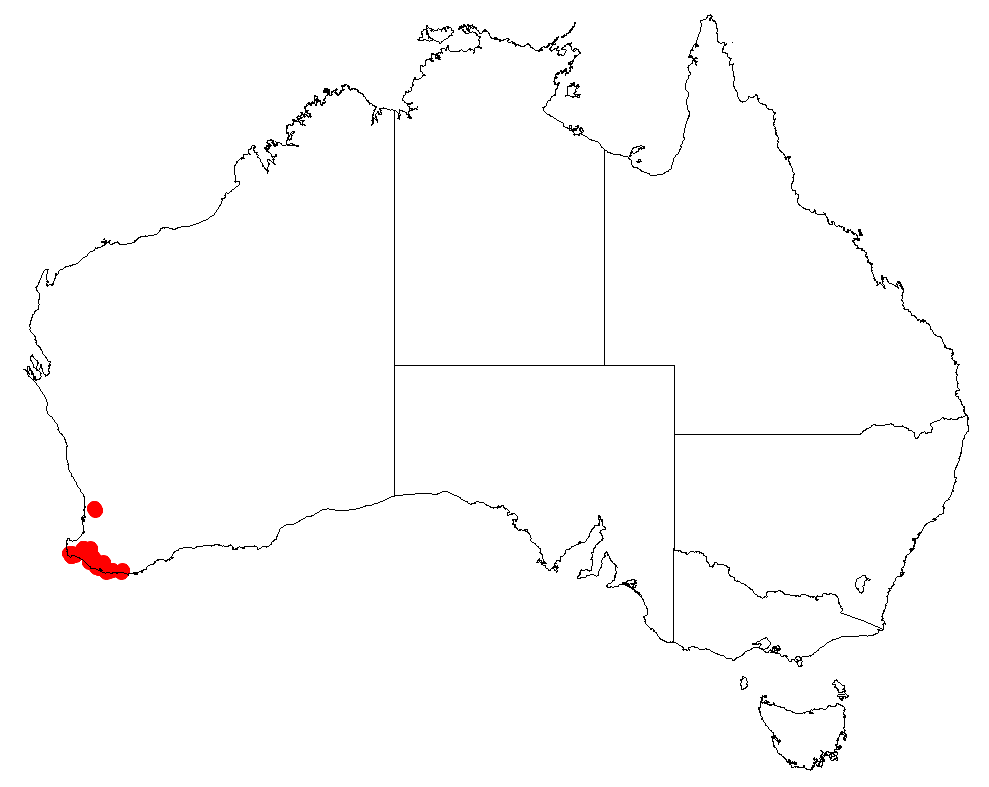
- Occurrence data for V. macrophylla from AVH

Synonyms
- Euthales macrophylla Lindl. Velleia macrophylla (Lindl.) Benth.

= Goodenia macrophylla =

Species of flowering plant

Goodenia macrophylla, or large-leaved velleia, is a species of flowering plant in the family Goodeniaceae, and is endemic to the south-west of Western Australia. It is a glabrous perennial plant with egg-shaped to elliptic leaves with toothed edges, and yellow flowers.

== Description ==
Goodenia macrophylla is a glabrous perennial plant with stems up to 1 m (3 ft 3 in) tall with stem leaves that egg-shaped with the narrower end towards the base or elliptic, 50–200 mm (2.0–7.9 in) long and 5–80 mm (0.20–3.15 in) wide with toothed edges. The flowers are arranged on a flowering stem up to 500 mm (20 in) long, with linear to lance-shaped bracteoles up to 13 mm (0.51 in) long at the base. The lower sepal is oblong, up to 7 mm (0.28 in) long. The petals are yellow 10–16 mm (0.39–0.63 in) long and hairy, the centre lobes 5–8 mm (0.20–0.31 in) long and the outer lobes 6–10 mm (0.24–0.39 in) long with wings on both sides, the wings on the narrower side 2 mm (0.079 in) long and 2.4 mm (0.094 in) long on the broader side. The style is 4.0–4.5 mm (0.16–0.18 in) long and hairy. Flowering mainly occurs from November to January and the fruit contains seeds that are about 4 mm (0.16 in) long.

== Taxonomy ==
This species was first described in 1840 by John Lindley, who gave it the name Euthales macrophylla in Edwards's Botanical Register from plants grown from seeds in the garden of the Royal Horticultural Society, the seeds having been collected in the Swan River Colony by James Drummond. In 1867, Ferdinand von Mueller transferred the species to Goodenia as G. macrophylla in his Fragmenta Phytographiae Australiae. The specific epithet (macrophylla) means "large-leaved".

== Distribution and habitat ==
Large-leaved velleia is found in the Jarrah Forest and Warren bioregions in the extreme south-west of Western Australia.
