= Goodenia filiformis =

Thread-leaved goodenia

Scientific classification
- Kingdom: Plantae
- Clade: Tracheophytes
- Clade: Angiosperms
- Clade: Eudicots
- Clade: Asterids
- Order: Asterales
- Family: Goodeniaceae
- Genus: Goodenia
- Species: G. filiformis

Binomial name
- Goodenia filiformis R.Br.

Synonyms
- Velleia lanceolata Lindl.

Species of plant

Goodenia filiformis, commonly known as thread-leaved goodenia, is a species of flowering plant in the family Goodeniaceae and is endemic to near-coastal areas of south-western Western Australia. It is an erect to ascending herb with cylindrical to narrow linear leaves at the base of the plant and racemes of yellow flowers.

== Description ==
Goodenia filiformis is an erect to ascending herb that typically grows to a height of 10–25 cm (3.9–9.8 in) with cylindrical to narrow linear leaves 40–90 mm (1.6–3.5 in) long and 0.5–1 mm (0.020–0.039 in) wide at the base of the plant. The flowers are arranged in racemes up to 80 mm (3.1 in) long with leaf-like bracts on the base, each flower on a pedicel 10–40 mm (0.39–1.57 in) long. The sepals are egg-shaped, about 1.5 mm (0.059 in) long, the corolla yellow, about 10 mm (0.39 in) long. The lower lobes of the corolla are about 4 mm (0.16 in) long with wings up to 1.5 mm (0.059 in) wide. Flowering occurs from November to December or January.

== Taxonomy and naming ==
Goodenia filiformis was first formally described in 1810 by Robert Brown in Prodromus Florae Novae Hollandiae et Insulae Van Diemen. The specific epithet (filiformis) means "thread-shaped".

== Distribution and habitat ==
This goodenia grows in winter-wet places in near-coastal areas between Princess Royal Harbour and West Cape Howe in the south-west of Western Australia.

== Conservation status ==
Goodenia filiformis is classified as "not threatened" by the Government of Western Australia Department of Parks and Wildlife.
