= PhytoKeys =

Peer-reviewed scientific journal

- Discipline: Systematic botany
- Language: English
- Edited by: W. John Kress

Publication details
- History: Since 2010
- Publisher: Pensoft
- Frequency: Continuous
- Open access: Yes
- License: CC BY 4.0
- Impact factor: 1.6 (2025)

Standard abbreviations
- ISO 4: PhytoKeys

Indexing
- ISSN: 1314-2011 (print); 1314-2003 (web)
- LCCN: 2011243672
- OCLC no.: 694733965

Links
- Journal homepage; Online archive

PhytoKeys is a peer-reviewed open-access scientific journal covering systematic botany. It is published by Pensoft.

== Notable articles ==
- Manley, Debra L.; Lichter Marck, Isaac H.; Peralta, Keily; Castro Castro, Arturo; Wogan, Kelsey A.; Whiting, Carolyn V.; Powell, A. Michael (2025). "Ovicula biradiata, a new genus of Compositae from Big Bend National Park in Trans-Pecos Texas". PhytoKeys (252): 141–162. Bibcode:2025PhytK.252..141M. doi:10.3897/phytokeys.252.137624. PMC 11862897. PMID 40012742.
- Mar, Shek Shing; Saunders, Richard (4 February 2015). "Thismia hongkongensis (Thismiaceae): a new mycoheterotrophic species from Hong Kong, China, with observations on floral visitors and seed dispersal". PhytoKeys (46): 21–33. Bibcode:2015PhytK..46...21M. doi:10.3897/phytokeys.46.8963. PMC 4391955. PMID 25878547.
- Pitman, Nigel C. A.; White, Dawson; Guevara Andino, Juan Ernesto; Couvreur, Thomas; Fortier, Riley; Zapata, José; Cornejo, Xavier; Clark, John L.; Feeley, Kenneth; Johnston, Mark K.; Lozinguez, Alix; Rivas-Torres, Gonzalo (15 April 2022). "Rediscovery of Gasteranthus extinctus L.E.Skog & L.P.Kvist (Gesneriaceae) at multiple sites in western Ecuador". PhytoKeys (194): 33–46. Bibcode:2022PhytK.194...33P. doi:10.3897/phytokeys.194.79638. PMC 9033745. PMID 35586327.
