= De Vries =

de Vries
- Pronunciation: Dutch: [də ˈvris]
- Language: Dutch

Origin
- Meaning: The Frisian
- Region of origin: Netherlands

Other names
- Variant forms: DeVries, Devries, Vries

De Vries is one of the most common Dutch surnames. It indicates a geographical origin: "Vriesland" is an old spelling of the Dutch province of Friesland (Frisia). Hence, "de Vries" means "the Frisian". The name has been modified to "DeVries", "deVries", or "Devries" in other countries.

People named De Vries:

== Academics ==
- Annelou de Vries, Dutch academic and child psychiatrist
- Barend de Vries (1925–2010) – Dutch economist at the World Bank
- Benjamin de Vries (born 1923) – Dutch-Israeli economic historian
- Gerda de Vries, Canadian mathematician
- Glen de Vries (1971–2021) – American medical entrepreneur
- Gustav de Vries (1866–1934) – Dutch mathematician
- Hans de Vries (1927–2021) – Dutch economic historian
- Hent de Vries (born 1958) – Dutch philosopher
- Hessel de Vries (1916–1959) – Dutch physicist
- Hugo de Vries (1848–1935) – Dutch botanist and geneticist
- Jan de Vries (philologist) (1890–1964) – Dutch Germanic mythologist
- Jan de Vries (historian) (1943) – Dutch-American historian
- Jouke de Vries (born 1960) – Dutch University Dean
- Jurn de Vries (born 1940) – Dutch theologian and journalist
- Keith DeVries (1937–2006) – American archaeologist
- Kelly DeVries (born 1956) – American medievalist historian
- Marc de Vries (born 1958) – Dutch physicist
- Margaret Garritsen de Vries (1922–2009) – American economist
- Philip James DeVries (born 1952) – American entomologist and evolutionary ecologist
- Rheta Devries (1936–2012) – American educator
- Ronald P. de Vries (born 196?); mycologist
- Susanna de Vries (born 1936) – Australian historian
- Warren DeVries – American mechanical engineer
- Willem deVries – (born 1950) – American philosopher

== Arts, acting, music ==
- Abraham de Vries (painter) (c. 1590 – 1649/50) – Dutch portrait painter
- Adriaen de Vries (1556–1626) – Dutch sculptor
- Andrew DeVries (born 1957) – American painter and sculptor
- Bouke de Vries (born 1960) – Dutch ceramist in England
- Casper de Vries (born 1964) – South African comedian
- David Devriès (1881–1936) – French lyric operatic tenor
- David de Vries (born 1961) – Australian film and comic book maker
- Dolf de Vries (1937–2020) – Dutch actor
- Doug de Vries (born 1960) – Australian guitarist
- Erwin de Vries (1929–2018) – Surinamese painter and sculptor
- Han de Vries (born 1941) – Dutch oboist
- Hendrik de Vries (1896–1989) – Dutch poet and painter
- Henri de Vries (1864–1949) – Dutch film actor
- Herman de Vries (born 1931) – Dutch artist
- Jill De Vries (born 1953) – American model
- John DeVries (1915–1992) – American lyricist
- John de Vries (born 1946) – Dutch car designer
- Klaas de Vries (composer) (born 1944) – Dutch composer
- Leondre Devries (born 2000) – British pop singer
- Louis de Vries (1905–1935) – Dutch jazz trumpeter
- Marius De Vries (born 1961) – English music producer
- Matt DeVries (born 1977) – American guitarist
- Nathalie de Vries (born 1965) – Dutch architect
- Roelof de Vries (1631 – c. 1690) – Dutch landscape painter
- Rosa de Vries-van Os (1828–1889) – Dutch operatic singer
- Simon de Vries (1570–75 – 1628/29) – Dutch engraver better known as Frisius

== Politics and religion ==
- Abraham de Vries (minister) (1773–1862) – Dutch Mennonite minister
- Albert de Vries (born 1955) – Dutch politician
- Aukje de Vries (born 1964) – Dutch politician
- Bert de Vries (born 1938) – Dutch CDA politician
- Betsi DeVries (born 1952) – American (New Hampshire) politician
- Bibi de Vries (born 1963) – Dutch VVD politician
- Christoph de Vries (born 1974), German politician
- Cornelis de Vries (1740–1812) – Dutch Mennonite minister
- Erica de Vries, American politician
- George Devries (1896–1957) – Australian (Queensland) politician
- Gerrit de Vries (politician) (1818–1900) – Dutch prime minister
- Gijs de Vries (born 1956) – Dutch politician
- Henry Lucien de Vries (1909–1987) – Surinamese politician and entrepreneur
- Jack de Vries (born 1968) – Dutch CDA politician
- Jannewietske de Vries (born 1961) – Dutch (Friesland) politician
- John Devries (Yukon politician) (born 1945) – Canadian (Yukon) politician
- Kees de Vries (born 1955), German/Dutch politician (CDU)
- Klaas de Vries (Christian Democratic Appeal) (1917–1999) – Dutch politician
- Klaas de Vries (Labour Party) (born 1943) – Dutch politician
- Marion De Vries (1865–1939) – American politician
- Monique de Vries (born 1947) – Dutch VVD politician
- Walter DeVries (1929–2019) – American political consultant

== Sports ==
- Alida de Vries (1914–2007) – Dutch sprinter
- Anita Valen de Vries (born 1968), Norwegian racing cyclist
- Ann Devries (born 1970) – Belgian tennis player
- Berden de Vries (born 1989) – Dutch racing cyclist
- Bob de Vries (born 1984) – Dutch speed skater
- Carl E. DeVries (1921–2010) – American football coach
- Cole De Vries (born 1985) – American baseball pitcher
- A family of American sportspeople:
  - Darian DeVries (born 1975) – basketball coach (older brother)
  - Jared DeVries (born 1976) – American football player (younger brother)
  - Tucker DeVries (born 2002) – basketball player (son of Darian)
- Dorien de Vries (born 1965) – Dutch competitive sailor
- Dorus de Vries (born 1980) – Dutch football goalkeeper
- Douwe de Vries (born 1982) – Dutch speed skater
- Elma de Vries (born 1983) – Dutch speed skater
- Feike de Vries (born 1943) – Dutch water polo player
- Floris de Vries (born 1989) – Dutch golfer
- Francis de Vries (born 1994) – New Zealand footballer
- François De Vries (1913–1972) – Belgian footballer
- Gerrit de Vries (cyclist) (born 1967) – Dutch road cyclist
- Greg de Vries (born 1973) – Canadian hockey player
- Jack de Vries (soccer) (born 2002) – American soccer player
- Jan de Vries (athlete) (1896–1939) – Dutch sprinter
- Jan de Vries (motorcyclist) (1944–2021) – Dutch motorcycle road racer
- Jan-Lodewijk de Vries (born 1972) – Dutch water polo player
- Jeroen de Vries (born 1971) – Dutch speed skater
- John de Vries (born 1966) – Australian racecar driver
- Johnny de Vries (born 1990) – Dutch footballer
- Kristi de Vries (born 1982) – Dutch softball player
- Leo De Vries (born 2006) – Dominican-Dutch baseball player
- Lianne de Vries (born 1990) – Dutch footballer
- Linda de Vries (born 1988) – Dutch speed skater
- Marijn de Vries (born 1978) – Dutch racing cyclist and journalist
- Mark de Vries (born 1975) – Dutch footballer
- Martijn de Vries (born 1992) – Dutch footballer
- Martin de Vries (born 1960) – Dutch basketball player
- Mered de Vries (born 1977) – Dutch volleyballer
- Michelle de Vries (born 1961) – Australian swimmer
- Myles de Vries (born 1940) – English cricketer
- Nyck de Vries (born 1995) – Dutch racing driver
- Paul de Vries (born 1996) – Ghanaian footballer
- Raimo de Vries (born 1969) – Dutch footballer
- Remon de Vries (born 1979) – Dutch footballer
- Rianne de Vries (born 1990) – Dutch speed skater
- Rika de Vries (born 1974) – Dutch sitting volleyball player
- Roger DeVries (born 1950) – English footballer
- Ruan de Vries (born 1986) – South African hurdler
- Ryan De Vries (born 1992) – New Zealand footballer
- Sjerstin de Vries-Vermeulen (born 1972/73) – Dutch swimmer and equestrian
- Steve DeVries (born 1964) – American tennis player
- Tjark de Vries (born 1965) – Dutch rower
- Troy DeVries (born 1982) – American basketball player
- Vikki de Vries (born 1964) – American figure skater
- Vincent de Vries (born 1994) – Dutch badminton player

== Writing and journalism ==
- Abe de Vries (born 1965) – Dutch West Frisian-language writer and poet
- Abraham H. de Vries (born 1937) – Afrikaans author
- Anke de Vries (born 1936) – Dutch youth writer
- Anne de Vries (1904–1964) – Dutch author
- Maggie De Vries (born 1961) – Canadian writer
- Peter De Vries (1910–1993) – American editor and comic novelist
- Peter R. de Vries (1956–2021) – Dutch journalist
- Rachel Guido deVries (born 1947) – American poet and novelist
- Stefan de Vries (born 1970) – Dutch writer and journalist
- Theun de Vries (1907–2005) – Dutch writer and poet

== Other ==
- David Pietersz. de Vries (c. 1593 – 1665) – Dutch navigator and New Netherland patroon
- Glen de Vries (1972–2021) – American businessman
- Hidde Sjoerds de Vries (1645–1694)— Dutch admiral
- Jan de Vries (soldier) (1924–2012) – Canadian veteran's advocate
- Lini De Vries (1905–1982) – Dutch-born American public health nurse in Mexico
- Maarten Gerritsz Vries (or "de Vries") (1589–1647) – Dutch cartographer and explorer
- Mike de Vries (born 1958) – German businessman
- Nina de Vries (born 1961) – Dutch sex worker
- Roel de Vries (born 1968) – Dutch engineer and businessman in Japan
- Roland de Vries – South African Army officer
- Tara De Vries (born 1999) – Turkish-Dutch beauty pageant
- Tjerk Hiddes de Vries (1622–1666) – Dutch admiral and naval hero
- William DeVries (born 1943) – American surgeon who performed first permanent artificial heart transplant

== Compound surnames ==
- Manfred F.R. Kets de Vries (born 1943) – Dutch author and researcher
- Daniel Rooseboom de Vries (born 1980) – Dutch freestyle footballer
- Hans Vredeman de Vries (1527–1607) – Dutch architect
- Jacob Vredeman de Vries (1588–1621) – Dutch kapellmeister and composer
- Paul Vredeman de Vries (1567–1617) – Flemish painter and draughtsman
- Salomon Vredeman de Vries (1556–1604) – Flemish painter and draughtsman
- Herman de Vries de Heekelingen (1880–1942) – Dutch archaeologist and historian
- Gerard de Vries Lentsch (1883–1973) – Dutch competitive sailor
- Willem de Vries Lentsch (1886–1980) – Dutch competitive sailor
- Wim de Vries Lentsch (1914–2007) – Dutch competitive sailor
- Hans Dirk de Vries Reilingh (1908–2001) – Dutch geographer
- Boyd van der Vuurst de Vries (born 1999) – Dutch basketball player
- Keye van der Vuurst de Vries (born 2001) – Dutch basketball player
- Piet van Wyk de Vries (born 1972) – South African songwriter

== Fictional people ==
- Alicia DeVries – drop commando and captain of the alpha synth starship Megaera from the novel Path of the Fury by David Weber
- Cassandra de Vries – director of the dataDyne corporation from the Perfect Dark video game series
- Hugo De Vries – an adversary of Inspector Morse, featured in the episode Masonic Mysteries
- Piter De Vries – a twisted Mentat in the 1965 novel Dune
- Tissaia de Vries – a sorceress in The Witcher series
- Leon De Vries – South African mining supervisor and secondary antagonist in the 2020 horror game Amnesia: Rebirth

== See also ==
- Vries (surname), list of people with the similar surname
- Devriès family, a family of American and later French operatic singers, descendants of Rosa de Vries-van Os
- Korteweg–de Vries equation, a wave model co-discovered by Gustav de Vries
- Tussenvoegsel, the prepositions and/or articles in Dutch surnames
