= De Vries (disambiguation) =

De Vries is one of the most common Dutch surnames.

De Vries may also refer to:

- De Vries (crater), lunar impact crater on the Moon
- De Vries–Fransen van de Putte cabinet, cabinet of the Netherlands from 6 July 1872 until 27 August 1873
- De Vries Palisade, archaeological site in Lewes, Sussex County, Delaware
- Bouke de Vries, London-based Dutch artist specializing in Ceramic art and porcelain
- Koolen–De Vries syndrome, rare genetic disorder
- De Vries, Ibarra & Co., importers and shop, in Boston, Massachusetts, United States of America
