= Vries =

Vries may refer to:

- Vries (surname), list of people with the surname Vries
- Vries, Netherlands, a village in the Dutch province of Drenthe

== See also ==
- De Vries
