= De Vreese =

- Pronunciation: Dutch: [də ˈvreːsə]
- Language: Flemish

Origin
- Meaning: The Frisian
- Region of origin: Belgium

Other names
- Variant forms: Devriese, de Vriese, de Vrieze

De Vreese is a Flemish surname. It is one of several Belgian equivalents of the much more numerous Dutch family name De Vries. Notable people with this family name include:

- Alphonse De Vreese (1922–2011), French racing cyclist
- Claes de Vreese (born 1974), Danish academic of Dutch origin
- Laurens De Vreese (born 1988), Belgian road bicycle racer
