= Roel de Vries =

Roel de Vries is the name of:

- Roel de Vries (engineer) (born 1968), Dutch engineer and businessman
- Roel de Vries (trade unionist) (born 1943), former Dutch trade union leader
