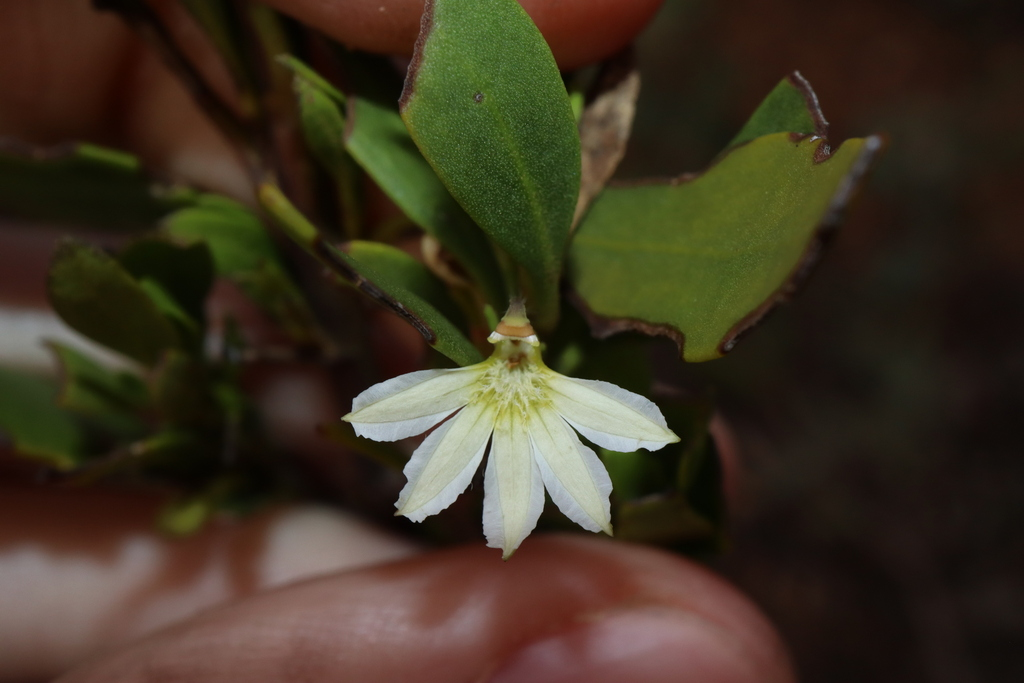

Scientific classification
- Kingdom: Plantae
- Clade: Embryophytes
- Clade: Tracheophytes
- Clade: Spermatophytes
- Clade: Angiosperms
- Clade: Eudicots
- Clade: Asterids
- Order: Asterales
- Family: Goodeniaceae
- Genus: Scaevola
- Species: S. myrtifolia

Binomial name
- Scaevola myrtifolia (de Vriese) K.Krause
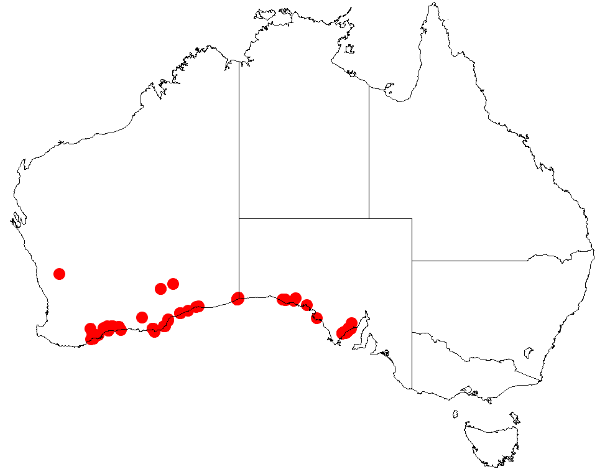
- Occurrence data from AVH

Synonyms
- Lobelia myrtifolia (de Vriese) Kuntze; Merkusia myrtifolia de Vriese; Scaevola groeneri F.Muell.; Scaevola groenerii F.Muell. orth. var.; Scaevola myrtifolia (de Vriese) Druce isonym; Merkusia linearis (R.Br.) de Vriese

= Scaevola myrtifolia =

Species of shrub

Scaevola myrtifolia is a species of flowering plant in the family Goodeniaceae and is endemic to coastal areas of south-western Australia. It is a spreading, slightly sticky shrub with elliptic to oblong leaves, sometimes with a few teeth on the edges, white flowers sometimes singly or in cymes in leaf axils, and glabrous, green, cylindrical fruit.

== Description ==
Scaevola myrtifolia is a spreading shrub that typically grows to a height of 0.4–1.5 m (1 ft 4 in – 4 ft 11 in) and is slightly sticky when young, with scattered, more or less star-shaped hairs. Its leaves are elliptic to oblong, sometimes with a few teeth on the edges, 17–40 mm (0.67–1.57 in) long and 1–12 mm (0.039–0.472 in) wide on a short petiole. The flowers are borne singly or in cymes in leaf axils on a peduncle up to 5 mm (0.20 in) long, with linear bracteoles 5–8 mm (0.20–0.31 in) long. The sepals are joined to form a tube about 1 mm (0.039 in) long, and the petals 13–16 mm (0.51–0.63 in) long and white, glabrous or sparsely hairy outside and bearded inside. Flowering mainly occurs from May to October, and the fruit is about 3 mm (0.12 in) long, rough, green and glabrous.

== Taxonomy ==
This species was first formally described in 1854 by Willem Hendrik de Vriese who gave it the name Merkusia myrtifolia in the journal Natuurkundige verhandelingen van de Hollandsche Maatschappij der Wetenschappen te Haarlem. In 1912, Kurt Krause transferred the species to Scaevola as S. myrtifolia in Engler's Das Pflanzenreich. The specific epithet (myrtifolia) means 'myrtle-leaved'.

== Distribution ==
Scaevola myrtifolia grows in stony soil, often over limestone, in mallee in near coastal areas from near Albany in Western Australia to the Eyre Peninsula in South Australia.
