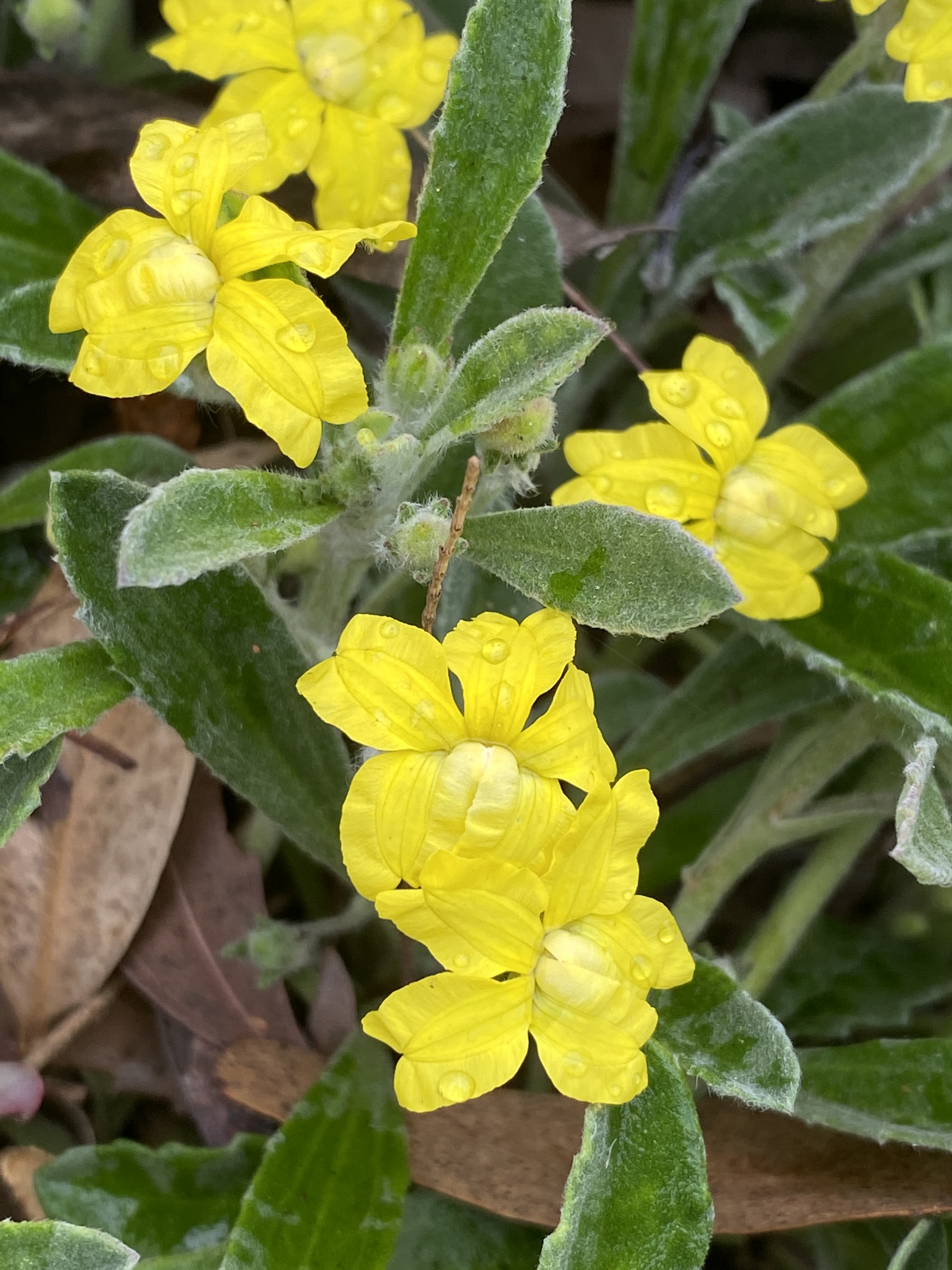
- In the Australian National Botanic Gardens

Scientific classification
- Kingdom: Plantae
- Clade: Embryophytes
- Clade: Tracheophytes
- Clade: Spermatophytes
- Clade: Angiosperms
- Clade: Eudicots
- Clade: Asterids
- Order: Asterales
- Family: Goodeniaceae
- Genus: Goodenia
- Species: G. affinis

Binomial name
- Goodenia affinis de Vriese

Synonyms
- Goodenia grandiflora var. albiflora (Schltdl.) K.Krause; Picrophyta albiflora (Schltdl.) F.Muell.

= Goodenia affinis =

Silver goodenia

Species of plant

Goodenia affinis, commonly known as silver goodenia, is a species of flowering plant in the family Goodeniaceae and endemic to the southwest of Western Australia. It is an erect to low-lying, perennial herb with oblong to egg-shaped leaves, mostly at the base of the plant, racemes of yellow flowers with linear bracteoles at the base, and oblong fruit.

== Description ==
Goodenia affinis is an erect to low-lying, usually perennial herb with stems up to 200 mm (7.9 in) long. The leaves are mostly basal, oblong to egg-shaped, 20–40 mm (0.79–1.57 in) long and 5–12 mm (0.20–0.47 in) wide, with small teeth on the edges and hairy on both sides. The flowers are arranged singly or in racemes up to 50 mm (2.0 in) long on a peduncle 10–20 mm (0.39–0.79 in) long with linear bracteoles 4–8 mm (0.16–0.31 in) long at the base, each flower on a pedicel 10–20 mm (0.39–0.79 in) long. The sepals are narrow oblong to egg-shaped, 2–3 mm (0.079–0.118 in) long and the corolla is yellow, 12–15 mm (0.47–0.59 in) long with a few hairs inside. The lower lobes of the corolla are 7–8 mm (0.28–0.31 in) long with wings about 1.5 mm (0.059 in) wide. Flowering mainly occurs from July to December and the fruit is an oblong capsule 10–12 mm (0.39–0.47 in) long.

== Taxonomy and naming ==
Silver goodenia was first formally described in 1845 by Willem Hendrik de Vriese and given the name Scaevola geniculata in Johann Georg Christian Lehmann's book Plantae Preissianae. In 1854, de Vriese changed the name to Goodenia affinis in the journal Natuurkundige Verhandelingen van de Hollandsche Maatschappij der Wetenschappen te Haarlem. The specific epithet (affinis) means "similar to a closely-related species".

== Distribution and habitat ==
Goodenia affinis grows in mallee from King George Sound to the western end of the Great Australian Bight in the Avon Wheatbelt, Coolgardie, Esperance Plains, Geraldton Sandplains and Mallee biogeographic regions in the southwest of Western Australia.
