= Devry (disambiguation) =

Devry may refer to:

- DeVry Inc, U.S. corporation renamed to Adtalem Global Education in 2018, that runs for-profit schools
- DeVry University
- Elaine Devry (born 1930), American actress
- William deVry (born 1968), Canadian actor

== See also ==
- De Vries
