= Galip Ulsoy =

Turkish American academic (born 1950)

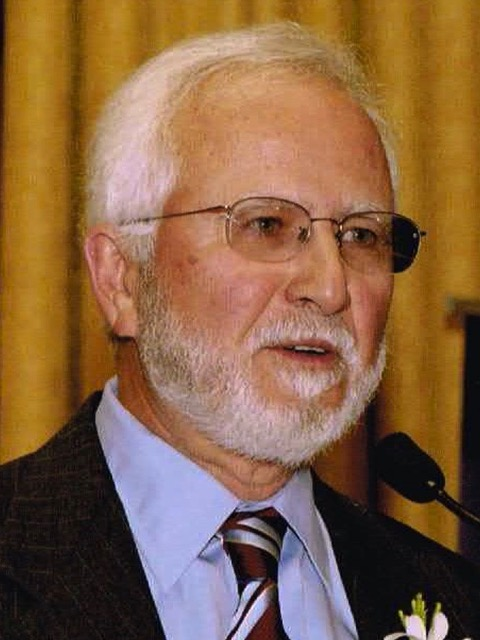
- Born: 1950 (age 75–76); Kozlu, Zonguldak, Turkey
- Education: Swarthmore College, Cornell University, University of California, Berkeley
- Awards: Member of the National Academy of Engineering; Fellow of the American Society of Mechanical Engineers (ASME); Fellow of the Society of Manufacturing Engineers (SME); IEEE Fellow; Special Award from the TÜBİTAK
- Scientific career
- Fields: Manufacturing; Robotics
- Workplaces: University of Michigan
- Thesis: Vibration and Stability of Bandsaw Blades (1979)
- Doctoral advisor: C. Daniel Mote Jr.
- Doctoral students: Diane L. Peters

Ali Galip Ulsoy (born 1950) is an academic at the University of Michigan (UM), Ann Arbor, where he is the C.D. Mote Jr. Distinguished University Professor Emeritus of Mechanical Engineering and the William Clay Ford Professor Emeritus of Manufacturing.

For his work on dynamic modeling, analysis and control of mechanical systems he was made a fellow of SME, ASME, IFAC and IEEE. He is also a member of the NAE. In 2012 he received a Presidential Special Award from TÜBİTAK.

== Early life and education ==
Galip Ulsoy was born in Kozlu, Zonguldak, Turkey where he started elementary school. His family then immigrated to the USA in 1957, before returning to Turkey in 1963. He completed his middle school education at the English High School for Boys in 1966 and his high school education at Robert College in 1969, both in Istanbul, Turkey.

He received a B.S. in Engineering from Swarthmore College in 1973. His M.S. in Mechanical Engineering was received from Cornell University in 1975. Ulsoy continued his Ph.D. studies in Mechanical Engineering at the University of California at Berkeley and graduated in 1979. His thesis on Vibration and Stability of Bandsaw Blades was supervised by C. Daniel Mote Jr.

== Career ==
Ulsoy was a Postdoctoral Fellow at the Department of Material Science & Mineral Engineering in the University of California, Berkeley in 1979, A year later he joined the Department of Mechanical Engineering at the University of Michigan as an assistant professor. He was promoted to associate professor in 1986, and to full professor in 1992. In the years 1998-2001 Ulsoy served as the Chair of the Mechanical Engineering department at the University of Michigan. During the years 1996-2016 Ulsoy held the William Clay Ford Professor of Manufacturing chair, and during 2009-2016 he was the C.D. Mote Jr. Distinguished University Professor of Mechanical Engineering. He retired in 2016 as an emeritus professor.

Ulsoy was the founding director of the Ground Robotics Reliability Center and Founding Deputy Director of the NSF Engineering Research Center for Reconfigurable Manufacturing System at the University of Michigan. He was also Director of the Division of Civil and Mechanical Systems at the National Science Foundation, Arlington, Virginia, and a Visiting Researcher at the Ford Scientific Research Laboratories, Dearborn, Michigan.

He was also the founding editor of ASME Dynamic Systems and Control Magazine, and served as Editor of the ASME Transactions, Journal of Dynamic Systems, Measurement and Control, and as a member of the editorial board for several international journals. Ulsoy also served as the President of the American Automatic Control Council, which is the member organization representing the US in the International Federation of Automatic Control (IFAC).

He was a consultant for various companies and organizations, including: National Science Foundation, Ford Motor Company, Cummins Engine Company, General Motors, LG Production Research, Swedish National Board for Industrial and Technical Development, Sughrue Mion.

During his career, Ulsoy has advised 47 doctoral students and was co-author of five books, over 375 articles, and was a co-inventor on three USA and one European patents. According to Google Scholar (May 2022) he has more than 18,500 citations and his h-index is 68.

== Research ==
Ulsoy's research work focuses on several areas: dynamics and control (adaptive control, state derivative feedback, coupling between modeling and controller design, time-delayed systems), manufacturing automation (sawing, turning, milling, drilling, robotics, stamping), reconfigurable systems, mechatronics, automotive systems (accessory drive belts, active suspensions, vehicle lateral control) and other engineering systems, like disk drives and mineral processing operations.

His basic research contributions in dynamics and control have led to numerous best paper awards, and he is one of the first researchers to apply methods from advanced control theory to manufacturing systems.

His research work has had impact on industry: Accessory drive belts and active safety systems in automobiles worldwide utilize methods and technologies that he has developed. Reconfigurable manufacturing systems, of which he is a co-inventor, have been widely adopted in industry.

Other commercial systems influenced by his research are: design of bandsaw blades, design and control of drills, control of machine tools, automotive suspensions, stamping presses, disk drives, and ground robots.

Upon receiving the Turkish Scientific and Technological Research Council (TÜBİTAK) Special Award in 2012, his research work was described:

For his exemplary research on dynamic systems and automatic control, including dynamic analysis and control of axially rotating and translating elastic systems and application of advanced control theory to manufacturing and automotive systems.

== Publications ==
=== Books ===
- Process Control for Sheet-Metal Stamping. Advances in Industrial Control. 2014. doi:10.1007/978-1-4471-6284-1. ISBN 978-1-4471-6283-4.
- Ulsoy, A. Galip; Peng, Huei; Çakmakci, Melih (2012). Automotive Control Systems (PDF). doi:10.1017/CBO9780511844577. ISBN 978-0-511-84457-7.
- Yi, Sun; Nelson, Patrick W.; Ulsoy, A Galip (2010). Time-Delay Systems. doi:10.1142/7759. ISBN 978-981-4307-39-0.
- Ulsoy, A. Galip; DeVries, Warren R. (1989). Microcomputer Applications in Manufacturing. Wiley. ISBN 978-0-471-61189-9.
- Kannatey-Asibu, E.; Ulsoy, A.G.; Komanduri, R., eds. (1985). Sensors and Controls for Manufacturing: Presented at the Winter Annual Meeting of the American Society of Mechanical Engineers, Miami Beach, Florida, November 17-22, 1985. ASME. hdl:2027/pst.000015857644. OCLC 564575407.

=== Selected articles ===
- Duan, Molong; Ramani, Keval S.; Okwudire, Chinedum E. (28 October 2015). "Tracking Control of Non-Minimum Phase Systems Using Filtered Basis Functions: A NURBS-Based Approach". Volume 1: Adaptive and Intelligent Systems Control; Advances in Control Design Methods; Advances in Non-Linear and Optimal Control; Advances in Robotics; Advances in Wind Energy Systems; Aerospace Applications; Aerospace Power Optimization; Assistive Robotics; Automotive 2: Hybrid Electric Vehicles; Automotive 3: Internal Combustion Engines; Automotive Engine Control; Battery Management; Bio Engineering Applications; Biomed and Neural Systems; Connected Vehicles; Control of Robotic Systems. doi:10.1115/DSCC2015-9859. ISBN 978-0-7918-5724-3.
- Ghaffari, Azad; Ulsoy, A. Galip (June 2016). "Dynamic Contour Error Estimation and Feedback Modification for High-Precision Contouring". IEEE/ASME Transactions on Mechatronics. 21 (3): 1732–1741. doi:10.1109/TMECH.2015.2494518. S2CID 7366275.
- Galip Ulsoy, A. (1 April 2015). "Time-Delayed Control of SISO Systems for Improved Stability Margins". Journal of Dynamic Systems, Measurement, and Control. 137 (4). doi:10.1115/1.4028528.
- Yi, Sun; Nelson, Patrick W.; Ulsoy, A. Galip (April 2008). "Controllability and Observability of Systems of Linear Delay Differential Equations Via the Matrix Lambert W Function". IEEE Transactions on Automatic Control. 53 (3): 854–860. doi:10.1109/TAC.2008.919549. S2CID 20746351.
- Chen, Liang-Kuang; Ulsoy, A. Galip (1 December 2001). "Identification of a Driver Steering Model, and Model Uncertainty, From Driving Simulator Data". Journal of Dynamic Systems, Measurement, and Control. 123 (4): 623–629. doi:10.1115/1.1409554. S2CID 120657467.
- Fathy, H.K.; Reyer, J.A.; Papalambros, P.Y.; Ulsov, A.G. (2001). "On the coupling between the plant and controller optimization problems". Proceedings of the 2001 American Control Conference. (Cat. No.01CH37148). pp. 1864–1869 vol.3. doi:10.1109/ACC.2001.946008. ISBN 0-7803-6495-3. S2CID 14271271.
- Koren, Y.; Heisel, U.; Jovane, F.; Moriwaki, T.; Pritschow, G.; Ulsoy, G.; Van Brussel, H. (1999). "Reconfigurable Manufacturing Systems". CIRP Annals. 48 (2): 527–540. doi:10.1016/S0007-8506(07)63232-6.
- Pilutti, T.; Ulsoy, A.G. (September 1999). "Identification of driver state for lane-keeping tasks". IEEE Transactions on Systems, Man, and Cybernetics - Part A: Systems and Humans. 29 (5): 486–502. doi:10.1109/3468.784175.
- Beikmann, R. S.; Perkins, N. C.; Ulsoy, A. G. (1996). "Free Vibration of Serpentine Belt Drive Systems". Journal of Vibration and Acoustics. 118 (3): 406–413. doi:10.1115/1.2888197.
- Pakdemirli, M.; Ulsoy, A.G.; Ceranoglu, A. (January 1994). "Transverse Vibration of an Axially Accelerating String". Journal of Sound and Vibration. 169 (2): 179–196. Bibcode:1994JSV...169..179P. doi:10.1006/jsvi.1994.1012. hdl:2027.42/31834.
- Ulsoy, A. Galip; Koren, Yoram; Rasmussen, Fred (1 June 1983). "Principal Developments in the Adaptive Control of Machine Tools". Journal of Dynamic Systems, Measurement, and Control. 105 (2): 107–112. doi:10.1115/1.3149640.
- Ulsoy, A. G.; Mote, C. D. (1 February 1982). "Vibration of Wide Band Saw Blades". Journal of Engineering for Industry. 104 (1): 71–78. doi:10.1115/1.3185801.

== Honors and awards ==
- Fellow, American Society of Mechanical Engineers (ASME), 1993.
- Fellow, Society of Manufacturing Engineers (SME), 1996.
- Rudolf Kalman Best Paper Award for ASME J. Dynamic Systems, Measurement and Control, 2003 and 2016.
- Member, National Academy for Engineering, “For research on the dynamics and control of axially moving elastic materials and their implementation in automotive and manufacturing systems”, 2006.
- Albert M. Sargent Progress Award, Society of Manufacturing Engineers, 2007.
- Rufus T. Oldenburger Medal "For fundamental and wide-ranging contributions to the analysis and control of dynamic systems with a broad spectrum of applications, from automotive systems to manufacturing systems", ASME, 2008.
- Fellow, International Federation of Automatic Control (IFAC), 2010.
- Special Award from TÜBİTAK (Turkish Scientific and Technological Research Council) presented by the President of Turkey, 2012.
- Charles Russ Richards Memorial Award from ASME and Pi Tau Sigma, 2013.
- Fellow, Institute of Electrical and Electronics Engineers (IEEE) “For contributions to flexible automation and manufacturing systems”, 2013.
- Hideo Hanafusa Outstanding Investigator Award in Flexible Automation, International Symposium on Flexible Automation, Awaji Island, Japan, 2014.
- Richard E. Bellman Control Heritage Award “For seminal research contributions with industrial impact in the dynamics and control of mechanical systems especially manufacturing systems and automotive systems”, American Automatic Control Council, 2020.

== Personal life ==
Galip Ulsoy is married to Susan K. Glowski. They have one daughter, Jessie E. Ulsoy and live in Dexter, Michigan.
