= Herman de Vries de Heekelingen =

Professor emeritus Herman de Vries de Heekelingen
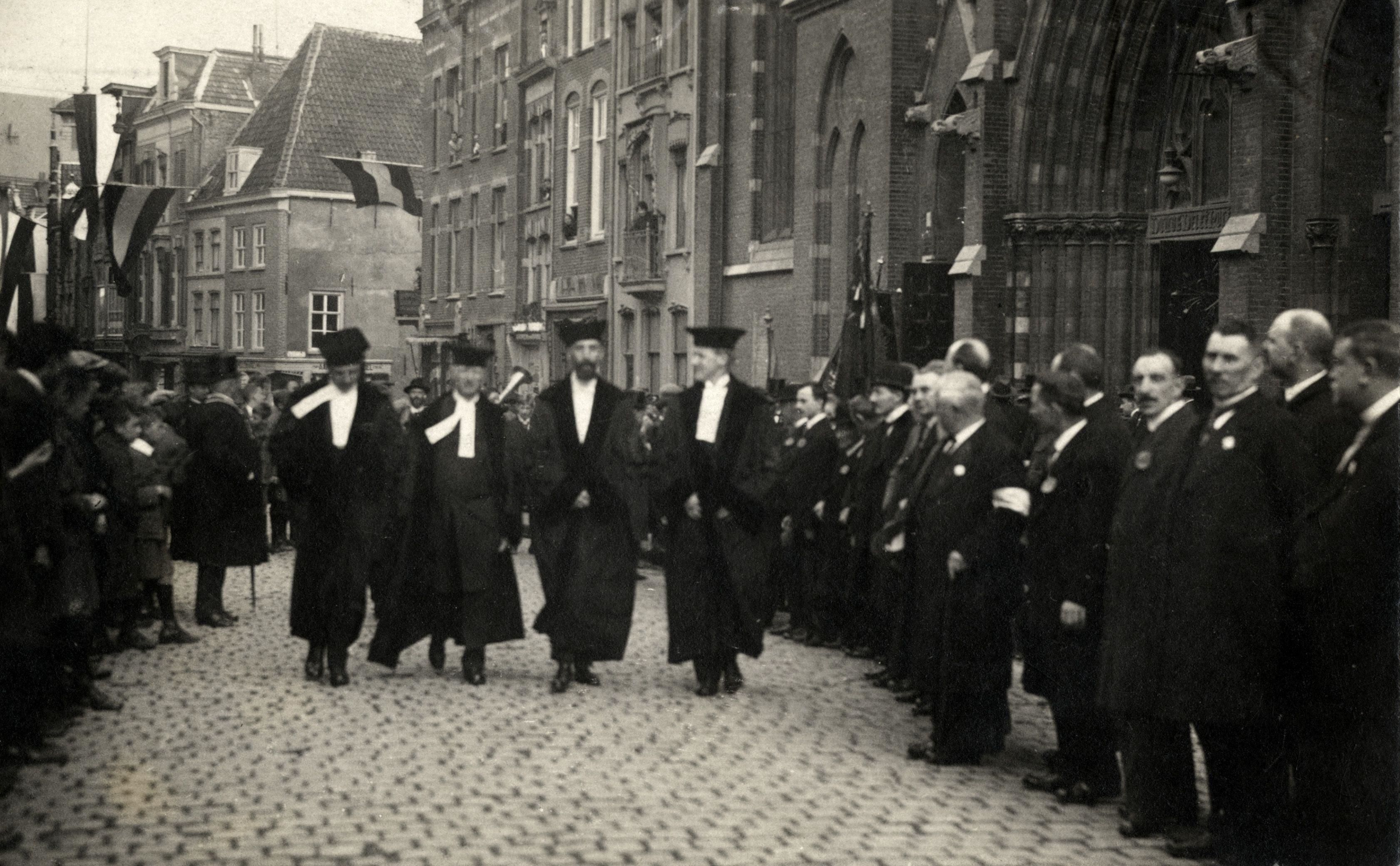
- Herman de Vries de Heekelingen (second from right) in a procession to the St. Ignatius Church at the opening of the Catholic University of Nijmegen, 17 October 1923.
- Born: 18 June 1880; Groningen, Netherlands
- Died: 27 July 1942 (aged 62); Yvorne, Vaud, Switzerland
- Citizenship: Swiss (from 1921)
- Education: Doctor of Letters
- Alma mater: University of Fribourg
- Occupations: professor, author
- Years active: 1918–1942
- Employer: Catholic University of Nijmegen

Herman de Vries de Heekelingen (18 June 1880 – 27 July 1942) was a Dutch scholar and author who lived the latter half of his life in Switzerland. He was professor of palaeography at the Catholic University of Nijmegen (with specialization in archaeology, prehistory, and ancient history) and was director of its library from 1923–1927.

De Vries authored of a number of books on the Jewish question, and has been described as an antisemitic ideologue.

== Life ==
De Vries was born in Groningen, Netherlands, and raised in a well-to-do Calvinist merchant family. In 1908, he converted to Roman Catholicism, and began his studies at the University of Fribourg, where he received his doctorate in 1917 with a thesis on Geneva as the birthplace of Dutch Calvinism. He acquired Swiss citizenship in 1921. In 1923, he was appointed to the newly established Katholieke Universiteit Nijmegen as associate professor of palaeography and diplomatics, and head of the University Library. His politics were anti-modernist and Integralist, and he was a member of the right-leaning Catholic Commission Catholique de Coopération Intellectuelle (English: Catholic Commission on Intellectual Cooperation).

In 1927, he had a falling out with the management of the University and took his leave. Resettling in Switzerland, he took de Heekelingen to his name. The same year, De Vries founded the Centre International d'Études sur le Fascisme (CINEF; English: International Centre for Studies on Fascism) in Lausanne, which was devoted to documentation, research, and international distribution of fascist ideology. Among prominent board members were Giovanni Gentile, James Strachey Barnes, Marcel Boulenger, and Lord Sydenham of Combe. On several occasions, De Vries had a personal audience with Benito Mussolini.

In 1932, he founded a Centre International de Documentation sur les Organisations Politiques (English: Documentation Centre of International Political Organizations) at Château de la Maison Blanche in Yvorne, Vaud, Switzerland. The same year he published a collection of quotations (from Ackerbau (agriculture) to Zucht (breed)) from the writings of leading National Socialist ideologues. The Centre reportedly received discrete contributions from Dorothy Downe (1876–1957).

In the 1930s, De Vries maintained diverse contacts with individuals and obscure associations of an "antisemitic International"; such as the "Pan-Aryan Union" founded by Georg de Pottere (1875–1951) and Edwin I. Cooper (1872–1942) in Vienna; the Princess Mary Karadja, who founded and led a "Christlich-arische Schutz-liga" (English: Christian-Aryan Protection League) in Locarno; and with Ulrich Fleischhauer's Erfurt-based Welt-Dienst (English: World-Service). He was a regular contributor to Ernest Jouin's antisemitic and anti-masonic Revue internationale des sociétés secrètes (English: International Review of Secret Societies). De Vries traveled in Switzerland, France, and Germany giving lectures on the "jüdischen Bedrohung" (Jewish threat).

In 1940, De Vries was called to testify for the defense during a trial in Switzerland. In the case, three young men were accused of distributing an anti-semitic tract by Philippe Lugrin which quoted anti-Christian passages from the Talmud. Prior to testifying, De Vries reportedly traveled to Rome to consult with Augustin Bea.

== Works ==
- Genève pépinière du calvinisme hollandais (Fribourg: Fragnière frères, 1918; Geneva: Slatkine Reprints, 1980, ISBN 2051001219)
- Les lois somptuaires de la République de Genève au XVIe siècle (Bern: Imprimerie K.-J. Wyss Erben, 1918)
- Correspondance de Bonaventura Vulcanius pendant son sejour à Cologne, Genève et Bâle (1573-1577) (The Hague: Martinus Nijhoff, 1923)
- Genève pépinière du calvinisme hollandais. Tome II. Correspondance des Élèves de Théodore de Bèze après leur départ de Genève (The Hague: Martinus Nijhoff, 1924; Geneva: Slatkine Reprints, 1980, ISBN 2051001219)
- Carmina Arminii: Quelques poésies de Jacques Arminius composées pendant son séjour en Suisse. Publiées ... et annotées par H. de Vries de Heekelingen (The Hague: Martinus Nijhoff, 1925)
- Un portrait inconnu de Théodore de Bèze: Avec la reproduction de 5 portraits (Alençon: Corbière & Jugain, 1925)
- Universiteitsbibliotheek en instituutsboekerijen: antwoord aan Prof. Dr. W. Mulder (Nijmegen: Katholieke Universiteit, 1927)
- Het fascisme en zijn resultaten (Oisterwijk: "Oisterwijk", 1927)
  - An Italian translation by S. Biraghi Lossetti was published as Il fascismo e i suoi risultati (Milan: Alpes, 1927)
  - Published in French as Fascisme et ses résultats (Brussels: Social Éditions, 1928)
- Die nationalsozialistische Weltanschauung: Ein Wegweiser durch die nationalsozialistische Literatur: 500 markante Zitate, zusammengestellt und herausgegeben von Univ. Prof. Dr. H. de Vries de Heekelingen (Berlin-Charlottenburg: Pan-Verlagsgesellschaft, 1932)
- Israél. Son passé. Son avenir (Paris: Perrin, 1937)
  - Published in Italian as Israele; il suo passato, il suo avvenire (Rome: Tumminelli, 1937)
  - A Polish translation by J.M. Czerniewskiej was published as Izrael, jego przeszłość i przyszłość with a foreword by Ludomiła Czerniewskiego (Poznań: Ksiegarnia Św. Wojciecha, 1938; Komorów: Wydawnictwo Antyk Marcin Dybowski, 2011)
  - Published in Spanish as Israel. Son passé. Son avenir (Buenos Aires: Editorial La Mazorca, 1939)
  - A Swedish translation by Olof Örström was published as Israel: Historia och leverne genom tiderna (Stockholm: Svea rike, 1940)
  - A Dutch translation by J. van Starkenburg was published as De Joden in de Christelijke samenleving (Oisterwijk: Uitgeverij "Oisterwijk", 1938)
- De Joodsche hoogmoed (Amsterdam: Amsterdamsche Keurkamer, 1937)
- L'orgueil juif (Paris: Revue internationale des sociétés secrètes, 1938)
  - Published in Spanish as El orgullo judío (Buenos Aires: Editorial La Mazorca, 1944)
- Les Protocoles des sages de Sion constituent-ils un faux? (Lausanne: Typ. A. Rochat-Pache, 1938)
- Juifs et catholiques (Paris: B. Grasset, 1939)
- Le Talmud et le non-juif: une expertise preparée pour le Tribunal d'Oron siégeant à Lausanne les 15, 16 et 17 janvier 1940; contenant une critique de l'expertise de Emile Golay et quelques commentaires sur l'expertise de Max Haller (Neuchâtel: V. Attinger, 1940; printed in Rome)
- L'Antisémitisme italien (Florence: F. Le Monnier, 1940)
  - Published in English as The Jewish Question in Italy (London: Final Conflict, 2002, ISBN 0954206207)
- Le peuple juif. Édition définitive de "Israël, son passé, son avenir" (Brussels: Éditions de la Phalange, 1942)
- Het Joodsche volk, with a foreword by René Lambrichts (Brussels: Uitg. "De Phalanx", 1942)
