= Hans Dirk de Vries Reilingh =

Dutch geographer (1908–2001)

Hans Dirk de Vries Reilingh (Groningen, 22 August 1908 - Naarden, 18 April 2001) was a Dutch geographer and professor.

== Personal life ==
Hans Dirk de Vries Reilingh, often shortened to Reilingh, was born into a family of doctors in Groningen. His father and his grandfather were both postgraduate doctors. After the death of his father, Reilingh moved to The Hague. This was where he completed his HSB-b final exams. He then enrolled in social geography studies at the University of Amsterdam. In 1932 he earned his master's degree. His friend, Hendrick van der Wielen (in 1930 promoted by Sebald Rudolf Steinmetz) asked him to teach c courses at Allardsoog, the first Volkshogeschool in the Netherlands.

In 1938, Reilingh moved to Markelo, where he founded the volkhogeschool Diependaal. During the Second World War, his work at the volkshogeschool was shut down. Reilingh worked in the war years as a teacher in Almelo and also as a researcher for ISONEVO in Twente. He also finished his thesis during this period. He was awarded cum laude by Steinmetz on 11 November 1945.

After the Second World War, Reilingh worked for the Ministry of Education, Arts and Sciences. In 1947, he founded the volkshogeschool Eerbeek.

In 1949 Henri Nicolaas ter Veen died. Reilingh was his successor of the same department: Social Geography and Land Description. He retired in 1971.

== The Volkshogeschool ==
In the preface of his thesis 'De Volkshoogeschool', Reailinh writes that his study came about at the insistence of his professor Steinmetz. Steinmetz has much sympathy for the ideas that underlie the work at the Volkshogeschool.

After a short introduction where the goals and methods of the Volkshogeschool as an instrument for community development is outlined, followed by seven chapters about the development of Volkshogeschools in Scandinavia, Germany, Switzerland and the Netherlands. The development in Denmark receives the most attention because this country was the home of volkhogeschool work of Nikolaj Frederik Severin Grundtvig and Christen Mikkelsen Kold. In the second part of his thesis, the various goals, systems and methods of volkhogeschool work are compared with each other.

== Sociography and Social Geography ==
The Reilingh's views regarding sociology and social geography differed from those of his predecessor Ter Veen. Ten Veen had always developed more to a form of applied Sociology, but Reilingh emphatically studied social phenomenon in the spatial context. In his eyes geographical sociology must remain. See Also Sociale geografie UvA 1950- 1970.

Not only did Reilingh have to examine the strong emerging field of sociology but he also had to determine also his own position in the field. In his eyes, social geography was like that in Utrecht and Groningen, where it was concentrated on the field's economic aspects. Large attention was given to the pursuit of human prosperity by the Groningse social geographer Hendrik Jacob Keuning leading Reiling to geographical materialism, causing him to believe that the mental and cultural factors were underexposed.

Because of the cultural and political aspects of the study of the relation between the people and the surrounding space received more attention, the meaning of the physical environment received less. For Reilingh the social space, also known as territorial cohabitation, was central. Reilingh explained various emphases in Social Geography and because of that could develop his use of the political and cultural forms of geography at the University of Amsterdam.

== The Inner City of Amsterdam ==
Until he was appointed as a professor in 1949, Reilingh was highly focussed on the analysis of rural issues. He published, among other things in 1949 a twosome of country monographs for Weerselo and Markelo. In the fifties he continued to regularly publish works about issues of rural character as he researched the regional cultural situation in the province of North-Holland.

However, his scientific staff urged him to do more research in urban areas, more relevant to the particular problems of districts, neighbourhoods and inner cities. The postwar housing shortage was for Reilingh and his staff (de Sociografische Werkgemeenschap (Sociographic Work Community)) a stimulus to investigate problems in neighborhoods. One started with field studies of the living conditions in a number of neighbourhoods in the district Bos en Lommer.

In the beginning of the sixties the municipality of Amsterdam struggled with the problems of decay and loss of function in the inner city. There was an alderman Joop den Uyl appointed by a municipal commission who invited Reilingh to participate. That was the beginning of an extensive research project under the leadership of Reilingh, Willem Heinemeyer and Michel van Hulten. The research reported on, among other things, land prices, image, accessibility and monuments in ‘Het Centrum van Amsterdam, een sociografische studie (The Center of Amsterdam, a sociographic study)’ (1968). During this research many national and international contributors were contacted. During 1966, the involved experts brought together a study week 'Urban Core and Inner City'. The discussions there contributed heavily to the meaning of development in Amsterdam.

== Terrareeks (Terra Series) ==
Reilingh was also active in the publication of geographical books for a wide public. He catered three parts of the Terra Series, that were started by his predecessor, Ter Veen. He wrote the sections on Denmark, Belgium (together with M. Van Haegendoren) and Austria (together with J. Wartha).

== Editorial Activities ==
Reilingh even edited the magazine Het Gemenebest (The Commonwealth) and he was a co-founder of the Belgian-Dutch magazine Volksopvoeding (People's Education). During the fifties he was a member of the editorial office of Folia Civitatis. He was also a member and later chairman of the magazine Aardrijkskundig Genootschap (Geographical Society). He was also vice president of the editorial office of the Geografisch Tijdschrift (Geographic Magazine).

== Publications ==
- De Volkshoogeschool, Een sociografische studie van haar ontwikkelingsgang in verschillende landen en haar mogelijke beteekenis voor de Nederlandsche volksgemeenschap, J.B. Wolters, Groningen-Batavia, 1945
- Denemarken, Oase in Europa, Terra-reeks, nr. 4, Boom, Meppel, 1948
- Weerseloo, Sociografieën van Plattelandsgemeenten, ’s Gravenhage, 1949
- Markelo, Sociografieën van Plattelandsgemeenten, ’s Gravenhage, 1949
- De volksopvoeding als vormende kracht in het sociale leven, Oratie Universiteit van Amsterdam, Groningen, 1950
- België. Lotgenoot in de Lage Landen, Terra-reeks, nr. 12, Boom, Meppel, 1953 (met M. Van Haegendoren)
- Sociale aspecten der vrijetijdsbesteding, in: Volksopvoeding, 1954, pp. 2-17
- Onderzoek naar de regionale culturele situatie in de provincie Noordholland, Mededeling Prins Bernard Fonds, nr. 13, 1956
- Oostenrijk, Het gekortwiekte adelaarsjong, Terra-reeks, nr. 19, Boom, Meppel, 1957 (met F. Wartha)
- Kommt die deutsche Geopolitik wieder hoch? Tijdschrift Aardrijkskundig Genootschap, 1957, pp. 485-489
- Het regionale element in het sociaal onderzoek, in: Sociaal-Wetenschappelijke Verkenningen, Assen, 1957, pp. 158-176
- Stad en staat Rio de Janeiro als ontwikkelingsgebied, Tijdschrift Aardrijkskundig Genootschap, 1957, pp. 137-159
- De sociale aardrijkskunde als geesteswetenschap, in: Tijdschrift Aardrijkskundig Genootschap, 1961, pp. 112-122
- The tension between form and function in the inner city of Amsterdam, Proceedings Urban Core and Inner City, 1967, pp. 309-323
- Het monumentkarakter van onze binnenstad, in: W.F. Heinemeyer, M. Van Hulten en H.D. de Vries Reilingh, Het Centrum van Amsterdam, een sociografische studie’, Amsterdam, 1968, pp. 171–208
- Na een herleving der politieke geografie, Geografisch Tijdschrift, Deel III, nr. 2, 1969, pp. 104–110

== Sources ==
- Cees Cortie, Amsterdam als boeiend laboratorium, het begin van de stadsgeografie in Amsterdam, in: Hans Knippenberg en Marijke van Schendelen (redactie), Alles heeft zijn plaats. 125 jaar Geografie en Planologie aan de Universiteit van Amsterdam, 1877-2002, Aksant, Amsterdam, 2002, pp 23–39
- A.G.J. Dietvorst (e.a.), Algemene sociale geografie. Ontwikkelingslijnen en standpunten, Romen, Weesp, 1984
- W.F. Heinemeyer, Reilingh en de sociale geografie, in: Geografisch Tijdschrift, Nieuwe Reeks, Deel V, nr. 4, September 1971, pp 291–303
- B. de Pater, Reilingh: de laatste Steinmetziaan, in: Geografie, Jrg. 10, nr. 1, januari 2001, pp. 41–42
- W.H. Vermooten, Sociografie en sociale geografie in Nederland ná Steinmetz, Afscheidscollege Amsterdam, 10 oktober 1968, Assen 1968
