= David Devriès =

French opera singer

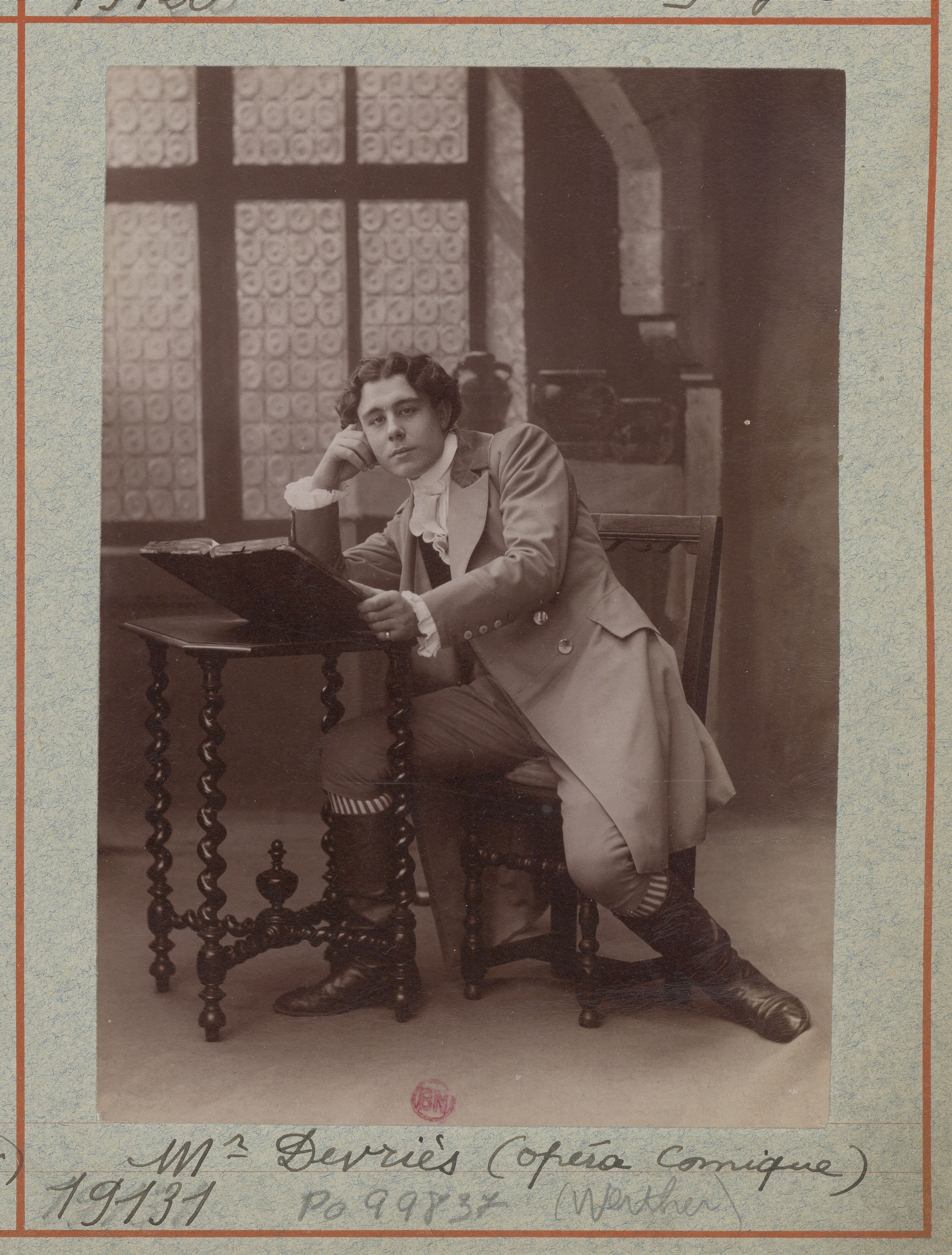
Devriès as Werther

David Devriès (14 February 1882 in Bagnères-de-Luchon, France – 17 July 1936 in Neuilly-sur-Seine, France) was a French operatic lyric tenor noted for his light, heady tone, and polished phrasing. He represents a light style of French operatic singing that was popular in the 19th and 20th centuries.

He was born into a family of professional singers that included his grandmother soprano Rosa de Vries-van Os (1828–1889), his aunts Fidès Devriès and Jeanne Devriès-Dereims, his uncles baritones Hermann Devriès (1854–1949) and Maurice Devriès (1856–1914), and his father Marcel-Louis Devriès (1849-1923), a chorister with the Paris Opera. David Devrès was also the half-brother of composer and conductor Henri Büsser (1872-1973). He studied at the Conservatoire de Paris and débuted in the role of Gérald in Delibes's Lakmé at the Opéra-Comique, where he regularly performed throughout his career. His repertoire included Almaviva, Don José, Toinet in Le chemineau, Clément in La Basoche, Armand in Massenet's Thérèse, Alfredo, Jean in Sapho, Rabaud's Mârouf, Vincent in Mireille, Wilhelm in Mignon, Pedro in Laparra's La habanera, Des Grieux, Werther, Julien, Pinkerton and Cavaradossi as well as principal roles in many forgotten works. He created roles in the operas Aphrodite (Philodème), Les Armaillis (Hansli), Circé (Helpénor), Le roi aveugle (Ymer) and La Victoire (un Brigadier), at the Opéra-Comique.

He performed alongside Mary Garden, Luisa Tetrazzini and Dame Nellie Melba. He also gave the world premiere of Boulanger's song cycle 'Clairières dans le Ciel', which Boulanger claimed was inspired by his voice.

In 1909-10 Devriès took part in the final season of Oscar Hammerstein I's Manhattan Opera Company, singing a range of French opera, including Pelléas et Mélisande, which he also performed in 1910 at Covent Garden. He created the role of Paco in Manuel de Falla's La vie breve. He was also a very active singer in oratorio, in works ranging from J. S. Bach's St Matthew Passion to Berlioz' The Damnation of Faust.

At the Paris Concerts du Conservatoire Devriès sang in the B Minor Mass of J. S. Bach (1908, 1926 and 1931), the St John Passion of J. S. Bach (1914), in Beethoven's Choral Symphony (1926, and at the Beethoven centenary concert in 1927) and the 2nd part of L'enfance du Christ by Berlioz (1931).

His son Ivan (born Daniel) Devriès (1909–97), great grandson of Théophile Gautier and Ernesta Grisi, was a composer and musician.
