= Constance Kamii =

American academic

Constance Kamii was a Swiss-Japanese-American mathematics education scholar and psychologist. She was a professor in the Early Childhood Education Program Department of Curriculum and Instruction at the University of Alabama in Birmingham, Alabama.

== Overview ==
Constance Kamii was born in Geneva, Switzerland, and attended elementary schools there and in Japan. She finished high school in Los Angeles, attended Pomona College, receiving a B.A. in sociology in 1955. She continued her studies the University of Michigan and received an M.A. in education in 1957 and a Ph.D. in education and psychology in 1965. In 1966-67 she was a Postdoctoral Research Fellow under Jean Piaget, Bärbel Inhelder, and Hermina Sinclair at the University of Geneva.

She was a professor of early childhood education at the University of Alabama in Birmingham. A major concern of hers since her work on the Perry Preschool Project in the 1960s was the conceptualization of goals and objectives for early childhood education on the basis of a scientific theory explaining children’s sociological and intellectual development. Convinced that the only theory in existence that explains this development from the first day of life to adolescence was that of Jean Piaget, she studied under him on and off for 15 years.

When she was not studying under Piaget in Geneva, she worked closely with teachers in the United States to develop practical ways of using his theory in classrooms. The outcome of this classroom research can be seen in Physical Knowledge in Preschool Education and Group Games in Early Education, which she wrote with Rheta DeVries. Since 1980, she had been extending this curriculum research to the primary grades and wrote Young Children Reinvent Arithmetic (about first grade), Young Children Continue to Reinvent Arithmetic, 2nd Grade, and Young Children Continue to Reinvent Arithmetic, 3rd Grade. In all these books, she emphasized the long-range, over-all aim of education envisioned by Piaget, which is children’s development of sociological and intellectual autonomy.

Kamii studied under Jean Piaget to develop an early childhood curriculum based on his theory. This work can be seen in Physical Knowledge in Preschool Education (1978) and Group Games in Early Education (1980) (which she wrote with Rheta DeVries), and Number in Preschool and Kindergarten (1982). From 1980 to 2000, she developed a primary arithmetic program based on Piaget's theory. She abandoned this effort in 2000 because many parents of fourth graders were teaching "carrying" and "borrowing" at home.
