= Piet van Wyk de Vries =

South African musician (1972–2023)

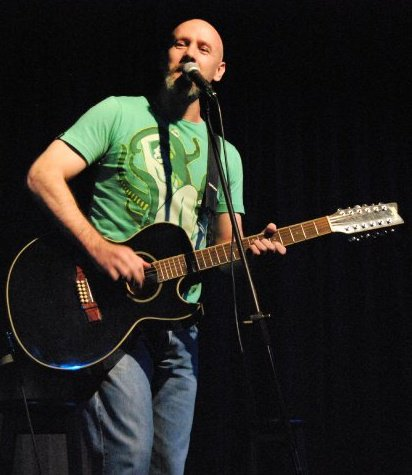

Background information
- Born: May 7, 1972; Pretoria, South Africa
- Died: May 11, 2023 (aged 51)
- Genres: Alternative Afrikaans
- Occupations: Songwriter, musician
- Labels: Independent, Scorpio Music, Sting Music, EMI Music Publishing
- Website: www.vanwykdevries.comwww.cerakote.co.za

Piet van Wyk de Vries (7 May 1972 - 11 May 2023) was an independent South African songwriter born in Pretoria in 1972.

== Background ==
Piet van Wyk de Vries was born in Pretoria, South Africa. He grew up in Johannesburg and Pretoria. He attended School in Meyerspark and Silverton( at Hoërskool Silverton). He did his national service in the South African Police as a member of Eenheid 19 (Unit 19), from 1991 to 1994. He has done some freelance work in the security sector after that. He was also Director of Security at Wierda Glen Estate during 2010/11. While his main occupation has been as a songwriter for other artists, he has from time to time recorded some of his own material. He is also a Security Industry Specialist, and a Qualified Gunsmith. He used to specialize in Ceramic Coatings on firearms.

Piet van Wyk de Vries died on 11 May 2023.

== Early career ==
He started in the music industry by fronting the bands "Backyard Blues Band", "Superfly" and "Flying Circus", but soon changed directions by focusing more on music production and studio design. This culminated in 2000 when he designed and built what was at the time the largest digital studio in Africa for Sting Music in Johannesburg. This studio was the model for many subsequent digital studios in Southern Africa, including those of the South African Broadcast Corporation, and many production houses. He used this Pro Tools based studio to produce the first Afrikaans album by the artist Dozi (Hendrik Opperman), entitled "Op Aanvraag", which has since become one of the most successful albums of that genre of all time. This album also launched the career of songwriter Stef Kruger.

Before the Dozi album he arranged, wrote and produced music and live items for many South African artists in the English and Black markets, including PJ Powers, Lebo Mathosa and Billy Forrest. He also co-engineered a private recording for Eddy Grant, who recorded a birthday song in South Africa for his wife.

The band "Flying Circus" recorded two albums. The first was entitled "Favorite Jinx" and contained the radio hits "Just Like James Dean" and "Stay". The latter's music video going on to win awards for the production house, Rapid Blue.

== Afrikaans writer ==
After that van Wyk de Vries switched his focus to the Afrikaans market, where he has produced mostly compilation albums, examples being some of the "Sokkietreffer" and "Bokjol" franchise compilations. He is much better known as a songwriter, and has written for a number of Afrikaans singers. Most notable of these are Dozi, Wynand Strydom and Mathys Roets, the last of which uses his songs almost exclusively.

In 2006, van Wyk de Vries returned to original production when he co-produced the album "Kom 'n Bietjie Binne" for Dozi, following the artist's move to Sony/BMG. This also contained the hit song "Susanna Soen My", which he wrote, produced and sang on.

== Solo work ==
In 2007 he more or less retired from production work, and released a solo album, entitled "Die son die maan die sterre" (The sun the moon the stars), containing 11 original works, including the radio hits "MadeleinMadelein", "Iemand soos jy" and "Leë Skoene".

In September 2008 he released his second solo album, called "'n Pyl deur seil met vuur" (An arrow through sail with fire), and surprised attendants at a concert with a collaboration on stage with singer/songwriter Andre G. Nel. He has also in 2009/10 collaborated with the Coleske brothers on songs for the singer Guillome and others. In 2011 the artist Ricus Nel recorded the song "MadeleinMadelein" for his own solo album.

In 2010, he released a limited run CD entitled "Vensterkat maak 'n Wens" (Window-Cat makes a wish), at a show in the Pierneef Theatre. This was mostly attended by close friends and family, and by invitation only. The album contained many deeply personal songs, as well as some experimental and semi-instrumental compositions.

In 2012 He released his 4th solo album, entitled "Die Geheime Wereld van Piet van Wyk de Vries" at a sold-out concert at Atterbury Theater in Pretoria. This album contained remixed and remastered versions of his favorite tracks from the previous albums, as well as a few new compositions.

During 2011 he focused on composing new material for a release by the singer Mathys Roets, entitled "Rembrandt se Meisie in die Maan."

In 2012, van Wyk de Vries signed a deal with South African company Storm Records to produce and distribute an album encompassing the best works from the previous 3 studio albums. This album, entitled "Die geheime wêreld van Piet van Wyk de Vries" (The secret world of Piet van Wyk de Vries)was launched to much critical acclaim in May 2012 at the Atterbury Theatre in Pretoria.

== EMI Music Publishing (South Africa) ==
EMI music Pub (SA) has handled van Wyk de Vries' music publishing, and administered his "Triplane Music" publishing label, since 1997. In 1997, van Wyk de Vries was offered one of the largest non-recoupable advances ever for a South African songwriter, as an incentive for signing with EMI Publishing. During the following years, EMI has in one way or another handled all publishing for all songs that van Wyk de Vries wrote, with the (one known) exception of a song called "This Life", which was penned by van Wyk de Vries and sung by the superstar PJ Powers, and was published by Sting Music. In 2011, after EMI Publishing had been bought by Sony/BMG, the company renewed its contracts with van Wyk de Vries for at least another five years.

== Exhibitions ==
In 2008, the South African painter Bess Rheeders discovered van Wyk de Vries, and painted a series of paintings inspired by the songs on his first album. These were only displayed to the public once, and have all been sold into private collections since, apart from one painting, which she gave to the artist. In 2014, the Centurion Arts Association also presented an exhibition of works inspired by the lyrics of Piet van Wyk de Vries, as sung by Mathys Roets.
