= Diane L. Peters =

American mechanical engineer

Diane L. Peters is an American mechanical engineer whose research interests include the control and simulation of autonomous vehicles, and engineering education. She is a professor of mechanical engineering at Kettering University in Flint, Michigan.

== Education and career ==
Peters graduated from the University of Notre Dame in 1993, with a bachelor's degree in mechanical engineering. Following this, she worked in industry in the printing and automated assembly industries. While continuing to work in industry, she received a master's degree in 2000 from the University of Illinois Chicago, and began teaching part-time at Oakton College in Illinois.

Returning to graduate study, Peters completed a Ph.D. in mechanical engineering at the University of Michigan in 2010. Her dissertation, Coupling and controllability in optimal design and control, was jointly supervised by Panos Papalambros and Galip Ulsoy. She remained at the University of Michigan for another year as a postdoctoral researcher, and became a part-time instructor at Eastern Michigan University.

After two more years of industry work, she became an assistant professor of mechanical engineering at Kettering University in 2013. She was promoted to full professor in 2025. At Kettering University, she is the faculty advisor for a team of students in autonomous vehicle competitions.

== Recognition ==
Peters received the Distinguished New Engineer award of the Society of Women Engineers (SWE) in 2002. She was one of four 2019 recipients of the SAE International Educational Award Honoring Ralph R. Teetor, and one of five 2022 recipients of SAE International's J. Cordell Breed Award for Women Leaders. The SWE named her as a Distinguished Engineering Educator in 2024. She was the 2024 recipient of the National Outstanding Teaching Award of the American Society for Engineering Education.

She was elected as an ASME Fellow in 2025.
