= Volksverwering =

Belgian far-right anti-Jewish organisation (1937–1944)

- Volksverwering; La Défense du Peuple
- Named after: People’s Defence (literal translation)
- Formation: 1937
- Founder: René Lambrichts
- Dissolved: 1944
- Type: Far-right, antisemitic organisation
- Purpose: Anti-Jewish propaganda and agitation
- Headquarters: Antwerp, Belgium
- Region served: Belgium

Volksverwering (sometimes spelled Volkswering; La Défense du Peuple) was a Flemish, mainly Antwerp-based, far-right and openly antisemitic organisation active in Belgium from 1937 until 1944. Founded and led by Antwerp lawyer René Lambrichts, it espoused Nazi-style biological racism and focused on the removal of Jews from Belgian society through agitation and propaganda.

== History ==
=== Origins and ideology ===
Volksverwering emerged in Antwerp in early 1937 under the initiative of lawyer René Lambrichts, who had previously been active in nationalist circles. It promoted radical antisemitism grounded in “blood and soil” racism and aligned itself with National Socialism.

From January 1937 the group issued a homonymous newspaper, Volksverwering: propagandablad ter beveiliging van ras en bodem (“propaganda paper for the protection of race and soil”), modeled in tone on Der Stürmer. In 1941 it continued as Volksche Aanval; a francophone counterpart appeared as L’Ami du Peuple.

=== Activities under German occupation ===
After the German invasion in May 1940, Volksverwering intensified anti-Jewish agitation and cooperated with occupation structures. Around March 1941, in conjunction with the Sipo–SD, the movement helped set up the “Landelijke Anti-Joodsche Centrale voor Vlaanderen en Wallonië” (Central Anti-Jewish Office), led by SD agent Pierre Beeckmans.

The organisation played a visible role in Antwerp. On 14 April 1941 (Easter Monday) it organised a screening of the Nazi propaganda film Der Ewige Jude at Cinema Rex on the De Keyserlei. After the screening, several hundred people—many linked to Volksverwering, VNV and SS-Vlaanderen—attacked Jewish homes, shops and synagogues in what contemporary historians describe as a “mini-pogrom” or the “Antwerp Kristallnacht”.

Volksverwering’s propaganda also included posters, labels and stamps caricaturing Jews; surviving examples are preserved in museum and archive collections. Membership figures are uncertain; educational material from Kazerne Dossin estimates “about 700 members”.

=== Dissolution and prosecutions ===
The movement ceased to function with the Liberation in 1944. Post-war prosecutions followed: Lambrichts was arrested in 1945 and received a life sentence from Belgian courts; contemporary scholarly summaries note his conviction and later appeals.

== Publications ==
- Volksverwering: propagandablad ter beveiliging van ras en bodem (Antwerp, 1937–1941).
- Volksche Aanval (successor title; organ of Volksverwering).
- L’Ami du Peuple (francophone).

== Visuals ==
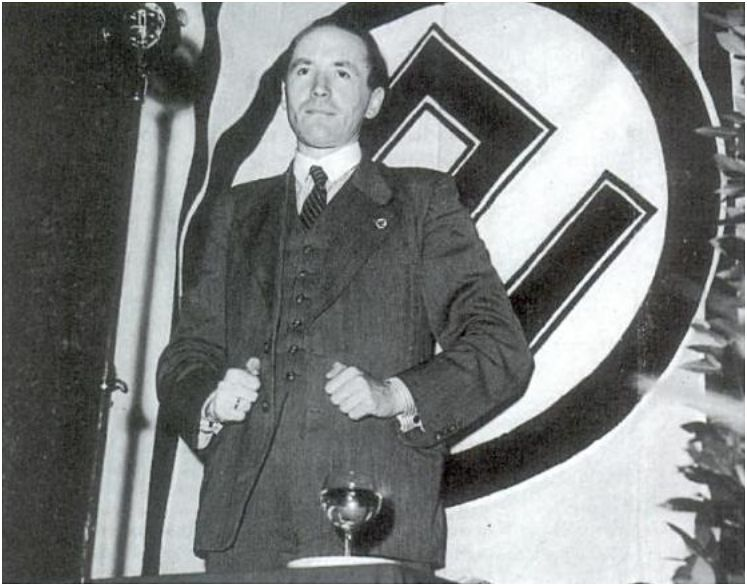
René Lambrichts standing before a Volksverwering flag, Brussels, 17 July 1942.

== See also ==
- Vlaams Nationaal Verbond
- Rexist Party
- Antwerp; Cinema Rex bombing (for the venue’s later history)
