= Jeroen de Vries =

Dutch marathon speed skater (born 1971)

Personal information
- Nationality: Dutch
- Born: 16 July 1971 (age 53); Sint Nicolaasga, Friesland, Netherlands

Sport
- Country: Netherlands
- Sport: Speed skating

Jeroen de Vries (born 16 July 1971, Sint Nicolaasga?) is a Dutch marathon speed skater.

As of 2006, De Vries has won eight marathons on artificial speed skating tracks, including one during the 2006 Six Days of the Greenery. In 2005, he won the Alternative Elfstedentocht at the Weissensee in 5:13.57 hours.
