= René Lambrichts =

Belgian lawyer and far-right activist (1900–1993)

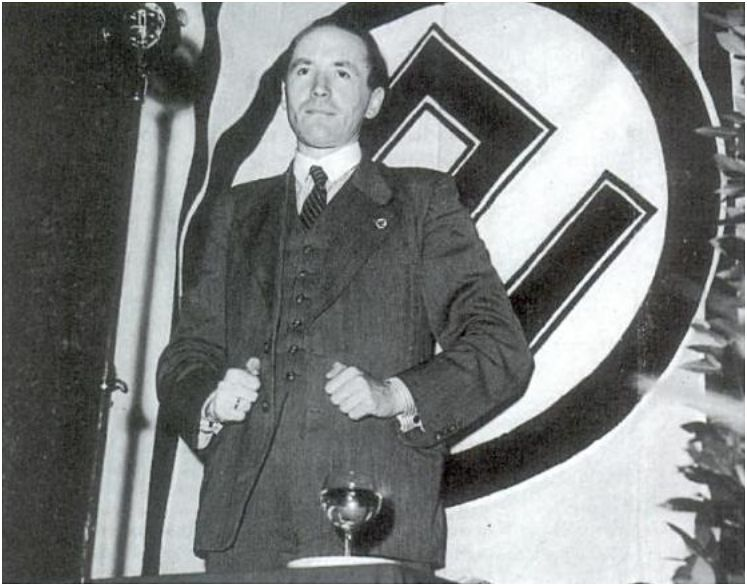
- Lambrichts before a Volksverwering flag (Brussels, 17 July 1942)
- Born: René Lambrichts; 1 April 1900; Borgerhout, Antwerp, Belgium
- Died: 24 November 1993 (aged 93); Uccle, Brussels-Capital Region, Belgium
- Occupations: Lawyer; political activist
- Known for: Founder and leader of Volksverwering

René Lambrichts (1 April 1900 – 24 November 1993) was a Belgian lawyer and far-right activist who founded and led Volksverwering (French: La Défense du Peuple), a minor antisemitic political party established in Antwerp in 1937. Under German occupation during the Second World War, Volksverwering resumed propaganda activity with the occupier’s approval, organised anti-Jewish meetings and film screenings, and welcomed anti-Jewish ordinances; activists from the group were among the instigators of the Antwerp pogrom of April 1941.

== Life ==
Lambrichts was born in Borgerhout. He studied at Antwerp secondary schools and briefly enrolled at the Catholic University of Leuven in 1919 before enlisting in the French Foreign Legion the same year; after contracting typhus he returned to Belgium in 1924 with serious hearing loss. Around 1928 he took up law studies, completed his traineeship (1933–1935) and joined the Flemish Bar Conference in Antwerp. He moved in Belgian-nationalist circles (Jonge Belgen/Jeunes Belges; the youth of the National Legion) and edited the corporatist union paper De Stormloop (1933–1936).

== Volksverwering ==
Lambrichts founded Volksverwering – La Défense du Peuple in January 1937, publishing a namesake paper subtitled Propagandablad ter Beveiliging van Bloed en Bodem. Centred on Antwerp, the group combined virulent biological racism with National-Socialist sympathies; it developed branches in Brussels, Liège and Ghent and drew support from Flemish extremists such as Antoon Lint and Gustaaf Vanniesbecq. By 1938 it had assumed an overtly pro-Nazi profile, created a paramilitary “Action Group”, and received modest German financial backing; admission required an explicit declaration of unconditional support for Adolf Hitler. Municipal and academic syntheses likewise identify Volksverwering as a driving force in interwar Antwerp antisemitism and wartime agitation.

== War and occupation ==
At the German invasion in May 1940, Belgian authorities interned a range of “suspects,” including radical Flemish nationalists. On 13 May, detainees such as August Borms, René Lagrou and René Lambrichts were evacuated from Antwerp’s Begijnenstraat prison towards France. Returning to Belgium after the Armistice, Lambrichts resumed activity. From October 1940 the occupier allowed Volksverwering to restart propaganda: the paper reappeared, anti-Jewish exhibitions and meetings were organised (including one on 15 December 1940), and in March 1941 the paper was retitled Volksche Aanval (“People’s Attack”).

On 14 April 1941, following public screenings of the Nazi propaganda film Der Ewige Jude in Antwerp, anti-Jewish violence broke out in the city; contemporary and later accounts describe Volksverwering activists among the instigators and note Lambrichts’s leading role around the events. In 1942 Volksverwering concluded cooperation agreements with like-minded organisations and urged denunciation of Jews as deportations escalated; in February 1943 the occupier banned Lambrichts from further publishing Volksche Aanval (and its francophone counterpart L’Ami du Peuple), after which his activity centred on exhibitions and contributions to collaborationist outlets such as Volk en Staat.

== Later life and death ==
Post-war syntheses on antisemitic organisations and collaboration in Belgium discuss Volksverwering and its leadership in the wider context of the persecution of Jews; the Senate-commissioned study La Belgique docile remains a central reference. Lambrichts died in Uccle, Brussels, on 24 November 1993.

== Selected publications ==
- Het jodendom een gevaar voor onze zelfstandigheid? (1940).
- “Voorwoord” to H. de Vries de Heekelingen, Het joodsche volk (Dutch and French eds., 1942).
