= Jan de Vries (historian) =

Dutch economic historian

Jan de Vries (born November 14, 1943) is a Dutch economic historian. He is Professor emeritus at the University of California, Berkeley. He is best known for his work on the Industrial Revolution and European urbanization, as well as the economic history of the Netherlands. He was elected to the American Philosophical Society in 2002.
