= Henri Nicolaas ter Veen =

Dutch professor and geographer (1883 - 1949)

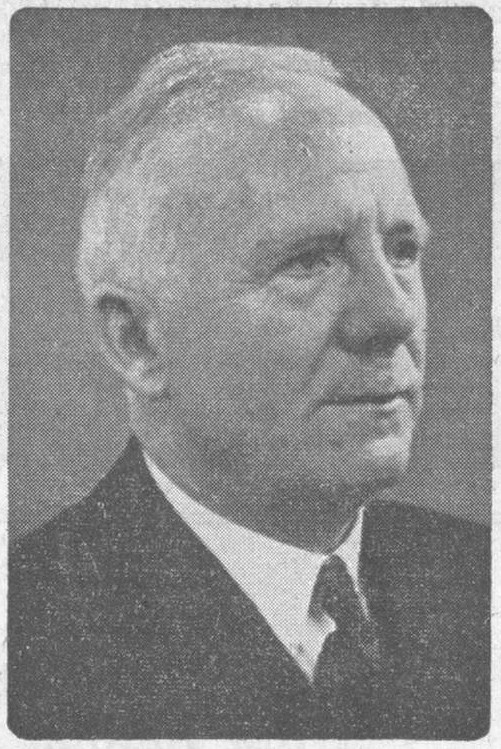
- Born: 19 February 1883; Amsterdam, Netherlands
- Died: 7 November 1949 (aged 66); Amsterdam, Netherlands
- Education: University of Amsterdam
- Occupation: Sociographer

Henri Nicolaas ter Veen (19 February 1883 – 7 November 1949) was a Dutch social geographer. He was born in Amsterdam in a simple working class family from the Jordaan. In 1901 he became a teacher at a primary school in Amsterdam. While studying geography het met Sebald Rudolf Steinmetz (nl), the founder of the Dutch school of sociography. In 1925, he earned his doctorate under Steinmetz with a dissertation about the colonisation of the Haarlemmermeer, a polder in the Netherlands, consisting of land reclaimed from water.

In 1933 he succeeded Steinmets as professor of sociography at the University of Amsterdam. Unlike his mentor Steinmetz, Ter Veen attached great importance to applied research as a means of contributing to the resolution of social problems. In the 1930s he traveled to Libya, Italy, Poland, Finland, and the Soviet Union. He was an early critic of the academic German school of geopolitics of Karl Haushofer, that influenced the ideological development of Adolf Hitler.

Illness forced him to relinquish his post prematurely in 1948, and he died in 1949. He played an important role in popularising social geography in the Netherlands. From its founding in 1925, he served as editorial secretary of the academic journal Mensch en Maatschappij (People and Society). In 1940 he founded the Instituut voor Sociaal Onderzoek van het Nederlandse Volk ((ISONEVO), Social Research Institute of the Netherlands) the first applied social research facilities in the Netherlands.
