= Barend de Vries =

Dutch economist

Barend de Vries (1925–2010) was Chief Economist at the World Bank.

Barend was born in Utrecht, the Netherlands and was brought up as a member of the Dutch Reformed Church. In 1943, whilst a student at the University of Utrecht he was arrested and sent to a concentration camp, as the occupying Nazis wished to make an example of some students following the killing of a Dutch Nazi general. However after the war he was able to finish his degree and proceed to post graduate education at the University of Chicago finally gaining a PhD at Massachusetts Institute of Technology. He also participated in the Cowles Commission whilst at Chicago.

He was married to Margaret Garritsen de Vries.
