= Keith DeVries =

American archaeologist (1937–2006)

Keith Robert DeVries (January 2, 1937 – July 16, 2006) was a prominent archaeologist and expert on the Phrygian city of Gordium, in what is now Turkey. He was born in Grand Rapids, Michigan.

DeVries earned his undergraduate degree at the University of Michigan and his doctorate at the University of Pennsylvania. From 1970 to 2004, he taught the latter university. He also worked for its Museum of Archaeology and Anthropology in the Mediterranean section.

As an excavator, DeVries worked at Ischia and the excavations at Ancient Corinth. His primary work was at Gordium; there he directed the excavations from 1977 to 1987.

In his last years, he was involved with a reassessment of the chronology of the Iron Age in Gordium and other parts of Anatolia. DeVries died of cancer in Philadelphia, Pennsylvania in 2006.

== Works (incomplete) ==
- (Editor) From Athens to Gordion: the papers of a memorial symposium for Rodney S. Young, held at the University Museum, the third of May, 1975 (Philadelphia: University Museum, University of Pennsylvania, 1980).
