= Vries (surname) =

Vries is a surname. Notable people with the surname include:

- Gino Vries (born 1987), South African cricketer
- Maarten Gerritsz Vries (1589–late 1647), Dutch cartographer and explorer
- Ricky Vries, Namibian politician
- Sherwin Vries (born 1980), South African sprinter
- Virgil Vries (born 1989), Namibian football player
- Clara de Vries (1915–1942), Dutch jazz trumpeter
- Jonna de Vries (born 1990), Dutch rower

== See also ==
- De Vries
