= Carl E. DeVries =

American Egyptologist, Baptist minister, football coach (1921–2010)

Biographical details
- Born: April 17, 1921
- Died: September 3, 2010 (aged 89); Chicago, Illinois, U.S.

Playing career

Football
- 1939–1942: Wheaton (IL)

Track and field
- c. 1939–1943: Wheaton (IL)

Coaching career (HC unless noted)

Football
- 1943–1945: Wheaton (IL)

Track and field
- 1943–1946: Wheaton (IL)

Head coaching record
- Overall: 11–5–3

Carl E. DeVries (April 17, 1921 – September 3, 2010) was an American Egyptologist, Baptist minister, and college football coach. He served as the head football coach at Wheaton College in Wheaton, Illinois for three seasons, from 1943 to 1945, compiling a record of 11–5–3.

A native of Jeffers, Minnesota, DeVries attended Wheaton College, where he played football and competed in track and field for four years. DeVries did not serve during World War II because he had lost an eye during his teenage years. At Wheaton, DeVries was a classmate of Billy Graham. He earned a Bachelor of Science in 1942, a Master of Arts in 1944, and a Bachelor of Divinity degree in 1947 from Wheaton. He received a Doctor of Philosophy in Egyptology from the University of Chicago in 1960. DeVries taught Biblical archaeology at Wheaton from 1945 to 1952, and remained a member of the college's coaching staff until 1952. He subsequently taught at Trinity Evangelical Divinity School in Deerfield, Illinois, and was a member the faculty at the Oriental Institute—now known as the Institute for the Study of Ancient Cultures—at the University of Chicago. DeVries died on September 3, 2010, in Chicago.

== Head coaching record ==
Year	Team	Overall	Conference	Standing	Bowl/playoffs
Wheaton Crusaders (Independent) (1943–1945)
1943	Wheaton	3–0–3			
1944	Wheaton	5–1			
1945	Wheaton	3–4			
Wheaton:		11–5–3			
Total:		11–5–3			
