= De Vriese =

- Pronunciation: Dutch: [də ˈvrisə]
- Language: Flemish

Origin
- Meaning: The Frisian
- Region of origin: Belgium

Other names
- Variant forms: Devriese, de Vreese, de Vrieze

De Vriese is a Flemish surname. It is one of several Belgian equivalents of the much more numerous Dutch family name De Vries.

Notable people with this family name include:

- Bertha De Vriese (1877–1958), Belgian physician
- Emmerik De Vriese (born 1985), Belgian footballer
- Willem Hendrik de Vriese (1806–1862), Dutch botanist and physician (standard botanical author abbreviation: de Vriese)
