= Dozi =

Town in Zabul province, Afghanistan

Dozi (Pashto: دوزي) is a village in the Dey Chopan District of Zabul Province, Afghanistan. The area is encompassed by the Dozi Mountains.
