= Devriès family =

Family of opera singers

The Devriès family were operatic singers over three generations, of Dutch descent. They were mainly active in France, Belgium and the USA in the second half of the 19th and the early 20th centuries.

== Rosa de Vries-van Os ==
A soprano (12 April 1824, The Hague - 30 March 1889, Rome), who made her debut in The Hague, and sang at the Théâtre d'Orléans in New Orleans, as well as Canada and Italy. She was the mother of Jeanne, Fidès, Maurice and Hermann.

== Jeanne Devriès ==
A soprano, born in New Orleans before 1850, died in 1924, Jeanne Devriès made her debut at the age of 17 at the Paris Théâtre Lyrique in June 1867 as Amina in La sonnambula (in French), when she was praised by one critic, who nonetheless felt that she was not a new Malibran. She took over the title role of Catherine Glover for the premiere of La jolie fille de Perth at the same theatre (originally intended for Christina Nilsson) later in 1867, and also sang Martha, and Rosina in The Barber of Seville. She married a Conservatoire prize-winner named Dereims, described as an 'intelligent singer' who sang widely in France and outside, and toured with him to Lisbon in 1878. Appearing as Jeanne Devriès-Dereims in Brussels, she sang in Les diamants de la couronne (Catarina) and Faust (Marguerite) in 1872-1873; in the 1879-80 season the Queen of the Night in La flûte enchantée (Nuitter/Beaumont). The rest of her career was spent in France.

== Fidès Devriès ==
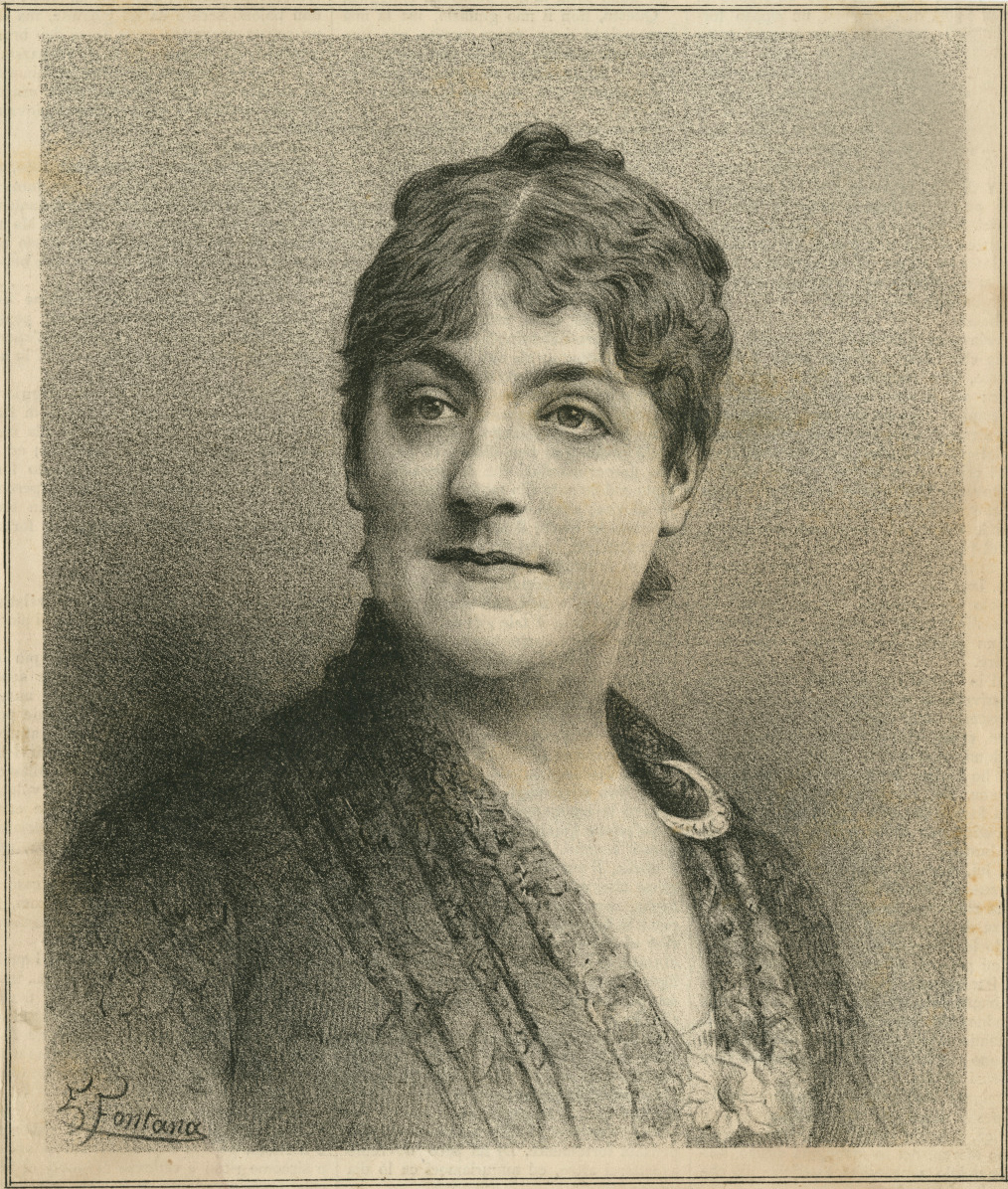
Fidès Devriès, c. 1885 (lithograph by Ernesto Fontana)

Fidès was born in New Orleans on 22 April 1852, and died in 1941, and was a soprano who studied under Duprez. She made her debut as Rose-de-Mai in Le val d'Andorre at the Théâtre Lyrique in October 1868. After a couple of seasons at La Monnaie in Brussels, she joined the Paris Opera in 1871, where her repertoire included Marguerite in Faust, Ophélie in Hamlet, Isabelle in Robert le diable, Agathe in Le Freischutz, Inès and Sélika in L’Africaine, Elvira in Don Juan, Mathilde in Guillaume Tell and Eudoxie in La Juive.

In February 1873 Devriès took the solo soprano part in Beethoven’s Choral Symphony with the Société des Concerts du Conservatoire, along with an aria from Don Giovanni.

She interrupted her career from April 1874 to 1883, after which she appeared at the Théâtre-Italien directed by Victor Maurel, singing in Simon Boccanegra and Hérodiade. Back at the Opéra, after touring to Monte-Carlo, Madrid, Lisbon and the Netherlands, she created the role of Chimène in the premiere of Le Cid on 30 November 1885. Her final major appearance was as Elsa in the French premiere of Lohengrin on 3 May 1887, before retiring from the stage in 1889.

== Maurice Devriès ==
Born New York in 1854, died Chicago in 1919, Maurice was a baritone. He made his debut in Liege in 1874 as Nevers in Les Huguenots. Having been engaged at La Monnaie in Brussels, he created the role of Gunther in Sigurd in 1884. His career also extended to Italy and the USA, where he appeared for the Metropolitan Opera from 1895-98 both in New York and on tour; his repertoire there included Roméo et Juliette, Carmen, Faust, the United States premiere of La Navarraise, Pagliacci, Fidelio, La Traviata, Les Pêcheurs de Perles, Cavalleria Rusticana, Manon, Die Meistersinger von Nürnberg and Lohengrin.

== Hermann Devriès ==
Born in New York in 1858, died in Chicago 1949, Hermann was a baritone, sometimes termed a bass. After studying with Faure he made his debut at the Paris Opera in 1878, and had become a leading bass in the chorus of the Opéra, where his family renown may have led to an engagement at the Opéra-Comique in 1880 for his debut in the first of 50 performances there as Lothario in Mignon. For the Metropolitan Opera he sang from 1898 to 1900 in Roméo et Juliette, Il Barbiere di Siviglia, Faust, Les Huguenots, Carmen, Don Giovanni, Das Rheingold, Le Prophète and Rigoletto.

== David Devriès ==
Son of Maurice, David Devriès was one of the leading French tenors of his day. After studies at the Paris Conservatoire he had a distinguished career centred on the Paris Opéra-Comique. He left several recordings.
