= Rheta DeVries =

American psychologist

Rheta Goolsby DeVries
- Born: September 1, 1936
- Died: May 28, 2012 (aged 75)

Academic work
- Institutions: University of Northern Iowa

Rheta Goolsby DeVries (1 September 1936, Arkansas – 28 May 2012, Little Rock, Arkansas) was a professor at University of Northern Iowa's Regent's Center For Early Developmental Education, where she also served as director. She co-wrote many books along with Constance Kamii, concerning early childhood education curriculum that both influenced the field of early childhood mathematical instruction and accelerated the proliferation of constructivist-based teaching in the classroom.

== Constructivist approaches ==
Like Kamii, DeVries studied under Jean Piaget and they shared the same interest in children's sociomoral development, construction of numbers and arithmetic, and understanding of reading and writing. Drawing from Piaget's theory, particularly, his ideas on moral, social, effective, and cognitive development, they began developing several approaches to constructivism. Piaget recognized their works constituting three books, which outlined a program that allows the young learner free choice of activity in a wide range of games and experiments.

DeVries also collaborated with other scholars such as Carolyn Hildebrandt and Betty Zan on works that focus on the application of Piagetian theory and the constructivist approaches to classrooms.

== Selected bibliography ==
- Programs of early education: The constructivist view ISBN 978-0-582-28301-5 (1987)
- Constructivist Early Education, Overview and Comparison With Our Program: Overview and Comparison With Other Programs ISBN 978-0935989335 (1989)
- Moral Classrooms, Moral Children: Creating a Constructivist Atmosphere in Early Education (Early Childhood Education Series) ISBN 978-0-8077-3341-7 (1994)
