= Myles de Vries =

English cricketer

Personal information
- Full name: Myles Fallows de Vries
- Born: 1940 (age 85–86); Harwich, Essex, England
- Batting: Unknown

Domestic team information
- Years: Team
- 1958: Berkshire

Career statistics
Competition	First-class
Matches	1
Runs scored	5
Batting average	2.50
100s/50s	–/–
Top score	4
Catches/stumpings	–/–
- Source: Cricinfo, 6 February 2019

Myles Fallows de Vries (born 1940) is a former English first-class cricketer.

Born at Harwich, de Vries played minor counties cricket for Berkshire in 1958, making two appearances in the Minor Counties Championship against Cornwall and Oxfordshire. He later played first-class cricket in Kenya for a Coast Cricket Association XI against a touring Pakistan International Airlines team at Mombasa in 1964. Batting twice during the match, de Vries was dismissed by Afaq Hussain for 4 runs in the Coast Cricket Association XI first-innings, while in their second-innings he was dismissed for a single run by Farooq Hamid. He later moved to Thailand, where he is credited with starting the Chiang Mai Sixes in 1988. He was previously employed by New Zealand Insurance and played cricket for the Royal Bangkok Sports Club. In recent years de Vries has been using a wheelchair.
