= Klaas de Vries (Christian Democratic Appeal) =

Dutch politician

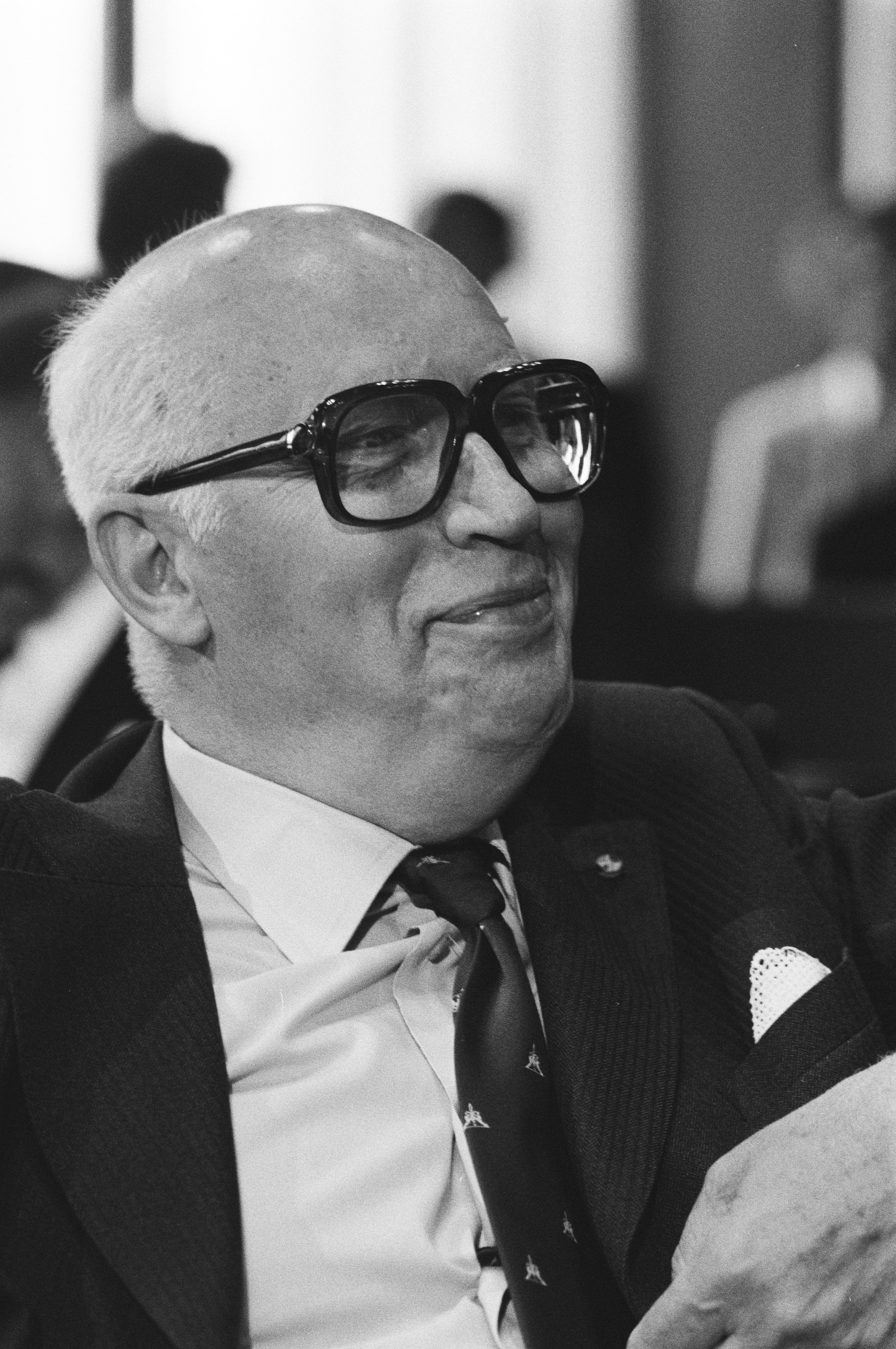

Member of the Senate
- In office 24 September 1974 – 23 June 1987
- In office 25 May 1971 – 17 September 1974
- In office 10 December 1968 – 10 May 1971

Personal details
- Born: Klaas de Vries; 11 November 1917 Bolsward, Netherlands
- Died: 21 August 1999 (aged 81) Leeuwarden, Netherlands
- Party: Christian Historical Union (1952–1980); Christian Democratic Appeal (from 1980)
- Education: University of Groningen (PhD)
- Occupation: Politician; Civil servant; Teacher

Military service
- Allegiance: The Netherlands
- Branch/service: Royal Netherlands Army
- Years of service: 1945–1948
- Battles/wars: World War II; Dutch resistance; Indonesian National Revolution

Klaas de Vries (11 November 1917 – 21 August 1999) was a Dutch politician. He was a member of the Senate from 1968 to 1987, first for the Christian Historical Union (CHU) and later for the Christian Democratic Appeal (CDA).

De Vries was born in 1917 in the Frisian town of Bolsward, the son of a teacher. During World War II, he was active in the Dutch resistance. From 1942 to 1945, he was in hiding.

He graduated cum laude in Dutch law from the University of Groningen in 1952. In 1955, he received his doctorate in law from the same university, again cum laude.

In 1968, he entered the Senate on behalf of the CHU. For the CHU, he was mainly active in the fields of culture, defence and education. From 1980 to 1987, he was a member of the Senate on behalf of the CDA, which had been formed in 1980 from the CHU, among others.

De Vries was married to Luwina PH Knossen and had two daughters and a son.
