= Hans de Vries =

Dutch economic historian (1927–2021)

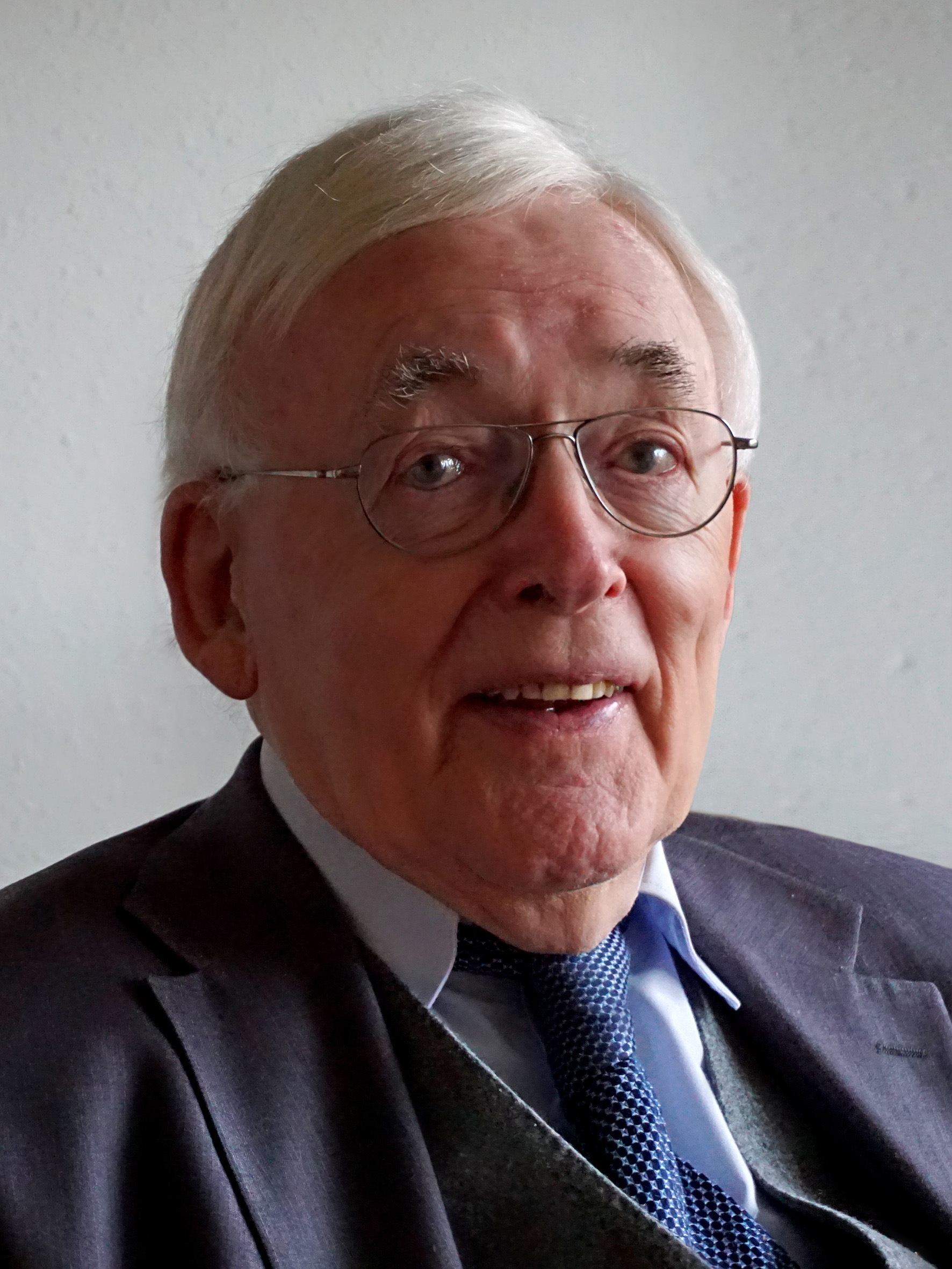
Hans de Vries in 2016

Johannes "Hans" de Vries (12 March 1927 – 13 October 2021) was a Dutch economic historian of the De Nederlandsche Bank.

De Vries was born in Heemstede on 12 March 1927. In 1959 he obtained his PhD in economic sciences at the University of Amsterdam under Ieb Brugmans with a thesis titled: "Economische achteruitgang der Republiek in de achttiende eeuw". He was elected member of the Royal Netherlands Academy of Arts and Sciences in 1979.

De Vries died in Bosch en Duin on 13 October 2021, at the age of 94.
