= Grisi =

Grisi may refer to:

- Alfredo Grisi (1900–1978), Mexican Olympic fencer
- Carlotta Grisi (1819–1899), Italian ballet dancer, cousin of Giuditta and Giulia
- Giuditta Grisi (1805–1840), Italian mezzo-soprano opera singer, sister of Giulia
- Giulia Grisi (1811–1869), Italian soprano opera singer, sister of Giuditta
