= Abe de Vries =

Frisian poet, essayist and literary critic (born 1965)

Abe de Vries (10 January 1965) is a Frisian poet, essayist, literary critic, journalist, editor, translator and photographer.

== Biography ==
De Vries was born in Winaam, a small village in the province of Friesland, in the north of the Netherlands. He grew up bilingual; West Frisian was the community's everyday language, although it was not the culture language, which was, and still is, Dutch. After completing the secondary school Simon Vestdijk in Harns, he studied political science at the University of Amsterdam. At the time, in 1983, this study in Amsterdam still had a Marxist orientation, which would constitute an important influence in life and works of De Vries. While living in Amsterdam, he developed a major interest in literature, particularly in poetry.

After his conscription De Vries remained in military service for another six years, now working as a contract-based intelligence-officer. From 1993 until 1996 he studied history in Groningen. His professor Frank Ankersmit, despite being an obvious liberal, had a significant influence on De Vries's thinking, through his intellectual, theoretical approach of historiography.

Meanwhile, De Vries educated the members of the peace keeping force in Bosnia and Croatia about the backgrounds of the conflict in those countries, and he wrote opinion articles on the conflict for every Dutch newspaper. In 1996 he became a journalist for the General Press Bureau Tammeling in Groningen. In 1999, motivated by dissatisfaction with the emotional and biased news coverage, he became a correspondent in Belgrade for the ANP, and the Dutch journals Trouw and Elsevier. From 2000 until 2006 he was a foreign correspondent for Elsevier. For his assignments he traveled to former Yugoslavia, Romania, Hungary, Austria, the Czech Republic, France, Poland, Russia, and Afghanistan, as well as other destinations.

In the early 2000s, De Vries was a contributing poet, and also a member of the editorial staff, for the innovative and wayward literary magazine Kistwurk. In February 2003, De Vries started the literary magazine Farsk, of which he was the chief editor until 2006. He also wrote a one-man magazine on the Internet, Oranzjery De Kopspiker, which, in 2010, was succeeded by the weblog Seedyksterfeartfisk. That has been the leading Frisian literary blog for a number of years, with content that informed the artistic-cultural as well as the environmental activist discourse.

In the beginning of 2005 he succeeded Jabik Veenbaas as the prose reviewer for the main Frisian newspaper the Leeuwarder Courant. From 2006 until 2011 he was a publisher at the publishing house Friese Pers Boekerij/Noordhoek. Since 2011 he has been associated with the newspaper Friesch Dagblad, first as a review writer for Frisian poetry and essayistic publications, journalist of common cultural topics and columnist of the weekly column "Skroeier", and since 2014 also as senior editor.

In 2015 De Vries, along with Friduwih Riemersma, started the literary magazine Fers2, a digital platform for critical, independent literature and radical literary research.

== Poetry ==
In his youth De Vries started writing Dutch poems. In 2002 he made his debut in Friesland with the collection De weromkommer yn it ûnlân (The returner in the nonland). Poems from this collection were published earlier in the Frisian literary magazines Trotwaer, Hjir en Kistwurk.

In his early poetry he sought a balance between the present and his lost youth in Winaam, with its related theme of lost love. Eastern Europe was also often a subject in his poems from that period. Later on, love, the search for the significant other, and the finding and subsequent losing of security, came to be the prominent themes for his poetry. In addition, this poetry expresses consideration for the West Frisian language, which is a dying language, and for the history and violation of the North Frisian coastal region, and the marginal position of the Frisian speaking artist. De Vries's lyrical poetry shows the development from primarily image-focused poems toward a broader, more narrative poetic style, in which the music of language has been given ample scope.

In 2005 De Vries received the Gysbert Japicx Award for his second collection In waarm wek altyd (A warm ice-hole forever). As a result, he was the fourth Frisian author, after Trinus Riemersma, Jan Wybenga and Willem Abma, who was awarded for a young oeuvre; there had never been such a short time between the start of the profession in the belles-lettres and receiving the Gysbert Japicx Award, as in the case of awarding the prize to De Vries.

In January 2013 the sixth collection was published, Ravensulver/Ravenzilver (Ravensilver). The seventh collection, Brek dyn klank (Missing your sound) came two years later, in 2015. Brek dyn klank further examines post-modern uprooted relationships, but from a more delicate perspective, and more drawn from experience than the earlier works, while at the same time preserving the classical form.

== Essays ==
De Vries is also one of the main essay writers in Friesland. Several of his essays have found their way as introductions to anthologies or omnibus volumes. The essay collections about the Frisian literature, Identiteit & kowesturten (Identity & cow tails, 2008) and Erfskip & krisis (Heritage & crisis, 2015) are an idiosyncratic mix of empirical literary history, philosophical cultural criticism, and personal reflection on his own roots.

== Photography ==
The photo works explore the interface between documentary photography and art photography. The Frisian landscape frequently is the subject and the muse. Some series were shown in gallery exhibitions; other photo series were published in photography books.

== Bibliography ==
=== Poetry ===
- 2002 - De weromkommer yn it ûnlân (The returner in the nonland)
- 2004 - In waarm wek altyd (A warm ice-hole forever)
- 2006 - Under fearne goaden (Under deprived gods)
- 2006 - Warme boxkachels & weke irenes / Waarme bokskachels & weake irenes (Warm box stoves & squashy irenes; bilingual anthology)
- 2008 - Fangst fan 'e demoandolfyn (Catch of the demon-dolphin)
- 2010 - Sprankeskyn (Sparkshine)
- 2013 - Ravensulver/Ravenzilver (Ravensilver)
- 2015 - Brek dyn klank (Missing your sound)
- 2017 - Opskuorgebieten (Demolished areas)
- 2019 - Mienskar, sonnetten (Common ground) published only as pdf
- 2020 - Blaumelly (Atriplex)
- 2021 - Ik haw myn kobist fêstbûn oan in appelbeam / Ik bond mijn koe vast aan een appelboom (I tied my cow to an apple tree) bilingual anthology
- 2023 - Bloedprikke (Blood drawing)

=== Essays ===
- 2008 - Identiteit & kowesturten. Essays oer Fryske literatuer (Identity & cow tails. Essays on Frisian literature)
- 2015 - Erfskip & krisis. Essays oer Fryslân en Fryske literatuer 2 (Heritage & crisis. Essays on Friesland and Frisian literature 2)

=== Translations ===
- 2007 - Sjoerd Spanninga - Indian Summer. Een keuze uit zijn gedichten (with co-translator Jabik Veenbaas)
- 2013 - Ynferno (Inferno, by Dan Brown)
- 2017 - Hoe't God ferdwûn út Jorwert (Hoe God verdween uit Jorwerd, by Geert Mak)
- 2019 - In rûgel wyt. Gedichten fan Robert Frost
- 2019 - Mijn harp is voor jou (anthology from the poems by Pieter Jelles Troelstra)
- 2020 - Boechbylden (anthology from the poems of J.J. Slauerhoff; co-translator Eppie Dam)
- 2021 - Testament van de ziel (by Hylke Speerstra)
- 2023 - Do, lêste rebel! / Jij, laatste rebel! (poems by H.H. ter Balkt)

=== Other works ===
- 2004 - It sil bestean (Essay and anthology from the works of Obe Postma)
- 2005 - Skielk beart de hjerst (Essay and anthology from the works of fan Douwe Kiestra)
- 2008 - Het goud op de weg. De Friese poëzie sinds 1880 (Frisian poetry since 1880; anthology)
- 2009 - Boerewurk (Farm work) - photo's by Johannes Doedes de Jong
- 2009 - Giftige Zomer / Giftige Simmer (Toxic summer, edited in cooperation with Albertina Soepboer)
- 2011 - "Fergettten pommerant. De poëzij fan Tjitte Piebenga as 'missing link'" (Introduction to the Collected works - Poetry of Tjitte Piebenga)
- 2012 - "De tsjustere Apollo" (Introduction to the Collected poems of Jan Wybenga)
- 2013 - Bulldozers en bloednoazen. De stadsrand van Leeuwarden. (Photos from the outskirts of the city Ljouwert)
- 2014 - Friesland-Fryslân (Photos from Friesland)
- 2016 - Marten Hepkes Bakker: Dan krije ek de fûgels dien (Essay and anthology from the works of Marten Hepkes Bakker)

== Awards ==
- 2002 - Rely Jorritsma Award - poetry cycle Fersen fan ferjitten (Songs of forgetting)
- 2005 - Gysbert Japicx Award - poetry collection In waarm wek altyd (A warm ice-hole forever)
