= Margaret Garritsen de Vries =

American economist

- Born: February 11, 1922; Detroit, Michigan
- Died: December 18, 2009 (aged 87); Bethesda, Maryland
- Citizenship: United States
- Education: University of Michigan; Massachusetts Institute of Technology
- Spouse: Barend de Vries
- Awards: Carolyn Shaw Bell Award, 2002; Outstanding Washington Woman Economist, 1987
- Scientific career
- Fields: Economics; Economic history
- Workplaces: International Monetary Fund
- Doctoral advisor: Paul Samuelson

Margaret Garritsen de Vries (1922–2009) was an economist and historian known for her work for the International Monetary Fund.

== Education ==
deVries received her B.A. from the University of Michigan and her Ph.D. from the Massachusetts Institute of Technology (MIT) in 1946, under the direction of Paul Samuelson.

== International Monetary Fund career ==
She was among the first employees of the International Monetary Fund in 1946. She represented the agency on missions to many countries around the world, and became a division chief at the fund in 1957, nearly twenty years before any other women did the same. After leaving the fund as an economist as a condition of adopting her children, she returned part-time as a historian of the institution, eventually serving as the IMF's official historian from 1973 until her retirement in 1987.

== Awards and legacy ==
She was awarded the Carolyn Shaw Bell Award in 2002 in recognition of her work mentoring women in the economics profession.

The American Economic Association established the Margaret deVries Memorial Fund in her memory in 2010. This fund is used to pay registration fees for graduate students whose papers have been selected for presentation session at the AEA Annual meetings sponsored by the Committee on the Status of Women in the Economics Profession. In addition, MIT established the Margaret Garritsen deVries Scholarship Fund to assist female graduate students in the field of economics.

== Selected works ==
- De Vries, Margaret Garritsen (1986). The IMF in a changing world 1945-85. International Monetary Fund.
- De Vries, Margaret Garritsen (1987). Balance of payments adjustment, 1945 to 1986: The IMF experience. International Monetary Fund. ISBN 978-0-939934-93-5.
