= Warren DeVries =

American mechanical engineer

Warren Richard DeVries is an American mechanical engineer.

== Early life and education ==
DeVries's father and grandfather worked for Case Corporation. Warren DeVries earned two Bachelor's of Science degrees in 1971, the first in letters and engineering from Calvin College and the second in mechanical engineering from the University of Wisconsin–Madison. He remained at UW–Madison to complete a Master's of Science in mechanical engineering in 1973, followed by a doctorate in the subject alongside minors in statistics and electrical and computer engineering in 1975.

== Career ==
After serving as lecturer at UW–Madison for two years, DeVries became an assistant professor at the University of Michigan until 1982. Upon joining the Rensselaer Polytechnic Institute that year, DeVries was promoted to associate professor. DeVries was appointed to a full professorship in 1994, and left RPI in 1996 for Iowa State University, where he was chair of the mechanical engineering department until 2002. DeVries moved from Iowa State to the University of Maryland, Baltimore County in 2006, to serve as dean of engineering and information technology. He stepped down from the deanship in 2014, and retained a professorship until retiring with emeritus status in 2018.

== Awards and honors ==
DeVries was elected a fellow of the American Society of Mechanical Engineers in 1997. The ASME elevated DeVries to honorary membership in 2014.
