= Roel de Vries (engineer) =

Dutch born engineer and businessman (born 1968)

- Born: April 1968 (age 58); Netherlands
- Education: Hogeschool Eindhoven, University of Groningen
- Occupations: Corporate Vice President, Global Head of Marketing Nissan Motor Corporation

Roel de Vries (born April 1968) is a Dutch born engineer and businessman. He is Chief Operating Officer at City Football Group.

== Biography ==
=== Early life ===
Roel de Vries was born in April 1968 in the Netherlands. He received a bachelor's degree in Industrial Engineering from Hogeschool Eindhoven, and a master's degree in Business Administration from the University of Groningen.

=== Career ===
His first employer was the family's pastry and bakery business. In 1994 de Vries joined Nissan at the European head-office in Amsterdam. In 1998, he relocated to South Africa, where he became Director of Marketing and Sales. In South Africa, de Vries "had a chance to meet Nelson Mandela a few times. His approach to leadership and getting things done despite circumstances just blew me away."

In 2008, de Vries moved to Nissan's Global Headquarters in Yokohama, Japan. Through 2009, he was General Manager Product Planning General Overseas Markets. From 2009 to 2010, he was Program Director for Nissan's all rear wheel drive vehicles. In November 2010, he was named Corporate Vice President, Global Head of Marketing and Brand Strategy. Under de Vries, Nissan was named one of the best global brands of 2014.

=== Hobbies ===
His hobbies include running, golf and skiing.

=== Cars ===
In Japan, de Vries drives a Nissan Elgrand. The first car he bought was a white Autobianchi A112.

== See also ==
- Nissan
