= Bouke de Vries =

Dutch ceramics artist

- Born: Utrecht, Netherlands
- Education: Design Academy Eindhoven, Central Saint Martins College of Art and Design
- Known for: Ceramic art, Porcelain
- Website: Bouke de Vries Website

Bouke de Vries is a London-based Dutch artist specializing in Ceramic art and porcelain.

== Education ==
Born in Utrecht, Netherlands, Bouke de Vries studied at the Design Academy Eindhoven, and Central Saint Martins College of Art and Design, London. He has worked with John Galliano, Stephen Jones and Zandra Rhodes before retraining in ceramics conservation and restoration, a skill that is integral to his recently developed artistic practice." At first, de Vries made a steady living as a private conservator fixing broken pieces, sometimes working on pieces that weren't even worth the cost of fixing, in which cases many clients would leave him with the pieces. This devaluation of art began to bother him, ultimately causing him to change careers. Bouke de Vries was one of London's leading ceramic conservators – then he began making sculptures from broken china and porcelain and became an instant darling of collectors. He was soon picked up by Kay Saatchi for the 2009 Murmurart show at Selfridges where he sold all three selected works including "NO NO NO," his reflection on late singer Amy Winehouse. It was at this show that the piece sold to art collector Anita Zabludowicz, wife of Poju Zabludowicz.

== Works ==
His series of works based on Mao Zedong are heavily rooted in his Dutch background. "Mao is the only 20th century dictator who is still un-toppled despite being the one who was responsible for more millions of deaths of his own people than all the others put together. The series uses 1960s Cultural Revolution cult-of-personality porcelain busts and statues." Bouke states that his thousands of hand made skulls are "meant to represent the millions who died because of his whims." Although his inspiration largely comes from nature and spirituality, when it comes to Mao there is a different energy surrounding his pieces. "The skulls also remind us that we too will die…of course we all turn to dust in the end, but earthly pleasures kick against this inevitability. Art is one way in which we can outlive our own mortality, it lives on after us."

As his career change away from the fashion world took root, "he was regularly offered pieces given up by their owners that, despite the traces of their use, had not lost any of their original charm." In his 'exploded' works, he takes advantage of the leftover characteristics and charm of these pieces. Instead of attempting to erase the traces of use and damage, he elaborates on it, so that these works gain a new lease of life. In June 2011 he collaborated with jewellery designer Annoushka Ducas for Precious. This month-long exhibit displayed 10 exploded art works by Bouke de Vries incorporating jewellery by Annoushka Ducas. He created these sculptures from reclaimed broken ceramics. Arriving on the aspects of nature and spirituality which inform the pieces and, adorning them with butterfly and dragonfly pendants, garnets, pearls as well as drusy stone, proved an organic, free-form process for Bouke and Annoushka. "There was no brief,” concedes Annoushka. “As we started to work together, I discovered there were a lot of elements present in Annoushka’s work that are also present in mine, such as butterfly and dragonfly motifs – so it was a good fit,” adds Bouke.

== Inspiration ==
In an interview by Pallant House Gallery, de Vries was quoted saying, "We all carry around a mental compendium of things that inspire us. I'm inspired by the broken and discarded ceramic objects I find. They suggest situations, connections, compositions, which I then translate into sculptures." Bouke describes his style as, "Reconstruction meets deconstruction." When asked who has influenced him most the artist replied, "The wonderfully eclectic exhibitions put on by Axel Vervoordt at the Palazzo Fortuny in Venice were inspiring." When about his artwork by Another Magazine Bouke said, "I feel like the medium of sculpture chose me because my artwork grew from my work as a ceramics conservator, except I deconstruct rather than reconstruct, giving new life to the discarded and the rejected."

== Influences ==
Bouke de Vries' Memory Vessel 35 (2015) was used on the cover of O Amor é Essa Luz no Fim do Nada (2019), by Brazilian poet Robertson Frizero, with the permission of the artist.

== See also ==
- Ceramic art
- Porcelain
- Mao Zedong
