= Frisian language (disambiguation) =

Frisian language may refer to:

- The Frisian languages, a closely related group of six Germanic languages:
  - West Frisian languages (fry), a family of four Frisian languages spoken in the Netherlands and often known there simply as the Frisian language
    - Hindeloopen Frisian, spoken in the city of Hindeloopen and the village of Molkwerum in the Netherlands
    - Schiermonnikoog Frisian, spoken on the island of Schiermonnikoog, Netherlands
    - Terschelling Frisian, spoken on the island of Terschelling, Netherlands. Terschelling Frisian and Westlauwers Frisian together form the Westlauwers–Terschellings language family
    - Westlauwers Frisian (fry), or Western Frisian, spoken throughout West Frisia more than any of the other West Frisian languages.
  - Saterland Frisian (stq), or East Frisian language, spoken in Lower Saxony, Germany
  - North Frisian (frr), spoken in Schleswig-Holstein, Germany
- East Frisian Low Saxon (frs), the West Low German dialect of East Frisia, Lower Saxony, Germany. The name Frisia specifically refers to the region not its provenance, as the dialect is not a Frisian dialect but a Saxon one.
