= Regional and minority languages in Europe =

The various regional and minority languages in Europe encompass four categories:

- The language of a community in one single country, where the language community is not the linguistic majority, e.g. Sorbian in Germany, or Welsh in the United Kingdom
- The language of a community in two or more countries, in neither of which they are the linguistic majority, e.g. Basque in Spain and France, Sámi in Finland, Norway, Russia and Sweden, or Lombard in Italy and Switzerland
- The language of a community who are a linguistic minority in one country, even though they are the majority in a different country, e.g. Danish in Germany, Finnish in Sweden, or Swedish in Finland
- Languages without any fixed territory, that are traditionally spoken in one or more countries, but which cannot be assorted to one specific region, e.g. the languages of Sinti and Roma, the Yiddish language, the Yenish language as well as Plautdietsch

Dialects and languages of immigrants are not included in the official definition of the European Charter for Regional or Minority Languages.

The European Union regards Luxembourgish as a minority language, too, as it is not an official language of the EU. Through June 13, 2005, the Irish language also had this status.

In recent years, some countries of the EU have begun assorting the status as a minority language to various sign languages.

== Countries with linguistic minorities ==
=== Albania ===
- Aromanian
- Greek
- Macedonian
- Romani
- Serbian
- Turkish

=== Andorra ===
- French
- Spanish

=== Austria ===
- Burgenland Croatian in Burgenland
- Yenish
- Romani
- Slovak in Vienna
- Slovene in Carinthia and Styria
- Czech in Vienna
- Hungarian in Burgenland and Vienna

=== Belarus ===
- Latvian
- Lithuanian
- Polish
- Romani
- Rusyn
- Slovak
- Tatar
- Ukrainian

=== Belgium ===
- French
- Flemish Dutch
- Walloon
- German
- Limburgish
- Luxembourgish
- Lorrain
- Picard
- Champenois
- Romani

=== Bosnia and Herzegovina ===
- Albanian
- Bulgarian
- Czech
- German
- Hungarian
- Italian
- Ladino
- Polish
- Romani
- Romanian
- Rusyn
- Slovak
- Slovene
- Turkish
- Ukrainian
- Yiddish

=== Bulgaria ===
- Armenian
- Aromanian
- Croatian
- Czech
- German
- Hungarian
- Macedonian
- Polish
- Romani
- Romanian
- Russian
- Rusyn
- Serbian
- Slovak
- Tatar
- Turkish
- Ukrainian
- Yiddish

=== Croatia ===
- Albanian
- Bosnian
- Bulgarian
- Czech
- German
- Hebrew
- Hungarian
- Italian
- Istriot
- Istro-Romanian
- Macedonian
- Montenegrin
- Polish
- Romani
- Romanian
- Russian
- Pannonian Rusyn, also known as Ruthenian
- Serbian
- Slovak
- Slovene
- Turkish
- Ukrainian
- Vlach

=== Cyprus ===
- Armenian
- Turkish
- Cypriot Arabic

=== Czech Republic ===
- German
- Polish in the region near the border
- Romani
- Slovak

=== Denmark ===
- German (in Northern Schleswig)
- Romani
- Danish Sign language
- Faroese
- Inuit

=== Estonia ===
- Russian
- Ukrainian
- Võro (South Estonian)

=== Finland ===
- Swedish (Finland Swedish), finlandssvenska
- Inari Sami, anarâškielâ
- Northern Sami, davvisámegiella
- Skolt Sami, sää´mkiõll
- Karelian (Livvi-Karelian language, livvinkarjala, and Karelian Karelian Proper - vienankarjala, suvikarjala and tverinkariela)
- Finnish Romani, kaalengo tšimb/romano tšimb
- Finland-Swedish Sign Language
- Finnish Sign Language
- Mishar Tatar (language of the Finnish Tatars)

=== France ===
- Franco-Provençal
- Picard
- Norman
- Gallo
- Lorrain
- Poitevin-Saintongeaix
- Burgundian
- Champenois
- Franc-comptois
- Basque
- Breton
- German (Alsatian dialect and Lorraine Franconian)
- Italian
- Yenish
- Catalan
- Corsican
- Dutch
- Occitan
- Romani
- Antillean creole
- Arawak
- Guyana creole
- Hmong
- Kali'na
- Nenge
- Palikur
- Saamaka
- Sranan tongo
- Teko
- Wayampi
- Wayana
- Shimaore
- Kibushe

=== Germany ===
- Danish in Schleswig-Holstein
- Yenish
- Low German (possibly incl. Plautdietsch)
- Low Franconian in North Rhine-Westphalia, incl. Limburgish and Kleverlandish
- Central Franconian in North Rhine-Westphalia, incl. Ripuarian
- Upper German in Bavaria and Baden-Württemberg, incl. Bavarian and Swabian
- North Frisian in Schleswig-Holstein
- Romani
- Saterland Frisian in Lower Saxony
- Sorbian in Lusatia, specifically:
  - Upper Sorbian language in Upper Lusatia, in Saxony
  - Lower Sorbian in Lower Lusatia, in Brandenburg

=== Greece ===
- Arvanitika
- Aromanian
- Bulgarian
- Macedonian
- Megleno-Romanian
- Romani
- Tsakonika
- Judaeo-Spanish
- Turkish

=== Hungary ===
- Armenian
- Bulgarian
- Czech
- German
- Greek
- Croatian
- Polish
- Romani
- Romanian
- Rusyn
- Serbian
- Slovak
- Slovene
- Turkish
- Ukrainian

=== Ireland ===
- Shelta
- Irish

=== Italy ===
- Albanian
- German (regional official language in Trentino-Alto Adige/Südtirol)
  - various Highest Alemannic German and southern Bavarian dialects (e.g. the Cimbrian language)
  - Walser German (Aosta Valley and Piedmont)
- Franco-Provençal
- French (regionally an official language in Aosta Valley)
- Friulian
- Gallo-Italic languages
  - Piedmontese
  - Ligurian
  - Lombard
    - Western Lombard
    - Eastern Lombard
  - Emilian-Romagnol
    - Emilian dialect
    - Romagnol dialect
- Greek (also Griko in Calabria and Apulia)
- Catalan (in Alghero)
- Croatian
  - Molise Slavonic
- Ladin (regionally an official language in Trentino-Alto Adige/Südtirol; also insular occurrence in Province of Belluno)
- Neapolitan
- Occitan
- Sardinian (regionally an official language in Sardinia)
- Sicilian
- Slovene (regionally an official language in Triest and Gorizia)
- Venetian
- Romani

=== Kazakhstan (European part) ===
- Russian

=== Kosovo ===
- Bosnian
- Gora
- Romani
- Turkish
- Serbian (second official language)

=== Latvia ===
- Estonian
- Modern Hebrew
- Lithuanian
- Polish
- Romani
- Russian
- Ukrainian
- Belarusian

=== Lithuania ===
- Karaim
- Latvian
- Polish
- Romani
- Russian
- Tatar
- Ukrainian
- Belarusian

=== Moldova ===
- Bulgarian
- Gagauz
- Russian
- Ukrainian

=== Montenegro ===
- Albanian
- Bosnian
- Croatian
- Serbian
- Romani

=== Netherlands ===
- Limburgish, related to Aachen Dialect in the German-speaking region of eastern Belgium and in Vaals / Kerkrade.
- Low Saxon
- Romani
- West Frisian
  - Hindeloopen-Frisian
  - Schiermonnikoog Frisian
  - Westlauwers–Terschellings, including Terschelling Frisian and the most widespread Mainland West Frisian

=== North Macedonia ===
- Albanian
- Aromanian
- Bosnian
- Megleno-Romanian
- Romani
- Serbian
- Turkish

=== Norway ===
- Kven
- Lule Sami
- Northern Sami
- Southern Sámi

=== Poland ===
- German, as an auxiliary language in a number of municipalities, mainly in Upper Silesia
- Kashubian, also known as Cassubian, in Kashubia, Pomeranian Voivodeship; the language is taught up to A-level
- Yiddish language
- Lithuanian in the region bordering Lithuania
- Romani
- Slovak in the region bordering Slovakia
- Tatar in the region bordering Belarus
- Czech in the region bordering the Czech Republic
- Ukrainian in the border area to Ukraine, as well as spoken by many immigrants
- Belarusian in the border area to Belarus

=== Portugal ===
- Mirandese, around Miranda do Douro
- Lusitanic, by portuguese Sephardi Jews.
- Caló, by portuguese Romani

=== Romania ===
- Aromanian
- Bulgarian
- German
- Yiddish
- Croatian
- Polish
- Romani
- Rusyn
- Russian
- Serbian
- Slovak
- Tatarça
- Czech
- Turkish
- Ukrainian
- Hungarian

=== Russia (European part) ===
- Armenian
- Bashkir
- German
- Finnish
- Ingrian, also called Izhorian
- Kalmyk
- Karelian
  - Ludic
  - Livvi-Karelian, also called Southern Olonetsian
- Komi
  - Komi-Permyak
  - Komi-Zyryan
- Mari
  - Hill-Mari
  - Meadow-Mari
  - Northwestern Mari
- Mordvinic
  - Erzya
  - Moksha
- Nenets
  - Forest Nenets
  - Tundra Nenets
- Romani
- Sami
  - Kildin Sami
  - Skolt Sami
  - Ter Sami
- Tatar
- Chuvash
- Udmurt
- Ukrainian
- Belarusian
- Veps
- Votic

=== Serbia ===
- Albanian
- Aromanian
- Bosnian
- Bulgarian
- Croatian
- Czech
- German
- Greek
- Hungarian
- Macedonian
- Romani
- Romanian
- Rusyn
- Slovak
- Turkish

=== Slovakia ===
- German
- Romani
- Rusyn
- Czech
- Ukrainian
- Hungarian

=== Slovenia ===
- Bosnian
- German
- Italian
- Croatian
- Romani
- Serbian
- Macedonian
- Albanian
- Czech
- Slovak
- Hungarian
- Romanian
- Bulgarian
- Turkish
- Polish

=== Spain ===
- Aragonese
- Aranese (= Occitan in France)
- Asturian
- Basque in Basque Country and Navarre
- Caló
- Galician in Galicia
- Catalan in Catalonia
  - Valencian language
  - Balearic Catalan
- Leonese in Castile and León
- Quinqui, language of the Mercheros, a semi-nomadic group who live mainly in the northern half of Spain
- Romani

=== Sweden ===
- Elfdalian
- Danish
- Finnish
- Gutnish
- Jämtska, also called Jämtmål
- Yiddish
- Meänkieli, also called Torne Valley Finnish
- Romani
- Sámi languages, formerly also called Lappish (falling out of use; pejorative)

=== Switzerland ===
- German (minority language in Bosco/Gurin and Ederswiler)
- French (official language)
- Italian (official language)
- Sign languages:
  - Swiss-German Sign language
  - Swiss-French Sign language, recognized in Canton of Geneva
  - Swiss-Italian Sign language
- Lombard language, varieties in Grisons and Ticino
- Franco-Provençal
- Yenish, recognized as territorially unbound language
- Yiddish language, recognized minority language
- Rhaeto-Romance; Romansch official language in Grisons
- Romani, language of the Sinti; Sinti recognized as national minority

=== Turkey ===
- Adyghe, also known as West Circassian
- Arab
- Aramaic
- Armenian
- Bosnian
- Georgian
- Greek
- Kurmanji
- Laz
- Romani
- Zaza
- Azerbaijani
- Gagauz
- Crimean Tatar
- Tatar
- Turkmen
- Uygur
- Uzbek

=== Ukraine ===
- Bulgarian
- German
- Gagauz
- Yiddish
- Crimean Tatar
- Polish
- Romani
- Romanian
- Russian
- Rusyn
- Tatar
- Turkish
- Hungarian
- Belarusian

=== United Kingdom ===
- Irish, as a regional official language in Northern Ireland
- Cornish, regional official language in Cornwall
- Scottish Gaelic, regional official language in Scotland
- Scots
- Shelta
- Ulster Scots
- Welsh, a national official language in Wales
- British Sign Language, regional official language in Scotland, recognised minority language in England and Wales

==== British Crown Dependencies ====
- Manx, regional official language of the Isle of Man
- Jèrriais, a Norman dialect spoken in Jersey and Sark, also known as Jersey Norman French
- Guernésiais, a dialect of Norman French spoken in Guernsey
- Sercquiais, a Norman dialect spoken in Sark

== See also ==
- European Charter for Regional or Minority Languages
- Eurolinguistics
