= Imperativus pro infinitivo =

Syntactic feature of a verb

Imperativus pro infinitivo is a syntactic feature in which a verbal form superficially resembling the imperative mood is realized, instead of the expected infinitive.

The imperativus pro infinitivo is a feature of, for example, the Frisian languages.

- North Frisian (Mooring): Ik häi änjörsne niinj lust än mååg seelew wat tu ääsen klåår.
- Sater Frisian: Ik hiede jêrsene neen lûst on moakje selwen wet to iten kloar.
- West Frisian: Ik hie juster gjin nocht en meitsje sels wat te iten klear.

The sentences read in English: 'Yesterday I did not feel like making dinner myself'.
