= Frisian languages =

Group of Germanic languages

Frisian
- West Frisian: Frysk; Saterland Frisian: Fräisk; North Frisian: Friisk, fresk, freesk, frasch, fräisch, freesch
- Geographic distribution: Netherlands and Germany. West Frisian: Friesland, Westerkwartier; Saterland Frisian: Saterland; North Frisian: Nordfriesland, Heligoland
- Ethnicity: Frisians
- Linguistic classification: Indo-European: Germanic; West Germanic; North Sea Germanic; Anglo-Frisian; Frisian
- Early forms: Old Frisian: Middle Frisian
- Subdivisions: West Frisian; North Frisian; East Frisian (including Saterland Frisian); Old South Frisian †

Language codes
- Glottolog: fris1239
- Linguasphere: 52-ACA
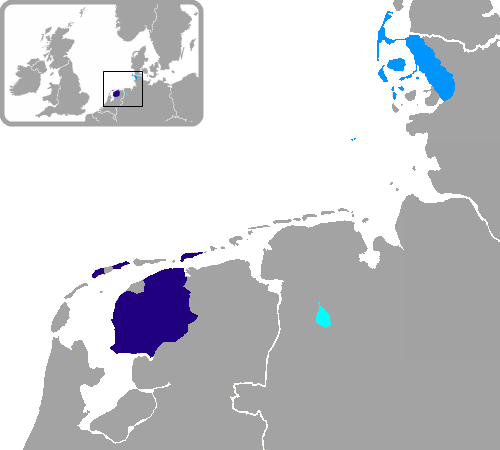
- Present-day distribution of the Frisian languages in Europe: West Frisian North Frisian Saterland Frisian

The Frisian languages (/ˈfriː.ʒən/ FREE-zhən or /ˈfrɪz.i.ən/ FRIZ-ee-ən) are a closely related group of West Germanic languages, spoken by about 400,000 Frisian people, who live on the southern fringes of the North Sea in the Netherlands and Germany. The Frisian languages are the closest living language group to the Anglic languages; the two groups make up the Anglo-Frisian languages group and together with the Low German dialects these form the North Sea Germanic languages. Despite the close genetic relationship between English and Frisian, the modern languages are not mutually intelligible. Geographical and historical circumstances have caused the two languages to drift apart linguistically.

Frisian is traditionally divided into three branches often labeled distinct Frisian languages even though the dialects within each branch are not necessarily mutually intelligible. West Frisian is by far the most spoken of the three and is an official language in the Dutch province of Friesland, where it is spoken on the mainland and on two of the West Frisian Islands: Terschelling and Schiermonnikoog. It is also spoken in four villages in the Westerkwartier of the neighbouring province of Groningen. North Frisian, the second branch, is spoken in the northernmost German district of Nordfriesland in the state of Schleswig-Holstein, on the North Frisian mainland and on the North Frisian Islands of Sylt, Föhr, Amrum, and the Halligs. It is also spoken on the islands of Heligoland and Düne in the North Sea. The third Frisian branch, East Frisian, has only one remaining variant, Sater Frisian, spoken in the municipality of Saterland in the Lower Saxon district of Cloppenburg. Surrounded by bogs, the four Saterlandic villages lie just outside the borders of East Frisia, in the Oldenburg Münsterland region. In East Frisia proper, East Frisian Low Saxon is spoken today, which is not a Frisian language, but a variant of Low German/Low Saxon with a strong East Frisian substrate.

For many centuries, Frisian has been strongly influenced by Dutch, and the two language areas share a long intertwined history. As a result, Dutch is the Germanic language most similar to Frisian in practice, even though Frisian is genealogically closer to English and Scots. The degree of mutual intelligibility between Frisian and Dutch is debated, with a 2005 cloze test, in which a portion of text is masked and the participant is asked to fill in the masked portion of text, showing that Dutch respondents scored 31.9% when presented with a (West) Frisian text, whereas researchers in 2012 concluded that the linguistic distance between Dutch and the Frisian dialects were slightly smaller than the distances between the Scandinavian languages, which are known to be largely mutually intelligible.

== Division ==
There are three main groups of Frisian varieties: West Frisian, Saterland Frisian, and North Frisian. Some linguists consider these three varieties, despite their mutual unintelligibility, to be dialects of one single Frisian language, whereas others consider them to be a number of separate languages equal to or greater than the number of main branches discussed here. Indeed, the insular varieties of West Frisian are not intelligible to the mainland, and by that standard are additional languages, and North Frisian is also divided into several strongly diverse dialects, which are not all mutually intelligible among themselves. West Frisian is strongly influenced by Dutch. The other Frisian languages, meanwhile, have been influenced by Low German and German. Stadsfries and West Frisian Dutch are not Frisian, but Dutch dialects influenced by West Frisian. Frisian is called Frysk in West Frisian, Fräisk in Saterland Frisian, and Friisk, fresk, freesk, frasch, fräisch, and freesch in the varieties of North Frisian.

The situation in the Dutch province of Groningen and the German region of East Frisia is similar: The local Low German/Low Saxon dialects of Gronings and East Frisian Low Saxon still bear some Frisian elements due to East Frisian substrate. Frisian was spoken there at one time, only to have been gradually replaced by Low Saxon since the Middle Ages. This local language is now, like Frisian, under threat by standard Dutch and German.

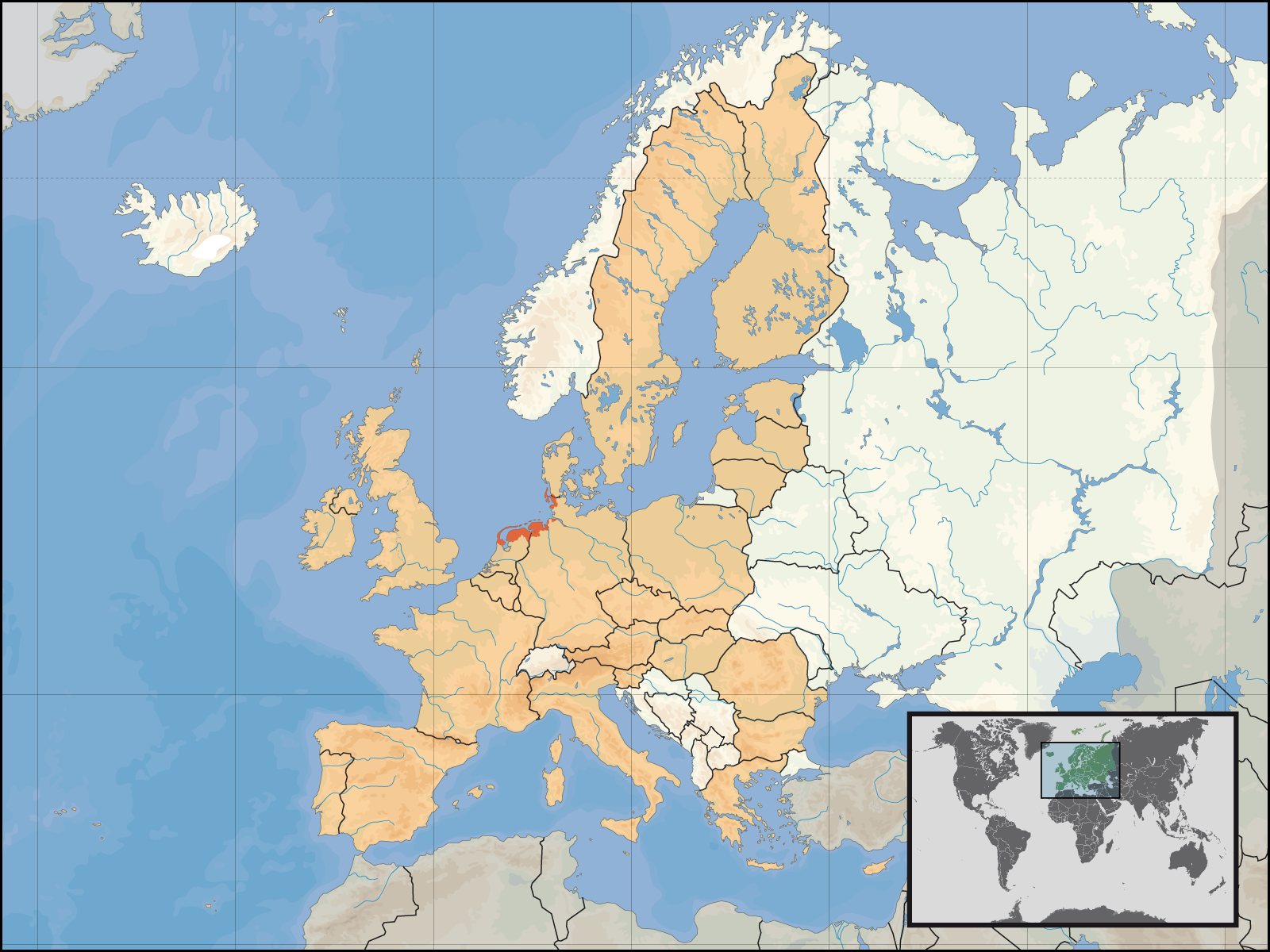
Frisia highlighted on a map of Europe

Frisia

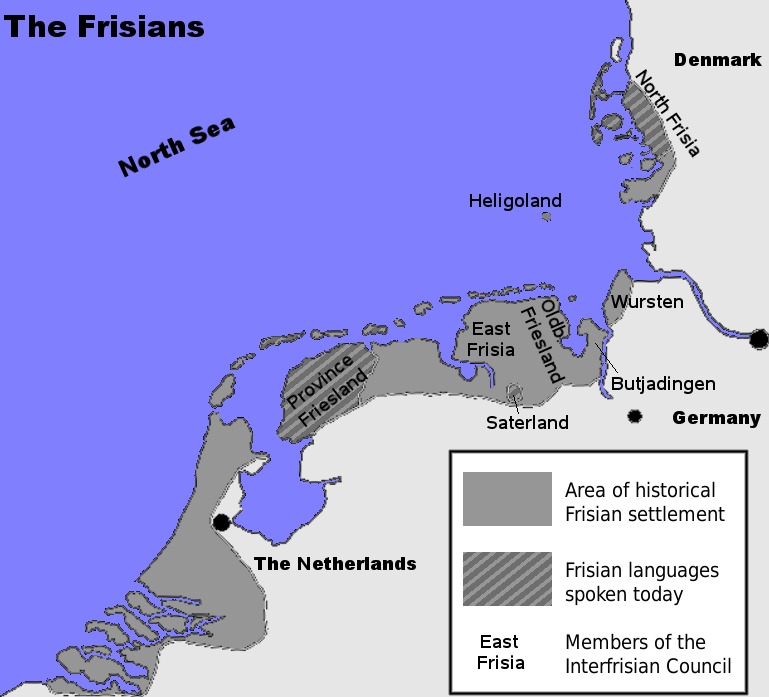
West and East Frisia were once connected. North Frisia was colonized by Frisians via the North Sea and they first settled on Sylt, Amrum and Föhr.

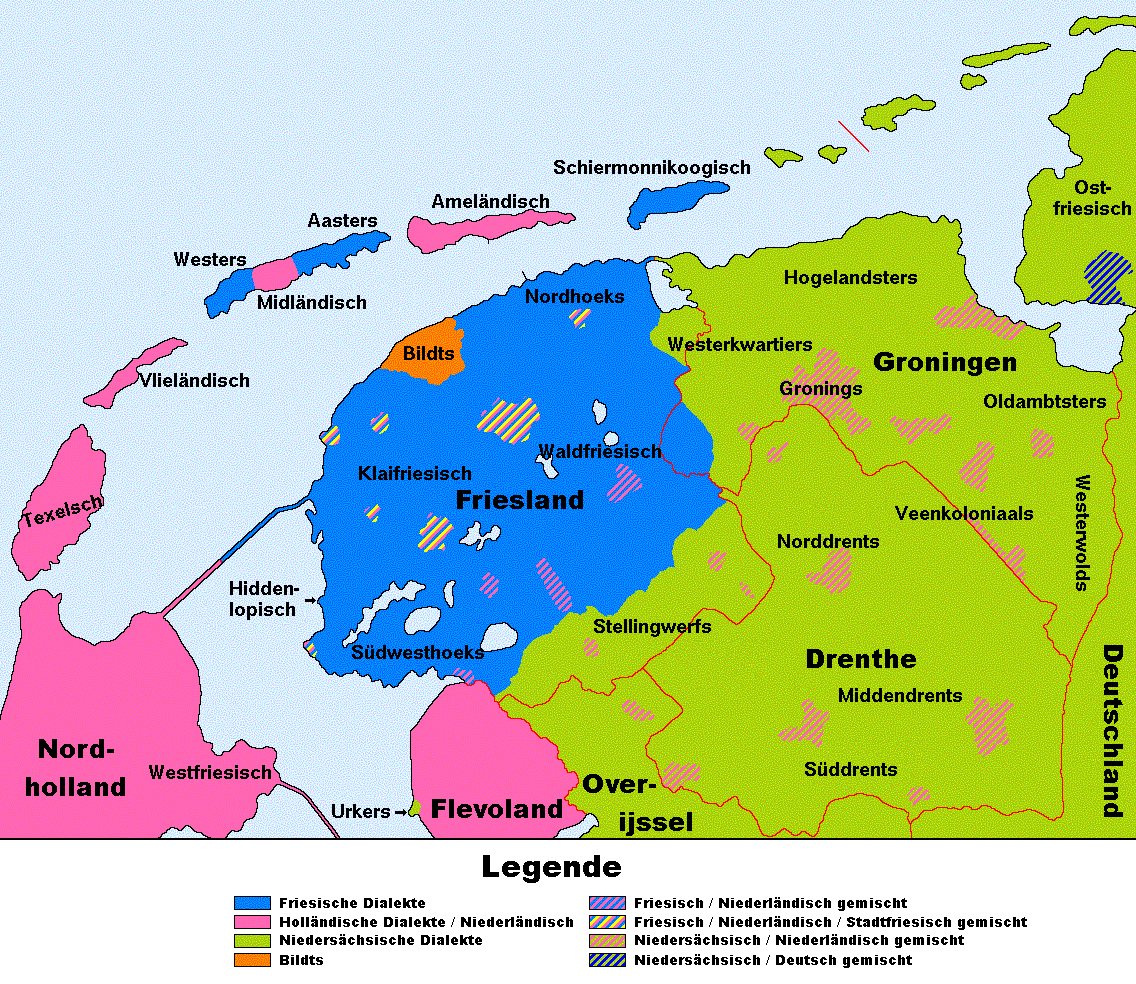
The languages in the northern Netherlands (in German)

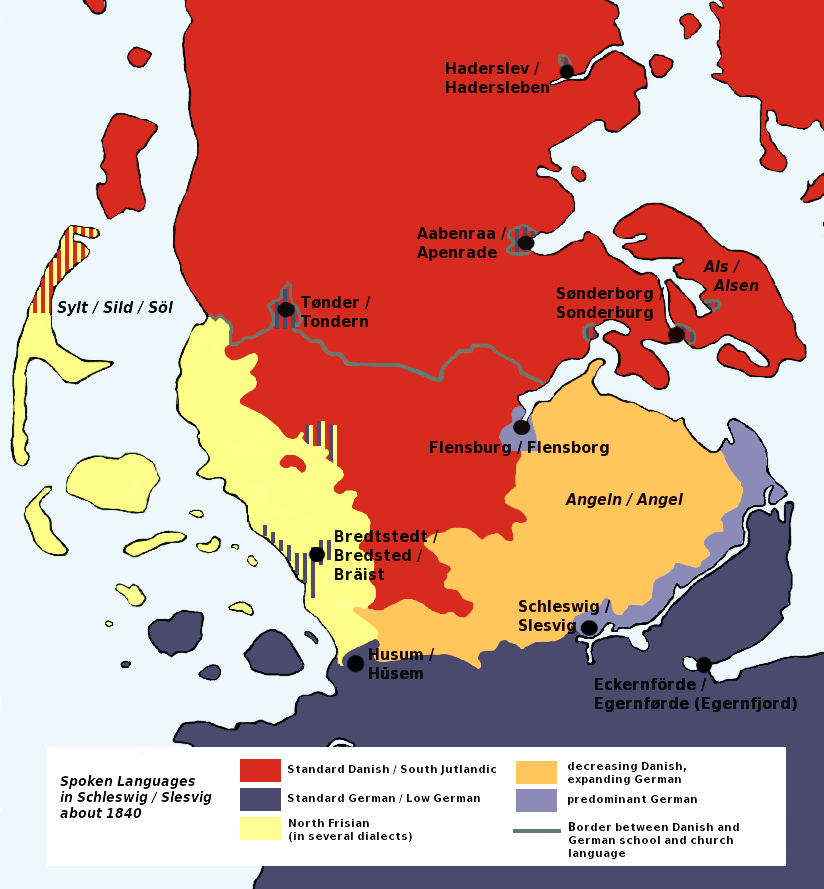
Language situation in northern Schleswig-Holstein as it developed since the 19th century

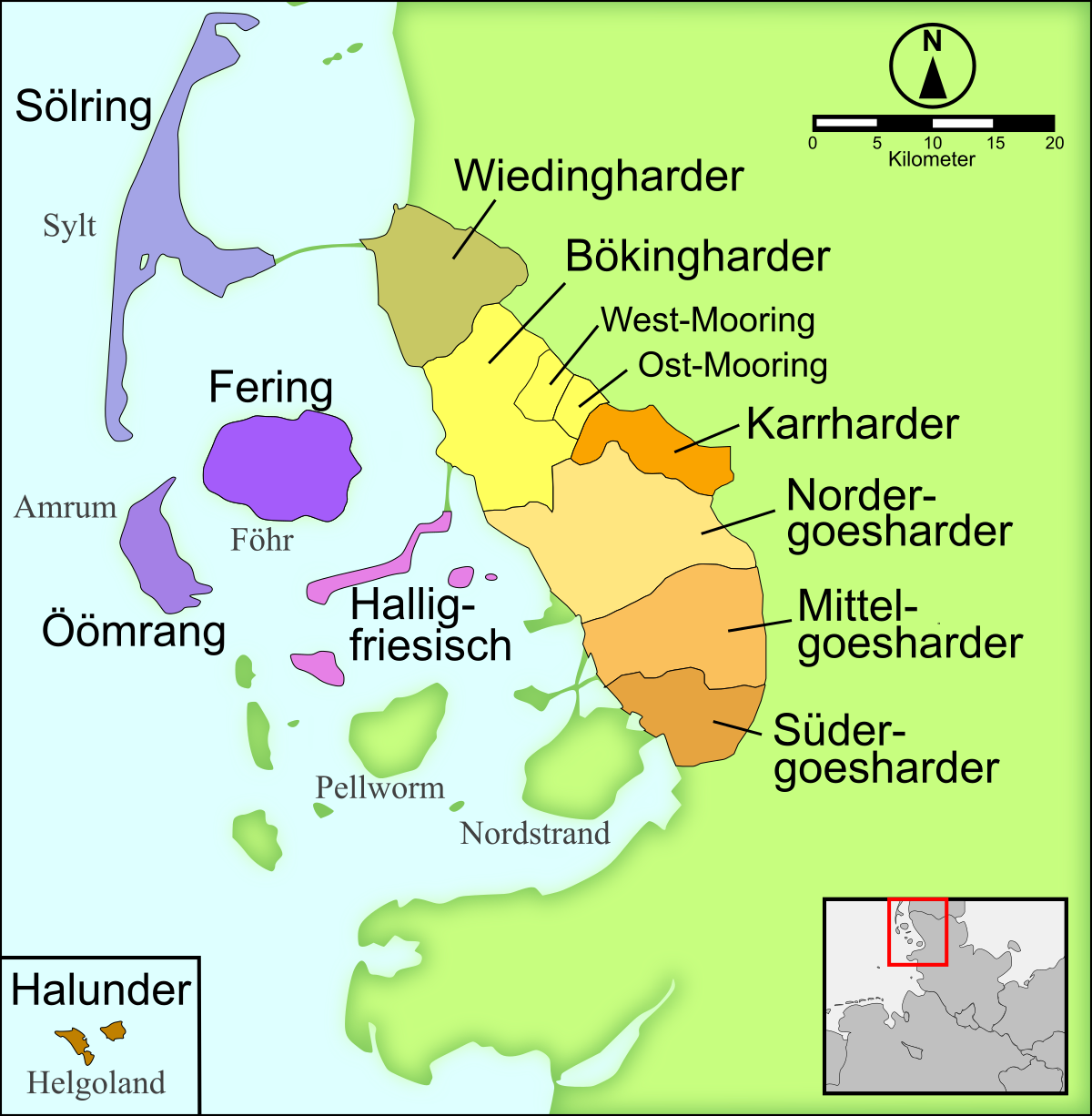
The North Frisian dialects (in German)

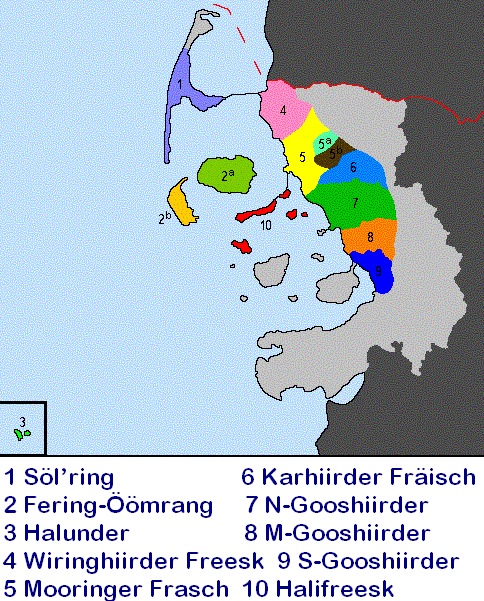
North Frisian map of the North Frisian dialects (1-Sylt, 2a-Föhr, 2b-Amrum)

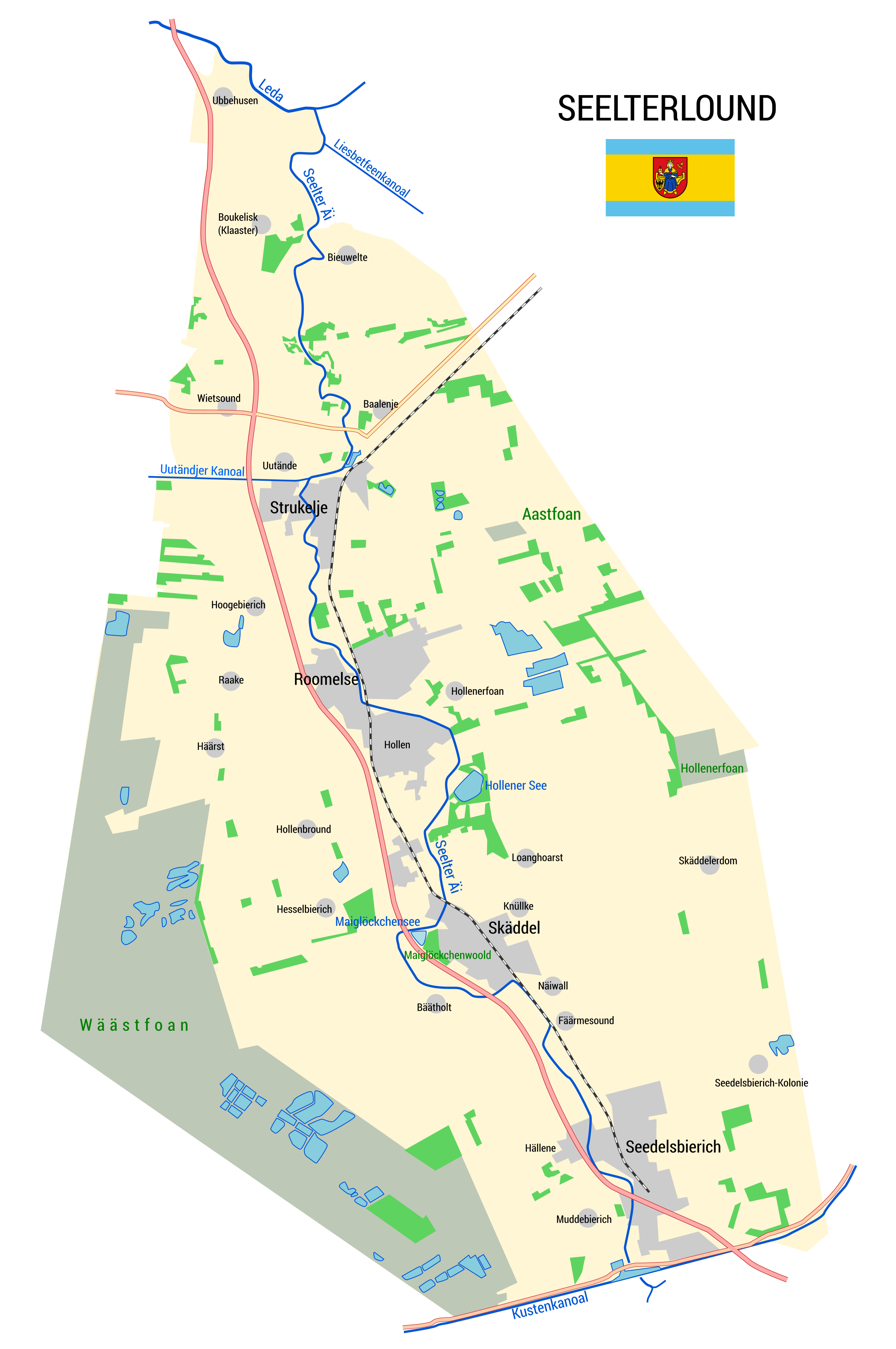
Map of Saterland (in Saterland Frisian)

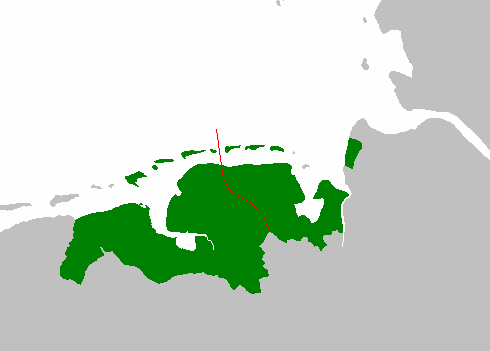
The former East Frisian-speaking area

East Frisia (in German)

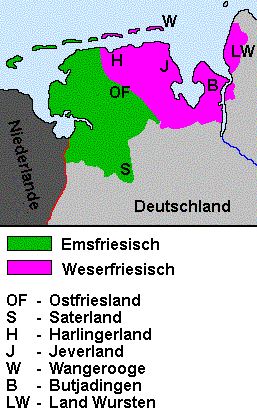
The former East Frisian dialects in Lower Saxony (in German)

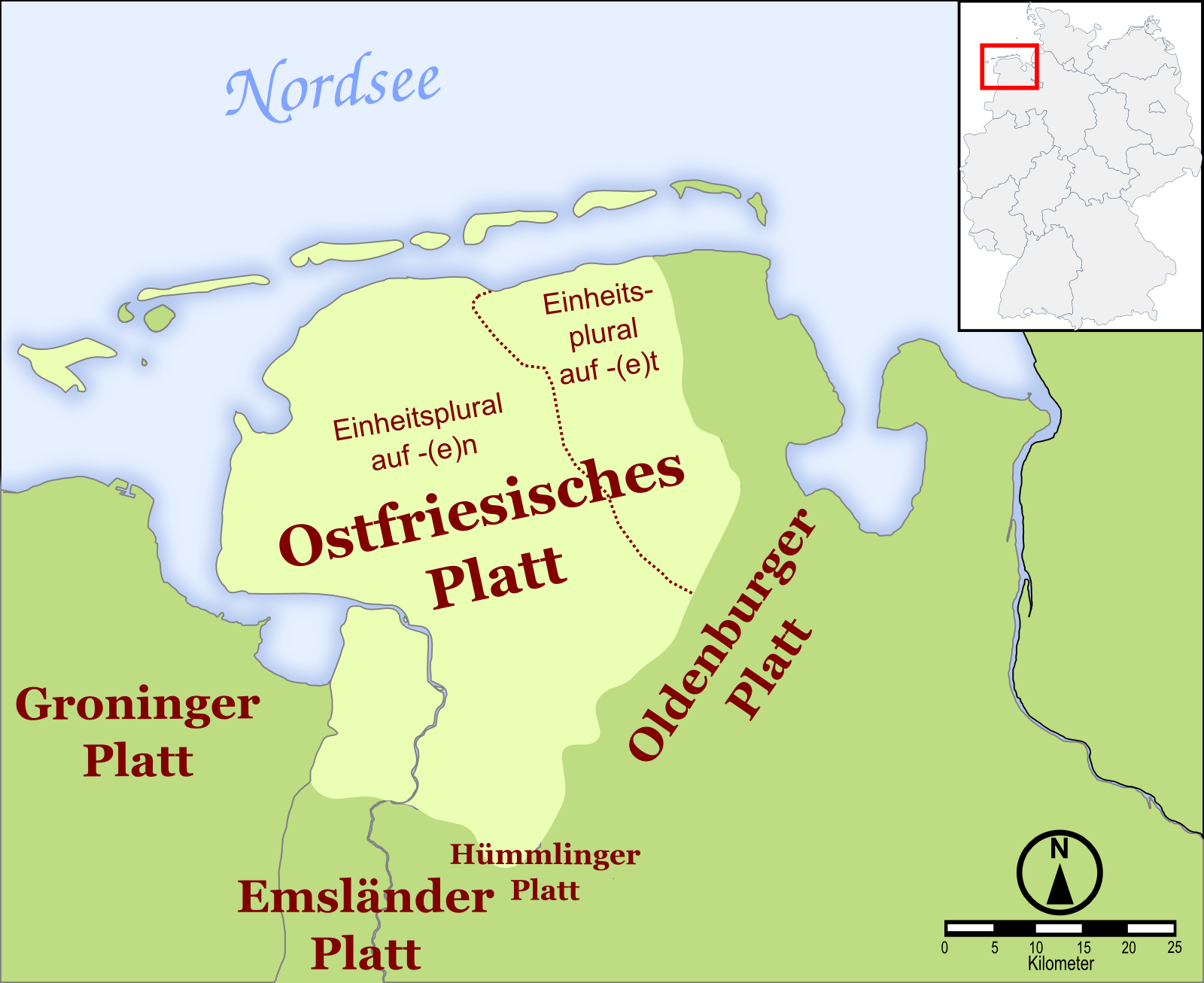
The East Frisian Low Saxon area (colloquially called East Frisian and formed on an East Frisian substratum)

=== Classification ===
Frisian languages belong to the West Germanic branch of the Indo-European languages, the most widespread language family in Europe and the world. Its closest living genealogical relatives are the Anglic languages, i.e. English and Scots (Anglo-Frisian languages); together with the also closely related Low Saxon dialects the two groups make up the group of North Sea Germanic languages.

- Frisian
  - West Frisian, spoken in the Netherlands
    - Hindeloopen Frisian
    - Schiermonnikoogs
    - Westlauwers–Terschelling Frisian
      - Terschellings (Oosterend and West-Terschelling dialects)
      - Western Frisian proper
        - Clay Frisian (Klaaifrysk, incl. Westereendersk)
        - Wood Frisian (Wâldfrysk)
        - South Frisian (Súdhoeks)
  - East Frisian, spoken in Lower Saxony, Germany
    - Ems Frisian dialects
      - Saterland Frisian
      - Emsingoa Frisian (extinct)
      - Brokmerland Frisian (extinct)
      - Ommelanden Frisian (extinct)
    - Weser Frisian dialects
      - Wangerooge Frisian (extinct)
      - Wursten Frisian (extinct)
      - Harlingerland Frisian (extinct)
  - North Frisian, spoken in Schleswig-Holstein, Germany
    - Mainland dialects
      - Bökingharde Frisian
      - Northern Goesharde Frisian
      - Middle Goesharde Frisian
      - Southern Goesharde Frisian (extinct)
      - Wiedingharde Frisian
      - Halligen Frisian
      - Karrharde Frisian
    - Island dialects
      - Söl'ring
      - Fering-Öömrang
      - Heligolandic (Halunder)
    - Extinct dialects
      - Strand Frisian
      - Eiderstedt Frisian
  - Old South Frisian (extinct)

== Speakers ==
Most Frisian speakers live in the Netherlands, primarily in the province of Friesland, which since 1997 officially uses its West Frisian name of Fryslân, where the number of native speakers is about 400,000, which is about 75% of the inhabitants of Friesland. An increasing number of native Dutch speakers in the province are learning Frisian as a second language.

In Germany, there are about 2,000 speakers of Saterland Frisian in the marshy Saterland region of Lower Saxony. Saterland Frisian has resisted encroachment from Low German and Standard German, but Saterland Frisian still remains seriously endangered because of the small size of the speech community and of the lack of institutional support to help preserve and spread the language.

In the North Frisia (Nordfriesland) region of the German state of Schleswig-Holstein, there were 10,000 North Frisian speakers. Although many of these live on the mainland, most are found on the islands, notably Sylt, Föhr, Amrum, and Heligoland. The local corresponding North Frisian dialects are still in use.

West Frisian–Dutch bilinguals are split into two categories: Speakers who had Dutch as their first language tended to maintain the Dutch system of homophony between plural and linking suffixes when speaking West Frisian, by using the West Frisian plural as a linking morpheme. Speakers who had West Frisian as their first language often maintained the West Frisian system of no homophony when speaking West Frisian.

== Status ==
Saterland and North Frisian are officially recognised and protected as minority languages in Germany, and West Frisian is one of the two official languages in the Netherlands, the other being Dutch. ISO 639-1 code fy and ISO 639-2 code fry were assigned to "Frisian", but that was changed in November 2005 to "Western Frisian". According to the ISO 639 Registration Authority the "previous usage of [this] code has been for Western Frisian, although [the] language name was 'Frisian'".

The new ISO 639 code stq is used for the Saterland Frisian language, a variety of Eastern Frisian (not to be confused with East Frisian Low Saxon, a West Low German dialect). The new ISO 639 code frr is used for the North Frisian language variants spoken in parts of Schleswig-Holstein.

The Ried fan de Fryske Beweging is an organization which works for the preservation of the West Frisian language and culture in the Dutch province of Friesland. The Fryske Academy also plays a large role, since its foundation in 1938, to conduct research on Frisian language, history, and society, including attempts at forming a larger dictionary. Recent attempts have allowed Frisian be used somewhat more in some of the domains of education, media and public administration. Nevertheless, Saterland Frisian and most dialects of North Frisian are seriously endangered and West Frisian is considered as vulnerable to being endangered. Moreover, for all advances in integrating Frisian in daily life, there is still a lack of education and media awareness of the Frisian language, perhaps reflecting its rural origins and its lack of prestige. Therefore, in a sociological sense it is considered more a dialect than a standard language, even though linguistically it is a separate language.

For L2 speakers, both the quality and amount of time Frisian is taught in the classroom is low, concluding that Frisian lessons do not contribute meaningfully to the linguistic and cultural development of the students. Moreover, Frisian runs the risk of dissolving into Dutch, especially in Friesland, where both languages are used.

== History ==
=== Old Frisian ===
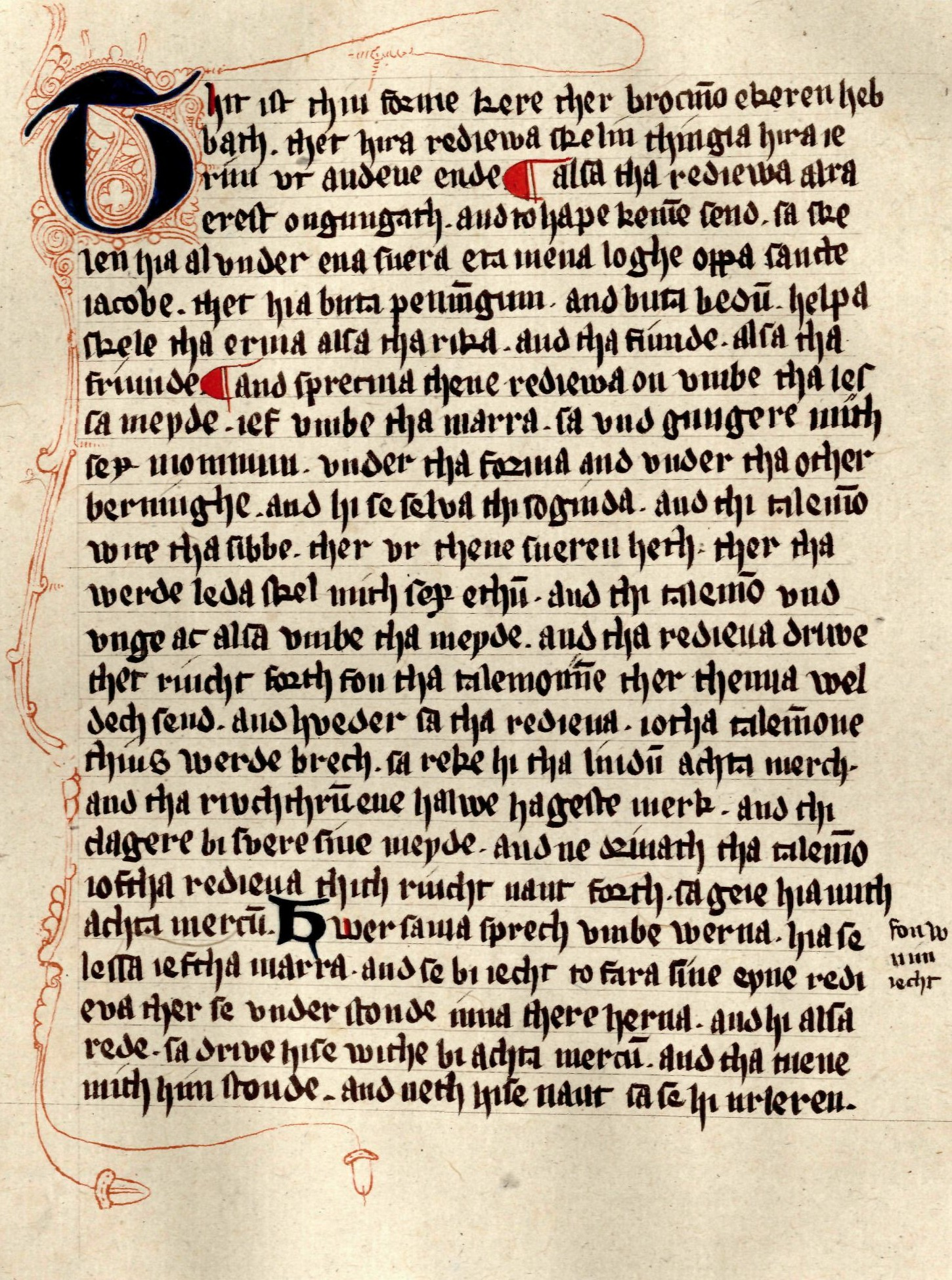
The Brokmerbrief, an Old Frisian text from 1345

In the Early Middle Ages the Frisian lands stretched from the area around Bruges, in what is now Belgium, to the river Weser, in northern Germany. At that time, the Frisian language was spoken along the entire southern North Sea coast. Today this region is sometimes referred to as Great Frisia or Frisia Magna, and many of the areas within it still treasure their Frisian heritage, even though in most places the Frisian languages have been lost.

Frisian is the language most closely related to English and Scots, but after at least five hundred years of being subject to the influence of Dutch, modern Frisian in some aspects bears a greater similarity to Dutch than to English; one must also take into account the centuries-long drift of English away from Frisian. Thus the two languages have become less mutually intelligible over time, partly due to the influence which Dutch and Low German have had on Frisian, and partly due to the vast influence some languages (in particular Norman French) have had on English throughout the centuries.

Old Frisian, however, was very similar to Old English. Historically, both English and Frisian are marked by the loss of the Germanic nasal in words like us (ús; uns in German), soft (sêft; sanft) or goose (goes; Gans): see Anglo-Frisian nasal spirant law. Also, when followed by some vowels, the Germanic k softened to a ch sound; for example, the Frisian for cheese and church is tsiis and tsjerke, whereas in Dutch it is kaas and kerk, and in High German the respective words are Käse and Kirche. Contrarily, this did not happen for chin and choose, which are kin and kieze.

One rhyme demonstrates the palpable similarity between Frisian and English: "Butter, bread and green cheese is good English and good Frisian," which is pronounced more or less the same in both languages (West Frisian: "Bûter, brea en griene tsiis is goed Ingelsk en goed Frysk.")

One major difference between Old Frisian and modern Frisian is that in the Old Frisian period (c. 1150 – c. 1550) grammatical cases still existed. Some of the texts that are preserved from this period are from the 12th or 13th, but most are from the 14th and 15th centuries. Generally, all these texts are restricted to legalistic writings. Although the earliest definite written examples of Frisian are from approximately the 9th century, there are a few examples of runic inscriptions from the region which are probably older and possibly in the Frisian language. These runic writings however usually do not amount to more than single- or few-word inscriptions, and cannot be said to constitute literature as such. The transition from the Old Frisian to the Middle Frisian period (c.1550-c.1820) in the 16th century is based on the fairly abrupt halt in the use of Frisian as a written language.

=== Middle West Frisian ===
Up until the 15th century, Frisian was a language widely spoken and written, but from 1500 onwards it became an almost exclusively oral language, mainly used in rural areas. This was in part due to the occupation of its stronghold, the Dutch province of Friesland (Fryslân), in 1498, by Albert III, Duke of Saxony, who replaced West Frisian as the language of government with Dutch.

Afterwards this practice was continued under the Habsburg rulers of the Netherlands (the German Emperor Charles V and his son, the Spanish King Philip II), and even when the Netherlands became independent, in 1585, West Frisian did not regain its former status. The reason for this was the rise of Holland as the dominant part of the Netherlands, and its language, Dutch, as the dominant language in judicial, administrative and religious affairs.

In this period the great Frisian poet Gysbert Japiks (1603–66), a schoolteacher and cantor from the city of Bolsward, who largely fathered modern West Frisian literature and orthography, was really an exception to the rule.

His example was not followed until the 19th century, when entire generations of West Frisian authors and poets appeared. This coincided with the introduction of the so-called newer breaking system, a prominent grammatical feature in almost all West Frisian dialects, with the notable exception of Southwest Frisian. Therefore, the Modern West Frisian period is considered to have begun at this point in time, around 1820.

=== Modern West Frisian ===
A modern West Frisian speaker, recorded in the Netherlands

The revival of the West Frisian Language was led by the poet Gysbert Japiks, who had begun to write in the language as a way to show that it was possible, and created a collective West Frisian identity and West Frisian standard of writing through his poetry. Later on, Johannes Hilarides would build off Gysbert Japiks' work by building on West Frisian orthography, particularly on its pronunciation; he also, unlike Japiks, set a standard of the West Frisian language that focused more heavily on how the common people used it as an everyday language.

Perhaps the most important figure in the spreading of the West Frisian language was minister Joost. H. Halbertsma (1789–1869), who translated many works into the West Frisian language, such as the New Testament He had however, like Hilarides, focused mostly on the vernacular of the West Frisian language, where he focused on translating texts, plays and songs for the lower and middle classes in order to teach and expand the West Frisian language. The compiled literary work of the Halbertsma brothers (Joost, Tjalling, and Eeltje), Rimen en Teltsjes, is regarded as the standard Frisian literary work. This had begun the effort to continuously preserve the West Frisian language, which continues unto this day. It was however not until the first half of the 20th century that the West Frisian revival movement began to gain strength, not only through its language, but also through its culture and history, supporting singing and acting in West Frisian in order to facilitate West Frisian speaking.

It was not until 1960 that Dutch began to dominate West Frisian in Friesland; with many non-Frisian immigrants into Friesland, the language gradually began to diminish, and survives now only due to the constant effort of scholars and organisations. In recent years, it has been the province of Friesland, rather than the language itself, that has become a more important part of the West Frisian identity; as such, the language has become less important for cultural preservation purposes. It is especially written West Frisian that seems to have trouble surviving, with only 30% of the West Frisian population competent in it; it went out of use in the 16th century and continues to be barely taught today.

Frisian-language signs

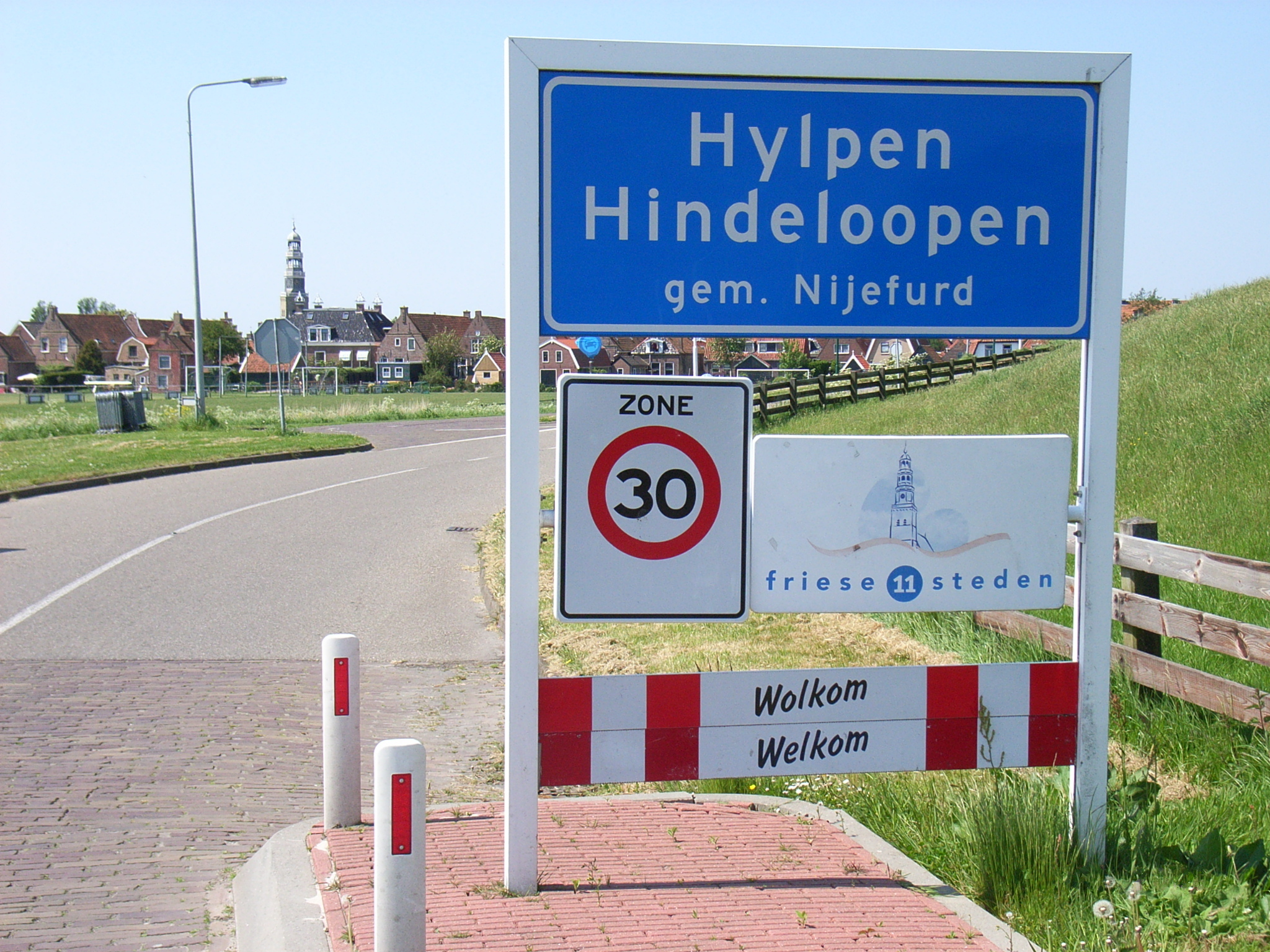
Bilingual signs Hindeloopen in Friesland (Netherlands) with the West Frisian name above and the Dutch below

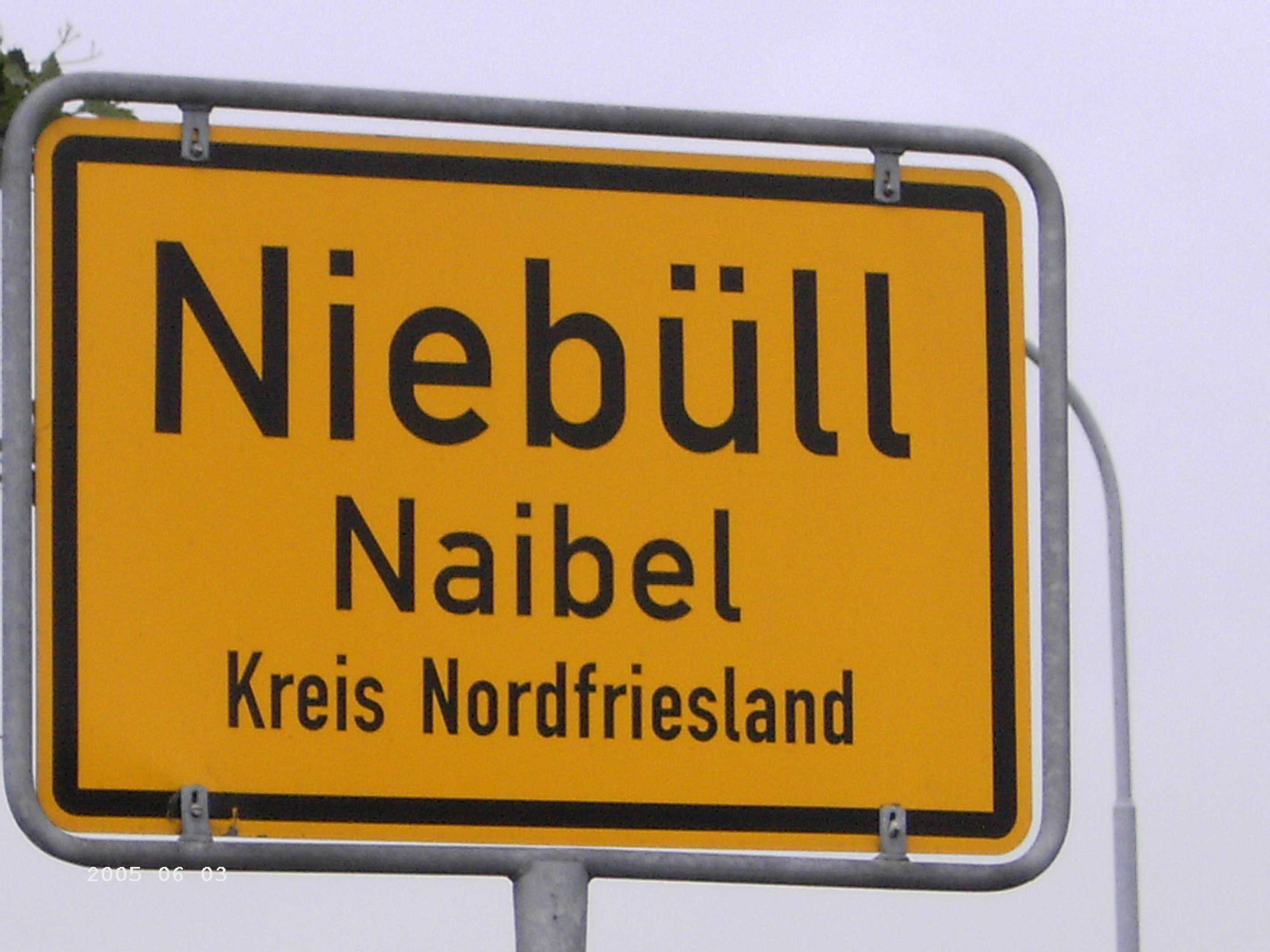
Bilingual sign in Niebüll in North Frisia (Germany) with the German name above and the North Frisian name below

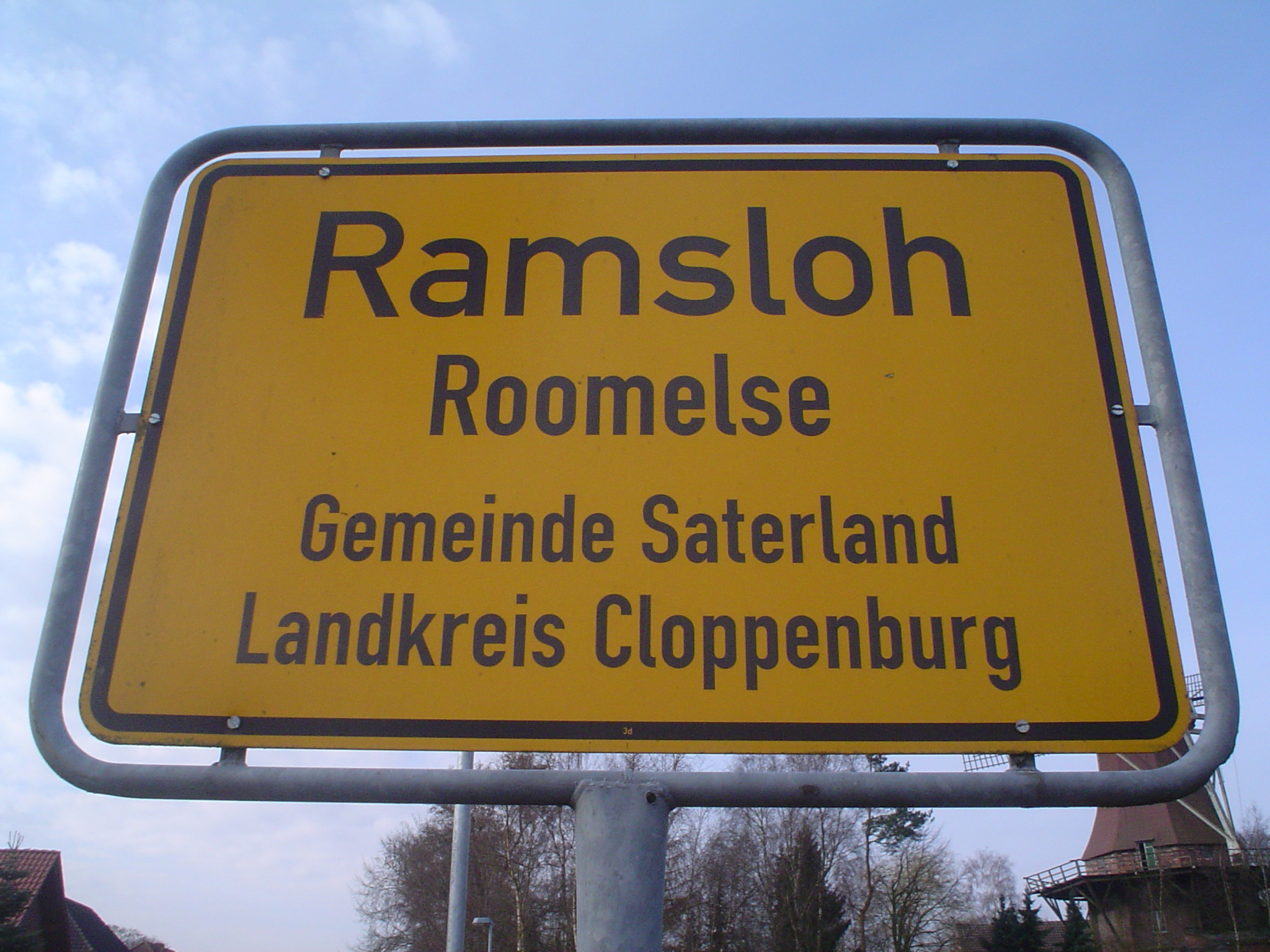
Bilingual sign in Ramsloh, Saterland (Germany) with the German name above and the East Frisian name below

== Sample texts ==
=== The Lord's Prayer ===
The Lord's Prayer in Standard West Frisian (Frysk) from the Third Edition of the Frisian Bible *	The English translation in the 1662 Book of Common Prayer **	The Standard Dutch translation from the Dutch Bible Society	High German translation after Martin Luther
Us Heit, dy't yn de himelen is	Our Father, which art in Heaven	Onze Vader die in de hemelen zijt,	Vater unser, der Du bist im Himmel,
jins namme wurde hillige.	Hallowed be thy Name.	Uw naam worde geheiligd;	Dein Name werde geheiligt,
Jins keninkryk komme.	Thy Kingdom come.	Uw Koninkrijk kome;	Dein Reich komme,
Jins wollen barre,	Thy will be done,	Uw wil geschiede,	Dein Wille geschehe,
allyk yn 'e himel sa ek op ierde.	in earth as it is in Heaven.	gelijk in de hemel alzo ook op de aarde.	wie im Himmel, so auf Erden.
Jou ús hjoed ús deistich brea.	Give us this day our daily bread.	Geef ons heden ons dagelijks brood;	Unser täglich Brot gib uns heute,
En ferjou ús ús skulden,	And forgive us our trespasses,	en vergeef ons onze schulden,	und vergib uns unsere Schuld,
allyk ek wy ferjouwe ús skuldners.	As we forgive them that trespass against us.	gelijk ook wij vergeven onze schuldenaren;	wie auch wir vergeben unsern Schuldigern.
En lied ús net yn fersiking,	And lead us not into temptation;	en leid ons niet in verzoeking,	Und führe uns nicht in Versuchung,
mar ferlos ús fan 'e kweade.	But deliver us from evil.	maar verlos ons van de boze.	sondern erlöse uns von dem Übel,
Want Jowes is it keninkryk en de krêft en de hearlikheid oant yn ivichheid. "Amen"	For thine is the kingdom, the power, and the glory, For ever and ever. Amen.	Want van U is het Koninkrijk en de kracht en de heerlijkheid in der eeuwigheid. Amen.	denn Dein ist die Kraft und die Herrlichkeit in Ewigkeit. Amen

NB:
* See also West Frisian language#Sample text.
** Which was changed to "who", in earth to "on earth," and them that to "those who" in the 1928 version of the Church of England prayer book and used in other later Anglican prayer books too. The words given here are those of the 1662 book.

=== Comparative Germanic sentences ===
- English: The boy stroked the girl about the chin and kissed her on the cheeks.
- Saterland Frisian: Die Wänt strookede dät Wucht uum ju Keeuwe un oapede hier ap do Sooken.
- North Frisian (Mooring dialect): Di dreng aide dåt foomen am dåt kan än mäket har aw da siike.
- North Frisian (Söl'ring dialect): Di Dreeng strekt dit faamen om't Ken en taatjet höör üp di Sjaken
- West Frisian: De jonge streake it famke om it kin en tute har op 'e wangen.
- Gronings: t Jong fleerde t wicht om kinne tou en smokte heur op wange.
- East Frisian Low Saxon: De Fent straktde dat Wicht um't Kinn to un tuutjede hör up de Wangen.
- German: Der Junge streichelte das Mädchen ums Kinn und küsste sie auf die Wangen.
- Dutch: De jongen streelde het meisje langs haar kin en kuste haar op de wangen.
- Afrikaans: Die seun streel die meisie oor haar ken en soen haar op die wange.
- Danish: Drengen strøg pigen på hagen og kyssede hende på kinderne.
- Icelandic: Drengurinn strauk stúlkunni um hökuna og kyssti hana á kinnarnar.
- Norwegian (Bokmål): Gutten strøk jenta på haken og kysset henne på kinnene.
- Norwegian (Nynorsk): Guten strauk jenta på haka og kyssa henne på kinna.
- Swedish: Pojken strök flickan över hakan och kysste henne på kinderna.

NB: These are not always literal translations of each other.

== See also ==
- East Frisian Low Saxon
- Frisia
- Frisian Islands
- Frisians
- Imperativus pro infinitivo
