= Hindeloopen Frisian =

West Frisian language of Friesland, Netherlands

- Hindeloopen–Molkwerum Frisian
- Hielepes, Hielpes or Hylpers
- Native to: Netherlands
- Ethnicity: Frisians
- Language family: Indo-European: Germanic; West Germanic; North Sea Germanic; Anglo-Frisian; Frisian; West Frisian; Hindeloopen Frisian

Language codes
- ISO 639-3: None (mis)
- Glottolog: hind1273
- Hindeloopen Frisian is classified as Critically Endangered by the UNESCO Atlas of the World's Languages in Danger.

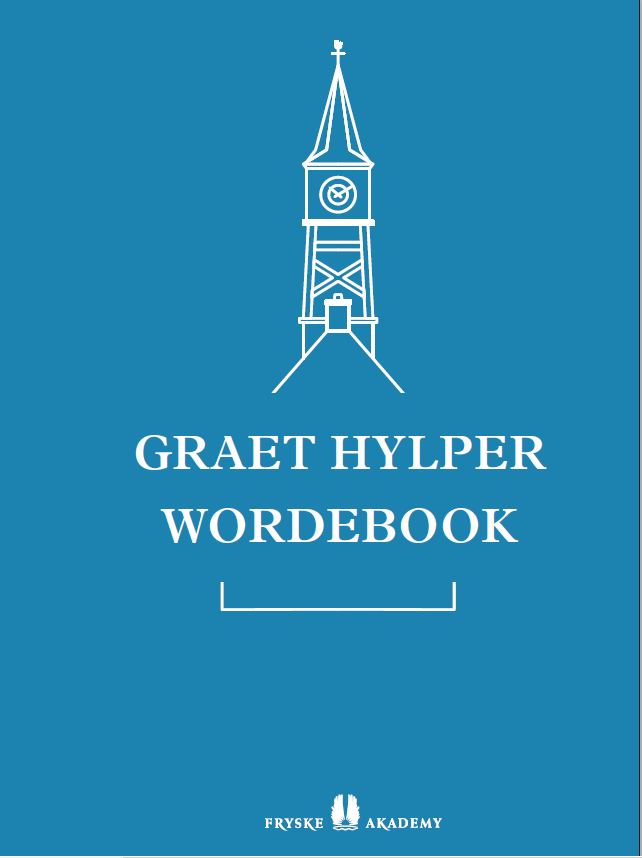
Cover of the 2019 Hindeloopen Frisian Dictionary

Hindeloopen Frisian (natively Hielepes [ˈhiləpəs], Hielpes [ˈhilpəs] or Hylpers [ˈhilpr̩s], West Frisian: Hylpersk [ˈhilpr̩s], also referred to as Hindeloopers (Dutch: [ˈɦɪndəˌloːpərs]) in English and Dutch) is an endangered West Frisian language spoken in the port town of Hindeloopen and the village of Molkwerum on the west coast of Friesland. It has preserved much of the Old Frisian phonology and lexicon, and has been attested since the 17th century. Hindeloopen Frisian is spoken by some 500 people in Hindeloopen, almost all of them elderly, with the number of speakers decreasing.

== Recognition ==
In 1981, the Fryske Akademy (Frisian Academy) published a dictionary of the language (then seen as a dialect) entitled Hylper Wurdboek. In 2006, work began on a successor to the dictionary, which was published in 2019 under the name Graet Hylper Wordebook. Authors of the new edition included Gosse Blom and Siebren Dyk. The new dictionary contains 1000 pages of words, grammar and synonyms and is considered the definitive version of the language.

In 2019, Glottolog assigned the language the code "hind1273", under the name "Hindeloopen-Molkwerum Frisian". Dyami Millarson, responsible for the Glottolog entries of both Hinderloopers and Terschelling Frisian stated that "these 3 languages have a complete language system, it's not just a few words which are different from Frisian, the languages have developed separately from Frisian. Hindeloopen Frisian and Standard West Frisian are more different from each other than Afrikaans and Dutch" in an interview with Trouw regarding the language.

The Hindeloopen Frisian language is taught at the local elementary school.

== Development ==
Due to its position on a peninsula, Hindeloopen was very isolated from the mainland until the 20th century and for centuries had more contact with the coastal cities in Holland on the other side of the South Sea. Because of this, Hindeloopen Frisian underwent greater influence from Hollandic speech than the other West Frisian languages and dialects. The location of Hindeloopen is, however, not a complete explanation for the language: until about 1800, Koudum had a dialect that was very similar to Hindeloopen Frisian.

== Differences compared to Standard West Frisian ==
- In Hindeloopen Frisian, the l in the trigraphs âld and âlt is pronounced, as in Standard West Frisian, and is subject to vowel lengthening.
- The Standard West Frisian tsj is reduced to tj or s; for example, tjian for the standard tsjin (against) and serke for the standard tsjerke (church).
- The digraph ae is still used instead of the modern aa.
- The standard ú is written uu.
- Non-standard letters used: ä, ö, è and ò.

There are also a few lexical differences, such as siie instead of naaie (to sew), tät instead of happe (a child’s word for “horse”) and öie instead of sipel (onion). The vocabulary of the language preserves many more words from Old Frisian that are no longer used elsewhere. The differences in pronunciation and vocabulary between Hindeloopen Frisian and Standard West Frisian are so big that mutual intelligibility is difficult. However, Hindeloopen Frisian has gradually become more like standard West Frisian due to increasing contact with speakers of other dialects.

== Example ==
The Fisherman and His Wife
Western Frisian translation (Anne Tjerk Popkema)	Hindeloopers translation (Gosse Blom)
Op in dei siet er sa wer ris mei de angel yn 'e hân yn it heldere wetter te stoarjen. Hy siet mar en hy siet mar. Doe bûgde de angel hiel djip troch. Doe't er ophelle, kaam der in grutte fisk út it wetter, in bot. De bot sei tsjin him: "Hark ris, fisker, ik freegje dy om my libje te litten. Eins bin ik net in bot, mar in betsjoende prins. Wat hast deroan ast my deamakkest? Ik smeitsje dochs net. Set my mar wer út yn 't wetter en lit my swimme."	Op in dei seet er só wur ris te fiskjen, en sooch er geduerich yn it heldere wetter. Hy seet mar en hy seet mar. Dê geeng de dobber nei ûnderen, de dêpte yn, en dê't er ophelle, hee er in helen graeten bót oen 'e hook. De bót see tjian him: "Hear ris, fisker, yk smeak jy, leet my libjen bliuwe. Eigenlik bin yk gin bót, mar in betjoenden preans. Het hest deroen ast my daamekkest? Yk smeikje dochs naat. Sot my weróm yn it wetter en leet my swemme."
