= West Frisian languages =

Group of languages of the Netherlands

West Frisian
- Geographic distribution: Friesland and Groningen, Netherlands
- Ethnicity: West Frisians
- Linguistic classification: Indo-European: Germanic; West Germanic; North Sea Germanic; Anglo-Frisian; Frisian; West Frisian
- Subdivisions: Hindeloopen Frisian; Schiermonnikoog Frisian; Westlauwers–Terschellings • Terschelling Frisian • West Lauwers Frisian; (Stadsfries Dutch)

Language codes
- ISO 639-1: fy
- ISO 639-2 / 5: fry
- ISO 639-3: fry
- Glottolog: mode1264
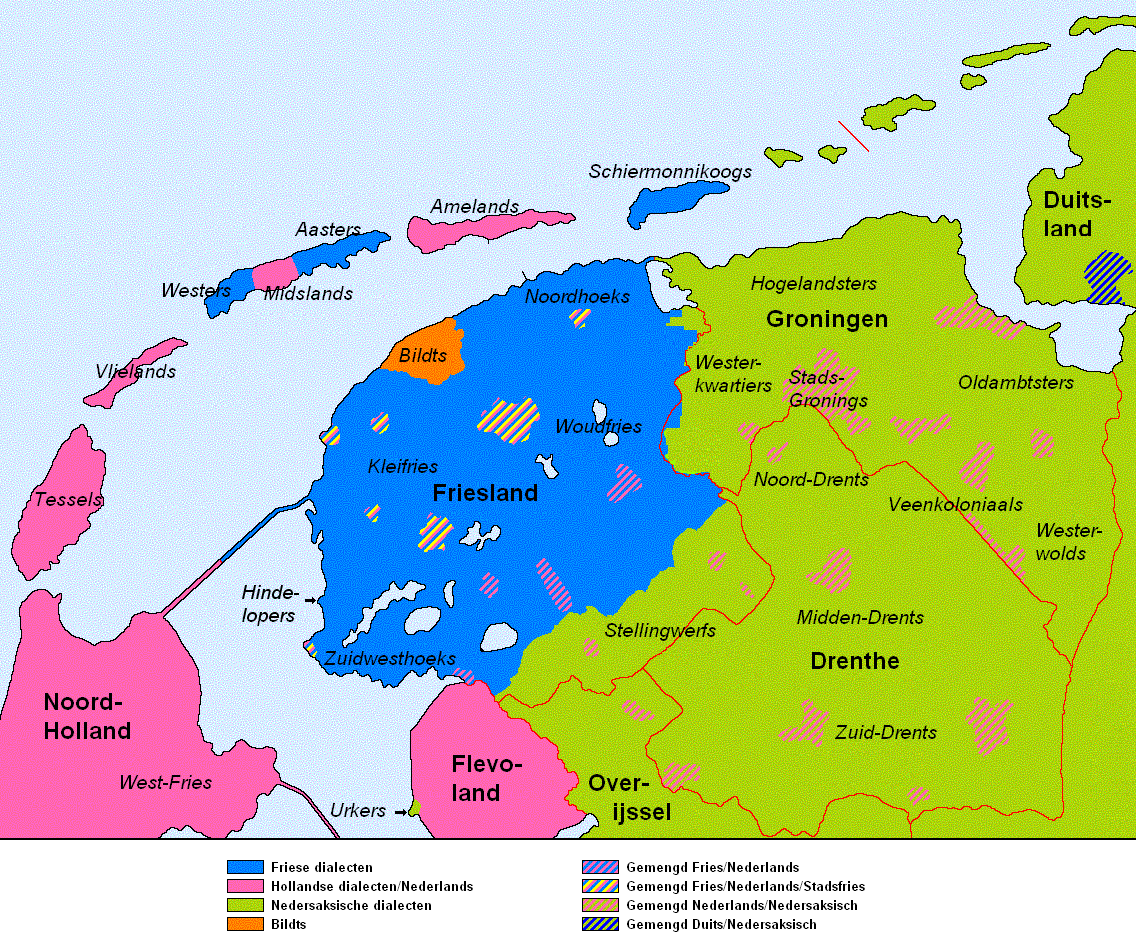
- Present-day distribution of West Frisian languages (blue), in the Netherlands
- Notes: fry is ISO 639-2 and not ISO 639-5

The West Frisian languages are a group of closely related, though not mutually intelligible, Frisian languages of the Netherlands. Due to the marginalization of all but mainland West Frisian, they are often portrayed as dialects of a single language. (See that article for the history of the languages.)

== Languages ==
Not all West Frisian varieties spoken in Dutch Friesland are mutually intelligible. The varieties on the islands are rather divergent, and Glottolog distinguishes four languages:

- Hindeloopen Frisian (Hylpersk, Dutch Hindeloopers and Molkwerums), an archaic dialect of the peninsular harbour town of Hindeloopen (Hylpen) and the village of Molkwerum on the west coast, is spoken by, at the most, some 300 people.
- Schiermonnikoog Frisian Skiermûntseagersk, the most endangered West Frisian language, is spoken on the island of Schiermonnikoog (Skiermûntseach) by no more than 50–100 people (out of an island population of 900).
- Westlauwers–Terschellings
  - Terschelling Frisian (Skylgersk). Westersk and Aastersk are the dialects of the western and eastern parts of the island of Terschelling (Skylge) and have about 800 and 400 speakers respectively.
  - Western Frisian, spoken by over 99% of the West Frisian-speaking population
