= Schiermonnikoog Frisian =

West Frisian dialect

Schiermonnikoogs
- Skiermûntseagersk
- Native to: Netherlands
- Ethnicity: Frisians
- Native speakers: 50–100
- Language family: Indo-European: Germanic; West Germanic; North Sea Germanic; Anglo-Frisian; Frisian; West Frisian; Schiermonnikoogs

Language codes
- ISO 639-3: None (mis)
- Glottolog: schi1234
- Schiermonnikoog Frisian is classified as Critically Endangered by the UNESCO Atlas of the World's Languages in Danger.

Schiermonnikoog Frisian (autoglotonym Schiermonnikeigers or Schiermonnikoogs, West Frisian: Skiermûntseagersk [ˌskiəmuːnˈtsɪəɣr̩s], Dutch: Schiermonnikoogs [ˌsxiːrmɔnəkˈoːxs]) is the most endangered of the West Frisian languages, spoken by no more than 50 to 100 people (out of an island population of 900 people) on the island of Schiermonnikoog (Skiermûntseach).

== Overview ==
Although this dialect belongs linguistically to West Frisian, it deviates from it to such an extent that it is poorly understood by Frisians from the mainland. Schiermonnikoog is east of the Lauwersmeer. There, before 1500, was the border between West Frisian and Ost Frisian. Consequently, the dialect of Schiermonnikoog has an Eastern-influenced vocabulary. This has led some early researchers to classify this dialect with the Gronings (however, nowadays Gronings shows more Lower Saxon characteristics than Frisian). Another distinctive difference from other Frisian dialects is the lack of diminutives, unlike mainland Frisian.

Due to labor immigration and tourism, the Schiermonnikoog dialect has been in sharp decline since World War II. Many residents come from the mainland and therefore speak another Frisian dialect or Gronings. Presumably there is a considerable group of people who speak Frisian with Schiermonnikoog influences, but no longer adhere to the gender rules, for example.

== Written literature ==
In recent years, Fryske Akademy has been promoting the study of this dialect as much as possible and building up a device in which the words from all Schiermonnikoger texts are recorded; it also encourages writing in dialect. In 1960, with the support of the Akademy, a collection of verses Herfsttridden ("Autumn Threads") by L. Wiersma appeared, printed at A.J. Osinga in Bolsward.

== Sample text ==
Here is a sample text of Schiermonnikoog Frisian, a fragment from the foreword (feurwes) of the Eilander Wezzenbúek, by Willem Visser and Siebren Dyk:

De tòstand fan it Eilanders is yn de gúed dôtich jier nooi it ferschiinen fan de Wezzenlist net echt eeuwrs wezzen. Wy heupe, krekt as Fokkema mooi syn Spraakkunst en Wezzenlist, mooi dit wezzenbúek mooi tò werkjen oon de ferstarking fan de posytsje fan en de waardering feur it Eilanders. Tògelyk wette wy maar al tò gúed, dat it (fut)bestain kinnen fan in taal yn it aiste plak bepaald wedt troch in geheel fan sosjale, ekonomyse, kulturele en psychologyse faktoren en dat de rol fan in wezzenbúek der net got yn wazze kin. Fansalm hewwe wy mooi dit wezzenbúek aik in mair wytenschaplik dúel feur aigen: it Eilanders, ne't it nach kin, nach in keer gúed fastleze en dertroch tògonklik metje feur taalkundich eeuwndersiek (yn 'e rúmste sin fan it wes). Derom binne útstorven, ferauderde en seldsume wezzen, búgings- en ferfúegingsformen en faste ferbiiningen aik opnimd en binne der soms freewat útfúerige tòlichtingen by bepaalde wezzen af betjottingen jeeuwn.
