= Terschelling Frisian =

West Frisian dialect of Terschelling, Netherlands

Terschellings
- Skylgersk
- Native to: Netherlands
- Ethnicity: Frisians
- Native speakers: (undated figure of 1,200)
- Language family: Indo-European: Germanic; West Germanic; North Sea Germanic; Anglo-Frisian; Frisian; West Frisian; Westlauwers–Terschellings; Terschellings

Language codes
- ISO 639-3: None (mis)
- Glottolog: ters1236
- Terschelling Frisian is classified as Critically Endangered by the UNESCO Atlas of the World's Languages in Danger.

Terschelling Frisian, or Skylgersk, is a West Frisian language spoken on the island of Terschelling (Skylge) in the Netherlands. In the central stretch of the island a dialect of Dutch (Midslands) is spoken, but on the western and eastern ends of the island are spoken two Frisian dialects, known simply as Westersk ('Western') and Aastersk ('Eastern'), by about 800 and 400 people, respectively.
