= Hindeloopen =

Hindeloopen Hylpen
- City
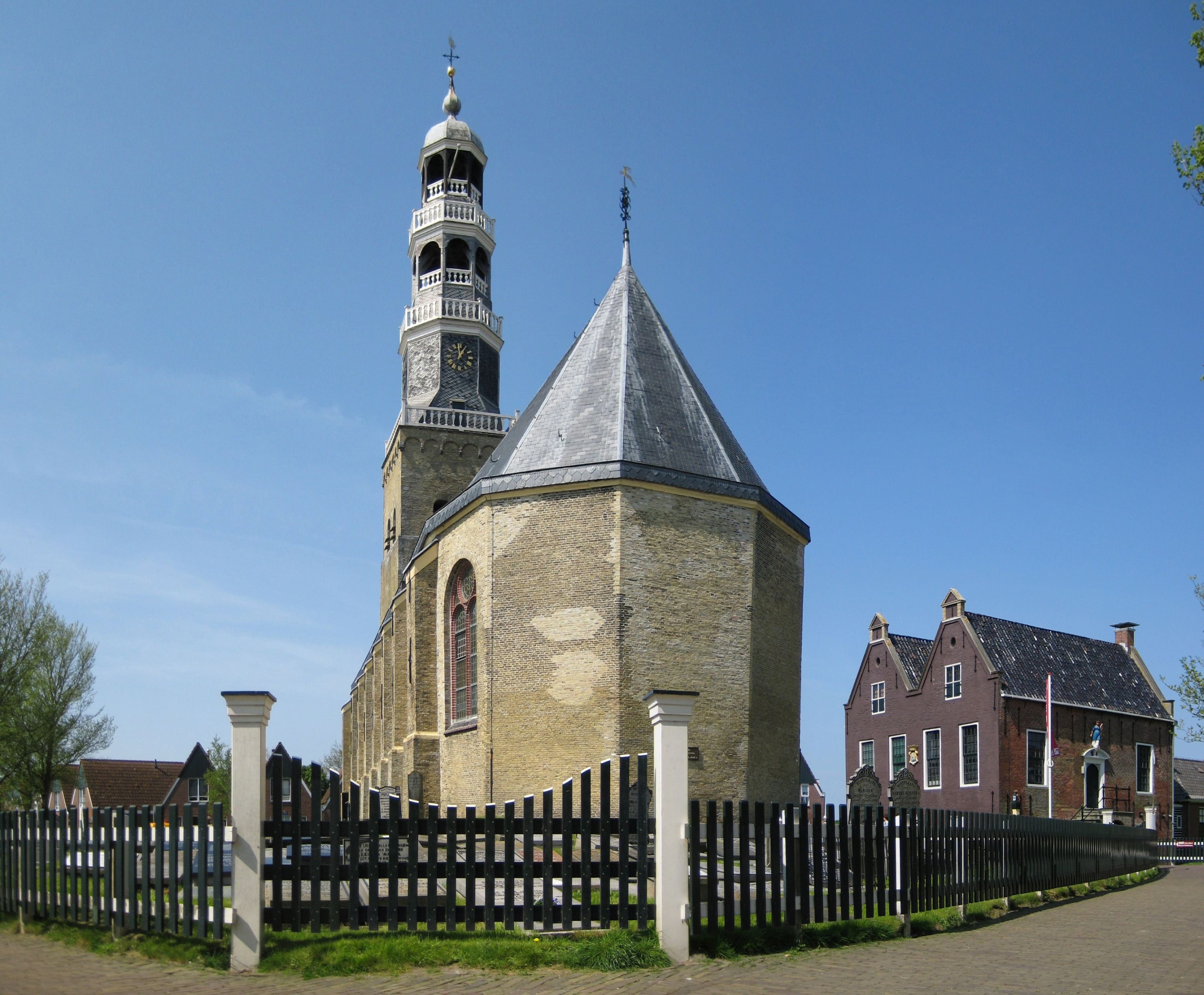
- Church and museum in Hindeloopen

- Flag Coat of arms

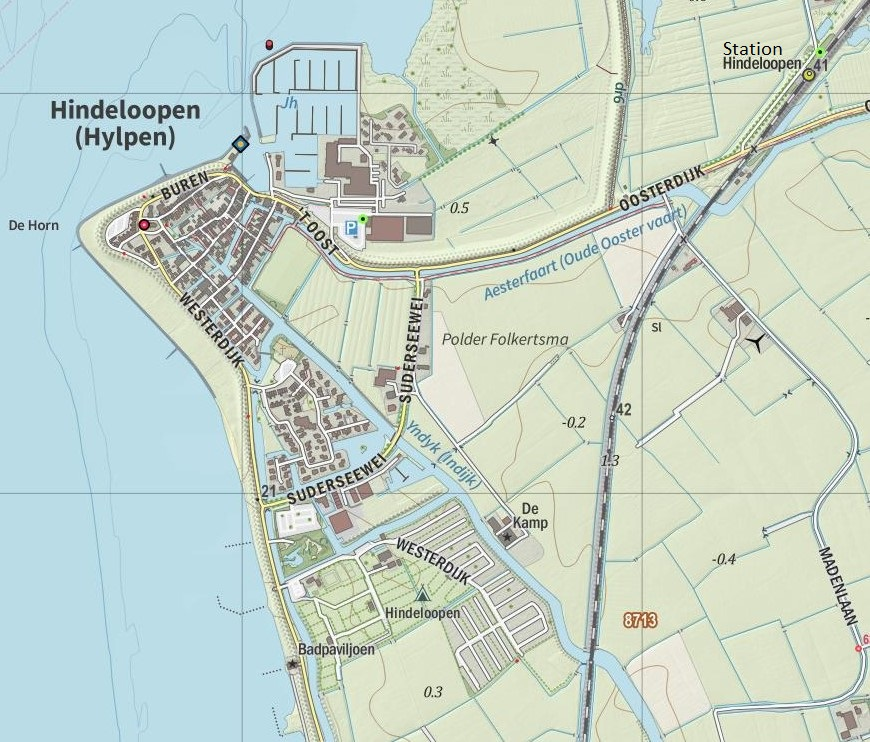
- Map of Hindeloopen (2019)

- Location in the Netherlands Hindeloopen (Netherlands)
- Country: Netherlands
- Province: Friesland
- Municipality: Súdwest-Fryslân

Population (2017)
  - Total: 875
- Time zone: UTC+1 (CET)
  - Summer (DST): UTC+2 (CEST)
- Postal code: 8713
- Telephone area: 0514
- Website: Official

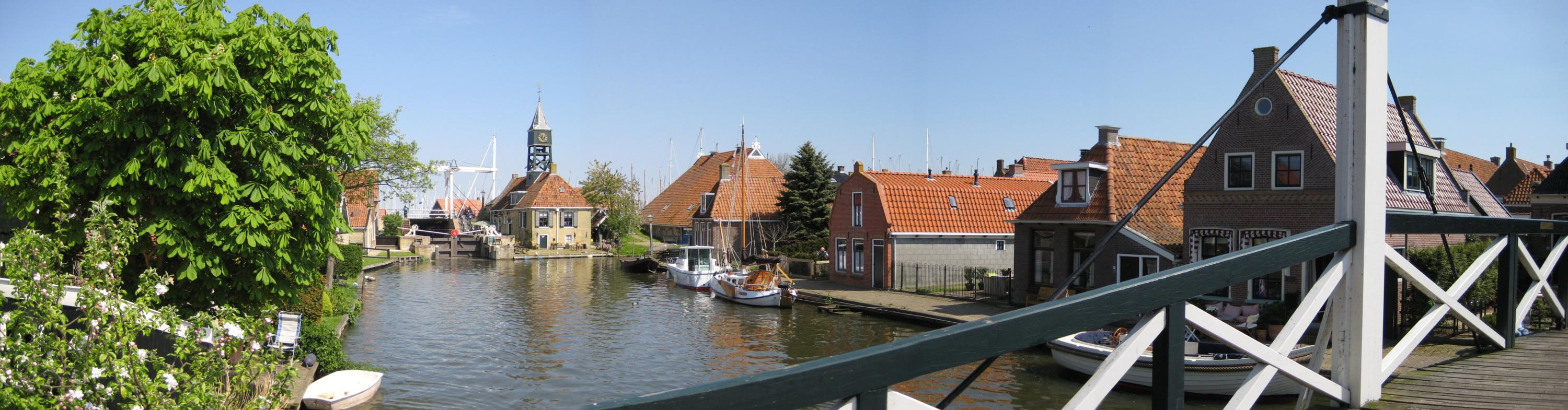
The Sylroede, the main channel in Hindeloopen (2008)

Hindeloopen (Dutch pronunciation: [ˈɦɪndəˌloːpə(n)]; West Frisian: Hylpen [ˈhilpm̩]; Hindeloopen Frisian: Hielpen [ˈhiəlpm̩]) is an old city on the North of the Netherlands on the IJsselmeer. It lies within the municipality of Súdwest Fryslân. It is famous because of the Hindeloopen art and hindeloopen costume.

Hindeloopen is one of the eleven cities of Friesland. It had a population of around 875 in January 2017.

== History ==
Hindeloopen received city rights in 1225 and in 1368 it became a member of the Hanseatic League. Since the 12th and 13th century, shippers of Hindeloopen undertook journeys to the North and Baltic Sea Coasts. The strong overseas connections with foreign countries and infrequent contact with the hinterland were probably the reasons for the developing of the Hindeloopen language; a mixture of West Frisian, English, Danish, and Norwegian.

The shipping trade brought the population of Hindeloopen a great prosperity. The 17th and 18th century were especially golden times. At that time, the people of Hindeloopen spent a lot of money in Amsterdam on precious fabrics and objects, which were supplied through the Dutch East India Company (VOC). The rich town developed in those days her own costume and a completely individual style with colorful painted walls and furniture.

In the small streets some sea captains’ houses remind of this time of glory. You can see an anchor hanging on the façades of these houses, in those years a sign, that the captain could still accept freight. In summertime when the captain was at sea, the captain's wife lived with the children in the so-called “Likhus”. A little house behind the captain's house at the waterline.

Before 2011, the city was part of the Nijefurd municipality and before 1984 Hindeloopen was an independent municipality.

== Sights ==
In the center visitors can get a feel for Hindeloopen's character by wandering through the narrow streets and looking for the wooden bridges and façades. In the Museum Hindeloopen they can become acquainted with the maritime history and culture of Hindeloopen, which manifests itself in the Hindeloopen art and in its old costumes.

== Gallery ==
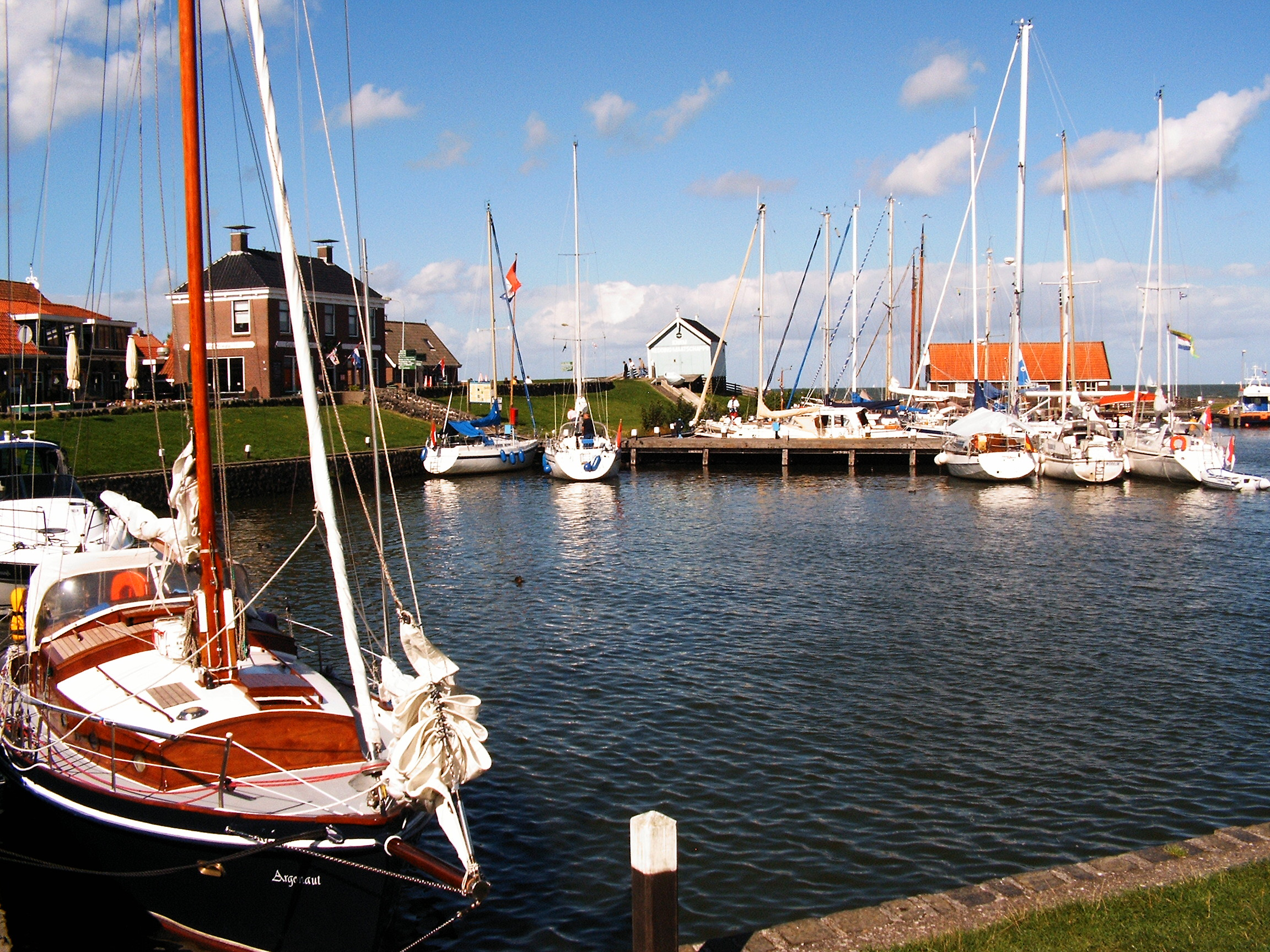
Harbour (2004)

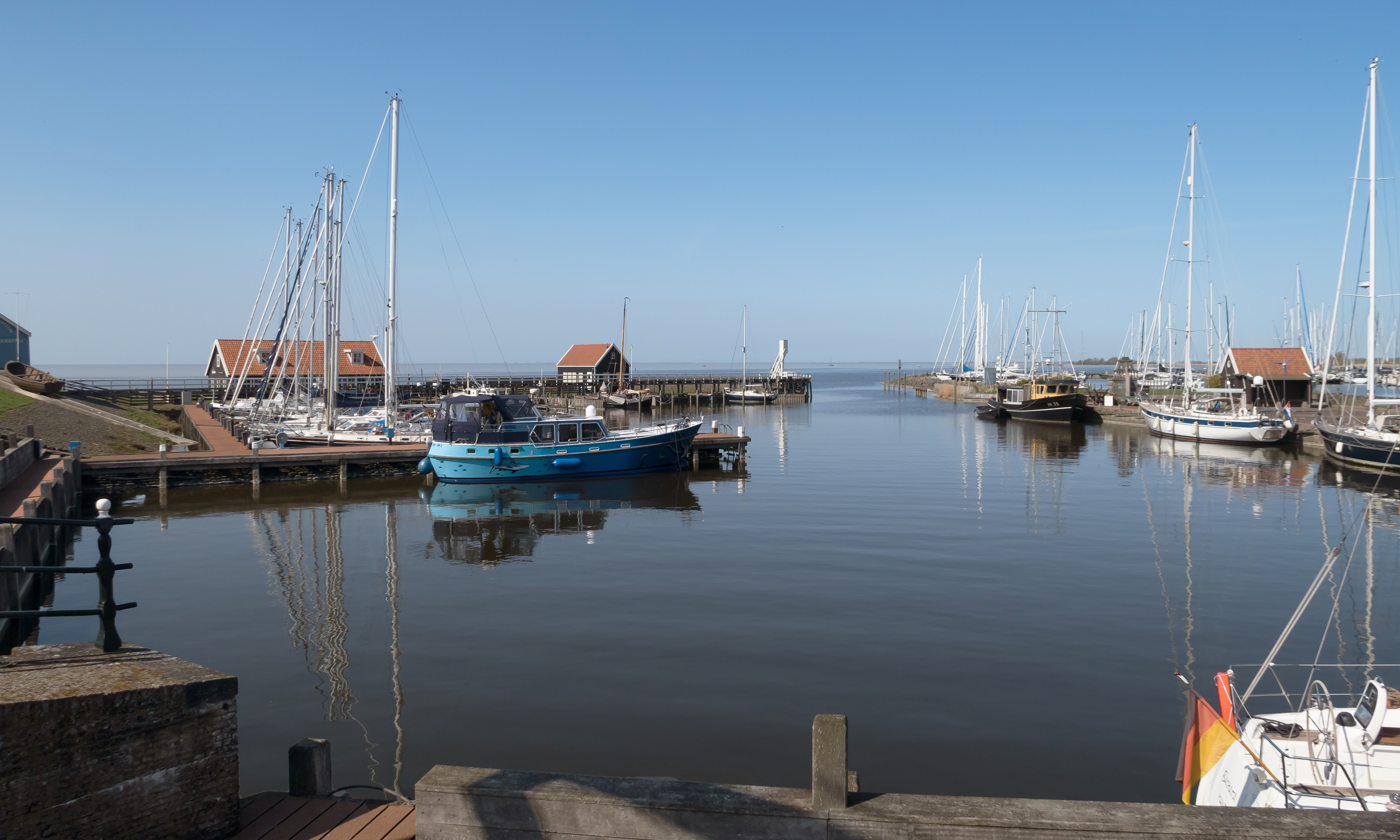
The port of Hindeloopen (2018)

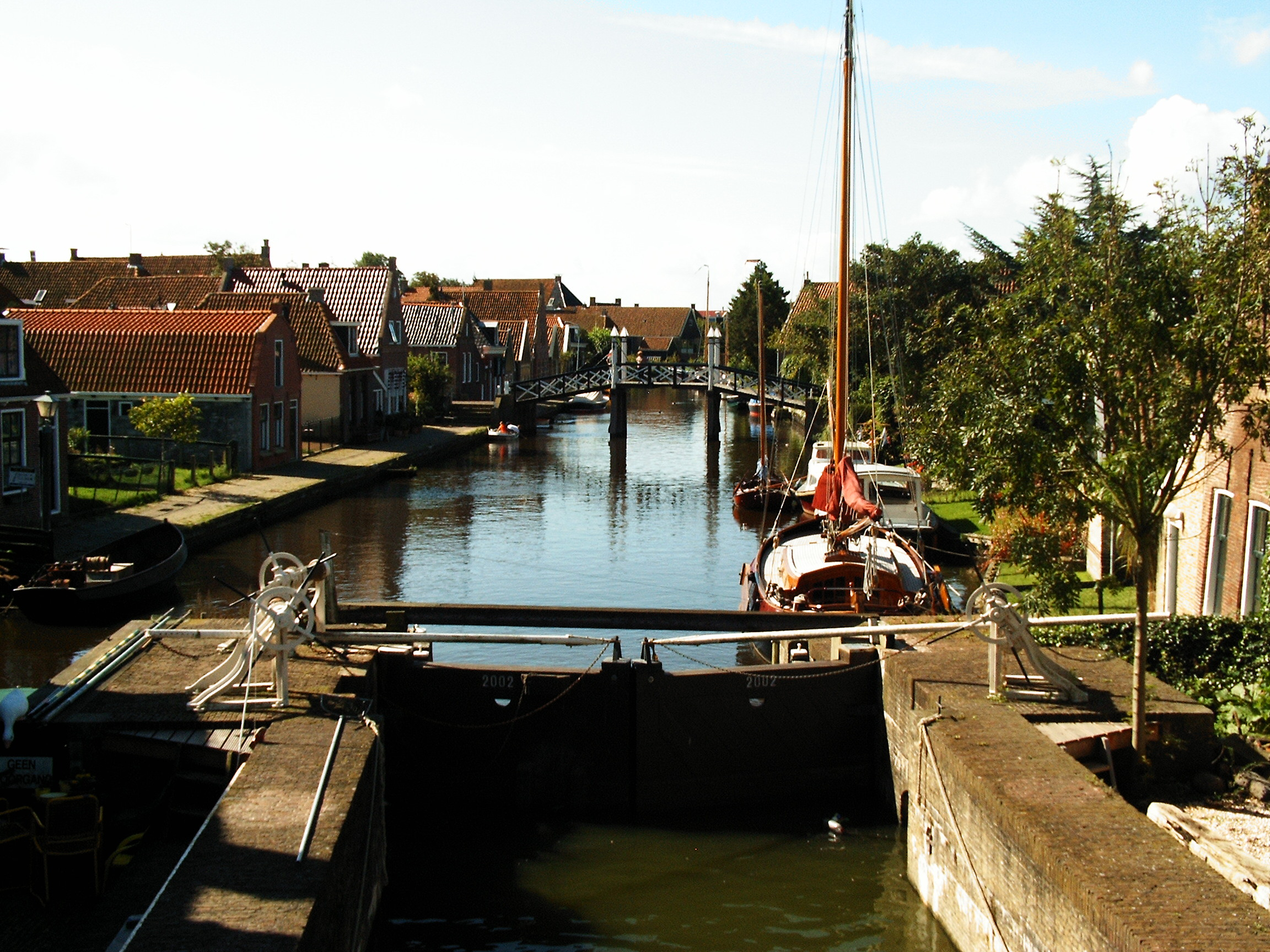
Sylroede, seen from the sluice (2004)

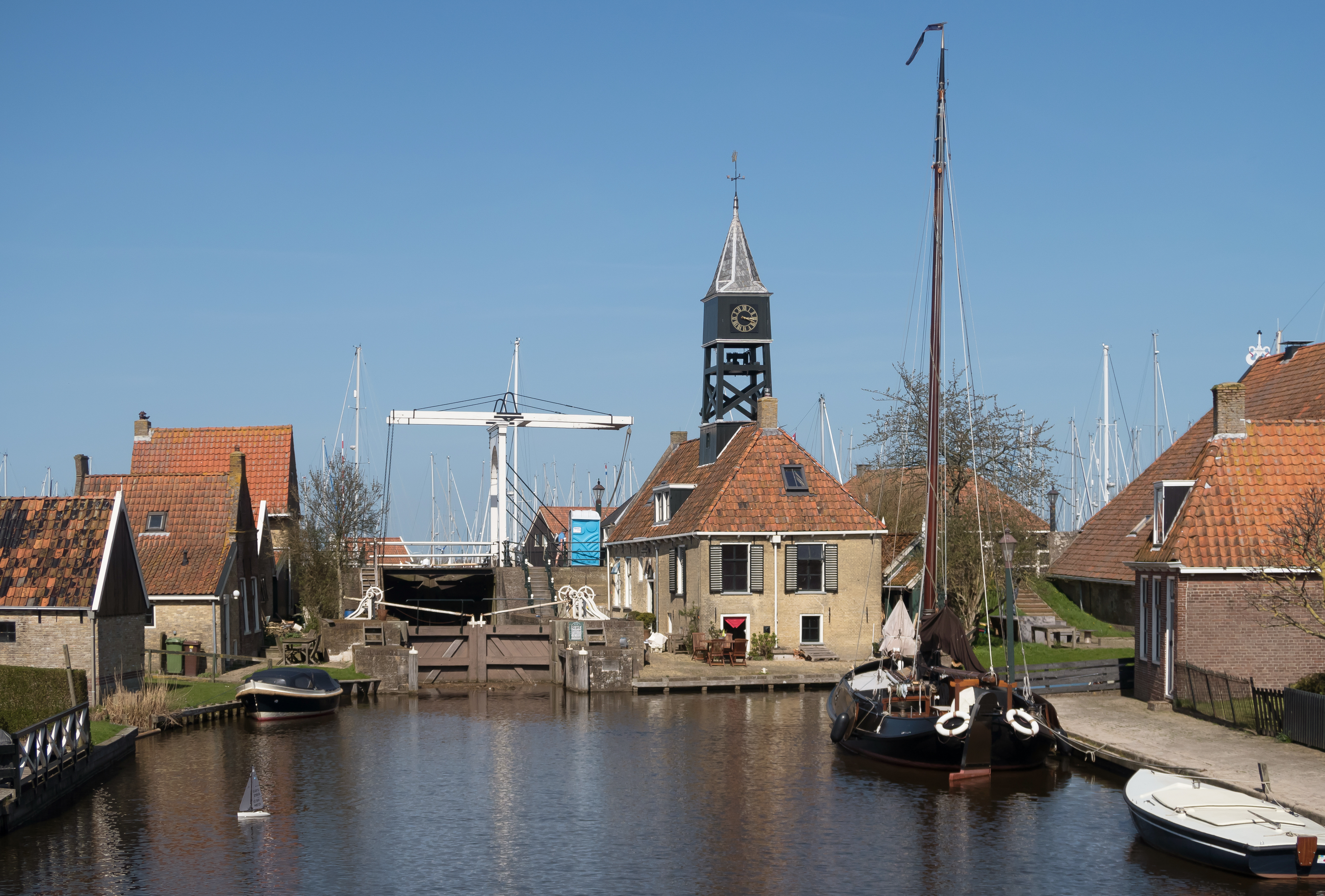
Lock with the wooden drawbridge and the lockkeeper's house

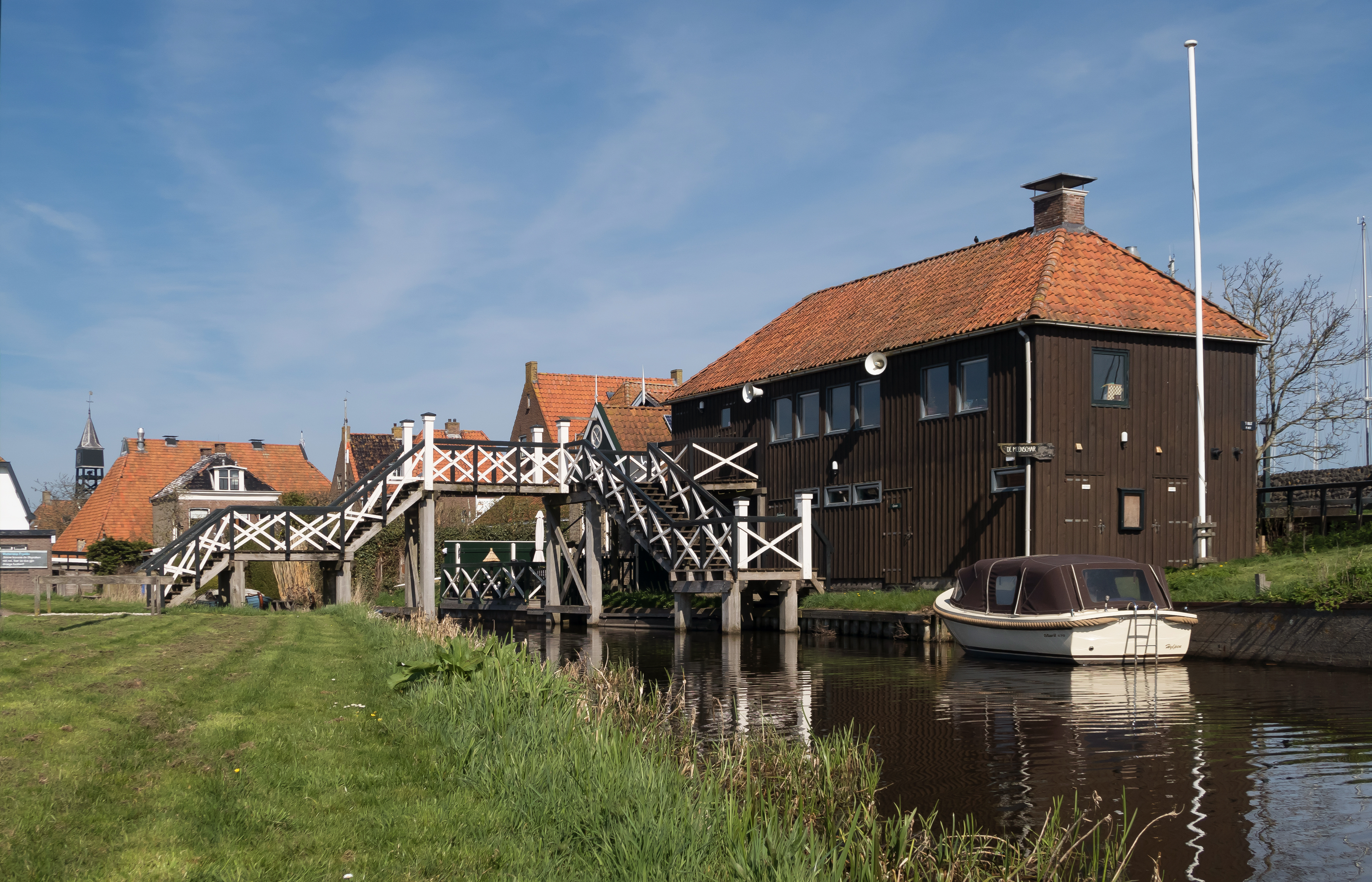
The building at the entrance of the town from Workum

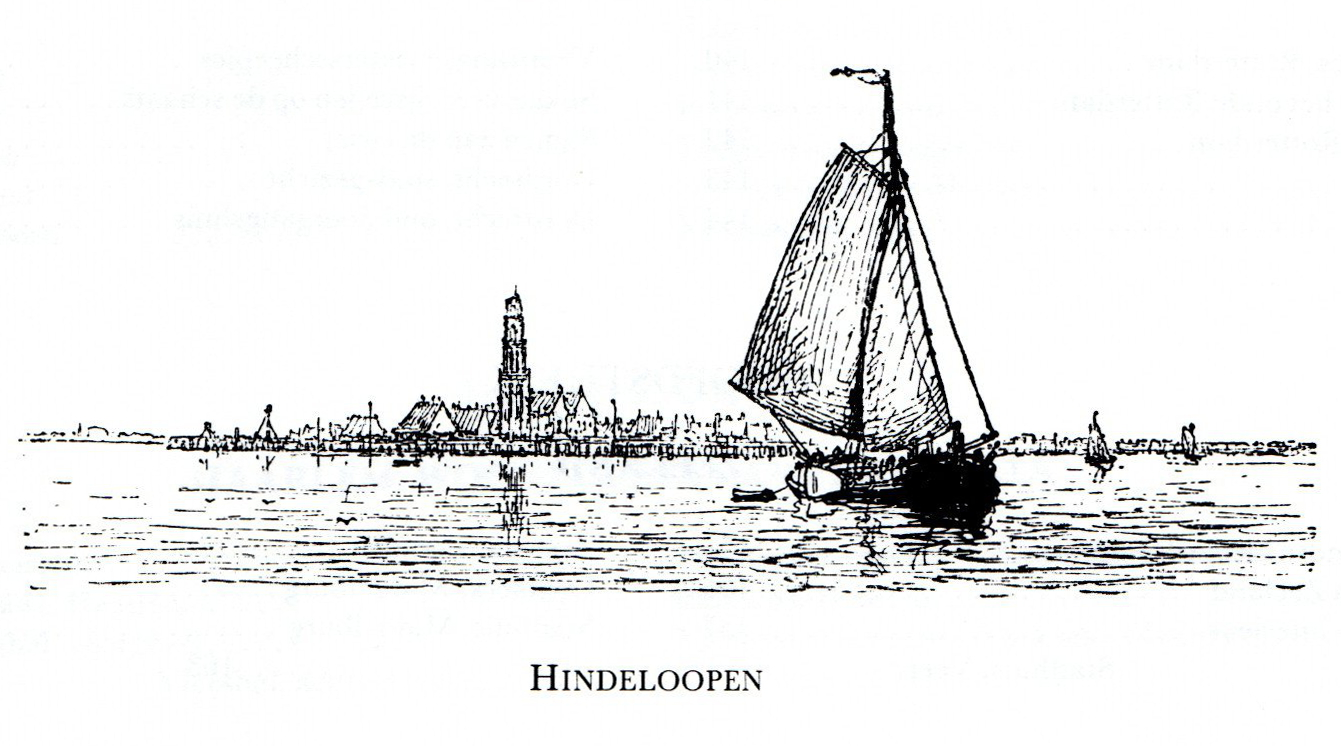
Hindeloopen (Pictures from Holland 1887) door Richard Lovett

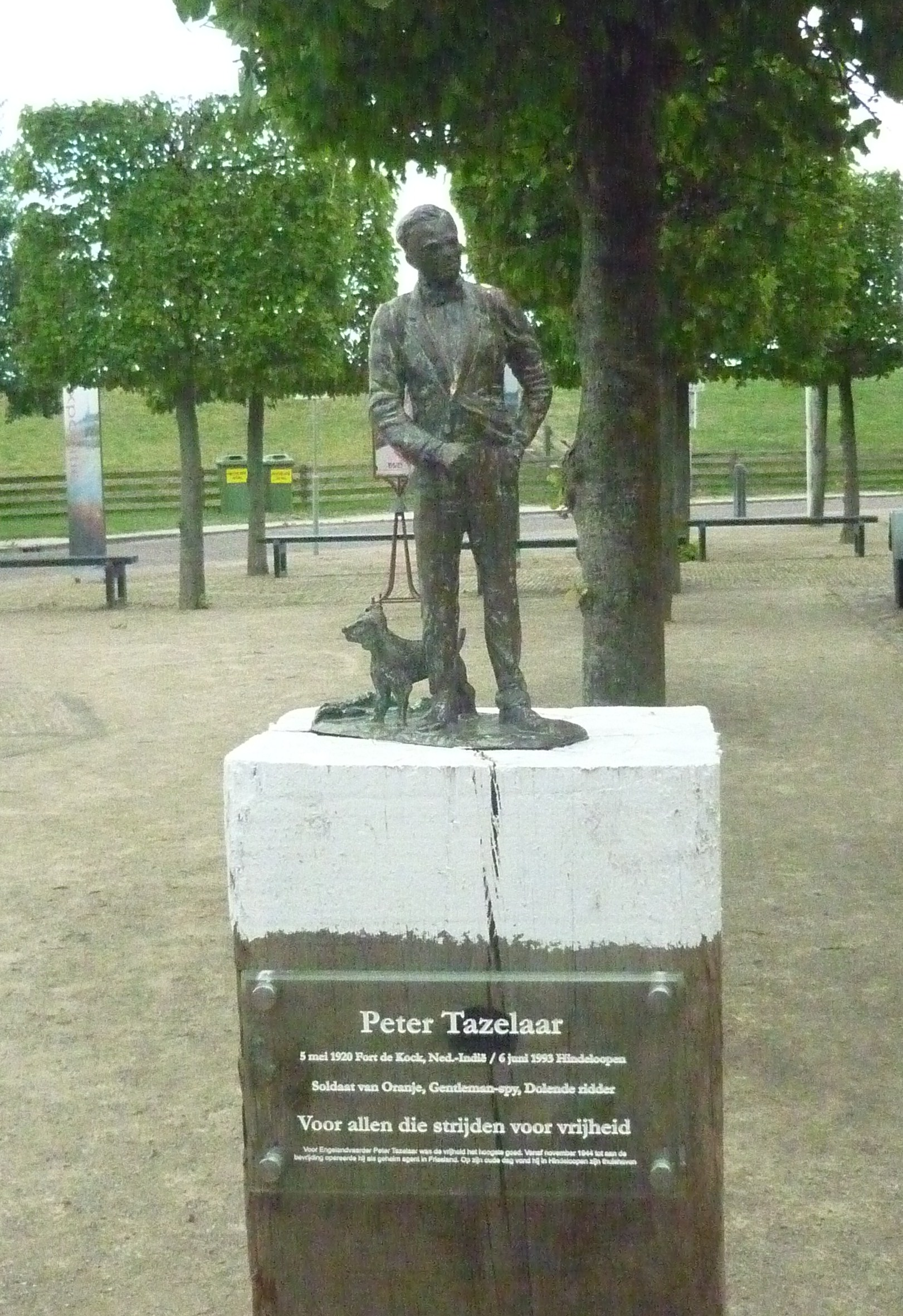
Memorial statue of Peter Tazelaar in Hindeloopen

== Notable residents ==
- Peter Tazelaar
