= Jacob Vredeman de Vries =

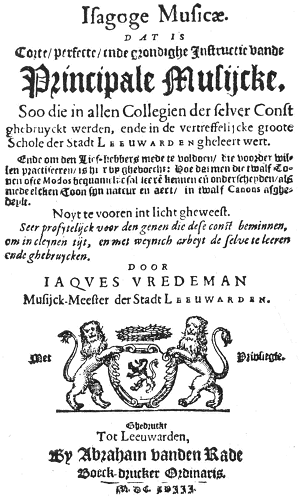
Vredemans’ "Isagoge musicae" (1618)

Jacob Vredeman de Vries (or Jacques) (Mechelen, circa 1563/1564 - Leeuwarden, September 1621) was a kapellmeister and composer of music in Leeuwarden. Jacques Vredeman published 12 villanelles in the West Frisian language.

== Life ==
He was a son of Hans Vredeman de Vries, originally from Leeuwarden, and a brother of Paul, and Salomon. Vredeman received his musical education in Mechelen but moved to the north around 1588, after many cities in the Southern Netherlands were occupied by Alexander Farnese.

== Work ==
Only two publications by his hand survived:

The book "Musica miscella o mescolanze di madrigali, canzoni, e villanelli in lingua Frisica a quatro & cinque voci" was published in Franeker by Gilli van den Rade, who was one of the major Calvinistic publishers of Antwerp; he also worked as a legal printer in Friesland. The Frisian villanelles deal with the farmer’s life in a mildly comical way. Back when they were composed, the West Frisian language wasn’t considered as a language suitable for serious songs yet. Only with Gysbert Japix did this appreciation come into existence, and was the language seen as suitable for subjects such as serious love poetry, political chants, and psalms.

Vredemans’ "Isagoge musicae, dat is corte, perfecte instructie van de principale musycke" was published in 1618.
