= Interior of a Gothic Church =

Painting by Paul Vredman de Vries

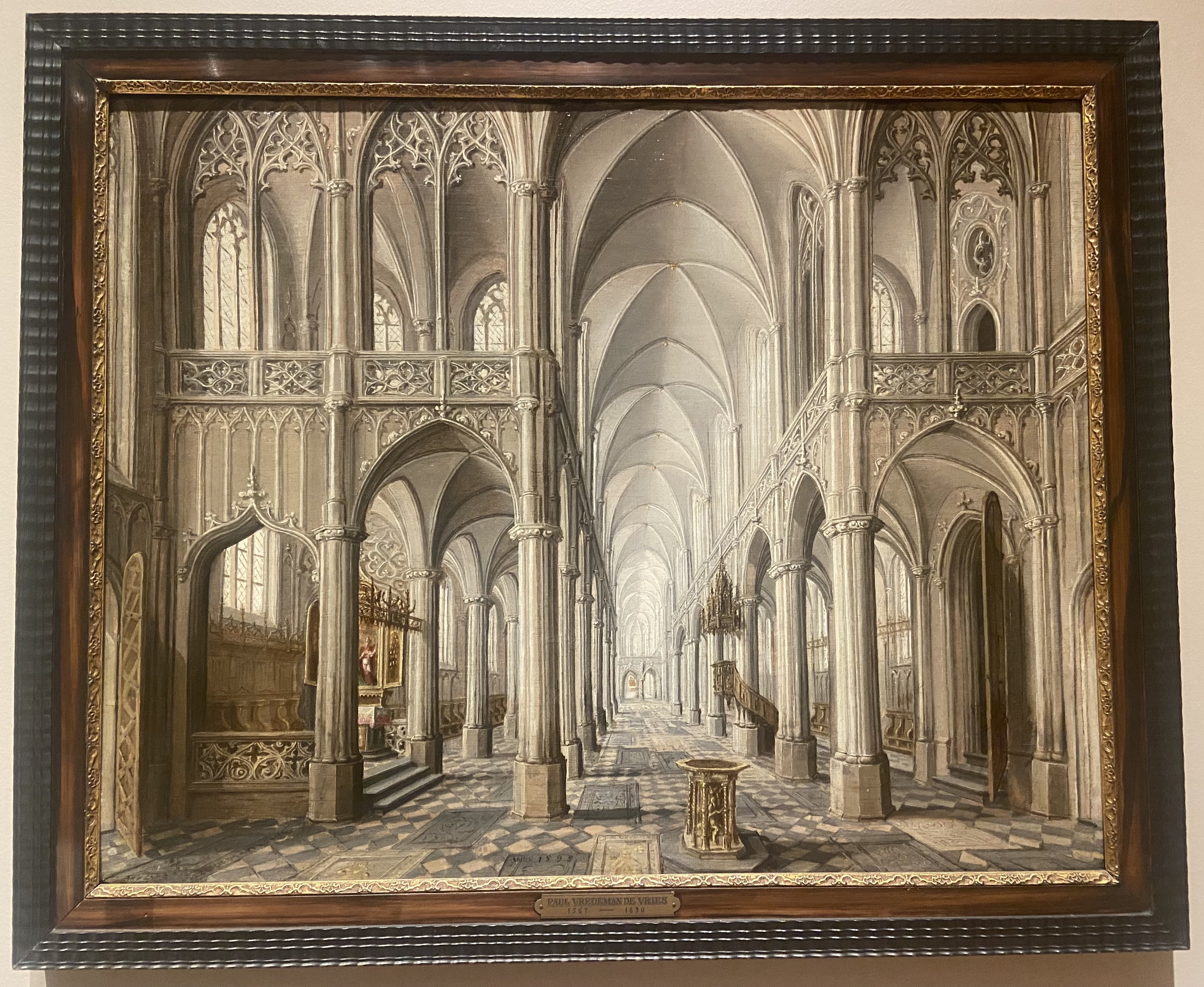
- Paul Vredeman de Vries uses the technique of perspective to illustrate the architectural elements of the church on a flat surface.
- Artist: Paul Vredeman de Vries
- Year: 1595
- Medium: Oil on panel
- Location: Memorial Art Gallery, Rochester, New York
- Accession: 1998.19
- Website: https://magart.rochester.edu/objects-1/info/3896?sort=0

Interior of a Gothic Church is an oil on panel painting by Paul Vredeman de Vries. The painting was completed in 1595 and is currently on display at the Memorial Art Gallery in Rochester, New York.

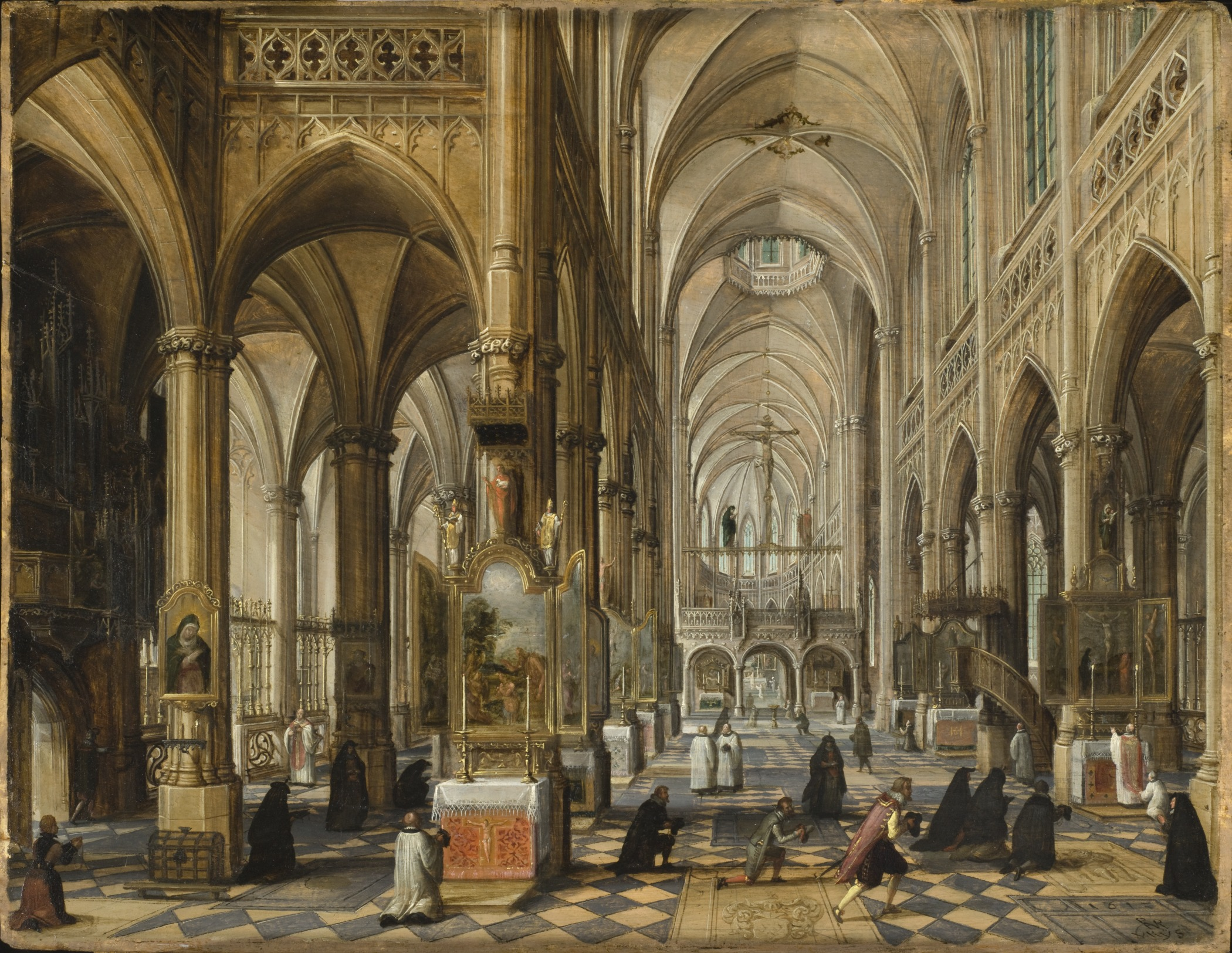
Interior of a Gothic Cathedral by Paul Vredeman de Vries, 1612, Oil on wood, from the Los Angeles County Museum of Art

== Background ==
Paul Vredeman de Vries’s paintings follow the Flemish architecture movement that began as a response to the Renaissance. Paul studied art under his father - Hans Vredeman de Vries. Hans was one of the leading Flemish painters during the 16th century. Paul and Hans would often collaborate on paintings together and were both categorized as artists under the title “architectural specialists” – meaning that their work focused on the painting of large-scale buildings. Interior of a Gothic Church falls under this genre of an architectural painting through its use of perspective and following of Gothic architecture style. The painting is unique as architectural specialist artists are often insufficiently represented in museums and art history.

== Perspective ==
Interior of a Gothic Church uses perspective to illustrate the three-dimensional church interior on a two-dimensional panel surface. In the image, the viewer's eyes naturally move from the front of the image to the central vanishing point. The vanishing point in Interior of a Gothic Church is surrounded by arches, windows and doorways. Further, the rays of light omitted from the windows and door openings point to the vanishing point as well. The combination of surrounding objects and light rays that lead to the vanishing point is intentional because artists such as Vredeman de Vries place objects around an area of an image to bring the viewer's attention to the central aspect of a painting.

The painting is purely an architectural work which differs from subsequent Vredeman de Vries paintings such as Interior of a Gothic Cathedral. Interior of a Gothic Cathedral was painted in 1612 by Vredeman de Vries. In Interior of a Gothic Cathedral people are painted moving throughout each section of the work. The implementation of people moves the viewer's eyes across the image and towards the vanishing point. Interior of a Gothic Cathedral illustrates how Vredeman de Vries populated paintings with figures to convey religious narratives - as other Antwerp artists such as Abel Grimmer accomplishes in his A Ball. The addition of people contribute to conveying perspective as opposed to Interior of a Gothic Church, which relied solely on architectural elements to lead the viewer to the central vanishing point.

== Influences ==
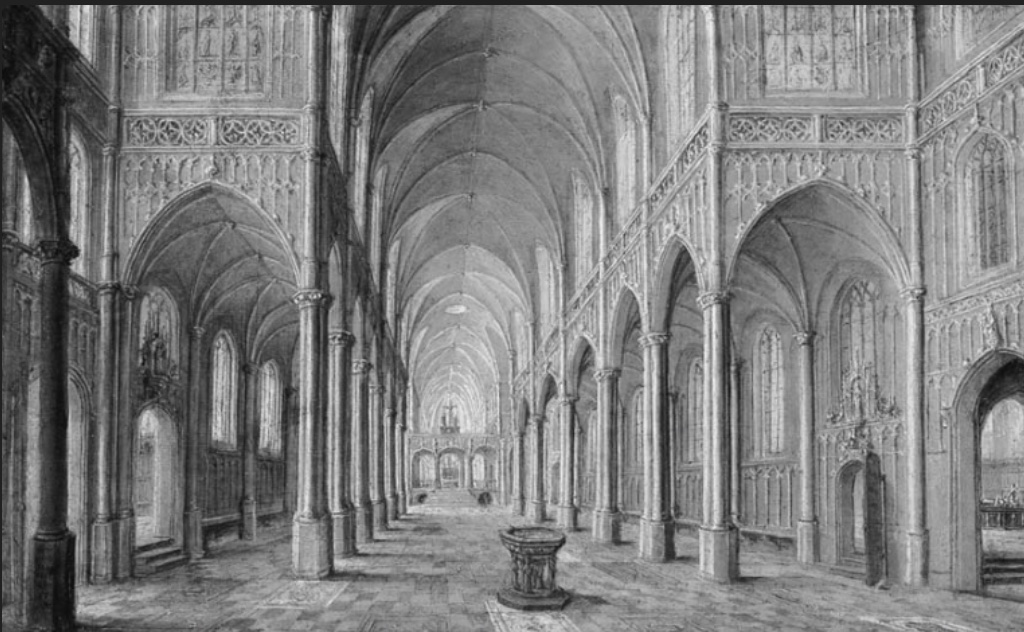
Interior of a Gothic Church by Hans Vredeman de Vries, 1594, Oil on panel, Private Collection in Germany.

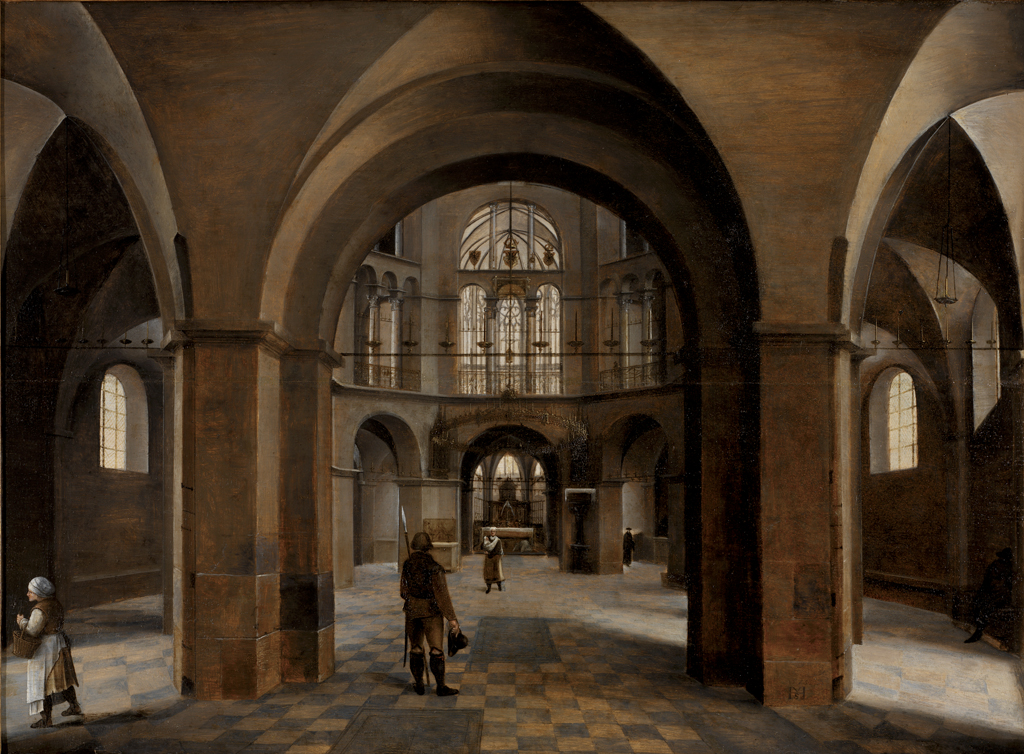
Interior of Aachen Cathedral by Hendrick Van Steenwicjk I, 1573, Oil on panel, Accession 10632, from the Bavarian State Paintings Collection in Munich, Germany.

=== Hans Vredeman de Vries ===
Hans Vredeman de Vries worked as a painter in Danzig, Germany, from the early 1590s to 1596. During this time, he produced many paintings of church interiors for Protestant clients. In the book, The city rehearsed: object, architecture, and ritual in the worlds of Hans Vredeman de Vries by University of Rochester Professor Christopher Heuer, there is an image of a wooden panel by Hans titled, Interior of a Gothic Church. Heuer explains how the panel may have functioned as a modello - meaning that it may have been a work that was copied by local students, such as Paul. There are distinct similarities between Interior of a Gothic Church by Paul Vredeman de Vries and Interior of a Gothic Church by Hans Vredeman de Vries. The two paintings connect in their composition from their empty interiors, central basins, and columns. Although there is more detail in Paul's painting than in Hans - Paul is known for embellishing his father's artwork and adding more details to his paintings. In contrast, Hans typically focuses on the strict composition of his work. The strict composition of Hans' Interior of a Gothic Church being empty is brings the viewer towards a point of optimal observation - with in this case, being the back three arches.

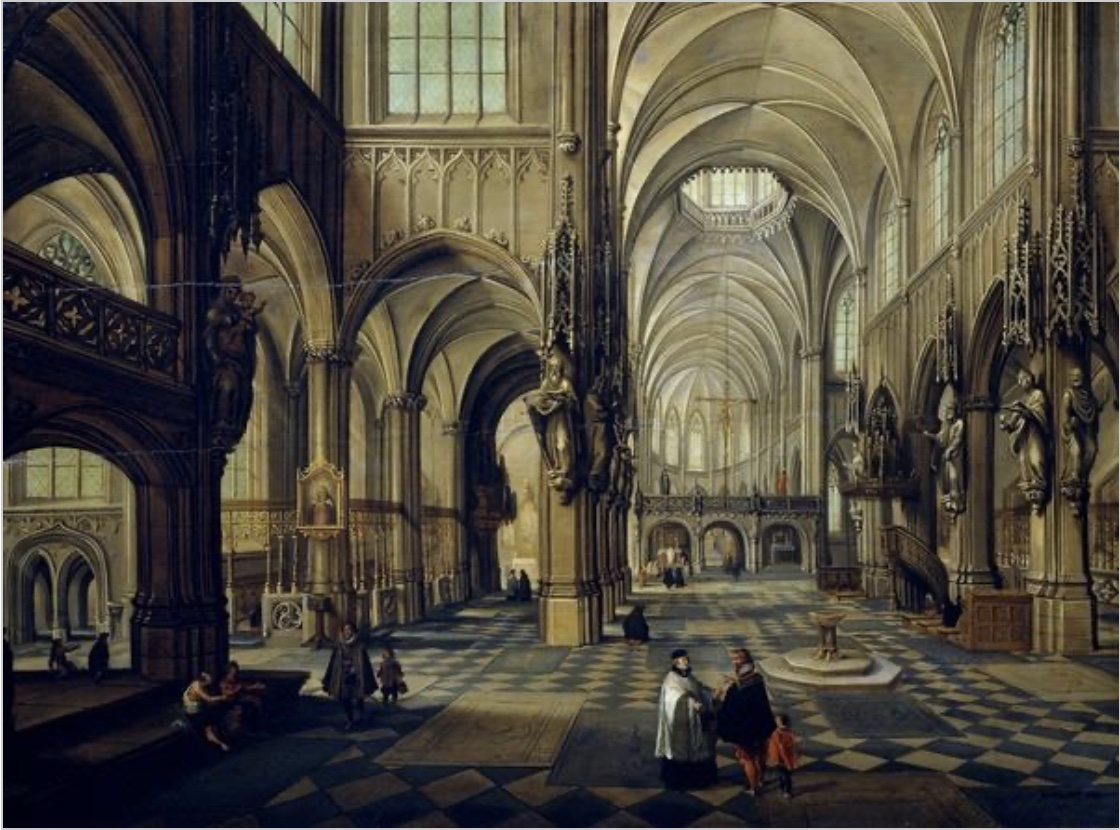
Interior of a Gothic Church by Hendrick van Steenwijck I, 1550 - 1603, from The Bridgeman Art Library in Berlin, Germany.

==== Hendrick Van Steenwijck I ====
Hendrick Van Steenwijck I created the first known architectural painting, Interior of Aachen Cathedral in 1573. Aachen Cathedral is currently being held in the Bavarian State Paintings Collection in Munich, Germany. Hendrick was an architectural specialist artist at the same time as Hans and Paul Vredeman de Vries. The three artists not only often collaborated on works of art together, but Hendrick was also a student under Hans in Germany.

Hendrick painted Interior of a Gothic Church between the years of 1550 - 1603, and it is currently on display at The Bridgeman Art Library in Berlin, Germany. Due to this time having overlap with the period Hendrick was a student under Hans - the similarities between the two paintings, it is very possible that Hendrick's Interior of a Gothic Church is of the same church that Hans and Paul painted from or possibly even a copy of Hans' work. There are differences across the paintings ranging from the addition of people to the wider width of the arches - yet there are similarities in terms of the basin's placement, the placement of three arches side-by-side in the background, digression of tiles from the foreground as they move towards the backrest arches, and the formation of the ceiling.
