= Harings =

Harings is a Dutch surname. Notable people with the surname include:

- Ger Harings (born 1948), Dutch cyclist
- Huub Harings (born 1939), Dutch cyclist
- Jan Harings (born 1945), Dutch cyclist
- Matthijs Harings (1593–1667), Dutch Golden Age portrait painter
- Haring Harings (1815-1907), Dutch drummer
- Wil Harings (1912-1986), Dutch East Indies football player
