= Old Frisian =

Early form of the Frisian language

- Frīsesk
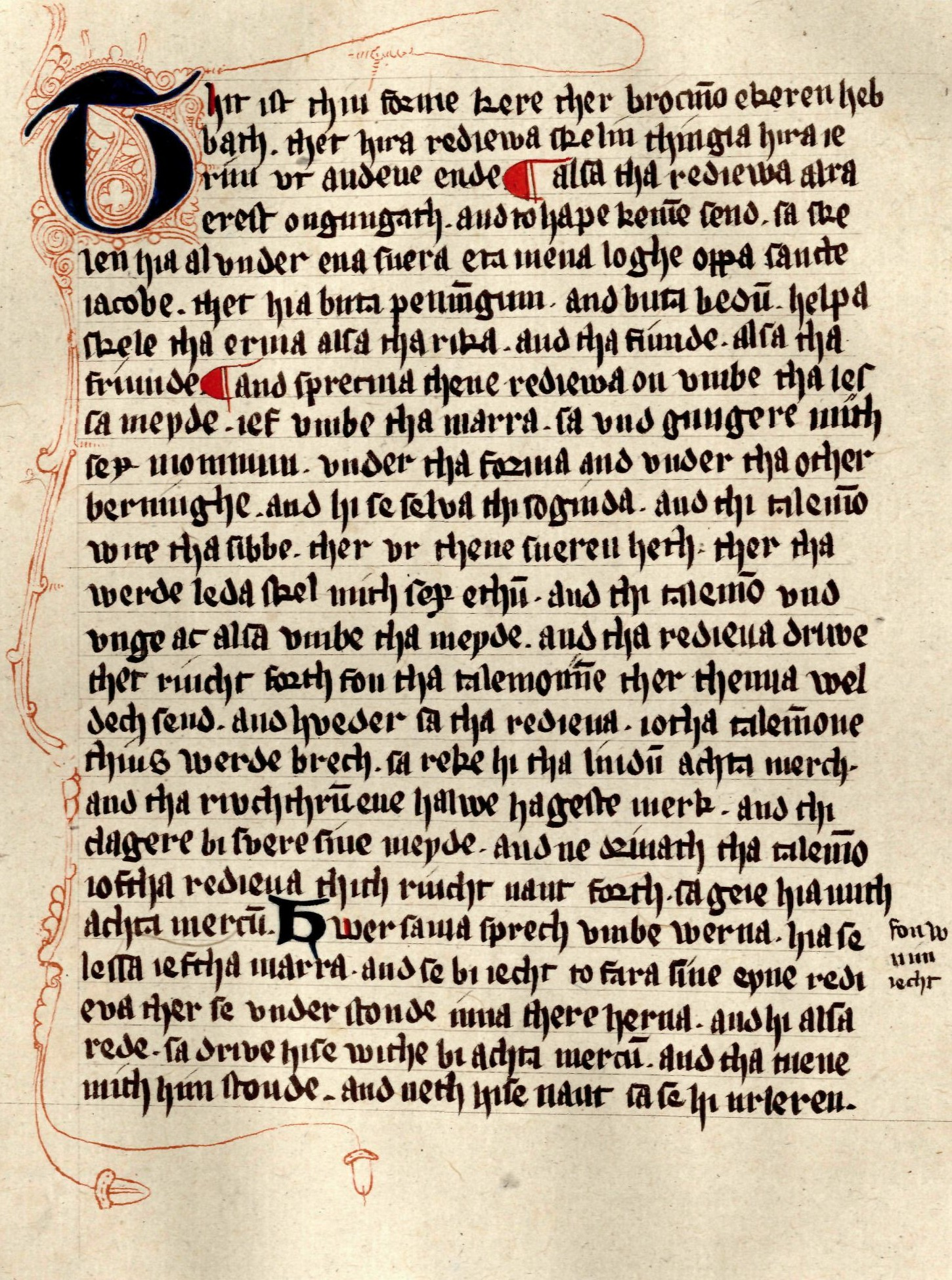
- A page of the Brokmerbrief (1345)
- Region: Frisia (modern-day Netherlands, Belgium, Germany, and Southern Denmark)
- Ethnicity: Frisians
- Era: 1275 to c. 1600
- Language family: Indo-European: Germanic; West Germanic; North Sea Germanic; Anglo-Frisian? (Note: See § Relationship with English for a discussion of the phylogenetic relationship to English.); Frisian; Old Frisian
- Early form: Pre–Old Frisian
- Dialects: West; East (Weser; Ems); North; South
- Writing system: Latin script

Language codes
- ISO 639-3: ofs
- Glottolog: oldf1241

Old Frisian was a West Germanic language spoken between the late 13th century and the end of the 16th century. It was spoken by Frisians who comprised a loose confederacy along the North Sea coast from around modern-day Bruges in Belgium to the Weser River in modern-day northwestern Germany. The vast majority of the surviving literature is composed of legal documents and charters, though some poetry, historiographies, and religious documents are attested as well. Surviving texts show remarkable uniformity across time and space, evidence of an early standard language for the Frisians.

Grammatically, Old Frisian generally marked for four cases, three genders, and two tenses, though more complex grammatical functions could be achieved through periphrastic constructions, where other words may be added to create different grammatical meanings. Its vocabulary had a variety of origins including loanwords from Celtic and Slavic languages. Latin loanwords and calques were relatively common as a result of Christianization. Word order in Old Frisian was varied; although its typical constituent word order was subject–object–verb, many different word orders are attested in the surviving texts.

Old Frisian is the common ancestor of all modern Frisian languages except for the Insular North Frisian languages, with which Old Frisian shares a common ancestor called Pre–Old Frisian or Proto-Frisian. Old Frisian was closely related to and shared common characteristics with the forms of English and Low German spoken during the period. Scholars have argued that the term Old Frisian is somewhat misleading, since Old Frisian was contemporary with other Germanic languages during their "Middle" period, such as Middle English and Middle High German. Although earlier scholarship contended that Frisian and English had a closer relationship to each other than to Low German, this is no longer the prevailing view.

By the 15th century, use of Old Frisian had begun to decline as the language was gradually displaced by Middle Low German as the language of trade in the North Sea. In the mid-16th century, a century-long internal conflict between two competing factions led to Frisia's subjugation by the Duchy of Saxony, which further displaced the language with Early Modern Dutch as the language of administration. No original Old Frisian compositions occur at all after 1450 and the last known work in the language was created in 1547, though writings made shortly thereafter suggest the Old Frisian used was probably already archaic by that point. By around the turn of the 17th century, the language is considered to have fully evolved into Middle Frisian, where it persisted mostly as a rural vernacular language.

== Classification ==
Old Frisian was a member of the West Germanic language family, a subfamily of the larger Germanic languages. It is classified as an Ingvaeonic language along with Old English and Old Saxon.

=== Periodization ===
The periods of the Frisian languages are traditionally divided into Pre–Old Frisian (before 1275), (Note: This period is also sometimes referred to as "Proto-Frisian" or "Common Frisian".) Old Frisian (1275–1550), Middle Frisian (1550–1800), and modern Frisian (1800–present), though these dates vary among scholars. R. L. Trask, for example, puts the end of the Old Frisian period around 1600, while Han Nijdam suggests it ends about a hundred years earlier. Some scholars, such as Germen de Haan, have argued that there is no reason to demarcate them this way and that these periods are more in line with literary periods than linguistic change. Despite its name, Old Frisian was contemporary with Middle Dutch, Middle English, and both Middle High and Middle Low German, though there is some overlap with Old Norse. In general, Old Frisian manuscripts are notably conservative despite their later date.

According to De Haan, what is referred to as "Old Frisian" should really be called "Middle Frisian" and what is called "Middle Frisian" should be referred to as "Early Modern Frisian". De Haan argues that the current nomenclature is misleading and confusing because it incorrectly suggests that Old Frisian is contemporary with other "Old" Germanic languages such as Old English and Old Saxon. The British Old English scholar Alistair Campbell expressed similar views, arguing that the Frisian spoken between the 14th and 16th centuries is better described as "Middle Frisian". In some contexts, the term "Old Frisian" may also refer to what is called either "Pre–Old Frisian" or "Proto-Frisian", or both the Pre–Old Frisian and Old Frisian periods collectively. Frederik Hartmann, for example, cites Rolf Bremmer's analysis of Pre–Old Frisian sound changes but refers to the language as "Old Frisian". Old Frisian legal scholars typically view The Seventeen Statutes (Da Saunteen Kesta) as the first Old Frisian law text, though it is traditionally considered to be an early 11th-century text and at the very latest probably an early 13th-century one.

Bremmer argues that the origins of the "Old" terminology are based on the perception that scholars who study older historical periods are held in higher esteem. He writes that the view of those attempting to give it the "Old" terminology hope that "its antiquity will add to its prestige", though he acknowledges that the nomenclature is functionally "arbitrary". Ultimately, Bremmer sides with the application of "Middle" to this period except for the two Riustring Codices – dated to c. 1300 and 1327, respectively – based on vowel quality in unstressed syllables, itself based on agreed-upon criteria going back to the work of Jacob Grimm.

In general, Old West Frisian manuscripts are attested more recently as compared to Old East Frisian ones; while most Old West Frisian texts are dated to around 1450 to 1525, their Old East Frisian counterparts are typically dated to between 1300 and 1450. In part for this reason, the Old Frisian period is sometimes further divided into "Classical Frisian" and "Post-Classical Frisian", demarcating Old West and Old East Frisian, respectively, as the characteristics differentiating them may be more based on timing than location. In corpora from around the Ommelanden region between the Lauwers and the Ems, for example, some verbal formations are more reminiscent of those traditionally associated with Old West Frisian despite being grouped as clear members of the traditional Old East Frisian dialect group. However, these overlaps may have been the result of several reference documents being shared across the Frisian territories by different scribes and there is some question as to whether the legal documents of these codices were necessarily discovered in the area in which they had jurisdiction. Under this approach, the Classical Frisian period occurred between the 12th and 14th centuries, and is defined by a shared legal tradition on both sides of the Lauwers, while the Post-Classical period is characterized by the erosion of case markers, the complete collapse of the dative–accusative distinction in pronouns, and the growing influence of Dutch in Old West Frisian and Low German in Old East Frisian.

=== Dialects ===
Old Frisian was composed of several dialects. The main division was between Old West Frisian and Old East Frisian, based on their position in relation to the Lauwers river. This divide predated the Old Frisian period as there is evidence that it was split on this basis as early as the 8th century. The linguistic phylogeny – that is, the relation of these varieties to each other through linguistic descent – is described below:

- Pre–Old Frisian
  - Proto–Old Southwest Frisian
    - Proto–Old South Frisian (Note: No written records of South Frisian survive.)
    - Old West Frisian
  - Proto–Old East Frisian
    - Proto–Old Ems Frisian
      - Old Ems Frisian
      - Mainland North Frisian
    - Old Weser Frisian
  - Insular North Frisian

This division was not solely linguistic; the divide was also jurisdictional and ecclesiastical. The diocesan divisions are nearly identical to the dialectal divisions. Old West Frisian, largely coterminous with the Diocese of Utrecht, was divided into two dialects: the southwestern dialect in and around Westergoa and the northeastern dialect in and around Eastergoa. These dialects later developed into a continuum after the sea arm which divided them began to be reclaimed around 1100. Old East Frisian was divided twice as well: Old Weser Frisian in the Diocese of Bremen and Old Ems Frisian in the Diocese of Münster. During the period of Old Frisian, the dialect which later became North Frisian is not attested. Stiles states that both varieties of North Frisian – Insular and Mainland – are ultimately descended from an Eastern Frisian ancestor.

The descendants of Old Weser Frisian – also known as Riustring Old East Frisian – are Wangerooge, Wursten, and Harlingerland Frisian, all of which are now extinct. Old Weser Frisian is attested in two full manuscripts, known as the Riustring Codices, and two fragments. Whether the Old Weser Frisian attested in these documents is the direct ancestor of the Wangerooge or Wursten variants or rather an extremely close relative is a matter of some debate; Stiles argues that the documents' language is closely related to the two but distinct from them, while Bremmer categorizes them as direct descendants. Old Ems Frisian is the ancestor of the now-extinct Emsingo, Brokmerland, and Ommelanden dialects, as well as the still-extant Saterland Frisian, its only living descendant. Old West Frisian later developed into the modern West Frisian language.

Unlike their Mainland counterparts, the Insular North Frisian languages are not descended from Old Frisian. Instead, they share a common ancestor in Pre–Old Frisian, diverging around the late 7th or early 8th centuries.

=== Relationship with English ===
Approximate present-day distribution of the proposed Anglo-Frisian languages in Europe; hatched areas indicate where multilingualism is common Anglic English Scots Frisian West Frisian North Frisian Saterland Frisian

Traditionally, English and the Frisian languages were widely regarded as closer to each other than to any other Germanic language. The German linguist Theodor Siebs is commonly associated with popularizing this affinity and is credited with coining the term Anglo-Frisian languages in his 1889 dissertation entitled Zur Geschichte der Englisch-friesischen Sprache ('On the History of the Anglo-Frisian Languages'). The English philologist Henry Sweet, however, is considered the "father of the Anglo-Frisian hypothesis", articulating the concept as early as 1876. Observations about the close relationship are much older than the 19th century, however; it is likely that Anglo-Saxon missionaries during the 7th and 8th centuries saw the two languages as closely related. Datings proposed for a common ancestor of the Anglo-Frisian languages estimate that it was probably fully formed by the 4th or 5th century, diverging shortly thereafter.

This phylogenetic view of English and Frisian is no longer widely accepted. Linguists argue that – while English, Frisian, and Low German are correctly believed to have a common Ingvaeonic ancestor – there is no reason to believe that English and Frisian shared a uniquely close genetic relationship thereafter. Some shared linguistic changes do overlap in ways unique to these languages, often at similar times, but these changes do not match in terms of their relative chronology; in other words, these common changes do not appear to have occurred at the same time or in the same order. Examples include Old Frisian's vowel breaking and vowel backing processes, which closely resemble Old English's and Old Norse's, but developed independently from them. Instead, some linguists argue that the Ingvaeonic precursor was likely a broad dialect continuum which saw the dialects which later became English and Frisian develop similarly but not as one language. This continuum was spoken across the continental coast of the North Sea prior to the Migration Period, evolving into distinct languages around the turn of the 5th century. The continuum model is sometimes broadened to include Old Low Franconian as well. Under this model, the two language groups did experience a series of changes particular to the area along the North Sea between about 450 and 650, which influenced both languages as well as Dutch, Flemish, and probably northern varieties of Low German.

The English and the Frisians were long associated with each other. Frisians are traditionally believed to have comprised a fairly significant portion of the Germanic invaders of Britain during the Anglo-Saxon period. While no major district of England is named after the Frisians, there is data from the local toponymy – that is, placename origins – to support a significant Frisian settlement, including Friston and Frisby. Genetic evidence has suggested that following the Roman-era exodus of the Frisii, the people who later inhabited the area were genetically indistinguishable from the 5th-century Angles who colonized what is now England. Frisian and English domination of maritime trade in the North Sea also played a role in their relationship; London was a hub for Frisian slave-traders and York had a special quarter for housing Frisian merchants. Although the Anglo-Saxons also invaded and subjugated the Frisians during the 5th century, this is not considered to be a cause for the linguistic similarities.

Other scholars, however, have persisted in supporting the Anglo-Frisian language family as a legitimate phylogenetic category, split into two general outlooks on the relationship. The first is the traditional model, which contends that the two languages diverged from a common Proto-Anglo-Frisian ancestor and thus are sister languages. The other is called the convergence hypothesis, which regards Ingvaeonic as the last common ancestor, but holds that early forms of English and Frisian became increasingly intertwined and influenced by each other to form the striking resemblance each shares to the other. Critics dismiss the convergence approach as unrealistic, pointing to the difficulty of dispersing those kinds of linguistic developments across the maritime divide. The Danish linguist Hans F. Nielsen placed Old Saxon and Old Frisian closer on his phylogenetic tree, with Old English splitting off in the 5th century not long after Old High German split from the rest of the West Germanic languages.

== History ==
=== Speakers ===
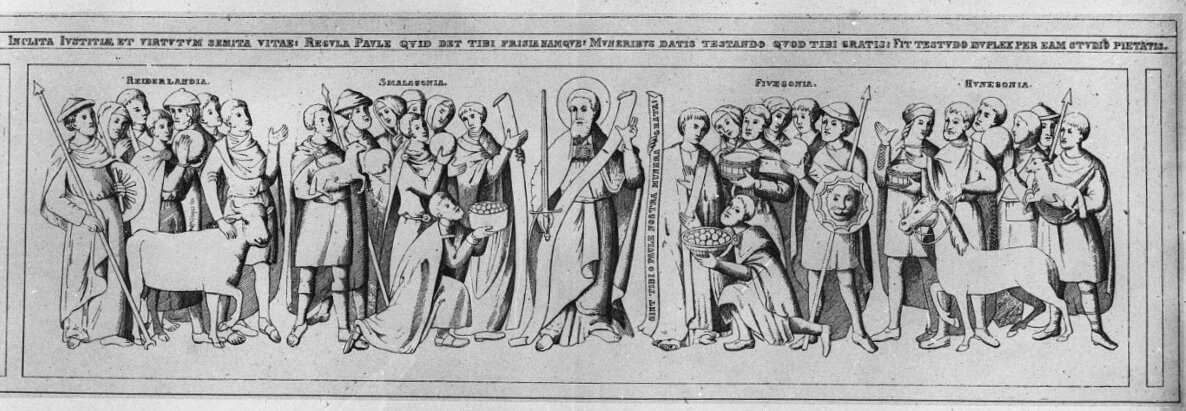
A reproduction of a wall painting at Münster Cathedral showing Frisians offering gifts to the cathedral's patron

During the Early Middle Ages, when Pre–Old Frisian was spoken, the Frisians dominated North Sea trade. Contemporary non-Frisian documents refer to the North Sea as the Frisian Sea (Latin: Mare Frisicum) and the term Frisian was used in Dorestad to mean any merchant, not necessarily an ethnic Frisian. By the early 7th century, the Frisians had expanded from the Sincfal near modern-day Bruges to the Weser estuary. During the latter half of the century, the first wave of Frisians began colonizing the previously uninhabited islands off the southwestern coast of modern-day Denmark, occupying Amrum, Föhr, Sylt, and Heligoland; the linguistic descendants of this migration are the Insular North Frisian speakers, who speak Öömrang, Fering, Söl'ring, and Halunder Frisian varieties, respectively. (Note: Fering and Öömrang are sometimes considered to be one variety.) By the end of the century, the Frisians also controlled the coastal regions from the Scheldt to the Rhine. During the following period, Christianity was introduced to the region by the Anglo-Saxon bishop Willibrord and Frisia was subjugated by the Franks under the leadership of Charles Martel. Charles Martel's incursion into Frisia is probably what led to the departure of the Insular North Frisians from Frisia to the uninhabited islands off the coast of southern Denmark.

The Lauwers in the modern-day Netherlands

During the latter part of the 13th century, when Old Frisian was spoken, the Frisians were divided by the Lauwers river. Those to the west of it were partially conquered by the County of Holland during its long-standing campaigns of conquest, but they were ultimately able to repel Holland's forces, killing its count at the Battle of Warns in 1345. The political situation east of the river is largely obscure during this period, but it appears that the East Frisians were under regular assault from Saxon forces though they were able to keep them at bay. This period is also marked by a loose confederation between the Frisian territories, the Upstalsboom League, which united the Seven Sealands of Frisia and produced legal documents from around 1300, though translations of its original Latin texts only appear in Old West Frisian. Later, an internal rift among the Frisian confederacy increased tensions and ultimately led to the end of the Frisian freedom period in 1498, with the ascension of Albert III of Saxony as gubernator. The following centuries were marked by civil wars including the Guelders Wars, which saw more Frisian casualties than any war thereafter.

=== Corpus ===
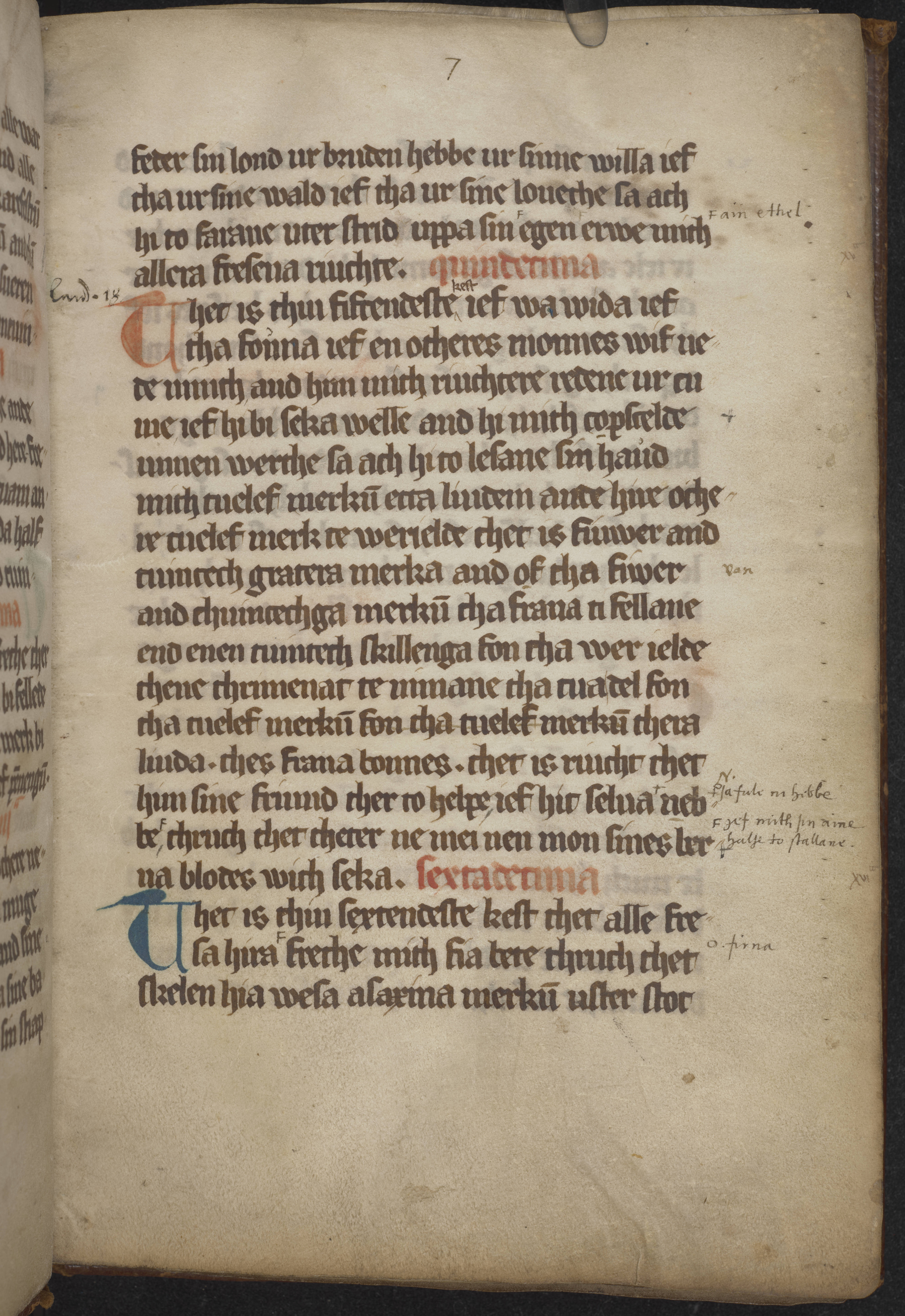
The Hunsingo Statutes, originally formulated in 1252, is one of the oldest surviving Old Frisian texts. This copy dates to about 1350.

Outside of the two dozen surviving Pre–Old Frisian runic inscriptions – all of which are dated to around the 5th through 10th centuries – and some individual words captured in the marginalia of Latin texts, the earliest surviving Frisian-language text is an interlinear gloss of the Psalms found in 2015, which has been dated to around 1100. The first full manuscripts are the First Brokmer Codex, written sometime between 1276 and 1300, and the First Riustring Codex, written around 1300. These documents are known to be copies and it is uncertain when, where, or by whom the original texts were written, though it is likely that they were originally composed shortly after 1225.

Legal texts dominate the surviving corpus of Old Frisian documents; all but one of the Frisian-language documents east of the Lauwers are legal documents. To the west, textual diversity is somewhat wider. Western documents include over a thousand charters and administrative documents, though poetry and historiographies have survived alongside them as well as several religious works and a few administrative texts. Most of the existing works were compiled into seventeen legal codices, one being an incunable, which contain several distinct legal texts. Many of the codices are not fully in Old Frisian; the Codex Parisiensis ('Parisian Codex'), for example, contains Middle Low German and Latin supplements, and the Jus Municipale Frisonum ('Municipal Law of the Frisians') ends with a Middle Dutch legal text.

Taken together, the body of surviving Old Frisian documents is remarkably uniform across time and space, and formed an early standard language for Frisians. In general, the legal texts from the High Middle Ages emphasize the role of upholding the social customs and traditions of the peasantry, whereas the texts of the late Middle Ages were shaped much more by the growing influence of Roman law and the canon law of the Catholic Church. Later texts focus heavily on the introduction of an emerging educated class to the legal process as the capacity for urban and regional administration grew. The vast majority of Old Frisian documents, however, have not survived to the modern day and much of what had been preserved was destroyed during the Reformation, especially as monastic orders around the Netherlands were dissolved.

Documentation for Old Frisian is also attested in chronicles and apocrypha, most of which are politically charged and considered inaccurate; the political situation of the Frisians during this period led to ideological influences on the Old Frisian body of literature. For example, the aforementioned incunable, though containing some legal content such as the Statutes of Upstalsboom, begins with an ideologically-driven introduction and has several other documents which likely served to promote the Frisian self-governing, non-feudal social order of the period. Later works emphasize the Frisian legal tradition, especially its sources and purported unbroken line from generations past.

=== Decline and evolution ===
During Latin's descent as the chosen language of legal texts like charters, Frisian also began its linguistic decline. Middle Low German began to displace it, either because it was of higher prestige or more widely understood. However, Old Frisian documents were still widely translated into Middle Low German from the late 15th century until the turn of the 17th century and modern Low German demonstrates traces of Old Frisian influence, including in placenames, personal names, vocabulary, and syntax. Between the Lauwers and the Ems, no original Frisian texts occur in the record after around 1450 and the last known public document composed in Old Frisian dates to 1547 following the introduction of Dutch as the language of administration by the representatives of the Duchy of Saxony during the 16th century.

By 1550, the language is considered to have developed into Middle Frisian, mostly as a vernacular in rural areas, or been superseded by Stêdsk, a Frisian–Dutch mixed language used primarily in cities by Frisians who could not speak Dutch. Documents produced after 1550 show marked differences in orthography and grammar, suggesting that during the first half of the 16th century, the Old Frisian documents being produced were already quite archaic. During the emerging Modern Frisian period in the 19th century, Old Frisian documents were once again being consulted as inspiration for orthographic standards. Around the middle of the century, Harmen Sytstra developed an orthography based largely on the conventions of Old Frisian documents. A variant of it vied to become the written standard for West Frisian, but lost out to an orthography developed by the Brothers Halbertsma, which was based largely on the work of the Middle Frisian poet Gysbert Japicx.

== Vocabulary ==
=== Native vocabulary ===
Although the vast majority of Old Frisian vocabulary can be traced directly to Proto-Germanic, many terms were created through compounding or affixation, and were borrowed from other languages. Only a few adverb-forming suffixes are attested; adverbs could otherwise be formed using either the genitive or dative case. Nouns were regularly combined without any use of genitive forms, such as in fiskdam ('fishing weir'), though it became increasingly common to mark the first element with a linking genitive form like -s, such as in sumeresnacht ('summer night'), in later forms of the language. Adjectives were also compounded with nouns to form other adjectives, such as ūdertam ('easy to milk', lit. 'udder-tame').

Although relatively rare, kennings – a kind of Germanic compound with a metaphorical meaning – are attested in some Old Frisian documents. For example, criminal regulations regarding the protection of children and pregnant women use the term bēnenaburch (Note: The alternative form bēnetaburch is also found. For the long vowel, see Bremmer 2009, p. 94.) ('fortress of the bones') to reference the womb. Among expressive vocabulary, more words for anger are attested than any other emotion.

=== Loanwords ===
Loanwords in Old Frisian comprised inherited borrowings from earlier languages – such as rīke ('kingdom, realm') borrowed from a Celtic language during either the Proto-Germanic or Proto–West Germanic periods – and borrowings during the Old Frisian period. Old Frisian borrowed a number of Latin terms from all three periods and it is often difficult to pinpoint precisely when the Latin loan entered the language. Old Frisian also appears to have borrowed terms from the Slavic languages through Low German, including the term cona ('fur') which was used as money in Riustring (compare the Serbo-Croatian term kuna). Terms from Old French were also borrowed, probably through one or more intermediaries. Examples include payement ('payment') and amīe ('female lover, concubine'). Old Frisian also borrowed a number of abstract suffixes from French.

Old Saxon and Middle Low German also contributed significantly to Old Frisian vocabulary. By the end of the 15th century, Middle Low German had emerged as the language of trade in the North Sea, displacing Old Frisian dialects spoken east of the Lauwers. Terms borrowed include reth ('wheel'; from Old Saxon rath) and swāger ('brother-in-law'). Similarly, Old Saxon and Middle Low German served as an intermediary for Old and Middle High German borrowings; these include terms like keisere ('emperor'; from Old High German kaisar) and iunkfrouwe ('young woman, virgin').

=== Effects of Christianization ===
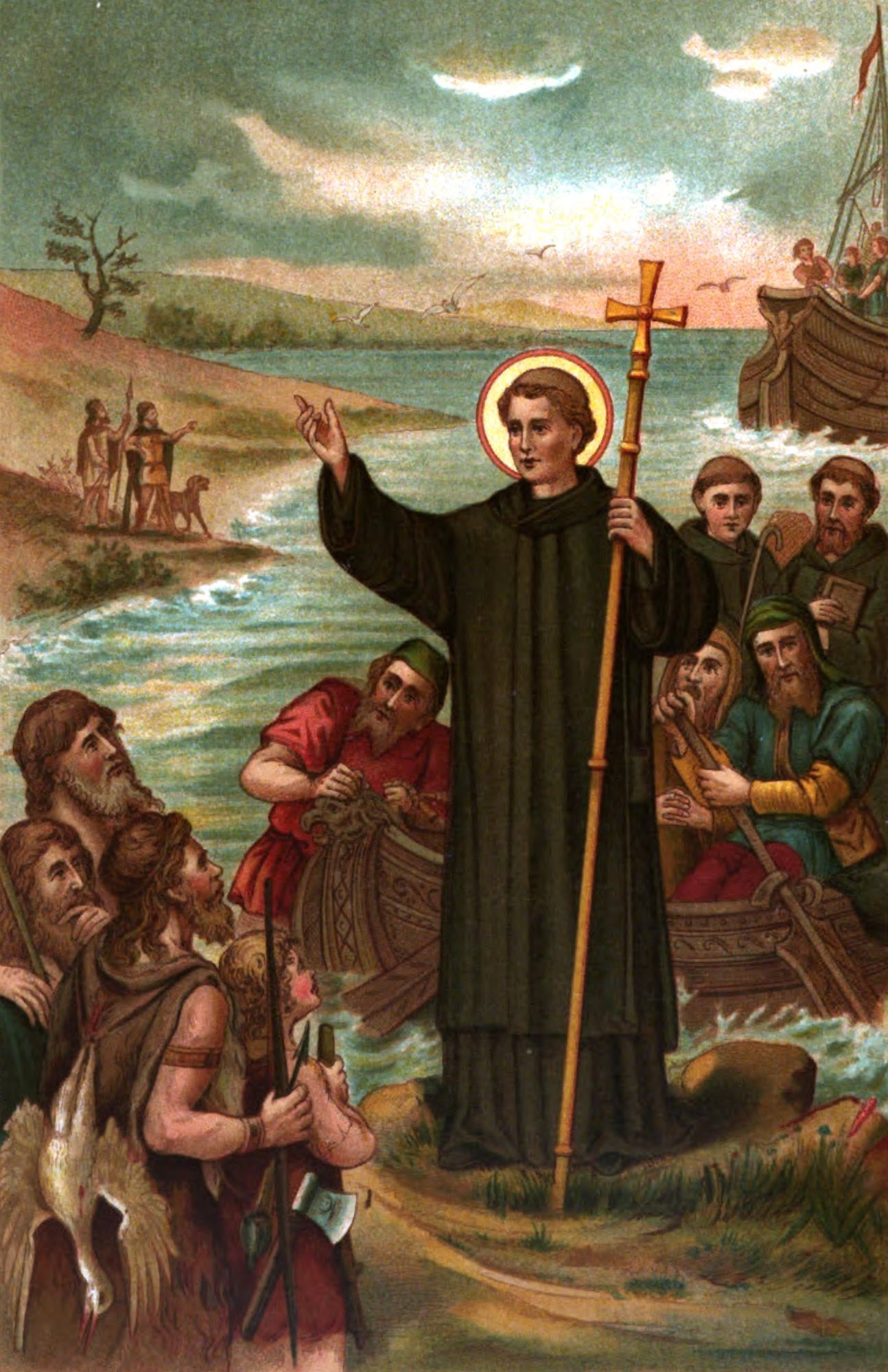
Old Frisian vocabulary was influenced by the Christianization of the Frisians.

After the Christianization of the Frisians around the 8th century, the language experienced an influx of Latin and its Greek loans, such as diōvel ('devil'; from Latin diabolus), skrīva ('to write'; from Latin scrībere, displacing the native term wrīta), and seininge ('blessing'; from Latin signum 'sign of the cross'). Because the Anglo-Saxons converted the Frisians to Christianity, it is probable that Old English terms began to enter the language around this time, though the close relationship between the two languages makes distinguishing native words from Old English borrowings extremely difficult. Possible borrowings may include trachtia ('to yearn'; from Old English treahtian, 'to comment on') and diligia ('to delete'; from Old English dīlegian, 'to blot out, to erase'), though these terms may have been borrowed from Old English to missionary centers in other Germanic-speaking areas and then into Old Frisian.

Calques were common in Old Frisian, especially for Latin terms adopted during the Christianization of the Frisians, such as godeshūs ('church', lit. 'God's house'; Latin domus Dei) and elemechtich ('almighty'; Latin omnipotens). Other loan translations include the days of the week and some terms associated with the military or leadership roles, such as hāvedmon ('leader, chieftain'; Latin capitaneus) (Note: For the relationship between Old Frisian hāved and Latin caput, see Boutkan & Siebinga 2005, pp. 155–156.) and herestrēte ('highroad, military road'; Latin via militaris). Alternations between native Old Frisian words and Latin loans bled into legal texts as well, often as glosses or definitions. Examples include in the Freeska Landriucht, where the terms scelta and aesgha both are glossed as Latin iudex ('judge, magistrate'), even though the duties in Frisian society were not equivalent.

== Phonology ==
Old Frisian phonology has been reconstructed by analyzing the existing corpora and the language's modern descendants. In general, Old Frisian scribes used a largely phonemic orthography, where each letter signifies a distinct phoneme. With limited exceptions, stress fell on the stem, the base form of the word to which affixes may be added.

=== Vowels ===
Old Frisian vowels
| Type | Front | | Back | |
| Type | short | long | short | long |
|---|---|---|---|---|
| Close | i | iː | u | uː |
| Mid | e | eː, ɛː | o | oː, ɔː |
| Open | (æ) | | a | aː |

No distinction was made orthographically in early Old Frisian to provide for vowel length, though in later forms of the language an ⟨e⟩ or ⟨i⟩ was placed after the vowel to indicate a long vowel, as in baem ([baːm], 'tree'). The vowel /æ/ may have been a marginal phoneme, where it is found in one extant manuscript as a reflex of the same Proto–West Germanic phoneme, though inclusion of /æ/ is based on very little evidence.

The language had two diphthongs: iā and iū, the latter of which was interchangeable with iō. The long vowel in iā is assumed from attestations in Old West Frisian, but it is unclear if it was long in earlier forms of the language, as the vowel length is unclear in the older Old East Frisian manuscripts. In later Old West Frisian, the traditional iā developed into [ɪɛː], usually written as iee. While there were rising diphthong short forms in iu~io, no short *ia is attested. Other marginal diphthongs existed too. For example, ei was common in loanwords, as in keiser ('emperor') from Old High German, though it existed in some native terms such as dei. Later developments include /ai/, as in flail ('flail'). Two consecutive vowels did not always form a diphthong. For example, fīand ('enemy') has a syllable break between the first vowel and the second.

=== Consonants ===
Old Frisian consonants
| Type | Bilabial | | Dental | | Alveolar | | Palatal | Velar | | Glottal |
|---|---|---|---|---|---|---|---|---|---|---|
| Nasal | | m | | | | n | | | (ŋ) | |
| Stop | p | b | t | d | | | | k | ɡ | |
| Affricate | | | | | t͡s | d͡z (Note: Boutkan (2001) considers these to have been the palatal affricates /c͡ç/ and /ɟ͡ʝ/, respectively, before developing into affricates, though it is uncertain when this change fully occurred.) | | | | |
| Fricative | f | (v) | θ | (ð) | s | (z) | | x | (ɣ) | (h) |
| Approximant | | | | | | | j | | w | |
| Liquid | | | | | r | l | | | | |

Gemination, or the long pronunciation of consonants, was possible for most consonants in word-medial position, (Note: Boutkan (2001) finds evidence for word-final geminates lacking, but concedes this may be the result of orthographic convention rather than a strict phonological feature.) though semivowels (i.e., /w/ and /j/), voiced allophones of voiceless fricatives typically found between vowels (i.e., /v/, /ð/, /z/, and /ɣ/), and the alveolar affricates were exceptions. The Dutch linguist Dirk Boutkan argues that /f/ was an exception as well, but Bremmer includes it. (Note: Boutkan (2001) also excludes /x/, but appears to contradict himself elsewhere in the same work.) In earlier orthographies, geminate consonants were consistently written with duplicated consonants unless they were found in word-final position; later, the duplication only signified that the previous vowel was short.

The phoneme /x/ was typically pronounced at the beginning of a syllable as [h] if the syllable was stressed and the phoneme occurred before a vowel, /l/, /r/, or /w/. It is possible that /xl/, /xr/, or /xw/ clusters were realized as the voiceless allophones [l̥], [r̥], or [ʍ], respectively, given that the orthography sometimes swaps them; for example, hl- and lh- are both attested for the same sequence. If true, Old Frisian is unique in its preservation of these voiceless liquid consonants among other contemporary Germanic languages. In all other cases, [x] is believed to have been pronounced. The phoneme /g/ was devoiced and spirantized in word-final position; in other words, it became [x] as well.

==== Orthographic conventions ====
The dental fricatives /θ/ and /ð/ were both written as ⟨th⟩, irrespective of voicing; the phoneme /t/ was sometimes written as ⟨th⟩, but no pronunciation change is thought to have occurred. Similarly, the /sk/ cluster was sometimes written as ⟨sch⟩, but it was still likely pronounced as [sk]. Though ⟨kh⟩ was often pronounced [k], ⟨ch⟩ could represent either /x/ or /k/, though /k/ is vastly less common except in loans from Medieval Latin, where it could also represent /x/, especially word-initially or before ⟨t⟩. (Note: The use of ⟨kh⟩ was rare in Old Frisian, but is attested in forms like khinda, the genitive form of 'children'.) Instead, ⟨ch⟩ almost always represented either /x/ or its geminate equivalent. The insertion of ⟨h⟩ was probably imported from orthographic conventions common among Middle Low German scribes, though it was relatively rare and found primarily in Latin loans.

The digraph gh was often used to represent [ɣ], the fricative allophone of /g/ or voiced allophone of /x/, but could represent /g/ as well. The semivowel /j/ could be variously represented as ⟨i⟩, ⟨y⟩, ⟨j⟩, or ⟨g⟩, though the latter only occurred before high vowels. Both ⟨g⟩ and ⟨h⟩ could be used unetymologically to mark syllable boundaries; ⟨g⟩ typically used for [j], as in wīges (genitive singular of 'way') instead of the also attested wīes, while ⟨h⟩ was silent, as in israhelisk ('Israeli'). The digraph ⟨qu⟩ was sometimes used for the sequence [kw]; both quic and kuic ('animal'), both pronounced [kwik], are attested in the corpora. The sound [v] could be represented with either ⟨v⟩ or ⟨u⟩. In the Codex Unia, a document found west of the Lauwers, the language shows signs of voicing in word-initial fricatives like that found in Middle and Modern Dutch, though this does not persist in Modern West Frisian.

=== Dialectal variation ===
Old Frisian phonology was not uniform. For example, around the year 1200, the Proto–West Germanic phoneme *þ became /d/ in word-medial and word-final positions in several Old Frisian dialects. (Note: Old West Frisian also demonstrates word-initial [d] from an earlier *þ, such as in Old West Frisian dis instead of this ('this').) This change did not affect Old Weser Frisian or North Frisian and forms like lathia existed beside ladia in different dialects during the same period.

==== Old Weser Frisian ====
Short vowels in unstressed final syllables in Old Weser Frisian were in complementary distribution; this distribution is called "vowel balance". When the preceding vowel was short and the introduction of vowel balance would cause the additional short vowel to be in an open syllable, i or u appear, such as in Godi ('to God') or skipu ('ships'). If the preceding vowel was long or a diphthong, or if the stem vowel was separated by another syllable, the word ended with the vowels e or o, such as in liōde ('people'). This regular distribution of word-final vowels has allowed linguists to differentiate between long and short vowels in Old Frisian documents where vowel length is not marked. For example, the word hōve (dative singular of 'hoof'), with a long first vowel, could be distinguished from its short vowel counterpart hovi (dative singular of 'court, courtyard'). The consequences of vowel balance are reflected in two of the descendant dialects, Wangerooge and Wursten.

Old Weser Frisian also raised e to i before r (irthe, 'earth') and raised a and u to i through i-mutation (kining, 'king'). However, i was lowered to e and u to o in open syllables if the following syllable contains a. This last process is known as the Riustring a-mutation. Following fronting and the palatalization of *-ag- and *-eg, which typically became ei, Old Weser Frisian exhibits ī, such as in dī ('day') instead of dei and brīn ('brain') instead of brein. Proto-Germanic *ē₂ also became ī.

==== Old Ems Frisian ====
Old Ems Frisian diphthongized ē to ei before a voiced alveolar consonant including resonants, as in breid ('bride', also 'broad'). In unstressed syllables, the suffix -en inserted r between the vowel and the final consonant, such as in wēpern ('weapon') instead of wēpen. In later forms of the dialect, a became lengthened after some consonant clusters; ā then had a tendency to become rounded to ō ([ɔː]) irrespective of if it had been lengthened by the consonant cluster lengthening. This gave rise to forms such as ōlle ('all') instead of alle, though forms like ōlsa ('so') – against the non-Ems form alsā – show rounding but not in both circumstances.

==== Old West Frisian ====
Orthographic conventions used in Old West Frisian help to make the phonological structure much clearer than those of the Old East Frisian dialects. Vowel length was frequently marked, either with the addition of an ⟨e⟩ after the long vowel, as in boek ('book'), or the duplication of the long vowel, as in huus ('house') or wiif ('woman'). Orthographic duplication of long u was sometimes ⟨uu⟩ and sometimes ⟨w⟩, as in hws. Similarly, a long i may sometimes be represented as ⟨ij⟩, as in sijn ('his'), or ⟨y⟩, as in lyf ('wergeld'). In some instances, ⟨y⟩ or ⟨i⟩ could be used as a length modifier as well, as in teyken ('sign') or kuith ('known, public').

Old West Frisian demonstrated rounding of *a before nasal consonants; this was later constrained to the northeastern dialect before -mn or -nn, as the southwestern dialect restored it to a. When v occurred between vowels, it became w, as in howe instead of hove for the dative singular of 'court'; this also sometimes led to the collapse of the two-vowel structure, causing a diphthong to occur, as in hāud ('head'; from earlier hāwed inherited from hāved). This sound change is also found in later forms of the Old East Frisian dialects.

Old West Frisian also exhibited several vowel breaking processes. One is a process called Jorwert breaking where long front vowels followed by w were converted into rising diphthongs. This means that [iːw], [eːw], and [ɛːw] were converted into [juːw], [joːw], and [jɔːw], respectively. Sometimes the j was deleted if it followed an r. Before consonant clusters beginning with a liquid consonant, e was typically raised to i. In another process, called "late Old West Frisian breaking", consonant clusters where l preceded d, k, n, or r, the preceding e lengthened and then became diphthongized; afterward, stress shifted to the second syllable. This process can be seen in examples such as feld lengthening to fēld before breaking into fiēld; stress originally fell on the first syllable, then shifted to the final syllable. Before the cluster nd, e diphthongized to ei. In the sequence -we-, both elements merged into -o-. The diphthong iā raised to iē, pronounced as [jɛː]. The voiceless dental fricative th became t word-initially and the voiced dental fricative, also represented as th, became d word-initially and -medially. Between vowels, d – including those previously dental fricatives – are elided, as in snīa ('to cut'; from earlier snītha). Word-final d was devoiced and u was raised to o before nasal consonants.

== Morphology ==
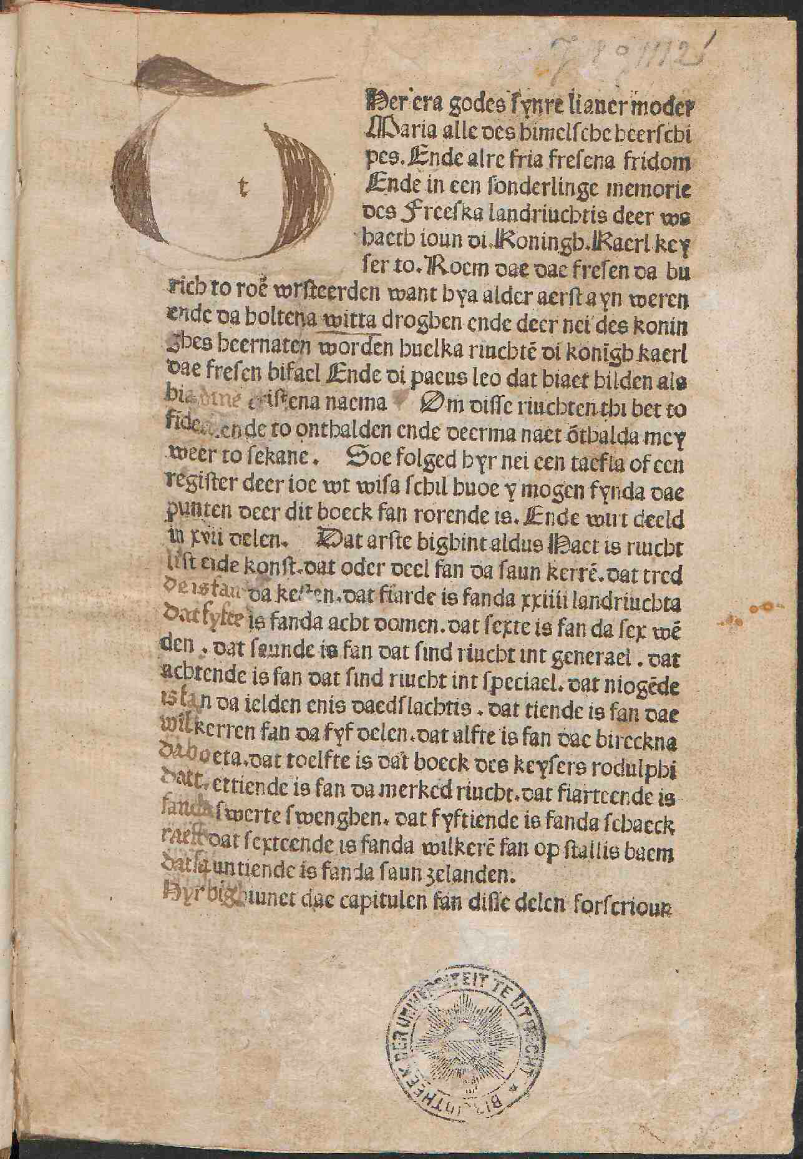
The Freeska Landriucht (copy shown dated to c. 1485) is a medieval document with Latin and Old Frisian law texts. (Note: Although this corpus of legal texts is referred to as "Old Frisian law texts", at least seven of the texts predate the Old Frisian period.)

Old Frisian distinguished between three grammatical genders: masculine, feminine, and neuter. Case appears to have been somewhat variable; while nominative, accusative, genitive, and dative cases are robustly attested, the instrumental case was preserved in some fossilized phrases and a locative case has been documented in a few attestations. Only two grammatical numbers are attested in Old Frisian (singular and plural), though a dual number is attested in both Insular and Mainland forms of North Frisian, becoming obsolete during the early 20th century. Old Frisian likely had a dual number, but the legal context in which most attestations occur did not give cause for the use of the dual. Old Frisian did not have reflexive pronouns for most of its history; although the inherited Germanic reflexive sīn is attested, it displaced the expected neuter genitive singular pronoun *his and the language instead used the accusative case to express the reflexive grammatical function.

=== Pronouns ===
Pronouns in Old Frisian are only attested in four cases: nominative, accusative, genitive, and dative. Like other Ingvaeonic languages such as Old English and Old Saxon, there was no distinction between the accusative and dative, which was contrasted with other West Germanic languages like Old High German.

First- and second-person pronouns
| | First person | | Second person | |
| | Singular | Plural | Singular | Plural |
|---|---|---|---|---|
| Nominative | ik | wī | thū | jī, ī, gī |
| Accusative | mī | ūs | thī | iu, io |
| Genitive | mīn | ūser | thīn | iuwer |
| Dative | mī | ūs | thī | iu, io |

Old West Frisian innovated the second-person plural form iemman, sometimes rendered as iemma, a combined form composed of jī and man (literally 'you men'). This form did not decline for case and jī remained the polite form of address. Old Frisian had cliticized pronouns which were attached to the end of words; their use has made translation more difficult since they were not marked as distinct from other homonymic suffixes. Possessive pronouns declined like strong adjectives and interrogative pronouns did not decline for grammatical gender. The interrogative pronoun hwet ('what') was sometimes marked for number, but only in the accusative and dative forms. The interrogative pronoun hwa ('who') was typically pronounced with a short vowel, but pronounced long utterance-finally.

Pronominal forms were sometimes used to recapitulate nouns and other pronouns to establish clarity. Examples include:

Thi blata thi is lethost allera nata.
that {poor man} that is {most miserable} all-GEN-PL companion-GEN-PL
'The poor man, he is the most miserable of all companions.'

=== Nouns ===
Old Frisian nouns are classified into three archetypes. Type I are weak/consonant-stemmed nouns, type II are strong/vowel-stemmed nouns, and type III is a catch-all category which mainly comprises other kinds of consonant-stemmed nouns of which the Indo-European reflex had the case marked immediately to the root word. Masculine words ending in -a and feminine or neuter words ending in -e are classed in type I, though there were only two neuter words in this type: āre ('ear') and āge ('eye'). Type II comprises a wide variety of strong masculine nouns and predominately abstract feminine nouns. The neuter suffix -skipi or -skipe also governs the type II paradigm, though this is attested as a feminine suffix as well. Below is an example of an n-stem declension, a kind of type I declension pattern:

n-stem declension
| | Masculine | | Feminine | | Neuter | |
| | skelta 'bailiff' | | tunge 'tongue' | | āge 'eye' | |
| | Singular | Plural | Singular | Plural | Singular | Plural |
|---|---|---|---|---|---|---|
| Nominative | skelta | skelta | tunge | tunga | āge | āgne |
| Accusative | skelta | skelta | tunga | tunga | āge | āgne |
| Genitive | skelta | skeltena | tunga | tungena | āga | āgena |
| Dative | skelta | skeltum | tunga | tungum | āga | āgum |

Heavy syllables in the stem – that is, stems with either a long vowel or a word-final consonant – had an influence on the pattern of type II declensions. Traditionally ending in -u, heavy a-stems lost the pluralizing suffix, making the nominative and accusative forms of the plural identical to the singular. Below are examples of a-stem declensions within the type II paradigm:

a-stem declension
| | Masculine | | Neuter | | Neuter (heavy) | |
| | bām 'tree' | | skip 'boat' | | word 'word' | |
| | Singular | Plural | Singular | Plural | Singular | Plural |
|---|---|---|---|---|---|---|
| Nominative | bām | bāmar | skip | skipe | word | |
| Accusative | bām | bāmar | skip | skipe | word | |
| Genitive | bāmes | bāma | skipes | skipa | wordes | worda |
| Dative | bāme | bāmum | skipe | skipum | worde | wordum |

Certain words had irregular plurals due to phonological processes, such as dei ('day') and degar ('days') which developed based on vowel fronting and velar palatalization in the former but not in the latter. These irregularities do not affect its paradigm classification.

All nouns in the ō-stem declension were feminine. The nominative singular -e in these terms comes from an originally accusative form. Below is an example of the ō-stem paradigm:

ō-stem declension
| | Feminine | | | |
| | ieve 'gift' | | wunde 'wound' | |
| | Singular | Plural | Singular | Plural |
|---|---|---|---|---|
| Nominative | ieve | ieva | wunde | wunda |
| Accusative | ieve | ieva | wunde | wunda |
| Genitive | ieve | ieva | wunde | wunda |
| Dative | ieve | ievum | wunde | wundum |

=== Verbs ===
Verbs in Old Frisian comprised four types: strong, weak, preterite-present, and anomalous. With few exceptions, the only productive verb declension was the weak paradigm. Some paradigm leveling to weak declensions occurred among strong verbs in later forms of the language. The anomalous class of verbs are a composite class comprising suppletive verbs, verbs without clear preterite forms, and verbs with defective or missing declension forms.

In general, verbs tended to end in either -a or -ia with later forms reduced to -e or -ie, respectively. Noteworthy exceptions include gān and stān in Old West Frisian; this word-final -n became more widespread in monosyllabic verbs in later forms of that dialect, such as in dwān ('to do') and siān ('to see'). Infinitive forms used the lengthened suffix -ane after the word tō – used to express purpose – such as in the phrase tō farane ('to travel'). In Old Weser Frisian and Old Ems Frisian, present participles and gerunds had identical forms. Like modern English, the conjunction thet ('that') was sometimes omitted after verbs of expression in some contexts (Tha spreken se hia ne kuden. 'Then they said [that] they were unable to.').

==== Strong verbs ====
The infinitive, the first- and third-person singular preterite, the plural preterite, and the past participle are the four constituent parts identifying a strong verb. These verbs are defined by their use of vowel gradation – including changes to vowel quality or length – to signal a change in meaning, such as person or tense. Like nominal declensions, phonological explanations for irregularity are present and similarly do not change classification. There were six classes of strong verbs in Old Frisian with a seventh catch-all category. Classes IV and V became functionally identical after i-mutation, a morphophonological change which obfuscated the differentiation between the historical *i and *u in some contexts, and are distinguished only by historical provenance. Examples of verbal paradigms can be seen below:

Verb classes
| | Gloss | Infinitive | Third-person singular present | Preterite | | Past participle |
| | Gloss | Infinitive | Third-person singular present | Singular | Plural | Past participle |
|---|---|---|---|---|---|---|
| Class I | 'to seize' | grīpa | gripth | grēp | gripen | |
| Class II | 'to offer' | biāda | biuth | bād | beden | |
| Class III | 'to help' | helpa | helpth | halp | hulpen | |
| Class IV | 'to order' | bifela | bifelth | bifel | bifēlen | bifelen |
| Class V | 'to read' | lesa | lesth | les | lēsen | lessen |
| Class VI | 'to go' | fara | ferth | fōr | fōren | faren |
| Class VII | 'to sleep' | slēpa | slept | slēp | | slēpen |

==== Weak verbs ====
Unique to Old Frisian, there were only two weak verb classes; Gothic had twice as many, while Old Norse, Old English, Old Saxon, and Old High German each had three. Class I weak verbs comprised verbs which originally had a suffix, *-jan, which created causative verbs from strong verb stems and factitive verbs from nouns and adjectives, such as dēma ('to judge') from dōm ('judgement'). Morphophonologically, the *j affected consonants through assibilation and the vowels through mutation. Class I weak verbs have the past tense suffix -de, or -te after voiceless consonants. Geminated consonants became singletons in the preterite and past participles. By contrast, class II weak verbs are typically those which end in -ia. These verbs had their past tense marked by the deletion of the i and the addition of the suffix -ade; the past participle was formed with the same deletion and a simple -ad suffix. Later forms of the suffixes were -ede and -ed, respectively. In late Old West Frisian, these past tense suffixes were deleted. Class II has remained productive into the modern period; Frisian is the only branch of West Germanic languages to have preserved this class of verbs.

==== Preterite-present ====
Germanic languages have a verb class in which a form resembling a past-tense strong verb supplies the present-tense meaning while the past-tense form is re-formed with a weak verbal suffix; infinitive forms are also formed through innovation. These verbs exhibit expected vowel alternations for strong verbs for some forms while other forms are in line with expected weak verb declensions. In Old Frisian, they are categorized into one of the six strong verb classes the strong verb form is derived from.

== Syntax ==
=== Case ===
Case did not vary much in Old Frisian when compared to other contemporary Germanic languages. The nominative case was used for the subjects or subject complements though it was also used in vocative contexts. While the main use of the accusative was to mark the direct object of a verb, it was also used in temporal and spatial expressions, such as mentioning spaces of time (niugen monath, 'nine months') or distances (Hi gunge tha niugen heta skera. 'He should walk the nine hot plowshares.'). Genitive usage was complex and multifaceted; it marked possession and relationships, but was also used to mark adverbs and had both partitive and numerical functions including measures (tha wi sigun hundred folkes santon, 'when we sent seven hundred [armed] men') and counting (thritich fethma, 'thirty fathoms').

The dative case was also complex. Although it marked the indirect object of a ditransitive verb, it was sometimes used for the direct objects of transitive verbs, such as helpa ('to help'). The dative shared some overlap in function with the genitive, including its use in adverbial phrases and measurements. Dative constructions were also used to mark the benefactive, such as in the sentence God him reste ('God rested [for himself]'). A number of adjectives governed the dative as well, typically marking either physical or emotional closeness.

As the case system began to break down in Old Frisian, authors – especially those of legal documents – came to rely heavily on word order and changed the use of prepositions. By late Old Frisian, case marking was optional.

=== Verbs ===
Old Frisian marked for two tenses in the verbal root: simple present and simple past, also called the simple preterite. All other tenses, called compound tenses, were expressed through periphrasis using auxiliary verbs. While these tenses were not common in earlier forms of the language, they became more popular over time.

Compound tenses used the auxiliaries meaning 'to have' (hebba in Old East Frisian, habba in Old West Frisian) and 'to be' (wesa). The use of hebba/habba and the past participle were used to express the past perfective and less commonly the pluperfect. These usages were largely constrained to dependent clauses. The use of wesa is less clear, but it appears to have been used as somewhat of a present progressive when in combination with a present participle. It is often difficult to differentiate between a progressive semantic meaning or a copular relationship. Particularly with verbs of motion, wesa was also used in some intransitive contexts to express the perfect or pluperfect to express changes in state. The perfect of wesa was used with hebba/habba, though this was uncommon in earlier forms of the language.

The passive voice was typically constructed with the verb wertha ('to become') and the past participle, though wesa and the past participle could be used to form a perfective passive. The combined use of wesa and the present participle were used for the durative aspect, while the future tense used the combination of the auxiliary skela and the infinitive. Non-auxiliary verbs, such as biginna ('to begin') and gunga ('to go'), were used with the infinitive to express an inchoative aspect. Similarly, verbs like dwā ('to do') and lēta ('to let') were used to form the causative.

The language also marked for three moods in the root: indicative for statements of fact or observations, subjunctive for subjective thoughts including guesswork and conjecture, and imperative for commands. The indicative and subjunctive moods may be used next to each other in different clauses of the same sentence. The infinitive was used in several ways, but the inflected infinitive – an infinitive preceded by tō – operated as a gerund. This inflected form was used to express purpose and sentences containing it would often drop the subject and the associated finite verb. A unique construction using the uninflected infinitive, called the accusative-plus-infinitive construction, was sometimes used as a complement, as in tha segen hia anne thretundista sitta ('then they saw sitting a thirteenth [man]').

=== Word order ===
Word order in Old Frisian varied widely depending on context and function. The language's constituent word order is generally described as subject–object–verb (SOV). Dependent clauses strongly tend towards this word order as well, though some departures from this trend are attested. However, analysis of the existing corpora involving charter documents shows that about 60% of dependent sentences with direct objects had a subject–verb–object (SVO) construction. Object–verb–subject (OVS) constructions were commonly employed as a method of topicalization, wherein the object of the sentence was emphasized over elements of the sentence. Both conditional and interrogative clauses were typically verb–subject–object (VSO). Dependent conditional clauses used object–subject–verb (OSV) constructions as well when interrogative pronouns are in grammatical cases other than the nominative.

In contexts using a case other than the nominative, pronouns could be moved between the verb and the subject when the subject was in a later position than the verb, leading to a verb–object–subject (VOS) word order. This word order is completely absent in modern Frisian. Examples of this include the following:

tha het se thi koning alle heran
then called them the king all lords
'then the king called them all lords'

Like all other Germanic languages at some point in their history, Old Frisian exhibited properties of verb-second word order (V2), though its application was inconsistent. This means that the verb appears in the second position in independent clauses with a finite verb, but reverts to verb-final word order in subordinate clauses.

Old Frisian sentences almost always required a subject and the language often employed the use of dummy subjects. This appears to be a syntactic necessity even when there was no semantic function. Examples include verbs involving the weather and impersonal passives, respectively demonstrated below:

hwant hit wayt ende stormit alle daghen
for it blows and storms all days
'for it blows and storms all days'

hwersar fuchten is in tha godes huse
{when there} fought is in the god-GEN house
'when there has been fought in the house of God'

=== Negation ===
In Old Frisian, negative sentences could be derived from the simple addition of a negative element, such as naet ('not') or nimmen ('nobody'), or double negative constructions. While there was a preference in the language for double negatives, all three stages of Jespersen's cycle are present in the existing corpora, though neither of the two Rüstringer codices – the two oldest codices – exhibit the last stage. The negative marker ne preceded the finite verb in both kinds of constructions. Examples include:

truch thet hia ne mughen cuma
through that they NEG may come
'through that, they may not come'

thet hi ter nauuet cuma ne machte
that he there not come NEG might
'that he might not come there'

The negative marker ne often cliticized to the following auxiliary, such as in nabba ('to not have'; from ne + habba) and nis ('is not'; from ne + is). In sentences where the finite verb was elided, the negative marker was also elided and no words or any affixes could come between them. For these reasons, the negative marker and the verb are seen as a unified syntactic unit, with ne serving the function of a syntactic clitic. This was not the case for other negative elements, such as naet, which could be divided by other syntactic functions. Contrastive examples of this are demonstrated below, both from the Skeltana Riucht:

dat hi dine kempa winna ne mey
that he the champion defeat NEG may
'that he may not defeat the champion'

ief hi dine kempa naet winna mey
if he the champion not defeat may
'if he may not defeat the champion'

In sentences where the only verb was a finite verb in a main clause, the use of naet was mostly restricted to the sentence-final position, but in subordinate clauses with double negatives, naet was promoted to the position before ne.

== See also ==
- Asegabok – Medieval Frisian legal manuscript and the content of the First Riustring Codex
- De itinere Frisonum – Eyewitness account of 13th-century Frisian crusaders
- Finnesburg Fragment – Old English poem probably about a war between the Frisians and the Danes
- Frisian freedom – Absence of feudalism in medieval Frisia
- Frisian involvement in the Crusades
- Frisian Islands – Archipelago in the Wadden Sea
- Great Frisian War – 15th-century war in Frisia
- Gysbert Japiks – West Frisian poet (1603–1666)
- Imperativus pro infinitivo – Syntactic feature of a verb in the Frisian languages
- Kestigia – Old Frisian legal concept
- Lex Frisionum – 9th-century Frisian legal code
- Pier Gerlofs Donia – Frisian warrior, pirate, and rebel (1480–1520)
- Saxon feud – 1514–1517 war fought in the Low Countries
- Westeremden yew-stick – Pre–Old Frisian runic inscription
