= Isaak van den Blocke =

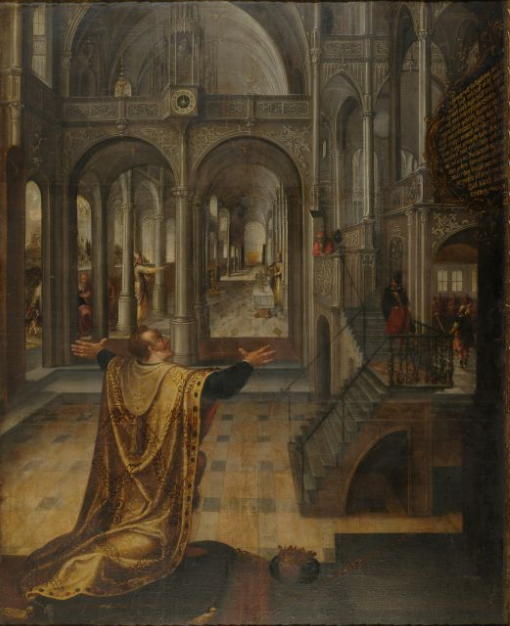
Solomon praying in the temple

Izaak van den Blocke or Isaak van den Blocke (1574–1626) was a painter of Flemish descent who spent his active career in Poland. He is known for his decorative paintings in various official buildings and residences in Gdańsk. He also completed commissions for churches and painted facades. He was in 1612 one of the founders of the painters' guild of Gdańsk.

== Life ==
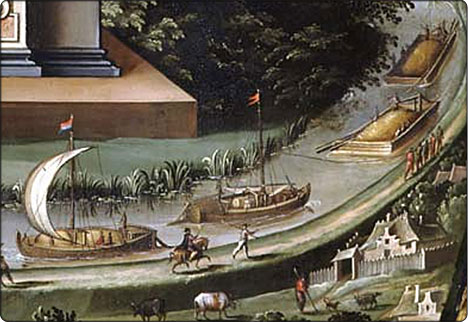
Vistula grain transport, detail of the Apotheosis of Danzig

The details about his early life are scarce. Sources identify his place of birth either as Mechelen in the Southern Netherlands or Königsberg (then in Prussia and today Kaliningrad in Russia). His father was Willem van den Blocke, a Flemish sculptor and architect who had trained with Cornelis Floris in Antwerp. His brother Abraham van den Blocke was an architect and sculptor and his brothers Jacob and David were painters.

In 1584 the family moved to Danzig (modern Gdańsk, Poland). Here he likely received training by or worked in the workshop of Paul Vredeman de Vries and his father Hans Vredeman de Vries. He was in 1612 one of the founders of the painters' guild of Gdańsk.

He was the teacher of Laurence Neter.

Van den Blocke died in Danzig around the same time as his father and brother Abraham, likely from an infectious disease.

== Work ==
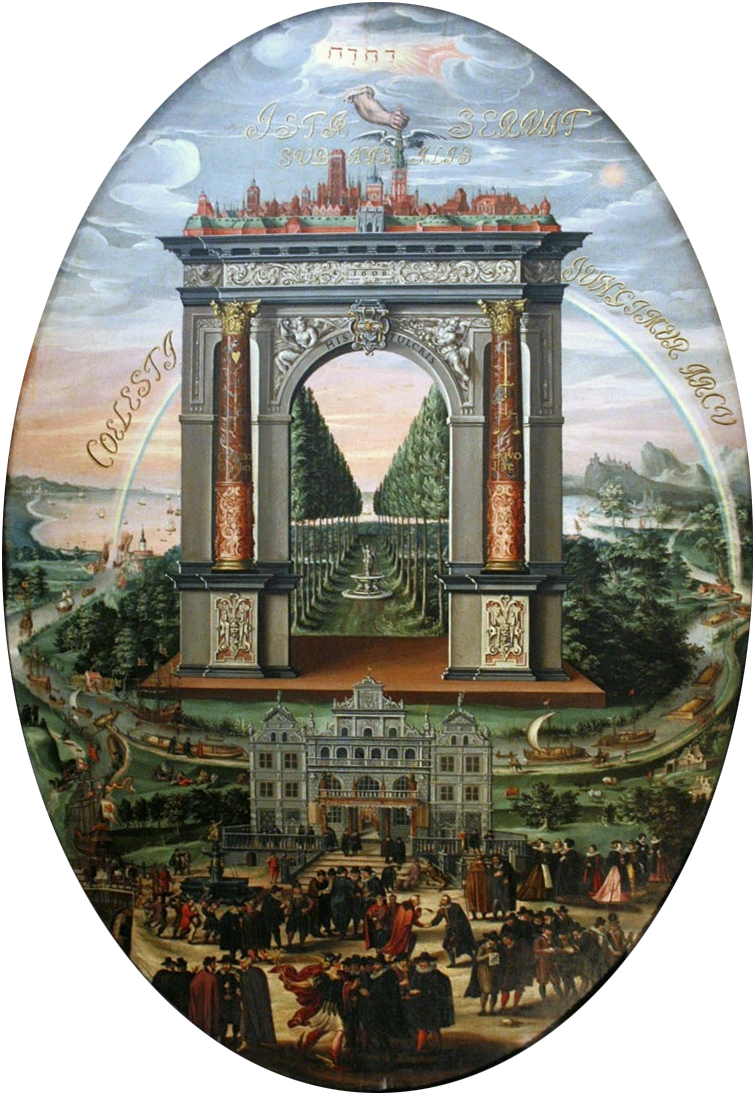
Apotheosis of Danzig, detail

He was strongly influenced by the Northern Mannerism and the perspectival paintings of his presumed teachers Hans and Paul Vredeman de Vries. He drew his inspiration mainly from the Bible and mythology as well as contemporary subjects.

His principal work is the decoration of the ceiling (completed 1608) of the Great Chamber of the former main town hall in Danzig. This work was composed of 25 oil paintings on oak panels, with a central composition, an allegory to the glorious trade of Danzig (Apotheosis of Danzig). He also made paintings for the winter council room of the town hall (1611-1614).

He is thought to have painted the altarpiece of Tērvete church (nowadays Latvia) in 1614.

He received regular commissions from the city council, including figure paintings and the polychroming of buildings. He completed several assignments for churches in Danzig including the main altar of St Catherine's Church (together with Anton Möller).

The Germanisches Nationalmuseum in Nuremberg, Germany holds a nine-part ceiling painting, which is permanently installed in a ceiling in one of its rooms. It shows allegorical and biblical scenes in three rows of three pictures. Their interpretation is not always clear. Whether the arrangement in the museum reflects the original one remains open. Van Blocke likely created the ceiling for a room in Danzig City Hall. It confirms the popularity of inventive emblematic iconographic programs in Danzig. Some scenes are based on prints by Netherlandish masters. Some of the depictions can be interpreted easily. For example, the scene with Minerva standing behind a man holding a compass personifies the liberal arts. Other paintings in the programme are less obvious.
