= Middle Frisian =

Historical form of Frisian

- Region: Netherlands, Germany, Southern Denmark
- Era: 1550–1800
- Language family: Indo-European: Germanic; West Germanic; North Sea Germanic; Anglo–Frisian; Frisian; Middle Frisian
- Early form: Old Frisian
- Writing system: Latin

Language codes
- ISO 639-3: –
- Glottolog: None

Middle Frisian was a language that evolved from Old Frisian around the year 1550 and was spoken until 1800.

Up until the 15th century Old Frisian was a language widely spoken and written in what are now the northern Netherlands and north-western Germany, but from 1500 onwards it became an almost exclusively oral language, mainly used in rural areas. This was in part due to the occupation of its stronghold, the Dutch province of Friesland (Fryslân), in 1498 – when Duke Albert III, Duke of Saxony, replaced Frisian as the language of government with Dutch. As late as 1599, the London dramatist Thomas Dekker could introduce whole scenes in the mixed Frisian-Dutch argot of the coast in The Shoemaker's Holiday, in confidence that his English-speaking audience could follow it.

Afterwards this practice was continued under the Habsburg rulers of the Netherlands (the German Emperor Charles V and his son, the Spanish King Philip II), and even when the Netherlands became independent, in 1585, Frisian did not regain its former status. The reason for this was the rise of Holland as the dominant part of the Netherlands, and its language, Dutch, as the dominant language in judicial, administrative and religious affairs.

In this period the great Frisian poet Gysbert Japix (1603–1666), a schoolmaster and cantor from the city of Boalsert, seen as the father of modern West Frisian literature and spelling, was an exception to the trend. His example was not followed until the 19th century, when new generations of West Frisian authors and poets appeared.

This coincided with the introduction of the so-called newer breaking system, a prominent grammatical feature in almost all West Frisian dialects, with the notable exception of Súdwesthoeksk. Therefore, the Modern Frisian period is considered to have begun at this point in time, around 1820.

== See also ==
- Old Frisian
- Middle Dutch
- Languages of the Netherlands
