= Kestigia =

Old Frisian legal concept

Kestigia (also kestigie, kestighie, or kestigade) is a verb mentioned in Old Frisian texts. It was a legal process in which a defendant had to prove his innocence by providing an oath. The historian R. P. Cleveringa calls it a 'technical evidence law concept'. The texts in which the term is found dated between the twelfth, thirteenth and fourteenth centuries. The term is an Old High German loanward (kestigata, punishment), and has the same root as English chastise or castigate.
