= Salomon Vredeman de Vries =

Salomon Vredeman de Vries (1556 in Mechelen – 1604 in The Hague), was a Flemish painter and draughtsman who specialised in architectural paintings.

== Life ==
He was the eldest son of the Dutch-born architect, painter and engineer Hans Vredeman de Vries. His father was at the time of Salomon's birth residing in Mechelen, from which he would flee to Antwerp in 1564 to escape the Inquisition. He trained with his father. It is believed he lived in The Hague at the end of his life as this is the place where he died.

== Work ==
His father was as a painter interested in perspective and therefore he painted mainly architectural paintings. He passed this skill and interest on to his son Salomon who painted almost exclusively architecture paintings. Little more is known of the works of Salomon. He is known to have collaborated with his father and younger brother Paul Vredeman de Vries in the completion of commissions.

In 1602 he obtained the commission to work on the decoration of the organ of the Dom Tower of Utrecht. Together with Adam Willaerts he signed on 14 August of that year the contract for this commission. The contract specified that the interiors of the organ shutters had to represent a ‘church in perspective’, life-size figures of David with his harp and Saint Cecilia with an organ. The exterior of the organ case had to be decorated with painted grotesques, which was a specialty of the Vredeman de Vries workshop. It is not entirely clear which parts of the commission were to be executed by Salomon and this contract also does not shed any light on the question as to whether he was at that time residing in Utrecht.
