= Vereniging voor Vreemdelingenverkeer =

Dutch organization for tourism and recreation

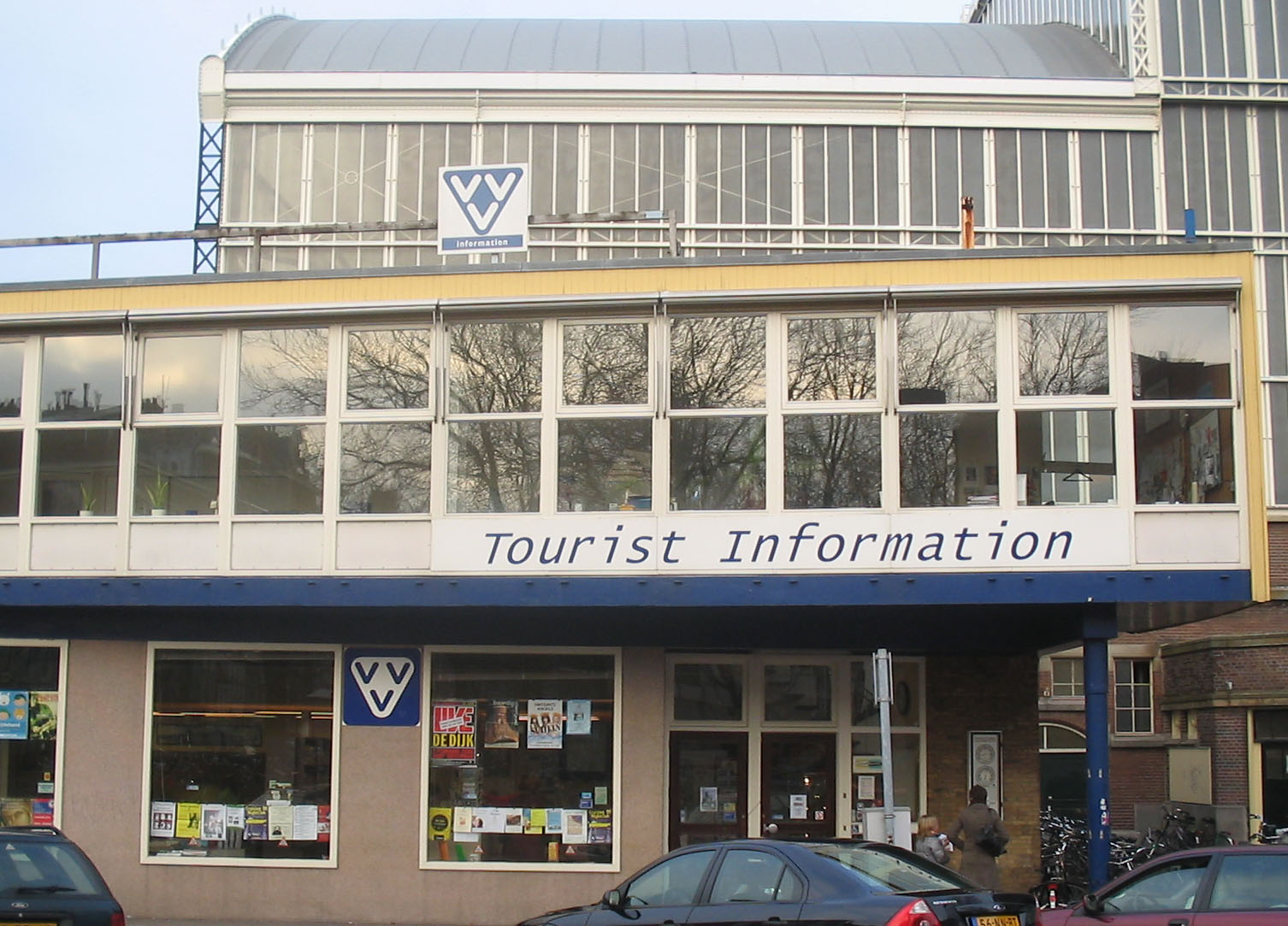
Former VVV office in Haarlem

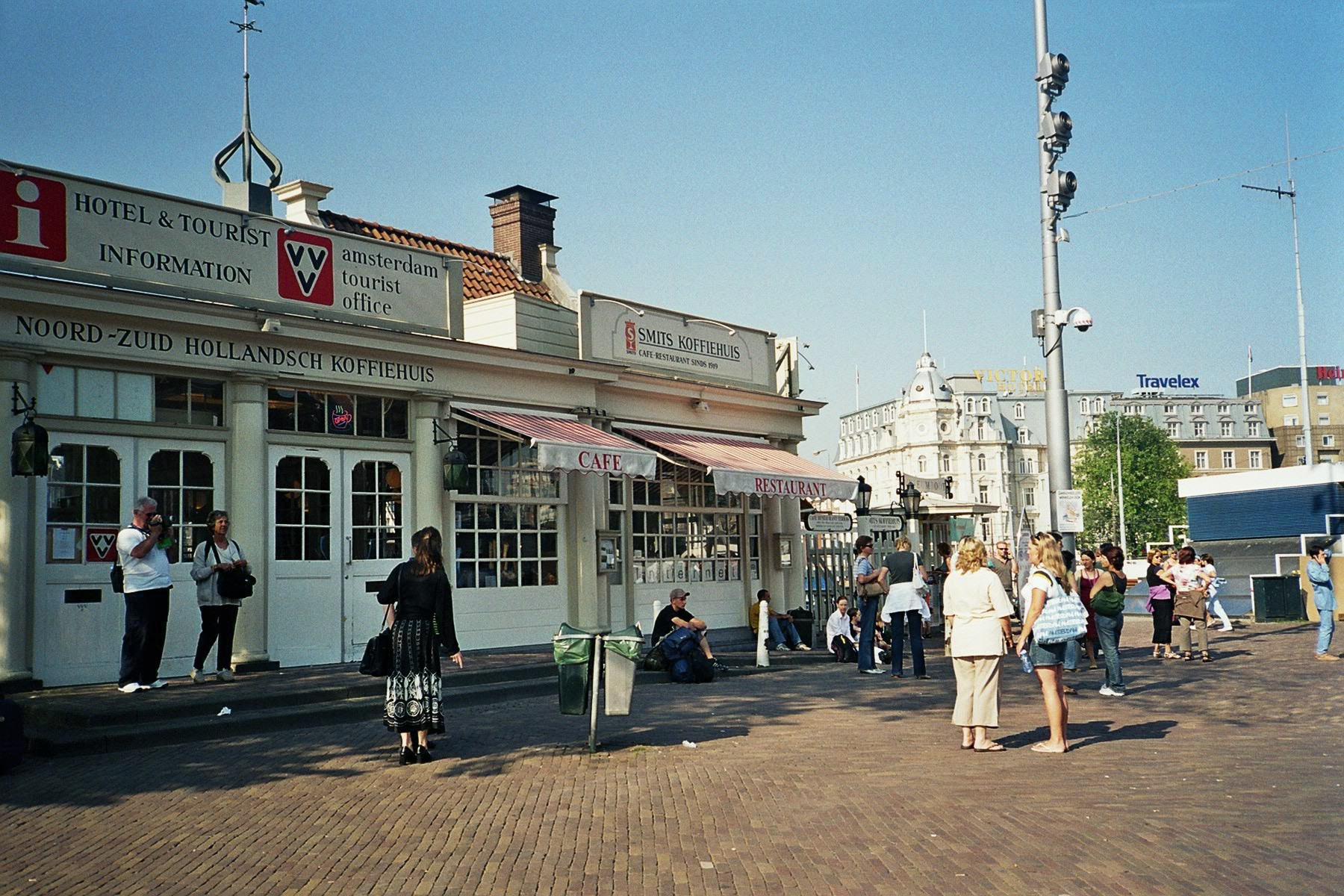
The Noord-Zuid-Hollands Koffiehuis opposite Amsterdam Centraal Station which houses a VVV

The Vereniging voor Vreemdelingenverkeer (Dutch pronunciation: [vəˈreːnəˌɣɪŋ voːr ˈvreːmdəlɪŋə(n)vərˌkeːr] VVV; "Association for Tourism") is an organization in the Netherlands in which local or regional leisure companies and organizations work together to promote tourism. The tourist offices provide visitors with information about the local city or region and assist in the reservation of overnight stays and the booking of activities. In addition, they try to further develop tourism. Vereniging voor Vreemdelingenverkeer roughly translates as the Association for Tourist Traffic.

The VVV’s income comes from the sale of items such as maps, guides, gift cards and souvenirs. In addition, the participating leisure companies and the municipalities represented, contribute financially to the tourist information activities.

In the Netherlands, individual VVVs are coordinated by VVV Nederland, which functions as a licenser of the VVV brand. In 2017, the Kennisnetwerk Destinatie Nederland was founded, this is a network of 80 Destination and City Marketing organizations.

== See also ==
- Tourism in the Netherlands
