= Matthijs Harings =

Dutch Golden Age portrait painter

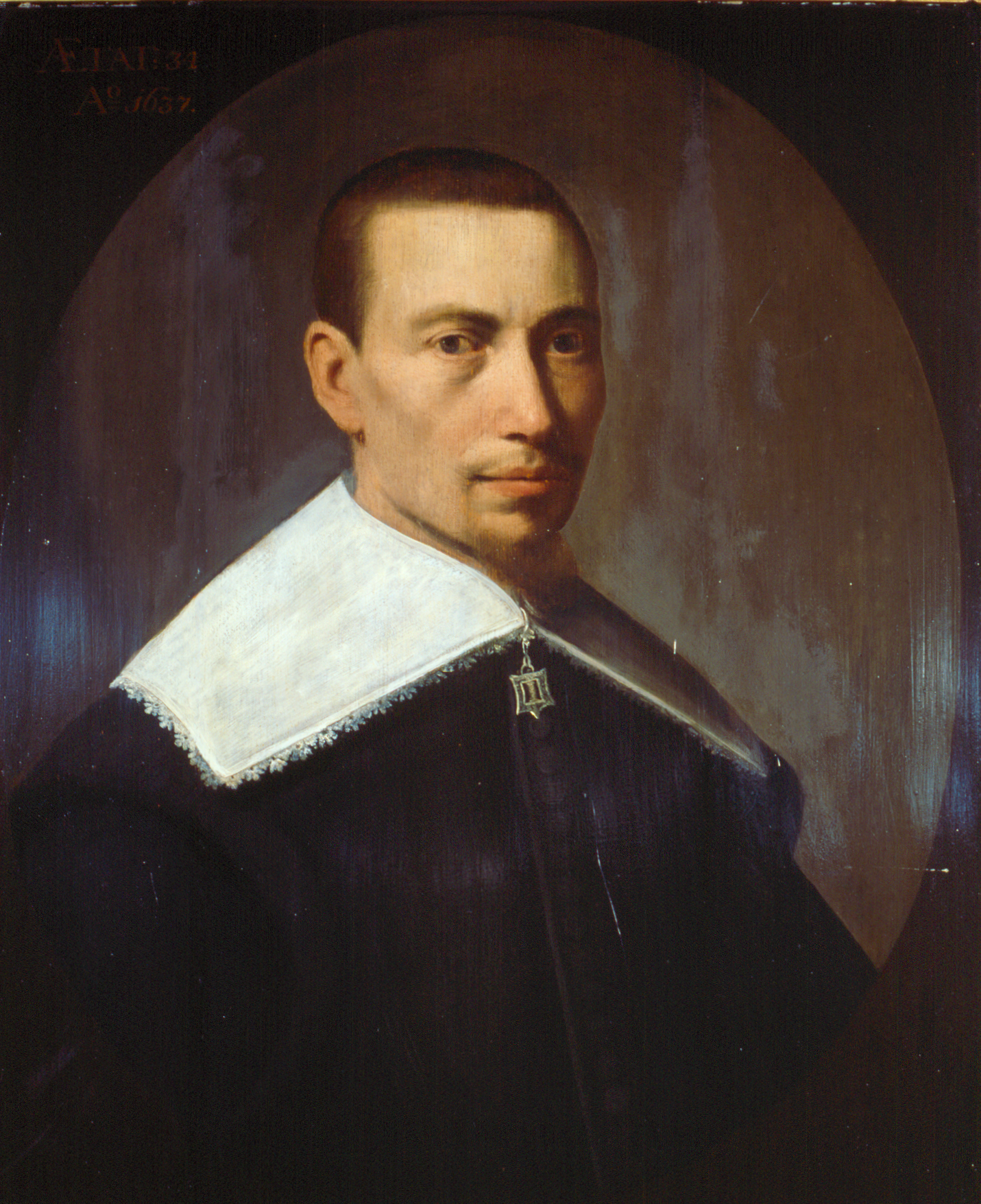
Portrait of Gysbert Japiks, 1646

Matthijs Harings (1593 in Leeuwarden – 1667 in Leeuwarden), was a Dutch Golden Age portrait painter.

According to Arnold Houbraken, he was a good portrait painter who caught the expressions of his subjects well. According to the Netherlands Institute for Art History, his portraits are sometimes confused with works by Wybrand de Geest.
