= Gysbert Japiks =

West Frisian poet (1603–1666)

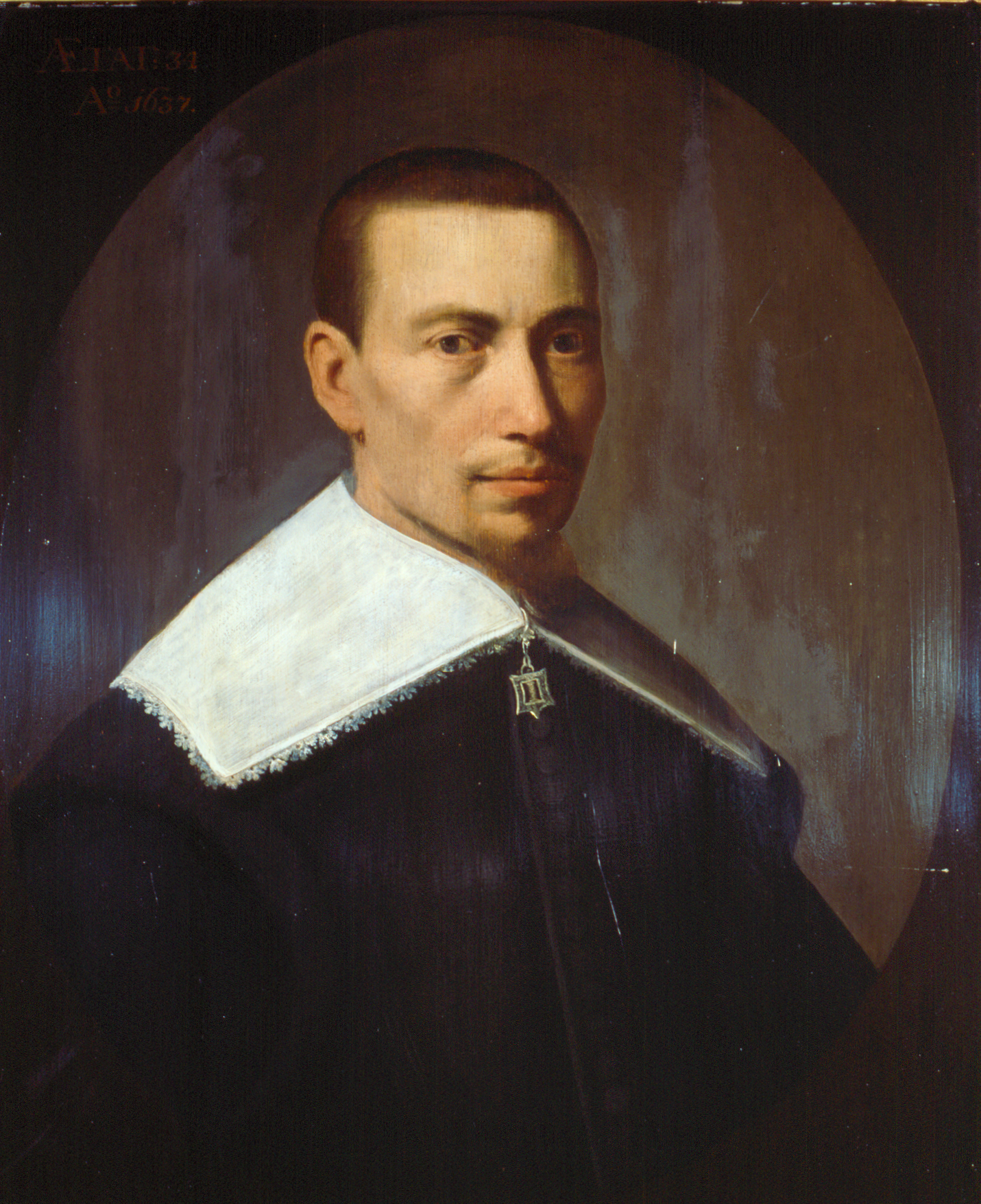
- Gysbert Japicx, 1637, portrait by Matthijs Harings
- Born: Gysbert Japiks Holckema; 1603; Bolsward, Dutch Republic (now the Netherlands)
- Died: 1666 (aged 62–63); Bolsward, Dutch Republic
- Occupations: Poet; teacher
- Notable work: Friessche Tjerne (1640)

Gysbert Japiks (Note: Often written as Japicx or Japix.) Holckema, better known as simply Gysbert Japiks (West Frisian pronunciation: [gizbərt japɪks]; 1603–1666), was a West Frisian writer, poet, schoolmaster, and cantor.

== Life ==
Japiks was born in Bolsward, Friesland, as Gysbert Japiks Holckema or Holkema. Japiks used his patronym and not his surname in his writing. Japiks was a school teacher by profession. In 1656, three of his children had died of the plague and Japiks's eyesight had been affected by the disease. Except for his son Salves, he would lose all his children and his wife to disease. In 1666, Japiks died of the plague.

Japiks started writing from an early age. He wrote in Dutch, Frisian and Latin. He admired the Latin poets Horace and Ovid, but was also an enthusiast for his own West Frisian memmetaal, or mother tongue. His first known poetry dates back from 1639. In his early works Japiks portrayed the life of rural Friesland, and was characterised by excessive alliteration. Much of his work were translations and reworkings of Latin poets, but also the Dutch poets Vondel and Constantijn Huygens featured prominently in his work. His first published work in book form was Friessche Tjerne (1640). In 1644, Franciscus Junius was researching Old German languages, and visited Japiks for work and information about the West Frisian language. Around 1650, Japiks and Abbe Freerks Gabbema started a letter exchange most of which still exists in which Gabbema encouraged Japiks to publish and avoid Dutch orthography in his Frisian writings. His publisher Rintjus however was reluctant to publish in Frisian.

His work was the most notable in that language of his day and had the effect of elevating Frisian to literary status. Japiks's orthography with a much more nuanced and phonetically correct spelling which is significantly different from the Dutch orthography, is very similar to the current official spelling. The poems of Japiks were published in Friessche Tjerne (1640) and also posthumously in Fryske Rijmlerye (1668).

== Songs ==
Japiks's Frisian songs were contrafacta to well-known tunes by composers such as Goudimel, Bourgeois, and Pierre Guédron. A selection from them was recorded by Frisian singers and Camerata Trajectina in 2003.

=== Example ===
First part of the song Wolkom freugde fan 'e wrâld in the original, modern and English version:

Wol-komm' freugde fenne Wrâd, Haed-ljeacht oerre Stierren, Griente, Kruwd in Blomme-Fâd, Mietter fen uwz jieren, Hijmmel-eag dy 't al oer-sjocht Dy uwz Dauwe in Miste' ontjocht Dy uwz 't fjild bemiellet, Ja mey goud oer-striellet.	Wolkom freugde fan 'e wrâld, haadljocht oer de stjirren, griente, krûd blommefâd, mjitter fan ús jierren, himeleach, dy't al oersjocht dy ús dauwe en mist ûntsjocht dy ús 't fjild bemielet. Ja, mei goud oerstrielet.	Welcome joy of the world, headlight over the stars, greens, herb and flower custodian, measurer of our years, heaven-eye that oversees all that pulls us away dew and fog that paints us the field. Yes, radiates it with gold.

== Gysbert Japicx House ==
The house in which Gysbert Japiks was born, was bought in 1979 by his descendants Arjen Holkema and Trijntje Holkema-Slot and turned into a museum. The museum was opened 25 September 1997 by Aad Nuis, State Secretary of Education, Culture and Science. The House also contains the local tourist agency and a bookstore specializing in the Frisian language.
