= Paul Vredeman de Vries =

Flemish painter

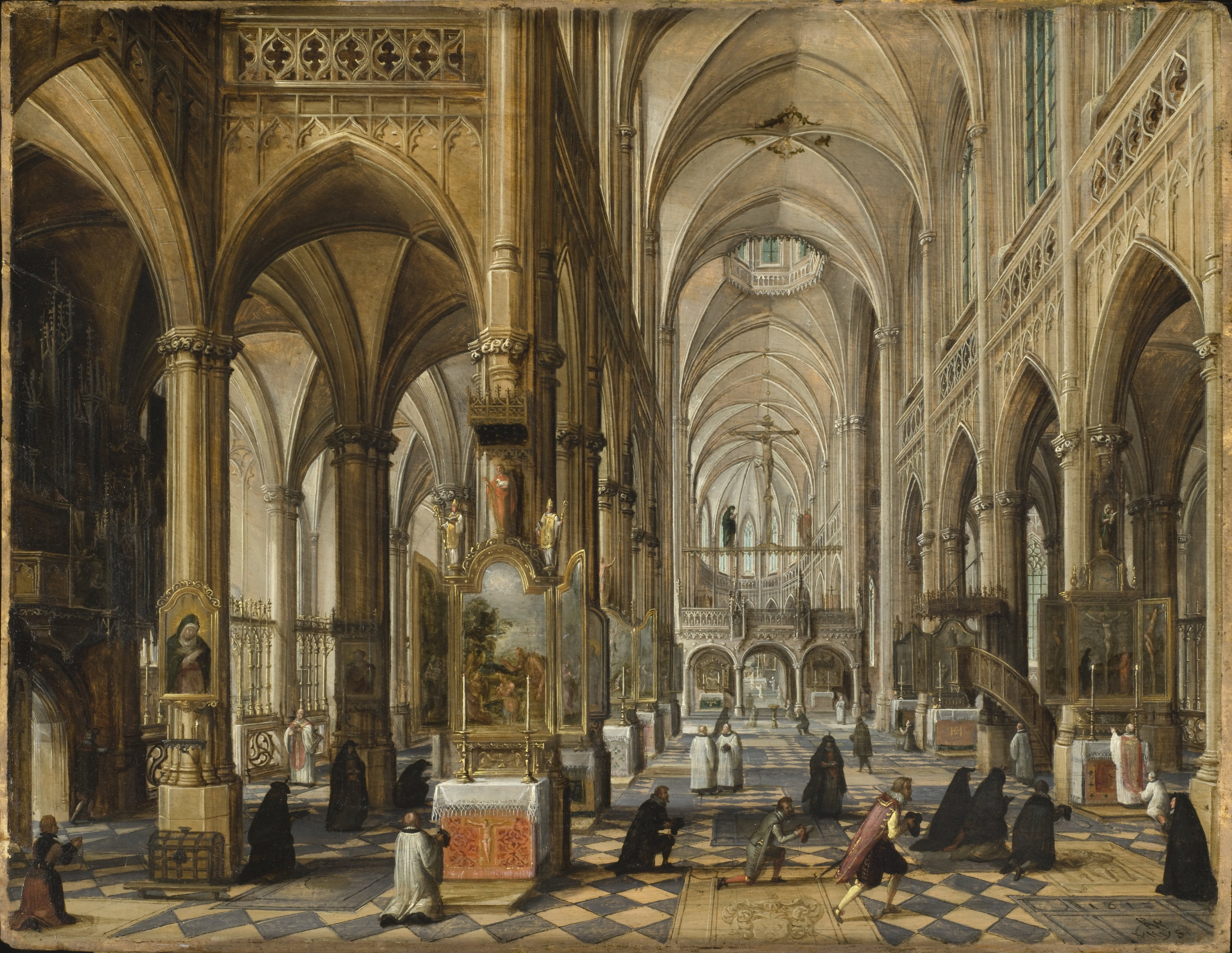
Interior of a Gothic Cathedral, 1612, Los Angeles County Museum of Art

Paul Vredeman de Vries (Antwerp, 1567 – Amsterdam, 1617), was a Flemish painter and draughtsman who specialised in architectural paintings and, in particular, church interiors.

== Life ==
He was a son of the Dutch-born architect, painter and engineer Hans Vredeman de Vries who at the time was working in the Southern Netherlands. In 1564 his father had fled to Antwerp from Mechelen, where he had been living in order to escape the Inquisition. He trained with his father who was as a painter interested in perspective and therefore painted mainly architectural paintings.

He is known to have collaborated with his father in the completion of large assignments. He worked from 1592 to 1595 in Danzig where his father was employed in the design of defensive works. He worked from 1596 to 1599 in Prague where he painted the ceilings and the reception rooms of Emperor Rudolf II's castle. He was active in Amsterdam from 1599 to 1617. There is a record of a notice of marriage between him and Mayken Godelet issued in Amsterdam and dated 24 April 1601. In 1649 she was buried in Nieuwe Kerk. The year her husband died is uncertain; it could be 1630 when his designs for furniture were published or later, but before 1636.

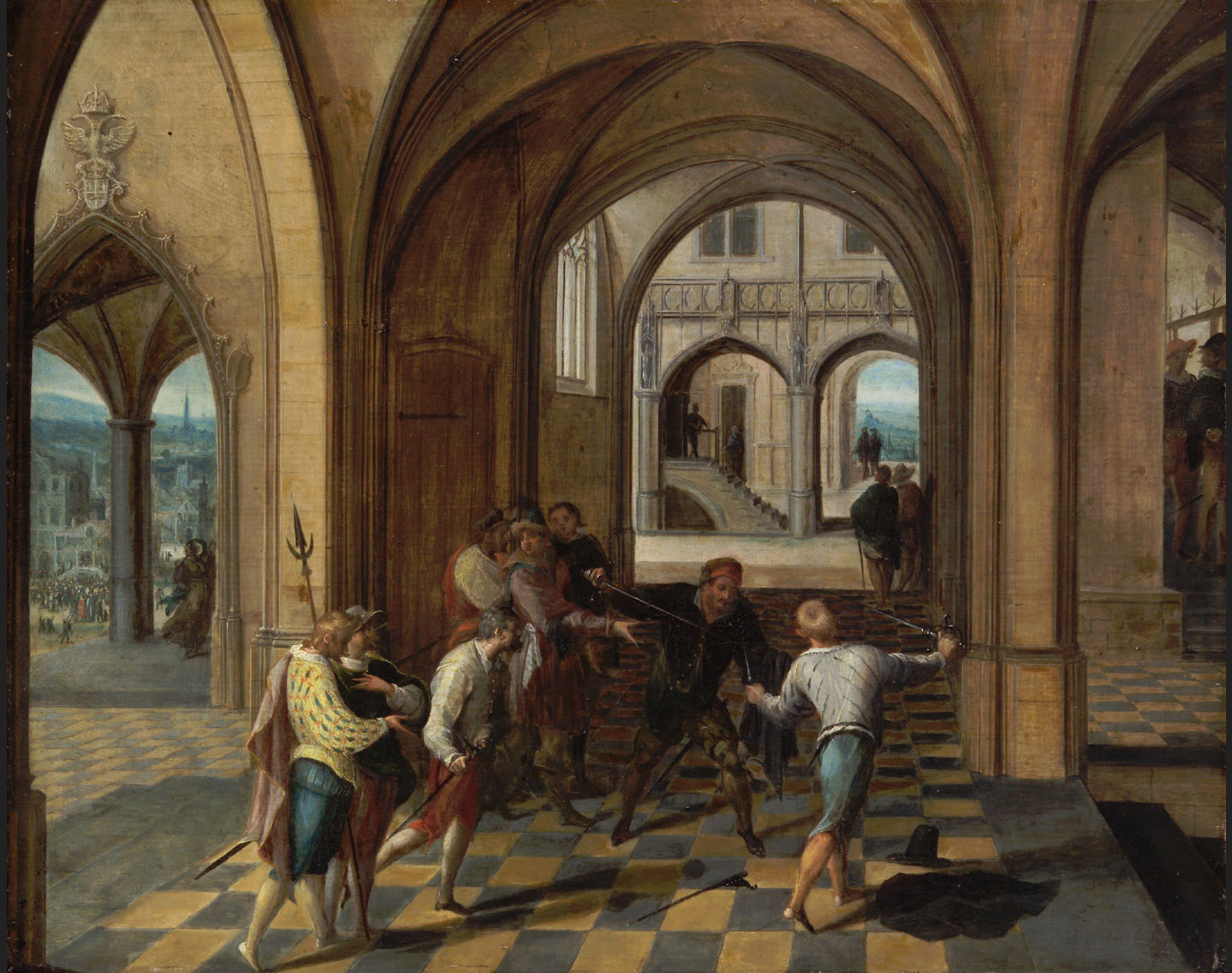
Duel, c. 1600, Kunsthistorisches Museum

He was the master of Hendrick Aerts and Isaak van den Blocke, both artists of Flemish descent who were living in Gdansk. His older brother Salomon Vredeman de Vries (1556–1604) was also an architectural draughtsmen and painter who collaborated with him and his father.

== Work ==
Vredeman de Vries specialised in architectural paintings and, in particular, imaginary church interiors and palaces. His paintings show a meticulous attention to perspective. He developed an original poetic vision in his mature years. The facades of palaces that are richly ornate and the colonnades of which open onto flowered courtyards with fountains and sculptures provide the setting for scenes from ancient history or sacred history. The rigour of the geometric composition, which incorporates the principles of the contemporary treatises on perspective, is tempered by an atmospheric rendering of the light with its silvery shimmers. The interiors are a reconstruction of the interior decoration of his day such as chairs trimmed with leather, embossed leather hangings and canopies with valances.

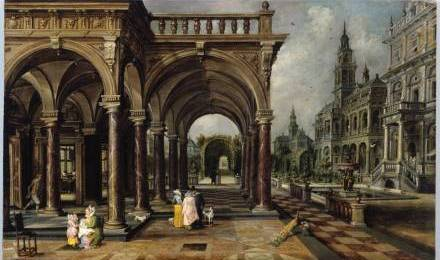
Buildings and gardens, collaboration with Jan Brueghel the Elder, Musée des Beaux-Arts de Strasbourg

He collaborated with his father on large assignments as well as with other artists such as Frans Francken the Younger, Jan Brueghel the Elder, Dirck de Quade van Ravesteyn (while in Prague), Pieter-Franz Isaaksz and Adriaen van Nieulandt (in Amsterdam).

Vredeman de Vries was also active as an engraver. He contributed some of the 31 engravings to his father's architectural treatise entitled Architectura which was published in 1606. He further made the engravings for a series entitled Verscheyden Schrynwerck als Portalen, Kleerkassen, Buffeten (Various woodwork for porches, wardrobes and cupboards), published in 1630. These designs for beds, buffets, cabinets and interior porches in Louis XIII-style would influence Dutch interior design well into the second half of the 17th century.
