= Hans Vredeman de Vries =

Dutch architect and painter (1527–c. 1607)

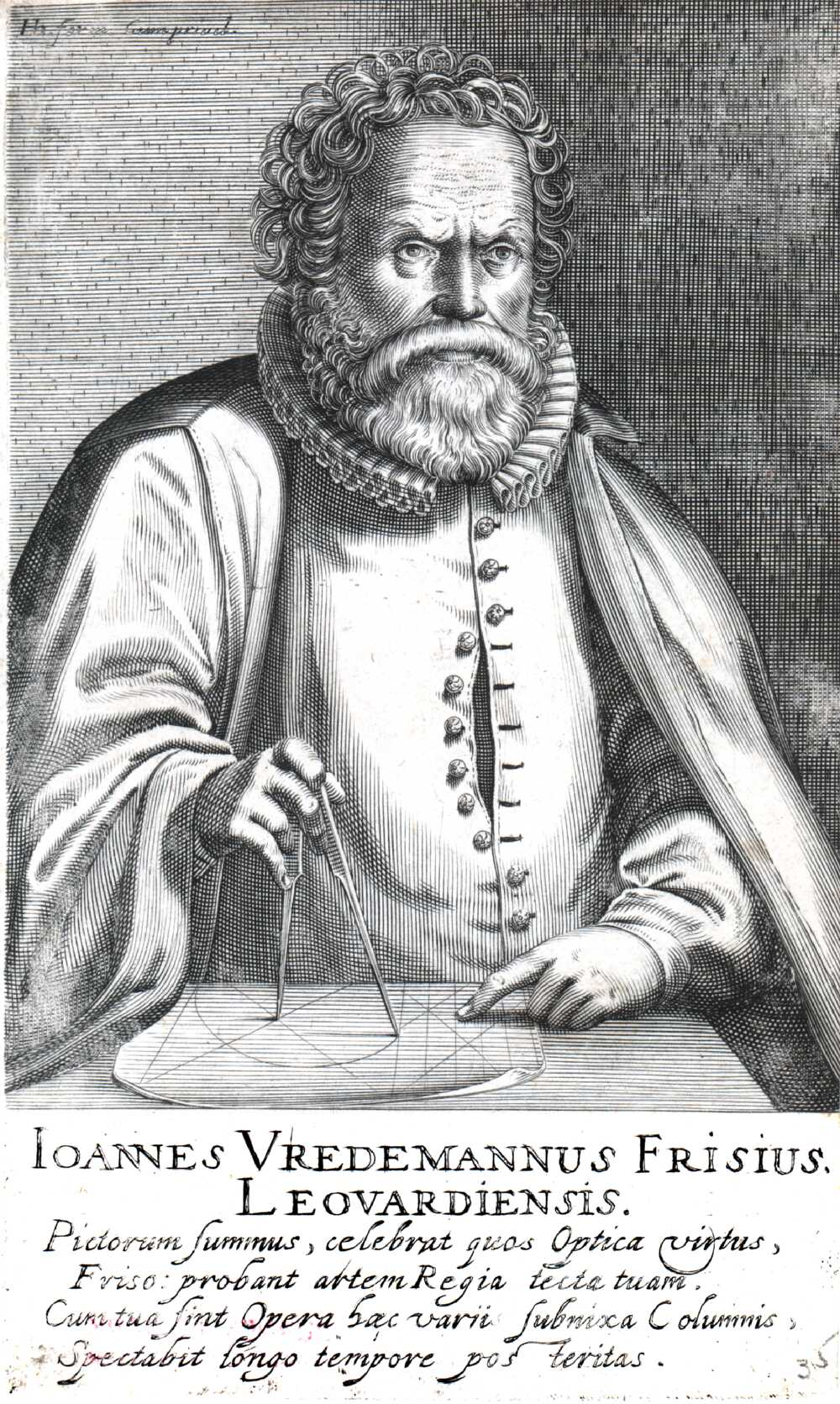
Hans Vredeman de Vries.

Hans Vredeman de Vries (1527 – c. 1607) was a Dutch Renaissance architect, painter, and engineer. Vredeman de Vries is known for his publication in 1583 on garden design and his books with many examples on ornaments (1565) and perspective (1604).

The Vredeman de Vries family included a number of artists and musicians.

== Biography ==
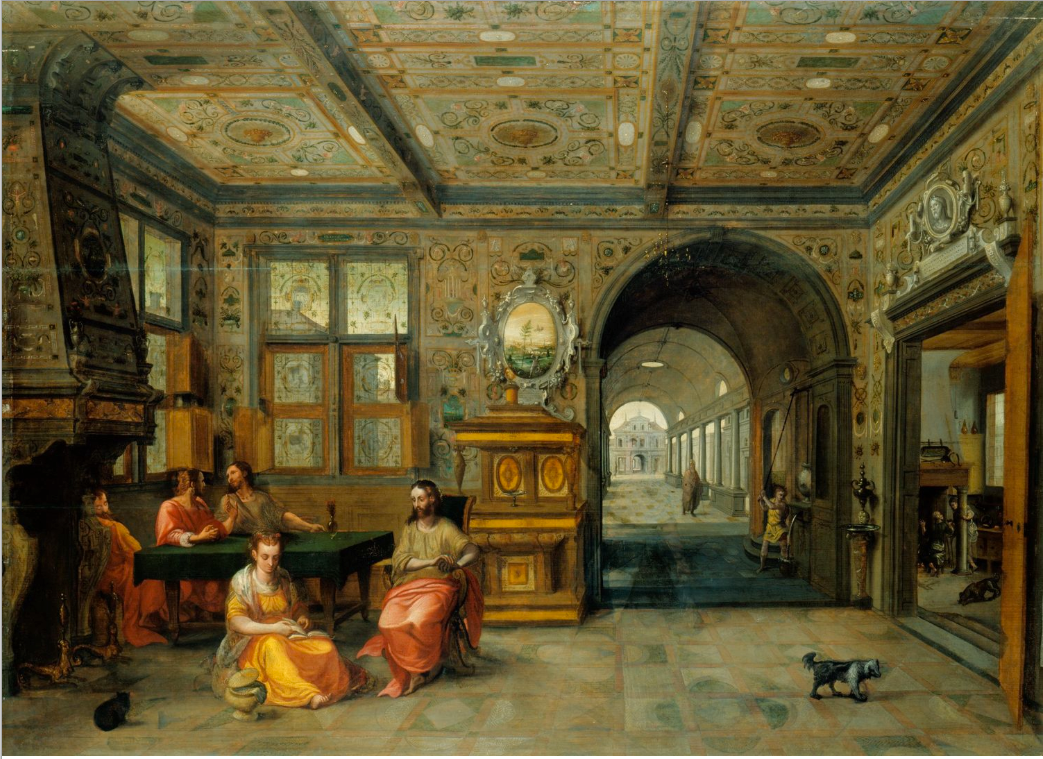
Christ in the House of Martha and Mary, 1566

Born in Leeuwarden and raised in Friesland, in 1546 Vredeman de Vries went to Amsterdam and Kampen. In 1549 he moved to Mechelen where the Superior Court was seating. Sebastian, his brother, was the organist in the local church. Vredeman de Vries designed ornaments for merry parades of Charles V and Philip II. Studying Vitruvius and Sebastiano Serlio, (translated by his teacher Pieter Coecke van Aelst), he became an internationally known specialist in perspective.

He continued his career in Antwerp, where he was appointed city architect and fortification engineer. After 1585 he fled the city because of the Spanish occupation by Alessandro Farnese. As a Protestant, he had to leave the city within two years. Vredeman de Vries moved to Frankfurt and worked in Wolfenbüttel, designing a fortification and a new lay-out of the city for Julius, Duke of Brunswick-Lüneburg. After his death the project was cancelled and Hans worked in Hamburg, Danzig (1592), Prague (1596) and Amsterdam (1600). On his trips Vredeman was accompanied by his son Paul and Hendrick Aerts, both painters. Vredeman de Vries tried to get an appointment at the University of Leiden in 1604.

Vredeman de Vries designed the Great Bed of Ware which is now housed in the Victoria and Albert Museum. The bed is famously large, at around twice the size of a modern double-bed.

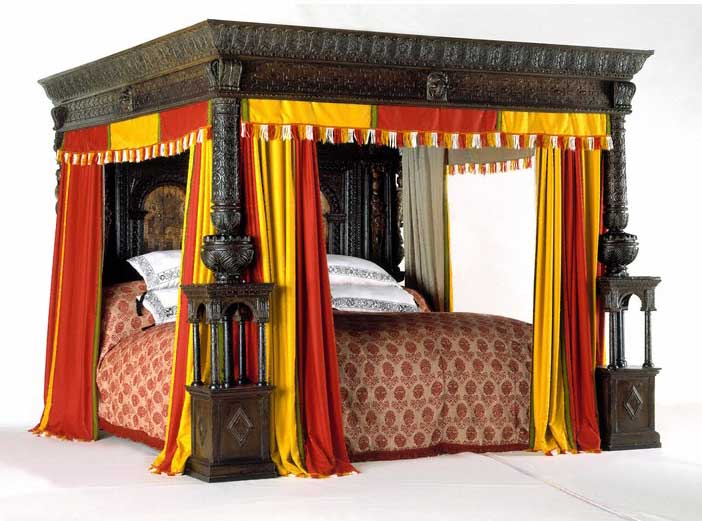
The Great Bed of Ware

His son Salomon was also a painter; Jacob Vredeman de Vries a kapellmeister and composer. It is not known when and where Hans Vredeman de Vries died; however, it is recorded that his son Paul was living in Hamburg when he inherited.

== Bibliography ==
- Hans Jantzen, Das Niederländische Architekturbild, Braunschweig, Klinkhardt & Biermann, 1910
- Bernard G. Maillet, La Peinture Architecturale des Ecoles du Nord: les Intérieurs d'Eglises 1580-1720, Pandora Publishers Wijnegem, 2012, ISBN 9789052353371
- Christopher P. Heue, The City Rehearsed Object, architecture, and print in the worlds of Hans Vredeman de Vries , ISBN 9780415433068
