= East Frisia (peninsula) =

All Frisian areas in Lower Saxony, Germany

Coordinates: 53.4412°N 7.6457°E

Ostfriesland (light green), Oldenburger Friesland (dark green) and other areas (grey) that are part of East Frisia

East Frisia (German: Ost-Friesland; East Frisian Low Saxon: Oost-Freesland) is a collective term for all traditionally Frisian areas in Lower Saxony, Germany, which are primarily located on a peninsula between the Dollart and the Jade Bight. Along with West Frisia and North Frisia, it is one of the most commonly used subdivisions of Frisia.

It is distinct from Ostfriesland – also translated to English as "East Frisia" – which refers to a historic region that occupies the western half of the peninsula (Aurich, Leer, Wittmund and Emden). Besides Ostfriesland, East Frisia includes Landkreis Friesland and Wilhelmshaven (Oldenburger Friesland), and in a broader sense also Saterland, the Butjadingen peninsula (Rüstringen) and Land Wursten.

== Ostfriesland and Ost-Friesland ==
Because the spelling of the German terms for the geographic and historic regions is so similar – Ost-Friesland refers to the peninsular and Ostfriesland to the historic region – Germans living outside the area often incorrectly call the whole peninsula Ostfriesland. Because the rather artificial spelling of Ost-Friesland does not go down well in the region itself and its use is becoming rarer, the regional media increasingly use the term ostfriesische Halbinsel or East Frisian peninsula instead of Ost-Friesland.

Ostfriesland covers the territory of the former County of East Frisia, which roughly corresponds to the present-day districts (Landkreise) of Aurich, Leer and Wittmund and the town of Emden. By contrast, Ost-Friesland includes, as a rule, the other traditionally Frisian parts of the peninsula: the town of Wilhelmshaven and the Oldenburg district of Friesland (Jeverland and Friesische Wehde).

Rather more rarely, the term Ost-Friesland also includes Saterland, home to the Saterland Frisians. One occasionally comes across Ost-Friesland being used only to refer to these three areas (Landkreis Friesland, Wilhelmshaven and Saterland), but this is not correct. The publishing house of Brune-Mettcker from Wittmund uses the term Ost-Friesland for the circulation area of its three daily papers, which cover eastern East Frisia, the northern part of Friesland district and the town of Wilhelmshaven.

In its broadest definition, Ost-Friesland can be used to embrace all the Frisian parts of the German state of Lower Saxony, i.e. those areas which represent the "East Section" of the Interfrisian Council (which include the former Rüstringen (Butjadingen etc.), Land Wursten and sometimes other areas).

In spoken German, to emphasise that Ost-Friesland is meant and not Ostfriesland, the stress is placed on the prefix Ost instead of on the syllable fries.

== Self-description and delimitation ==
According to popular belief, the term Ostfriesland is purely geographical and includes the district of Friesland and the town of Wilhelmshaven. However, this is not the local view. The residents of East Frisia (i.e. districts of Aurich, Leer, Wittmund and the town of Emden) are the only ones who call themselves fully East Frisian. In the district of Frisia and town of Wilhelmshaven, however, they hardly, if ever, refer to themselves as East Frisian. If the inhabitants of these two areas do not call themselves Frieslanders (Friesländer or, more rarely, Frisians) or Wilhelmshaveners, then they tend to be known as Oldenburgisch.

The modern district of "Friesland" owes its name to its location in the north of Oldenburg Land – i.e. the Frisian part of Oldenburg. This leads to the fact that the district of Friesland is located east of East Frisia, a fact which is sometimes confusing to those from outside the region.

The dividing line between East Frisia and the Oldenburg district of Friesland is also the historic border between the former Principality of East Frisia and the County of Oldenburg, and is called the Golden Line. An attempt to bridge this "golden line" was undertaken in the 1970s as part of the Lower Saxon district reforms. At that time part of the Oldenburg district of Friesland was merged with the East Frisian district of Wittmund, under the name of Friesland district with its seat in Wittmund. After successful lawsuits were taken to the Lower Saxony State Court in Bückeburg this reform was reversed and the districts split again. Only the old Amt of Göden, i.e. the villages of Göden, Neustadtgöden and Dykhusen, remained in the Frisian municipality of Sande after the restoration of the old districts, and thereby left a piece of East Frisia in the district of Friesland.

== Wangerooge ==
The difference between historical-political and geographical view of East Frisia has left the island of Wangerooge with an "ambiguous" situation. On the one hand it is counted geographically as one of the East Frisian Islands. On the other hand, it has belonged, politically and historically, to Jeverland for centuries and hence, since 1818, to Oldenburg, and today to the district of Friesland. It is in a sense the only part of "Oldenburg" in the (inhabited) East Frisian Islands.

== Saterland ==
The Saterland has a special role to play. Its historical culture and language makes it part of East Frisia, but due to its isolation, it came under the influence of the Diocese of Münster early on, whilst the East Frisian area was placed under the Diocese of Bremen. This separation from the late Middle Ages has left its imprint today: the Saterland now belongs to the district of Cloppenburg. Thanks to its isolation, Saterland Frisian is the only version of the East Frisian language to survive today, while East Frisian dialects of West Low German are spoken in the rest of the region (the so-called East Frisian Low Saxon or Ostfriesisches Platt).
