= Saterland Frisian =

Saterland Frisian may refer to:

- Something of, from, or related to Saterland
  - Saterland Frisian language
  - Saterland Frisians

== See also ==
- Frisian (disambiguation)
