= Frisian Americans =

Americans of Frisian birth or descent

Total population
- 3,125 (2000 estimate) (Note: Excluding Dutch and German Americans, many of whom are of partial Frisian descent)

Regions with significant populations
- New York, New England, Wisconsin, Michigan, California, and Minnesota

Languages
- American English, Frisian, German, Dutch, Low German

Religion
- Christianity (mainly Protestantism)

Related ethnic groups
- Other Frisians • Dutch Americans • German Americans • Mennonite Americans • Danish Americans

Frisian Americans are Americans with full or partial Frisian ancestry.

Frisians are a Germanic ethnic group native to the coastal parts of the Netherlands and Germany. They are closely related to the Dutch, Northern Germans, and the English and speak Frisian languages divided by geographical regions. The Old Frisian language was once the closest Germanic language to Old English, though outside influences (from Dutch on Frisian and from Norman French on English) have made both languages grow ever farther apart than they naturally would have as they were developing separately.

Today there exists a tripartite division of the original Frisians; namely the North Frisians, East Frisians and West Frisian, caused by the Frisia's constant loss of territory in the Middle Ages, but the West Frisians in the general do not feel or see themselves as part of a larger group of Frisians, and, according to a 1970 inquiry, identify themselves more with the Dutch than with East or North Frisians. Therefore the moniker 'Frisian' is (when used for the speakers of all three Frisian language) a linguistic (and to some extent, cultural) concept, not a political one.

Because there is no modern united Frisian state, Frisian Americans are often included within Dutch Americans, German Americans or Scandinavian Americans.

== History ==
In the New Netherland colony, Frisian people from North Frisia, East Frisia and West Friesland were the largest ethnic group in the city of New Amsterdam (now New York City). The New Amsterdam area was chiefly explored by Jonas Bronk, who led a group of settlers from North Frisia, and one of the city's boroughs was later named The Bronx after him. Bronk (also known as Bronck) himself is said to have been Swedish. Many North-Frisian settlers were refugees of the Burchardi flood of 1634 which had destroyed the wealthy island of Strand. According to Paulsen, "they introduced their old democratic traditions into the patrician Dutch society of that time."

== Notable people ==
- Icko Iben - Astrophysicist and distinguished Professor Emeritus at the University of Illinois

=== East Frisian origin ===
- Pieter Claesen Wyckoff, born in Norden
- Minnie Marx, born in Dornum
- Marx Brothers - comedians
- Friedrich Diercks - pioneer settler in Texas, born in Gödens
- Wolfgang Petersen - film director, born in Emden
- Theodore Thomas - first music director of the Chicago Symphony Orchestra, born in Esens
- Al Shean - comedian, born in Dornum
- Karsten Schwan - computer pioneer, born in Oldenburg
- Ub Iwerks - animator, co-creator of Mickey Mouse

=== North Frisian origin ===
- Cornelius Jensen – pioneer settler in the Inland Empire (California)
- Ludwig Nissen – gemstone dealer and philanthropist, born in Husum

=== West Frisian origin ===
- Dan Bylsma – Pittsburgh Penguins head coach
- Lenny Dykstra - baseball player
- Bridget Fonda - actress
- Henry Fonda - actor
- Jane Fonda - actress
- Peter Fonda - actor
- William K. Frankena – moral philosopher
- Anna-Marie Goddard - nude model and Playboy Playmate
- Rod Jellema – poet, teacher and translator
- Frederick Manfred - novelist
- Jack R. Lousma - astronaut
- David Pietersz. de Vries – founder of New Amsterdam
- David Petraeus – general and politician
- Alvin Plantinga – philosopher
- Kyrsten Sinema - politician
- Peter Stuyvesant – Director-General of New Netherland
- Sam Peckinpah, film director
- Geerhardus Vos – Frisian-born theologian, professor of biblical theology at Princeton Theological Seminary.
