= West Frisians =

Ethnic group in the Netherlands

West Frisian people
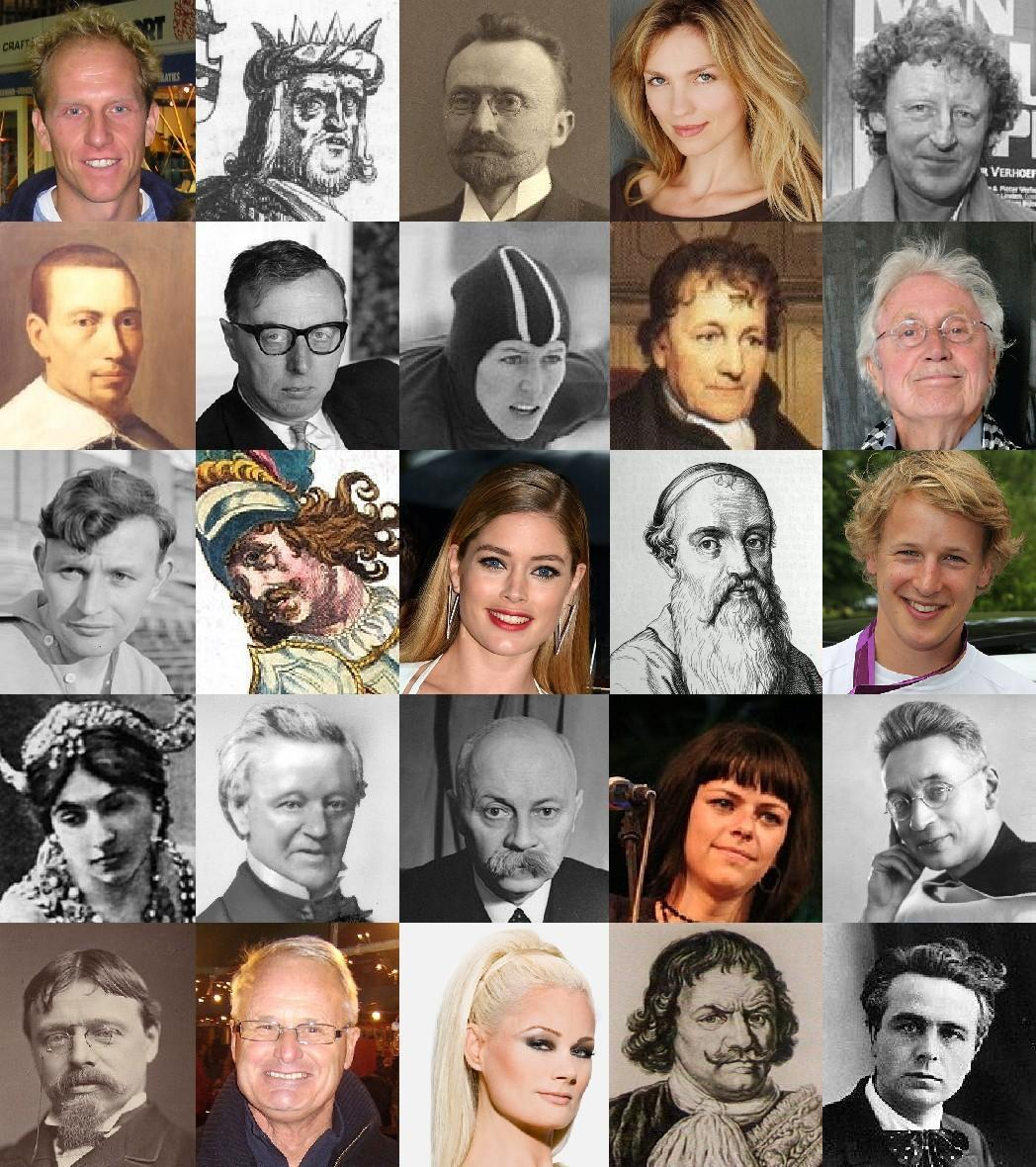

Regions with significant populations
- Netherlands Friesland: 400,000

Languages
- West Frisian, Friso-Saxon, West Frisian Dutch, Stadsfries Dutch

Related ethnic groups
- North Frisians, East Frisians, Saterland Frisians

The West Frisians or, more precisely, the Westlauwers Frisians (Dutch: Friezen or Westerlauwerse Friezen, West Frisian: Friezen or Westerlauwerske Friezen), are those Frisian peoples in that part of Frisia administered by the Netherlands: the Province of Friesland, which is bounded in the west by the IJsselmeer and in the east by the River Lauwers (hence the name Westlauwers, i.e., "west of the Lauwers").

In Germany, Dutch Frisia is often usually called "West Frisia" (Westfriesland), because the German part is called "East Frisia" (Ostfriesland), hence the term "West Frisians" (Westfriesen). However, in the Netherlands, the term West-Friezen is only used to refer to the inhabitants of the unconnected region of West Friesland and not to the Westlauwers Frisians.

The Westerlauwers Frisians are related to the North Frisians and the eastern Frisians (East Frisians, Saterland Frisians etc.). Whilst many East Frisians had lost their Frisian language by the late Middle Ages, of the 660,000 or so Frisians in the Netherlands, more than 400,000 still speak West Frisian.

Many Frisian Americans descend from West Frisians.
