= East Frisian =

East Frisian (also East Friesian) is an adjective referring to East Frisia, a region in Germany. It can refer specifically to:

- East Frisians, the people from the region
- East Friesian (sheep), a breed of sheep originating there
- East Frisian Islands, off the coast of East Frisia
- East Frisian Low Saxon, the Low German dialect spoken there
- Ostfriesen and Alt-Oldenburger, a breed of horse originating there
- East Frisian language, a language historically spoken in Saterland

== See also ==
- Frisian (disambiguation)
