= Marron Curtis Fort =

American-German linguist (1938–2019)

- Born: October 24, 1938; Boston, Massachusetts
- Died: December 18, 2019 (aged 81)
- Parent: Marron William Fort (father)

Academic background
- Education: University of Pennsylvania
- Thesis: Beschreibung der Vechtaer Mundart (1965)
- Doctoral advisor: Alfred Senn

Academic work
- Discipline: Linguistics
- Sub-discipline: Germanistics
- Institutions: University of New Hampshire; University of Oldenburg

Marron Curtis Fort (October 24, 1938 – December 18, 2019) was an American-born German linguist and professor who specialized in the study of Saterland Frisian and Low German (Plattdeutsch) spoken in northern Germany. Fort was a German citizen and lived in Leer. Fort's work in print and appearances in radio and television have contributed greatly to the preservation and furthering of the Saterland Frisian language and Low German language and culture in general.

== Academic career ==
Fort was born in Boston to Alice and Marron William Fort. His father was the first African-American to receive a PhD in engineering. After attending boarding school in New Hampshire, Fort began his studies in Princeton University in 1957, including German studies, English, Dutch studies, Scandinavian studies, and mathematics. In 1961, he transferred to the University of Pennsylvania in Philadelphia. In 1963, Fort participated in a university exchange program at Albert-Ludwigs-Universität Freiburg. In 1965 Fort completed his PhD with Professor Alfred Senn at University of Pennsylvania with a dissertation on the Low German language spoken in Vechta.

From 1969 until 1985, Fort taught as Professor of German at the University of New Hampshire. During this time, specifically 1976–77 and 1982–83, Fort lectured as a guest professor at University of Oldenburg and began to study Saterland Frisian as well as East Frisian Low Saxon. At the University of Oldenburg, Fort was a Senior Researcher beginning in 1983 and was in charge of the Center for Low German and Saterland Frisian until his retirement in 2003. Fort lived in Germany after 1982.

As part of his involvement with Saterland Frisian, Fort published a Saterland Frisian dictionary as well as two volumes of folk tales in that language. He also prepared a translation of the New Testament and Psalms.

== Honors ==
Fort received numerous awards, honors and titles from academic institutions, community organizations and cultural councils in northern Germany.

== Works ==
- Saterfriesisches Wörterbuch. Helmut Buske Verlag, Hamburg 1980. ISBN 3-87118-401-2
- Saterfriesisches Volksleben. Ostendorp, Rhauderfehn 1985. ISBN 3-921516-42-0
- Saterfriesische Stimmen. Ostendorp, Rhauderfehn 1990. ISBN 3-921516-48-X
- Dät Näie Tästamänt un do Psoolme in ju aasterlauwersfräiske Uurtoal fon dät Seelterlound, Fräislound, Butjoarlound, Aastfräislound un do Groninger Umelounde. Oldenburg 2003. ISBN 3-8142-0692-4
- Saterfriesisches Wörterbuch. 2., completely revised and expanded volume. With 1 CD-ROM, 2015, ISBN 978-3-87548-723-7.
