= North Frisia (disambiguation) =

North Frisia may refer to

- the historical region of North Frisia
- the district of Nordfriesland (German: Landkreis Nord-Friesland)
- the Northern part of the Dutch Provincie of Friesland (Fryslân)

The term North Frisian may also refer to:

- Something of, from, or related to North Frisia
  - North Frisian language
  - North Frisians, the inhabitants of the region of North Frisia
  - North Frisian Islands
  - North Frisian Barrier Island

== See also ==
- Frisian (disambiguation)
