= West Frisian =

West Frisian can refer to:

- The West Frisian branch of the Frisian languages, spoken in the Friesland province of the Netherlands.
- The West Frisian language, also known as Frisian or Frysk, a West Frisian language spoken by over 400,000 people
- Something of or relating to the West Frisia territory in the Netherlands.
- Something of or relating to the West Friesland region of the Netherlands.
- The West Frisian dialect of Dutch, spoken in the North Holland province of the Netherlands.
- West Frisians, people of the Netherlands.

== See also ==
- Frisian (disambiguation)
