= Frisian =

Frisian(s) most often refers to:

- Frisia, a cross-border coastal region in Germany and the Netherlands
  - Frisians, the medieval and modern ethnic group inhabiting Frisia
    - Frisii, the ancient inhabitants of Frisia prior to 600 AD
  - Frisian languages, a group of West Germanic languages, including:
    - Old Frisian, spoken in Frisia from the 8th to 16th Century
    - Middle Frisian, spoken in Frisia from the 16th to 19th Century
    - North Frisian language, spoken in Schleswig-Holstein, Germany
    - Saterland Frisian language, spoken in Lower Saxony, Germany
    - West Frisian language, spoken in Friesland, Netherlands
  - Frisian cuisine, the traditional recipes and cooking methods of Frisia

Frisian or Friesian may also refer to:

== Animal breeds ==
- Friesian (chicken), a Dutch breed of chicken
- East Friesian sheep, a breed of sheep notable for its high production of milk
- Friesian horse, a horse breed from Friesland
- Friesian Sporthorse, a type of Frisian cross, bred specifically for sport horse disciplines
- Holstein Friesian cattle, a widespread black-and-white breed of dairy cattle

== Other uses ==
- Friesan Fire, a horse that ran in the 2009 Kentucky Derby
- Frisian horse or cheval de frise, a type of military barrier
- Frisian School, a school of philosophy based on the works of Jakob Friedrich Fries
- Frisian Solar Challenge, a solar-powered boat race

== See also ==
- East Frisian (disambiguation)
- West Frisian (disambiguation)
