= Friso-Saxon dialects =

West-Germanic dialect group

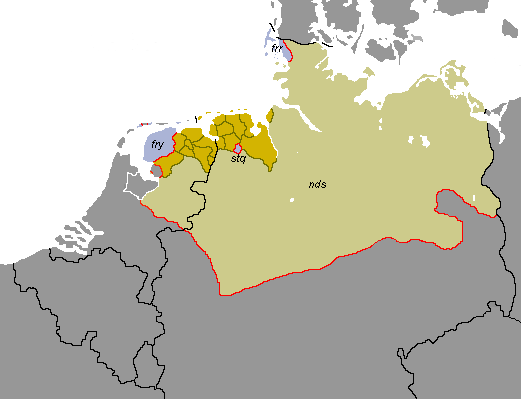
Low German/Low Saxon (without Friso-Saxon dialects) Friso-Saxon dialects: Low German/Low Saxon dialects with a substrate of a Frisian language Frisian languages

The area numbered 4 consists of the Friso-Saxon dialects of Gronings and East Frisian Low Saxon

Friso-Saxon (Dutch: friso-saksische tongvallen, friso-saksisch) is a group of West Germanic dialects found around the North Sea coast of the Netherlands and Germany, in an area historically known as Frisia. They are dialects of Low German/Low Saxon that have experienced strong influence from a Frisian language.

The term was established by the Dutch researcher Johan Winkler in his work about Dutch, Low German and Frisian dialects in the region. In the following decades the term was adopted by some of Winkler's successors.

The Friso-Saxon dialects are spoken in areas which were historically Frisian-speaking, until Frisian was gradually replaced with Low Saxon beginning in the Late Middle Ages. However, Frisian has remained as a substratum since then in the regions concerned. The only exception to this rule is Stellingwarfs, a Low Saxon dialect which has undergone influence especially from West Frisian. Most of the other Friso-Saxon dialects underwent most influence from East Frisian, for example East Frisian Low Saxon and Gronings. The, by philological history, not philological categorization Friso-Saxon, Dithmarschen dialect underwent most influence from North Frisian.

== See also ==
- Frisians
