= East Frisians =

Inhabitants of East Frisia, Lower Saxony

Regions with significant populations
- Lower Saxony East Frisia: 60,000 – 220,000

Languages
- Saterland Frisian, East Frisian Low Saxon, German

Religion
- Christianity

Related ethnic groups
- Saterland Frisians, West Frisians, North Frisians

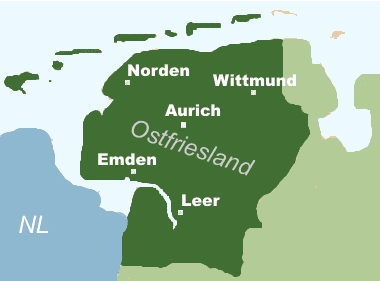
East Frisia

East Frisians (German: Ostfriesen, Saterland Frisian: Aastefräisen, East Frisian Oostfräisen) are, in the wider sense, the inhabitants of East Frisia in the northwest of the German state of Lower Saxony. In the narrower sense the East Frisians are the eastern branch of the Frisians, a distinct Germanic ethnic group, and are one of the nationally recognized ethnic minorities in Germany, along with the Danes, Sorbs, Sinti and Romanies. They are closely related to the Saterland Frisians, who come from East Frisia and moved from the coastal region to the interior. The East Frisians are also related to the North Frisians and the Westlauwers Frisians.

Sometimes all Frisians from the eastern Frisian regions (East Frisians, Saterland Frisians, Oldenburg Frisians, Rüstringen Frisians, Wurtfrisians) are referred to as East Frisians, because all these Frisians form the eastern branch of the Frisians.

In the eastern Frisian regions, in contrast to North and West Frisia, the Frisian language was gradually replaced by Low Saxon dialects very early. The local dialect is now East Frisian Low Saxon. Though not a Frisian language by linguistic classification, the language is a dialect of the Low Saxon language which is locally known as "East Frisian" ("Oostfreesk"), and has major influences in vocabulary and grammar from the original East Frisian language. The only surviving dialect of the East Frisian language is the Saterlandic dialect.

In the Interfrisian Council, they are included in the East section.

== See also ==
- East Frisian jokes
