= Saterland Frisians =

Saterland Frisians Saterfriesen (Seeltersk)
- Flag of Saterland

Total population
- c. 2,250

Regions with significant populations
- Germany Saterland: 2,250

Languages
- Saterland Frisian

Religion
- Roman Catholic majority

Related ethnic groups
- Frisians, Other Germanic peoples (especially Afrikaners, Dutch, and Germans)

Saterland in Germany

The Saterland Frisians (German: Saterfriesen, Saterland Frisian: Seelterfräisen [ˈseːltɐfrɛi̯zən]) are one of the smallest language groups in Europe. They belong to the eastern branch of the Frisian people and are thus a recognised minority within Germany. They live in the Saterland (Saterland Frisian: Seelterlound), a community in the northern part of Cloppenburg district (Lower Saxony).

== History ==
The Saterland Frisians came from East Frisia, but around 1200 they left their old homeland after several major storm tides and settled the present-day Saterland. There they superimposed themselves on the indigenous, but thinly spread Westphalian-Saxons and assimilated them. The fact that they are clearly counted as Frisians is evinced by a document dated May 1400: together with the other East Frisian estates and rural communities, they signed an agreement with representatives of the Hanseatic League that they would no longer afford any more assistance to the Victual Brothers, a band of pirates active in the North Sea. Also, in a document from that time, the Saterland Frisians were designated as belonging to the seven Frisian coastal lands.

The Saterland Frisians are one of the few Frisians who are traditionally Catholic. During the Reformation, they switched to Protestantism, but were re-Catholicized after the Peace of Westphalia because they belonged to the diocese of Münster.

What is noteworthy about the Saterland Frisians today is that they have preserved the old Frisian language, the last Frisians in East Frisia to do so, Approximately 1,000-2,500 people speak a Frisian dialect interspersed with elements of Low Saxon known as Saterland Frisian. Research by the University of Göttingen put the number at 2,250 persons.

== See also ==
- East Frisians
- North Frisians

== Sources ==
- Annette Heese: Das Saterland - Ein Streifzug durch die Geschichte Gemeinde Saterland, Saterland 1988, ISBN 3-9801728-0-5
- Hanne Klöver: Spurensuche im Saterland: Ein Lesebuch zur Geschichte einer Gemeinde friesischen Ursprungs im Oldenburger Land, SKN Druck & Verlag GmbH & Co., Saterland 1998, ISBN 3-928327-32-1
- Saterfriesisches Volksleben: Texte u. Zeugnisse aus d. fries. Saterland mit hochdt. Übers. / Marron C. Fort [ed.]. Rhauderfehn: Ostendorp, 1985, ISBN 3-921516-42-0
- Saterfriesische Stimmen: Texte und Zeugnisse aus d. fries. Saterland mit hochdt. Übers. / Marron C. Fort [ed.]. Rhauderfehn: Ostendorp, 1990, ISBN 3-921516-48-X
