= Marron William Fort =

American chemist (1906–1961)

- Born: June 11, 1906
- Died: September 18, 1961 (aged 55)
- Burial place: Arlington National Cemetery

Marron William Fort (June 11, 1906 – September 18, 1961) was an American chemist who was the first African-American to receive a Ph.D. in any engineering field. He also was the first African-American to earn a doctorate from the Massachusetts Institute of Technology, graduating with a Ph.D. in chemical engineering in 1933.

== Early life and education ==
Born in Cambridge, Massachusetts, June 11, 1906, to Irene Fort and her husband, Fort attended Cambridge High and Latin School, graduating on June 18, 1918. He entered Massachusetts Institute of Technology (MIT) in 1922, graduating with an S.B. in 1926 and an S.M. in 1927, both in electrical engineering. In 1933, he completed a Ph.D. in the Department of Chemistry with a dissertation entitled "Heat of Dilution of Hydrochloric Acid by Continuous Flow Calorimetry".

== Career ==
During World War II, Fort served as chief chemist and plant superintendent of H. and G. J. Caldwell Company in Massachusetts. In 1954, he joined the chemical industries staff at the Advisory Bureau for Commerce of the U.S. Department of Commerce, serving in Tel Aviv, Israel, making him the highest ranked African-American appointed to a governmental technical post in a foreign country at that time. In 1957, he joined the International Cooperation Administration, an agency of the U.S. Department of State, and then served as deputy chief on the Industrial and Transportation Division, U.S. Operations Mission, of the International Co-op Administration at Ankara, Turkey, until 1959. He became chief of this same division in Pakistan until 1961 when he returned to Washington, D.C., with the Department of State.

== Death and legacy ==
Fort died in Washington on September 18, 1961, and was buried in Arlington National Cemetery. He was survived by his wife Alice (nee Curtiss) and son Marron C. Fort.

In 1973, MIT established a graduate fellowship in Fort's honor. The Fort Fellowship was awarded to "the most promising senior minority student who has been accepted for graduate study at M.I.T."
