= West Frisia =

Frisian areas west of the Dollart, Netherlands

Coordinates: 53°8′N 5°49′E

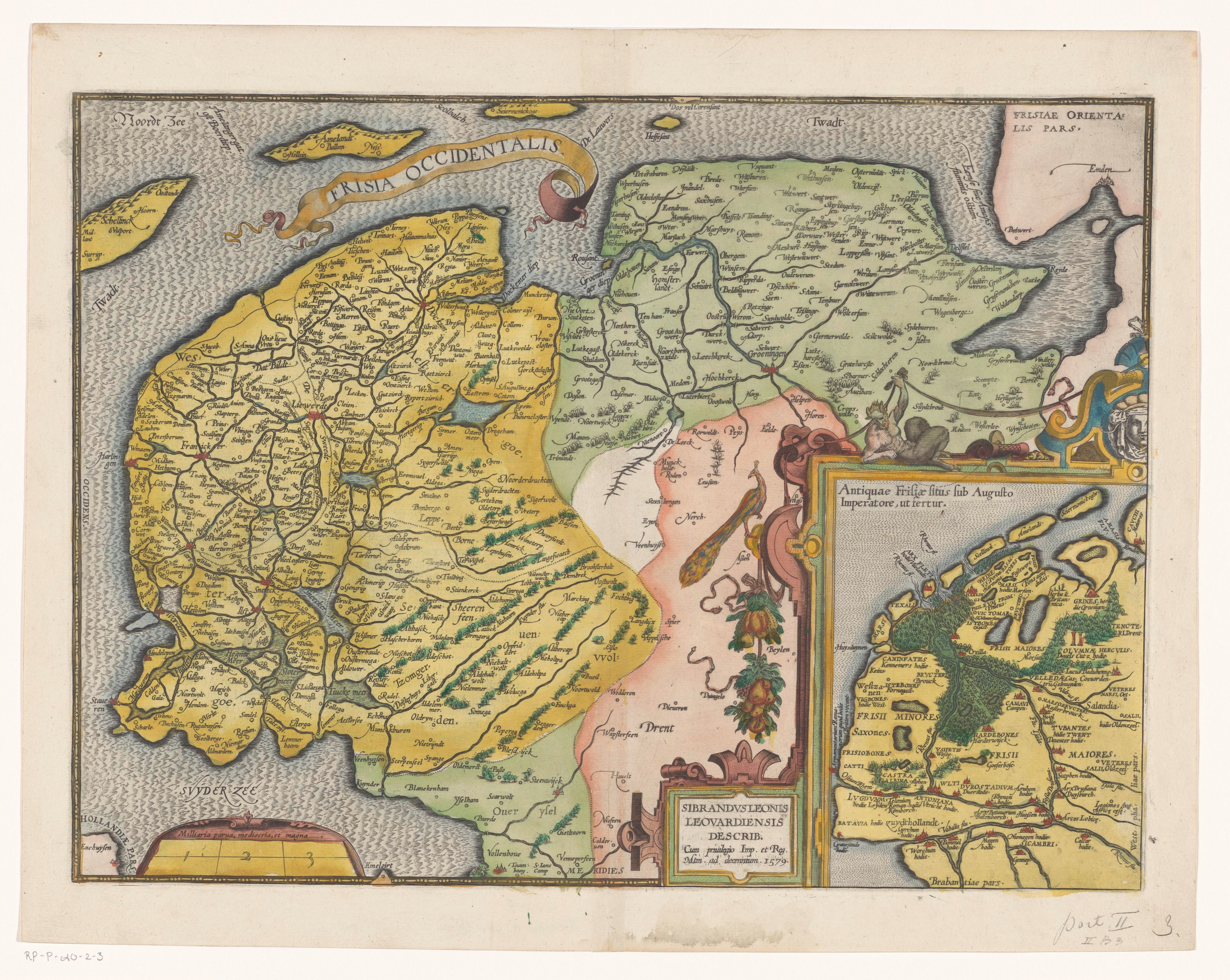
Map of Frisia Occidentalis (1579)

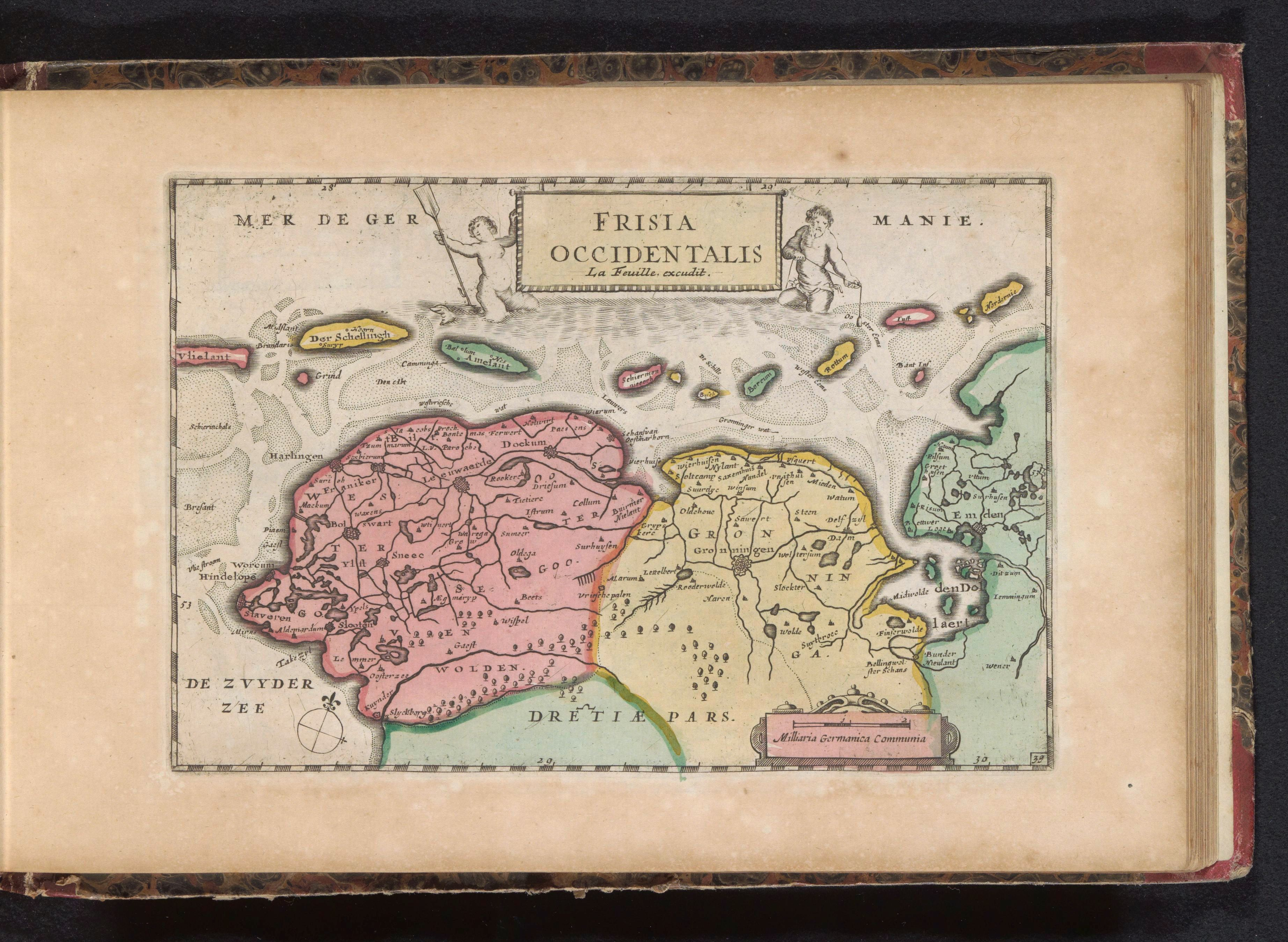
Map of Frisia Occidentalis (18th century)

West Frisia (/ˈfriːʒə/; Latin: Frisia Occidentalis; West Frisian: West-Fryslân) is a term that, when used in an international context, refers to the traditionally Frisian areas that are located west of the Dollart (i.e. in the present-day Netherlands). Along with East Frisia and North Frisia, it is one of the most commonly used subdivisions of Frisia. In its narrowest sense, the term is synonymous with the province of Friesland. Within the Netherlands, however, it is mostly used to refer to the region of West Friesland, located west of Friesland.

== Definitions ==
In Germany and the English-speaking world, the term "West Frisia" usually refers to the territory between the Vlie and the Lauwers, where the West Frisian language is spoken: the province of Friesland (West Frisian: Fryslân). In its broadest sense, it also includes the Ommelanden and the region of West Friesland. In West Friesland, the West Frisian dialect is spoken.

Historically, the term has had different definitions. The Lex Frisionum, for instance, distinguishes three districts of Frisia, defining West Frisia as the territory "between Zwin and Vlie" (present-day Holland and Zeeland) and East Frisia as the territory "between Lauwers and Weser". At the time, the region between the Vlie and the Lauwers was known as "Middle Frisia".

== Maps ==
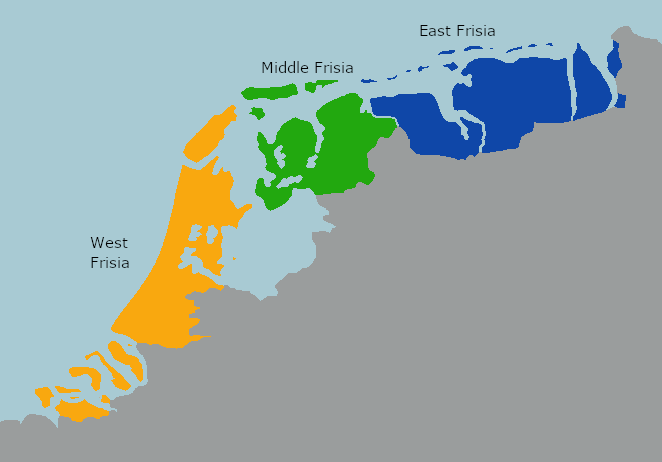
Division of Frisia by the Lex Frisionum

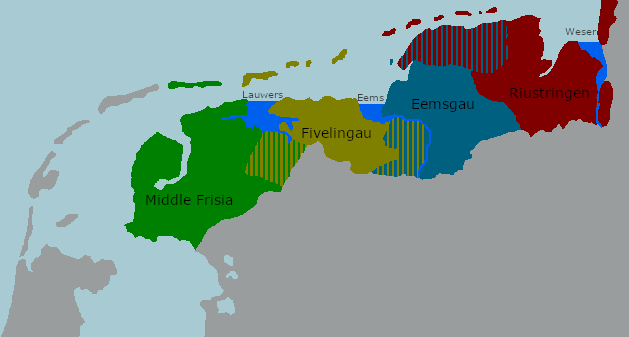
Rough outline of the four counties of Frisia east of the Vlie

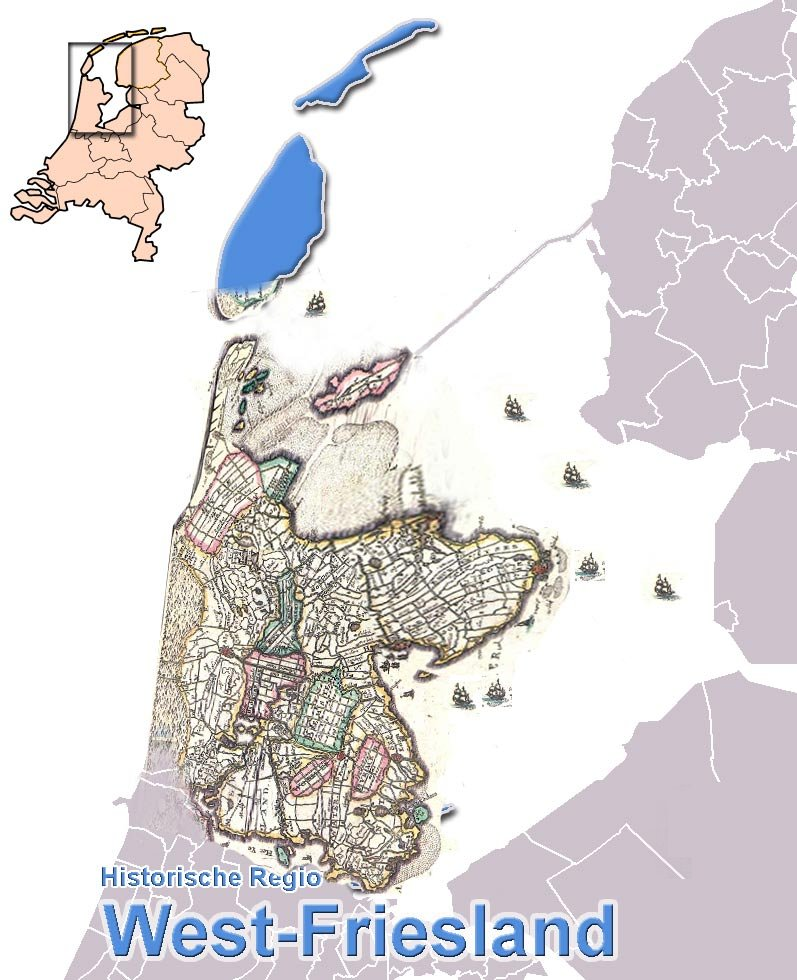
Historical region of West Friesland in North Holland

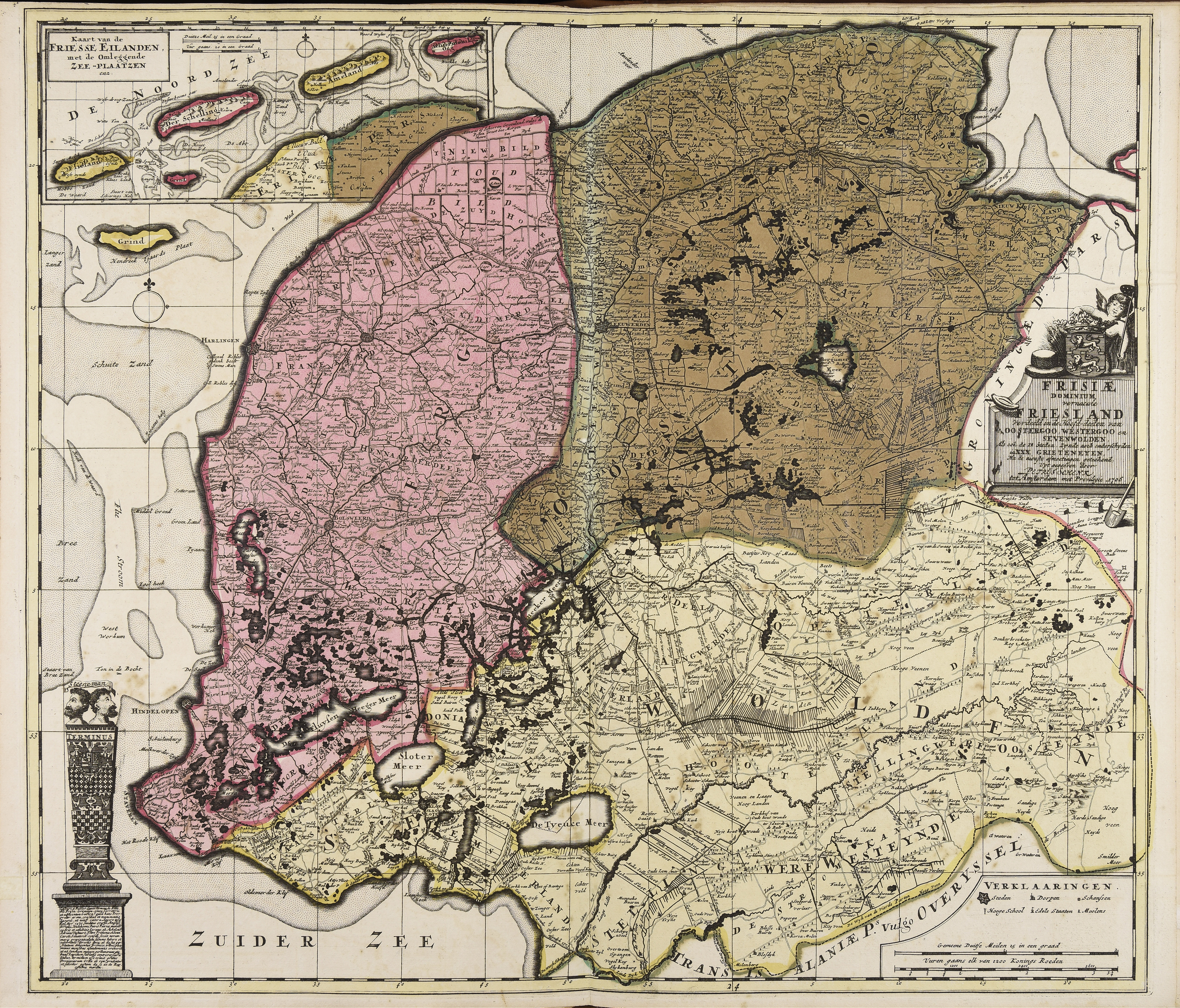
Lordship of Frisia (1706) divided into the gaue Westergo, Oostergo and Zevenwouden

Province of Fryslân, sometimes referred to as Westerlauwers Friesland

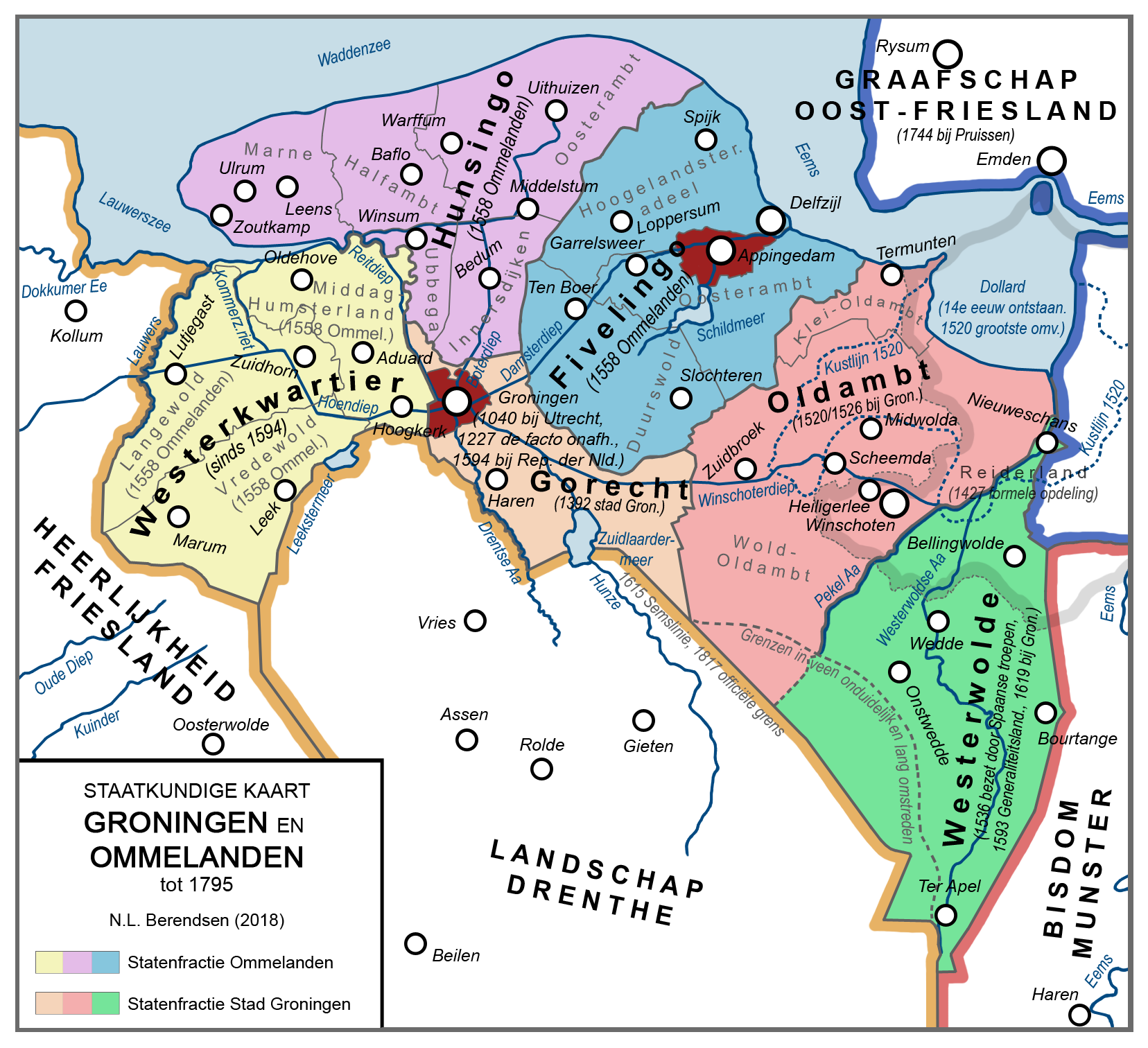
The Ommelanden in the province of Groningen

== See also ==
- West Frisians
- West Frisian Dutch
- West Frisian Islands
