= North Frisians =

Ethnic group in Germany

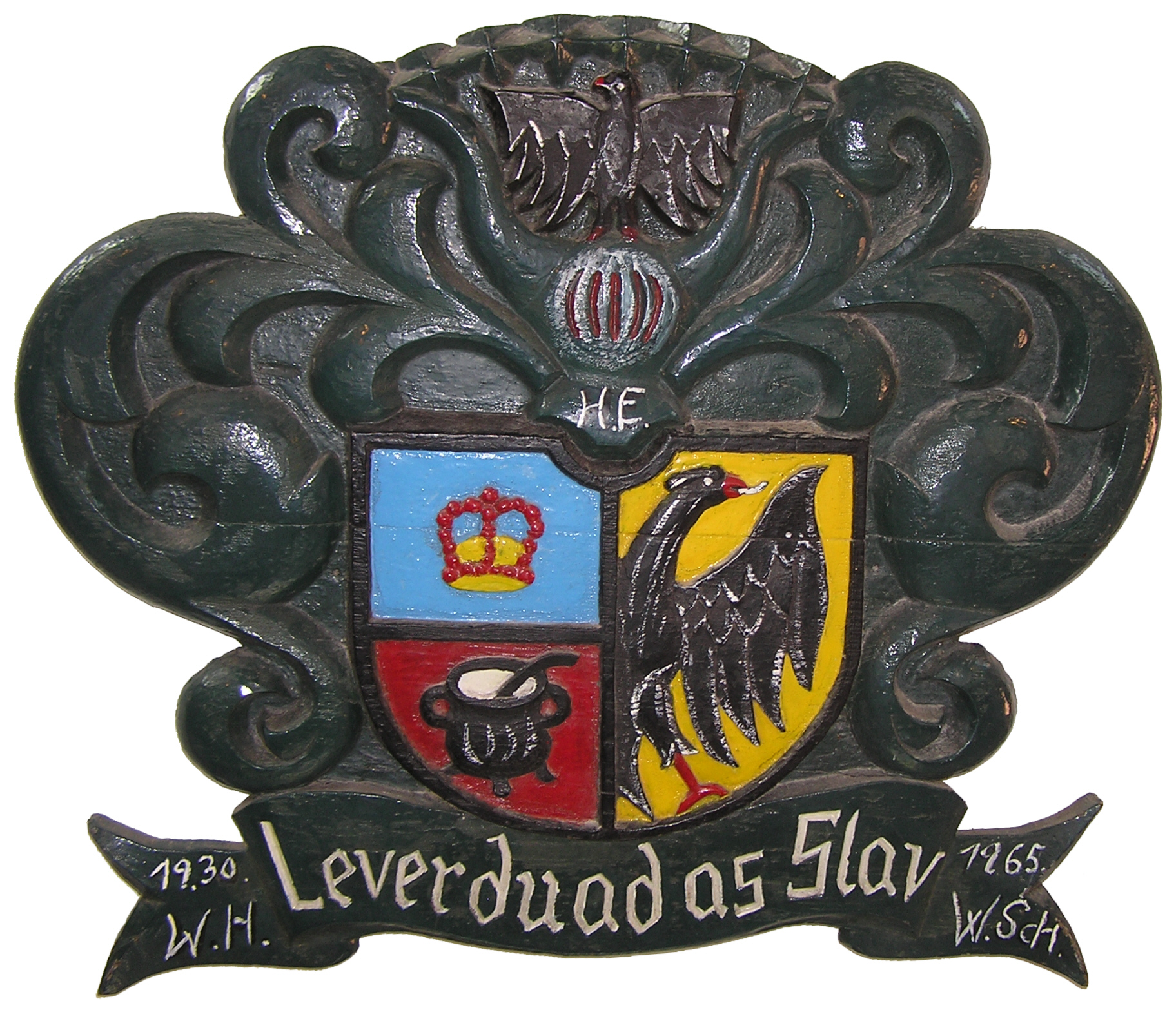
The coat of arms of North Frisia and the motto "Lever duad as Slav" (Better dead than slave!). The coat of arms of North Frisia is not identical with that of the district of Nordfriesland.

The North Frisian flag has like the coat of arms of North Frisia, the Friisk Gesäts, official status.

North Frisians (German: Nordfriesen; Danish: Nordfrisere; North Frisian: Nuurdfresen) are the inhabitants of the district of Nordfriesland in the north German state of Schleswig-Holstein. Used in a narrower sense, the term also refers to an ethnic sub-group of the Frisians from the region of North Frisia, which lies primarily on the German North Sea coast, and on the island of Heligoland.

The North Frisians live on the west coast of Schleswig-Holstein – from the German-Danish border region in the north to the south of North Friesland. The North Frisian language area also includes the offshore islands of Sylt, Föhr, Amrum and Heligoland (in the district of Pinneberg) and a number of smaller islands, the Halligen.

The North Frisians still to some extent use the different dialects of the North Frisian language and Low German language which form parts of the group of the Northseegermanic languages, but also High German and Danish. The North Frisian language is specially protected by the Schleswig-Holstein state constitution and by the Friisk Gesäts (German: Friesisch-Gesetz) or "Frisian Law".

Around 800 AD, the Frisians migrated into what later became Uthlande in the Duchy of Schleswig. Initially they only settled the offshore islands but, in a second wave of immigration around 1100, also populated the adjacent coastal strip between the rivers Eider and Vidå (German: Wiedau) on the Germano-Danish border.

The colours gold, red and blue, like the coat of arms of North Frisia (which are not the same as those of the district of Nordfriesland), have been accorded official status by the Friisk Gesäts.

== See also ==
- Saterland Frisians
- East Frisians
- West Frisians
