= Saterland =

Saterland Seelterlound
- Municipality
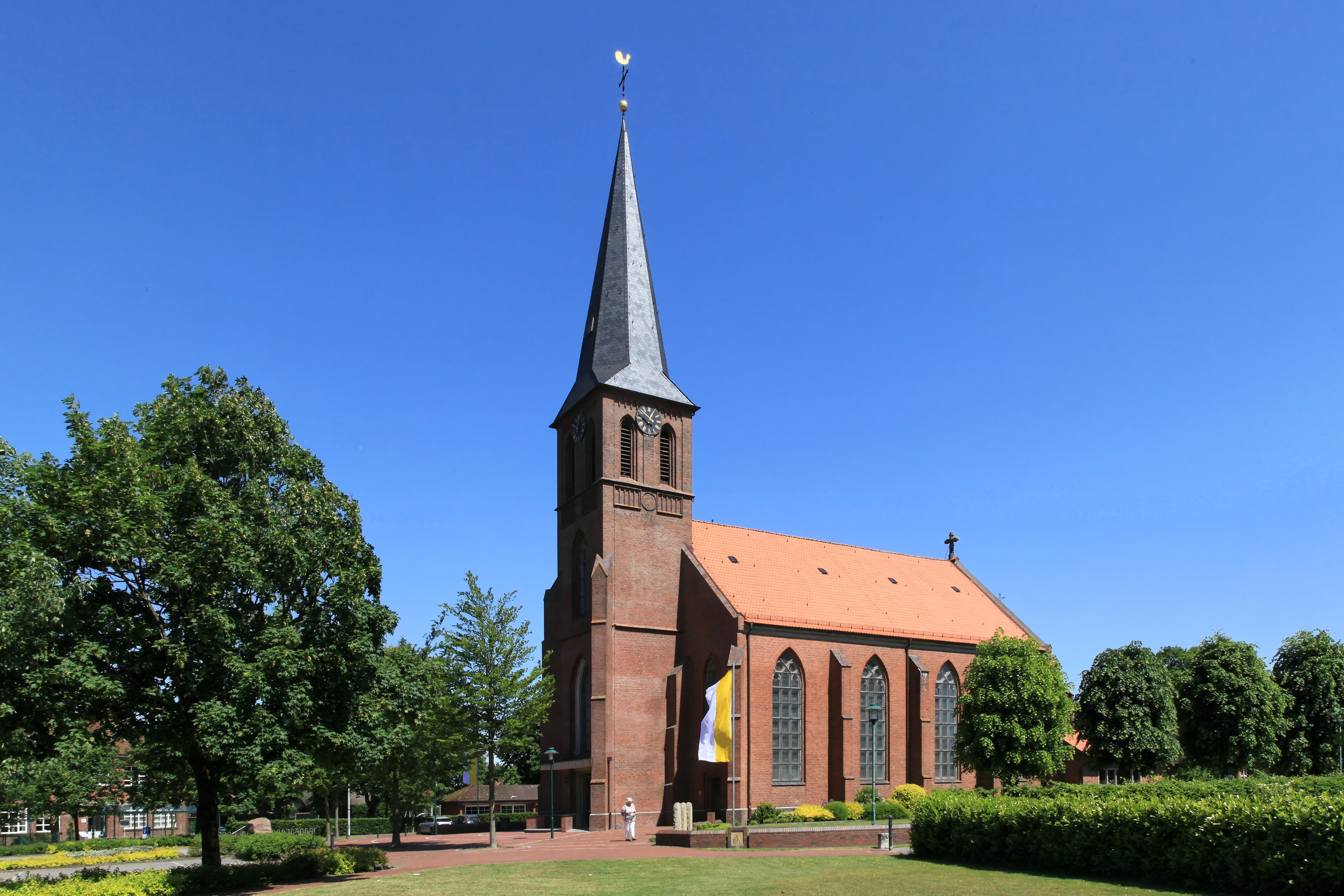
- Church of Saints Peter and Paul

- Flag Coat of arms

- Location of Saterland within Cloppenburg district
- Interactive map of Saterland
- Location within Germany Location within Lower Saxony
- Coordinates: 53°2′N 7°43′E
- Country: Germany
- State: Lower Saxony
- District: Cloppenburg
- Subdivisions: 4 districts

Government
  - Mayor (2018–23): Thomas Otto (Greens)

Area
  - Total: 123.6 km^{2} (47.7 sq mi)
- Elevation: 5 m (16 ft)

Population (2025-12-31)
  - Total: 14,340
  - Density: 116.0/km^{2} (300.5/sq mi)
- Time zone: UTC+01:00 (CET)
  - Summer (DST): UTC+02:00 (CEST)
- Postal codes: 26683
- Dialling codes: 0 44 92 (Scharrel, Sedelsberg) 0 44 98 (Ramsloh, Strücklingen)
- Vehicle registration: CLP
- Website: www.saterland.de

Saterland (German pronunciation: [ˈzaːtɐˌlant]; Saterland Frisian: Seelterlound, pronounced [ˈseːltɐˌloːunt]) is a municipality in the district of Cloppenburg, in Lower Saxony, Germany. It is situated between the cities of Leer, Cloppenburg, and Oldenburg. It is home to Saterland Frisians, who speak Frisian in addition to German and Low German.

The municipality of Saterland was formed in 1974, when the smaller municipalities Strücklingen (Strukelje in Saterland Frisian), Ramsloh (Roomelse), Sedelsberg (Seeidelsbierich) and Scharrel (Schäddel) were merged.

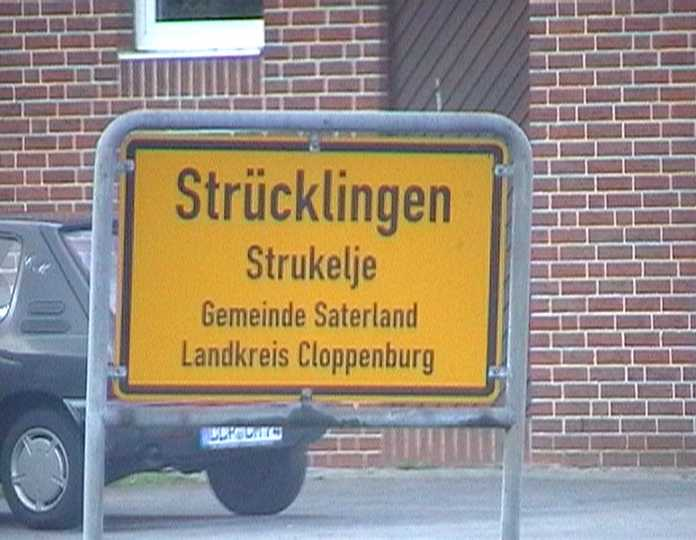
A bilingual road sign in German and Saterland Frisian

== History ==
In medieval times, the Saterland was a sandy region occupying an area of about 15 km long by 1–4 km wide surrounded by marshes. It was settled between the 10th and 13th centuries by Frisians from East Frisia. Being relatively isolated, the inhabitants developed their own form of the East Frisian language, Saterland Frisian, which survives to this day. The "Saterfriesen," as the speakers of this language are called in German, are the smallest minority recognized by the federal government.

== Notable places ==
On the area of the municipality of Saterland is the VLF transmitter DHO38, a large VLF transmitter of the German Navy for sending commands to submarines.
