= Frisians =

Ethnic group native to Germany and the Netherlands

Frisians Friezen (West), Fresen (North), Fräisen (Sater)
Total population
- c. 530,000

Regions with significant populations
- Friesland: 350,000 (Note: Number is the number of native West Frisian speakers.)
- Netherlands (excluding Friesland): 120,000 (Note: Native West Frisian speakers excluding those in Friesland.)
- Germany: 60,000 (Note: Although only 12,000 are native speakers.)
- Canada: 4,590 residents of Canada reported having Frisian ancestry in the 2016 Canadian Census.
- United States: 2,145 (ancestry estimate)

Languages
- Frisian languages Low Saxon (Friso-Saxon dialects); Dutch (West Frisian Dutch and Stadsfries); German (Missingsch); Danish (Sønderjysk and Southern Schleswig Danish)

Religion
- Protestant majority (Calvinists and Lutherans), Catholic minority

Related ethnic groups
- Danes; Dutch; Germans

The Frisians (/ˈfriːʒənz/ FREEZH-ənz) are an ethnic group indigenous to Northwestern Europe on the coastal regions of northern Netherlands, north-western Germany and southwestern Denmark. They inhabit an area known as Frisia and are concentrated in the Dutch province of Friesland and, in Germany, East Frisia and North Frisia (which was a part of Denmark until 1864).

The Frisian languages are spoken by more than 500,000 people; West Frisian is officially recognised in the Netherlands (in the Dutch province Friesland) while North Frisian and Saterland Frisian are recognised as regional languages in Germany.

== Name ==
The name of the Frisians is derived from the Roman-era name of the Frisii that inhabited a part of the same region until the 3rd century. Many proposals have been made about the etymology, most of which assumed that the early Frisii spoke a Germanic language, but this is today doubted, and no consensus exists about any of the proposals. Günter Neumann lists the following significant proposals:

- "The free", "kinsmen", or "the beloved": Ramat and Krogmann connected the name with Gothic freis and Old High German frī ("free"), Gothic frijōn ("to love"), and the Indo-European root *prī- ("to love, be dear"). Their proposal did not explain the -s- in the ethnonym, but Neumann more proposed a nominal stem *priHes-, comparable to Sanskrit prayas- ("love, favour, joy"). Depending on the semantic development, he suggested possible meanings such as "those possessing freedom", "those belonging to the same stock", or "the beloved ones". He presented this as a possibility, rather than a proven etymology.
- "The daring" or "those exposed to danger": Johann Kaspar Zeuss, Jacob Grimm, Erdmann and Theodor Siebs connected the name with Gothic fraisan ("to try, test") and Old High German freisa ("danger"), interpreting it as "the daring" or "the brave"; Siebs more specifically proposed "those exposed to dangers at sea". Neumann regards this derivation as unconvincing.
- "The curly-haired": Jacob Grimm, Karl Müllenhoff, Rudolf Much, Jan de Vries and Helmut Birkhan connected the name with words such as Old Frisian frīsle or frēsle ("curl" or "tuft of hair"), interpreting it as "the curly-haired people". Neumann rejects this explanation because there is no independent evidence for such a characteristic Frisian hairstyle and because the relevant Romance words probably have a different origin.
- Producers or traders of woollen cloth: Kaspers connected the name with the same group of words but interpreted the underlying noun as a type of woollen fabric, suggesting that the Frisians were named after producing or selling it. This proposal depends on the same disputed word comparison and is likewise rejected by Neumann.
- A people of the frontier or outer edge: Several proposals interpreted the name geographically. Grienberger and Hellqvist connected it with Latin prīmus ("first, foremost") and reconstructed a place-name meaning "that which lies in front"; Ten Doornkaat-Koolman connected it with Frisian frese or frēse ("edge, border, strip"); and Törnqvist connected it, through metathesis, with Gothic and Old High German fera ("side, region"). Neumann regards all of these geographical explanations as linguistically untenable.
- A people named after cutting implements or earthworks: Loewenthal connected the name with Greek príōn ("saw") through a hypothetical Germanic word meaning "harpoon point". Krogmann later related it to Swiss German fries ("ditch-digger, dyke-builder, earthworker"), interpreting the Frisians as the ditch-diggers or dyke-builders of the marshes. Neumann notes that the necessary Germanic word for "harpoon point" is unattested and that the Swiss term may instead have referred secondarily to Frisian specialist workers.
- A pre-Germanic substrate name: Hans Kuhn interpreted the ethnonym within his hypothetical Nordwestblock theory as a pre-Germanic name that was later adapted to Germanic. He compared it with a wide range of Latin, Celtic, Balkan Indo-European and Greek names. Neumann strongly rejects this proposal because the comparisons are linguistically heterogeneous and Kuhn supplied no clear semantic explanation.

== Languages ==
Present-day distribution of the Frisian languages in Europe: West Frisian North Frisian Saterland Frisian

The language of the Roman-era Frisii is uncertain, but the early medieval Frisians had a material culture related to that of the Anglo-Saxons in Britain, and used a very similar language, together forming the Anglo-Frisian family of West Germanic. Old Frisian is the most closely related language to Old English. Modern Frisian dialects have been strongly influenced by Dutch and German, but they are still the closest related languages to contemporary English that do not themselves derive from Old English, even though modern Frisian and English are not mutually intelligible.

The Frisian language group is divided into three languages:

- West Frisian, spoken in the Dutch province of Friesland
- Saterland Frisian, spoken in the German municipality of Saterland just south of East Frisia
- North Frisian, spoken in the German region of North Frisia (within the Kreis of Nordfriesland) on the west coast of Jutland.

Of these three languages both Saterland Frisian (2,000 speakers) and North Frisian (10,000 speakers) are endangered. West Frisian is spoken by around 350,000 native speakers in Friesland, and as many as 470,000 when including speakers in neighbouring Groningen province. West Frisian is not listed as threatened, although research published by Radboud University in 2016 has challenged that assumption.

== History ==
=== Roman era Frisii ===
The name of the modern and medieval Frisians is derived from the Roman-era Frisii, who lived on the North Sea coast stretching from the Rhine delta to the delta of the River Ems, roughly including the modern Dutch provinces of North Holland, Friesland and Groningen. They first appear in Roman accounts in connection with Drusus's campaign of 12 BC, and later Roman authors describe them as living north of the Rhine frontier. They were not part of a Roman province, but they sometimes acted as Roman allies, opponents, taxpayers or soldiers. The Roman fort of Flevum was within Frisian territory.

The last clear Roman-era references to the Frisii belong to the late third and early fourth centuries. The Latin panegyric to Constantius Chlorus describes defeated Frisii and Chamavi who had moved into the Rhine delta being settled in other parts of the Empire, and Roman inscriptions continue to show Frisian military units in Britain in the third century. Seebold suggested that some Frisii may have joined the Franks, while others served as Roman soldiers or settled away from the old coastal homeland, while those who remained in the homeland became part of a new culture related to that of the Anglo-Saxons who settled in Britain.

=== Disappearance of the Frisii name ===
After the third century, written sources no longer mention the Frisii name, and regular early medieval use of the names Frisia and Frisian begins only in the seventh century, after a gap of more than 300 years. Archaeology suggests that this gap coincided with major population decline and cultural change in the coastal regions previously associated with the Frisii, followed by renewed growth from the fifth century onward. The name of the medieval Frisians is difficult to interpret, because it may reflect local survival, newcomers adopting the name of an older region or people, or outside reuse of a name known from classical geography.

Population decline appears to have begun in the third century and reached its lowest point in the fourth. In the northern terp region, including modern Friesland and Groningen, settlement declined after about AD 250 and the coastal area gradually depopulated from west to east, with only some settlements continuing into the early fourth century. In South Holland and North Holland the pattern also changed sharply, although some sites show continuity or later renewed occupation. The evidence supports major demographic and cultural disruption, but not the proven disappearance of every earlier inhabitant.

The new settlement phase in the fifth century is associated with cultural links to the north-western German coastal area, including pottery styles associated with areas to the east in what is now Germany (and sometimes referred to by archaeologists as an "Anglo-Saxon-style"). However, pottery fabrics do not by themselves prove migration or importation. At continuity sites, local potters may have adopted new decoration styles, while much of the wider repopulation of the terp region probably involved immigrants from the north-western German coastal area mixed with people from areas where occupation had continued. Ezinge near Groningen is one of the main examples used to show that the northern coastal region did not follow a single pattern of total abandonment.

=== Reappearance of Frisians in early medieval sources ===
The first post-Roman references to Frisians are uncertain. None of the sixth-century references to Frisians is without problems.

Procopius, writing in the mid-sixth century, names the Frisians as Phrisones and lists them with the Angles and Britons among the peoples of the island of Brittia. He does not place them on the continent, and his northern geography is difficult to use as evidence for Frisia itself.

Around 580, Venantius Fortunatus uses the word Fresonibus, (with Frisonibus as a variant reading), to mean "of the Frisians". This was in a poem for the Merovingian king Chilperic I, in a poetic list of peoples subject to Frankish power: terror [es] extremis Fresonibus ... atque Suevis, "you are a terror to the farthest Frisians ... and Suebi". However, such lists could revive old ethnic names for literary effect.

Frisians appear in Beowulf and related heroic material. Finn is named as a Frisian ruler in the Finnsburg episode. Beowulf also describes Scandinavian invaders invading the Lower Rhine region, where Hygelac, King of the Geats was killed by Frankish forces. The Beowulf poet calls the raid a fight with Frisians (fæhðe to Frysum). Gregory of Tours apparently records the same raid, referring to a "Danish" king with the similar name, Chlochilaichus, but he does not mention Frisians. For this reason, the Frisian material in Beowulf is usually treated as later literary evidence rather than as a direct record of the Migration period.

Coins with legends such as AVDVLFVS FRISIA and FRISIA AVDVLFVS may show use of the name Frisia around 600, but their interpretation and place of production are disputed.

The seventh-century Ravenna Cosmography gives clearer geographical evidence for the name, although it probably drew on older Roman geographical material. It refers to Frisians as Frisones and Frixos, and to their land as the patria Frigonum. It places this land on the Ocean coast between the Franks on the Rhine, and Saxony, and says that the Rhine enters the Ocean below Dorestad in the patria Frigonum. The author indicates that older sources had described the country without naming it, but he had found the name Frigonum in the work of a Gothic scholar named Marcomir. He also mentions that some people say it has no cities. However, apart from Dorestad he names two more cities which he found in old sources, Bordonchar and Nocdac.

Clearer and more regular use of the names Frisia and Frisians begins in the seventh century, especially in Frankish and missionary contexts.

=== 7th/8th century Frisia ===
In the seventh and eighth centuries, Frisia referred to a broad coastal zone around the southern North Sea, wider than the modern Frisian-speaking areas. This period was marked by maritime trade, cattle-breeding, local rulers, missionary activity, and conflict with the expanding Frankish kingdom. Frisian influence in North Sea trade led some contemporary non-Frisian documents to refer to the North Sea as the Frisian Sea (Latin: Mare Frisicum), and in Dorestad the term Frisian could mean a merchant, not necessarily an ethnic Frisian.

Frankish interest in the old Roman frontier zone is shown by King Dagobert I's church at Utrecht around 630, and by Frankish activity at Dorestad, which became one of the main trading centres of the region. Bede records that the Anglo-Saxon bishop Wilfrid was received by the first clearly named Frisian ruler Aldgisl in 678 and was allowed to preach among the Frisians.

The political status of early medieval Frisian rulers is described differently in different sources. Frankish sources tended to treat figures such as Aldgisl and Radbod as duces or counts, while English sources called them reges, kings. Their power base is debated, but the political centre of early medieval Frisia was closely connected with the Rhine delta, Utrecht and Dorestad.

In the late seventh century, Frankish expansion brought renewed conflict over Dorestad and the Rhine delta. Pepin II defeated Radbod and gained control at least as far as the Old Rhine, the area later known as Frisia Citerior, "nearer Frisia". Frisian resistance to Frankish rule and Christian mission continued into the eighth century. Radbod temporarily recovered power after Frankish setbacks, but after his death in 719 Charles Martel extended Frankish control over western Frisia. Missionaries such as Willibrord and Boniface worked in this frontier zone, although Boniface's death near Dokkum in 754 shows that the northern Frisian regions were not yet fully under Frankish Christian control.

=== Carolingian and later medieval Frisia ===
By the Carolingian period, Frisia was increasingly incorporated into the Frankish realm. The Lex Frisionum, usually dated to the late eighth or early ninth century, shows that Frisians were still treated as a distinct legal people within the Carolingian world. The text divides Frisia into western, middle and eastern regions, reflecting a broad coastal concept of Frisia rather than the boundaries of modern Friesland.

In the early eighth century, the Frisians still mostly worshipped Germanic gods such as Thor and Odin outside the vicinity of Utrecht.

The Frisian nobles came into increasing conflict with the Franks to their south, resulting in a series of wars in which the Frankish Empire eventually subjugated Frisia in 734. These wars benefited attempts by Anglo-Irish missionaries (which had begun with Saint Boniface) to convert the Frisian populace to Christianity, in which Saint Willibrord largely succeeded.

Frisian resistance to Frankish rule and Christian mission continued into the eighth century. Radbod temporarily recovered power after Frankish setbacks, but after his death in 719 Charles Martel extended Frankish control over western Frisia. Missionaries such as Willibrord and Boniface worked in this frontier zone, although Boniface's death near Dokkum in 754 shows that the northern Frisian regions were not yet fully under Frankish Christian control.

Some time after the death of Charlemagne, the Frisian territories were in theory under the control of the Count of Holland, but in practice the Hollandic counts, starting with Count Arnulf in 993, were unable to assert themselves as the sovereign lords of Frisia. The resulting stalemate resulted in a period of time called the Frisian freedom, a period in which feudalism and serfdom (as well as central or judicial administration) did not exist; the Frisian lands only owed their allegiance to the Holy Roman Emperor.

During the 13th century the counts of Holland became increasingly powerful and, starting in 1272, sought to reassert themselves as rightful lords of the Frisian lands in a series of wars, which (with a series of lengthy interruptions) ended in 1422 with the Hollandic conquest of Western Frisia and with the establishment of a more powerful noble class in Central and Eastern Frisia.

=== Early modern Frisia ===
In 1524, Frisia became part of the Seventeen Provinces and in 1568 joined the Dutch revolt against Philip II, king of Spain, heir of the Burgundian territories; Central Frisia has remained a part of the Netherlands ever since. The eastern periphery of Frisia would become part of various German states (later Germany) and Denmark. An old tradition existed in the region of exploitation of peatlands.

== Connection with the Anglo-Saxons of Britain ==
Though it is impossible to know exact numbers and migration patterns, research has indicated that many Frisians were part of the wave of ethnic groups to colonise areas of present-day England alongside the Angles, Saxons and Jutes, starting from around the fifth century when Frisians arrived along the coastline of Kent.

Frisians principally settled in modern-day Kent, East Anglia, the East Midlands, North East England, and Yorkshire. Across these areas, evidence of their settlement includes place names of Frisian origin, such as Frizinghall in Bradford and Frieston in Lincolnshire.

Similarities in dialect between Great Yarmouth and Friesland have been noted, originating from trade between these areas during the Middle Ages. Frisians are also known to have founded the Freston area of Ipswich.

In Scotland, historians have noted that colonies of Angles and Frisians settled as far north as the River Forth. This corresponds to those areas of Scotland which historically constituted part of Northumbria.

== Frisians in Denmark ==
The earliest traces of Frisians in modern-day Denmark date back from the 8th century, when Frisian traders and craftsmen settled down in Ribe. In the Later Middle Ages, Frisian farmers settled around Tøndermarsken west of Tønder. The evidence for this are the dwelling mounds or terps (værfter) in the area that are built after the same method as the ones alongside the Wadden Sea further south. Colonists from the south also settled down in Misthusum in the Ballum marshes near Skærbæk during the 12th of 13th century. According to documents around 1400 at least some of them were considered as "Hollanders".

In modern times, Frisian culture in Denmark is described as assimilated and most people of Frisian descent do not consider themselves Frisian. In regards of the Frisian language, very few may speak it as first language but it was traditionally spoken in several polder hamlets near the border with Germany. One estimate puts the Frisian population in Denmark somewhere between 2,000 and 5,000. This number, however, might be grossly exaggerated. Frisian identity in Denmark was promoted by the Eiderstedt farmer and political activist Cornelius Petersen, who built a traditional Frisian farmstead in Møgeltønder in 1914 and founded the rural protest movement Bondens Selvstyre ("Farmers' self-government"). More recently, the retired journalist Benny Siewertsen wrote a partisan pamphlet on Frisian heritage in Denmark.

== Identity ==
Today, there exists a tripartite division of North, East and West Frisians; this was caused by Frisia's continual loss of territory in the Middle Ages. The West Frisians, in general, do not see themselves as part of a larger group of Frisians, and, according to a 1970 poll, identify themselves more with the Dutch than with the East or North Frisians.

Frisian traditional costumes

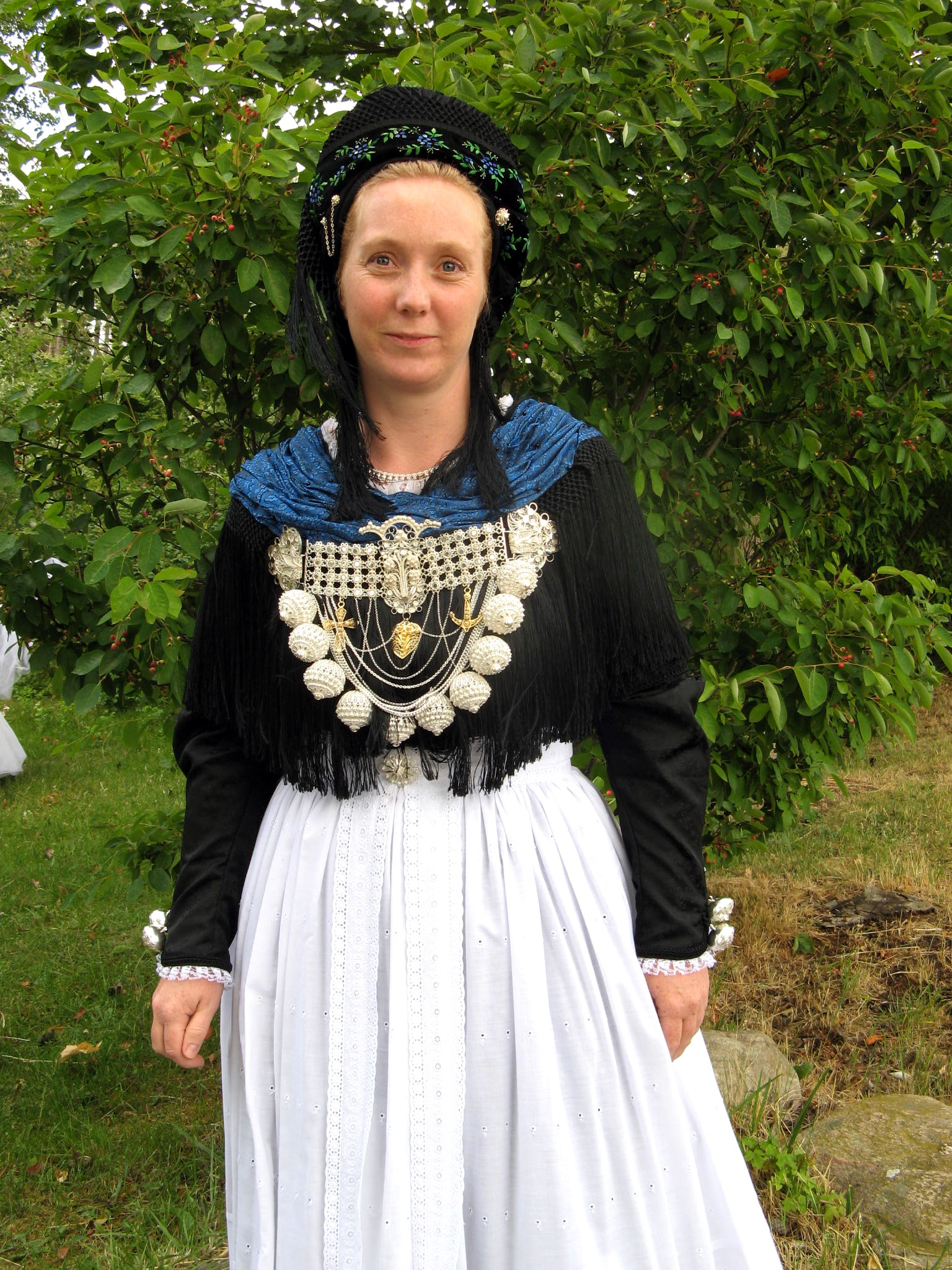
North Frisian woman in Föhr.

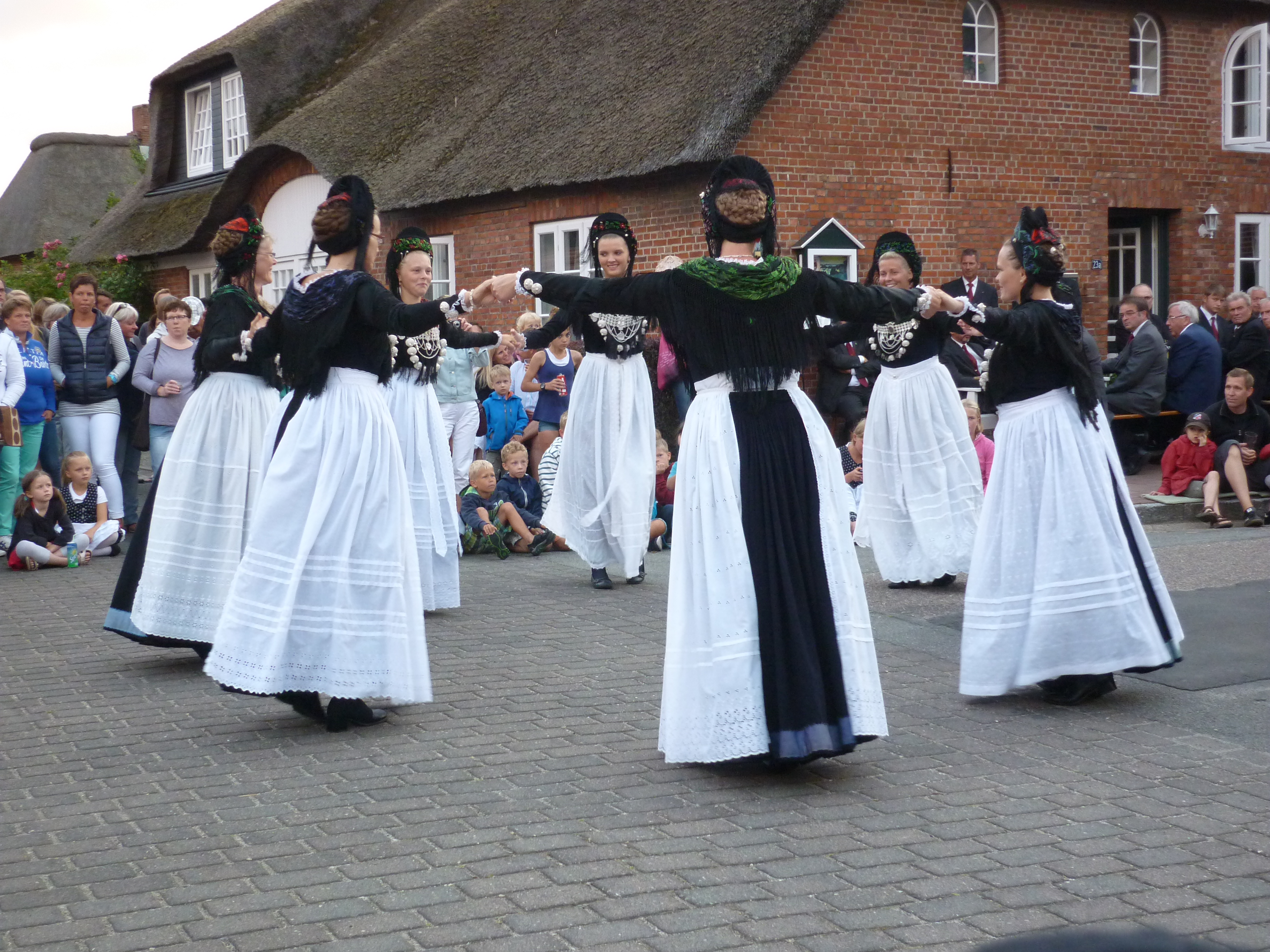
Frisians in traditional costumes in Oldsum.

== See also ==
- Frisian Americans
- Frisian church in Rome
- Frisian Islands
- Friso-Saxon dialects
  - East Frisian Low Saxon
  - Gronings
  - Stellingwarfs
- Frisian revolt of 28 AD
- Ingvaeonic languages
- List of Frisians
- List of Germanic tribes
