= East Frisia =

Historic region in Lower Saxony, Germany

East Frisia Ostfriesland
- Flag Coat of arms
- Motto: Eala frya Fresena "Stand up, free Frisians"
- East Frisia in northwestern Lower Saxony
- Coordinates: 53°28′12″N 7°29′24″E
- Country: Germany
- State: Lower Saxony
- Districts: Aurich; Emden; Leer; Wittmund

Area
  - Total: 3,142 km^{2} (1,213 sq mi)

Population (31 December 2020)
  - Total: 468,919
  - Density: 149.2/km^{2} (386.5/sq mi)
- Demonym: East Frisian
- Time zone: UTC+01:00 (CET)
  - Summer (DST): UTC+02:00 (CEST)

East Frisia (/ˈfriːʒə/) or East Friesland (/ˈfriːzlənd/; German: Ostfriesland; East Frisian Low Saxon: Oostfräisland; Saterland Frisian: Aastfräislound) is a historic region in the northwest of Lower Saxony, Germany. It is primarily located on the western half of the East Frisian peninsula, to the east of West Frisia and to the west of Landkreis Friesland.

Administratively, East Frisia consists of the districts Aurich, Leer and Wittmund, and the city of Emden. It has a population of approximately 469,000 people and an area of 3,142 square kilometres (1,213 sq mi).

There is a chain of islands off the coast, called the East Frisian Islands (German: Ostfriesische Inseln). From west to east, these islands are Borkum, Juist, Norderney, Baltrum, Langeoog and Spiekeroog.

== History ==
The geographical region of East Frisia was inhabited in Paleolithic times by reindeer hunters of the Hamburg culture. Later there were Mesolithic and Neolithic settlements of various cultures. The period after prehistory can only be reconstructed from archaeological evidence. Access to the early history of East Frisia is possible in part through archaeology and in part through the studying of external sources such as Roman documents. The first proven historical event was the arrival of a Roman fleet under Drusus in 12 BC; the ships sailed into the course of the Ems river and returned.

The earlier settlements, known solely through material remnants but whose people's name for themselves remains unknown, led up to the invasion of Germanic tribes belonging to the Ingvaeonic group. Those were Chauci mentioned by Tacitus, and Frisians. The region between the rivers Ems and Weser was thereupon inhabited by the Chauci; however, after the second century AD there is no mention of the Chauci. They were partly displaced by Frisian expansion after about 500, and were later partially absorbed into the Frisian society.

Saxons also settled the region and the East Frisian population of medieval times is based on a mixture of Frisian and Saxon elements. Nevertheless, the Frisian element is predominant in the coastal area, while the population of the higher Geest area expresses more Saxon influence.

Historical information becomes clearer by early Carolingian time, when a Frisian kingdom united the whole area from present-day West Frisia (the Dutch provinces of Friesland and Groningen and part of North Holland) throughout East Frisia up to the river Weser. It was ruled by kings like the famous Radbod whose known names were still mentioned in folk tales until recent times. Frisia was a short-lived kingdom, and it was crushed by Pippin of Herstal in 689. East Frisia then became part of the Frankish Empire. Charles the Great then divided East Frisia into two counties. At this time, Christianization by the missionaries Liudger and Willehad started; one part of East Frisia became a part of the diocese of Bremen, the other the diocese of Münster.

With the decay of the Carolingian empire, East Frisia lost its former bindings, and a unity of independent self-governed districts was established. Their elections were held every year to choose the "Redjeven" (councillors), who had to be judges as well as administrators or governors. This system prevented the establishment of a feudalistic system in East Frisia during medieval times. Frisians regarded themselves as free people not obliged to any foreign authority. This period is called the time of the "Friesische Freiheit" (Frisian freedom) and is represented by the still well-known salute "Eala Frya Fresena" (Get Up, Free Frisian!) that affirmed the non-existence of any feudality. Frisian representatives of the many districts of the seven coastal areas of Frisia met once a year at the Upstalsboom, located at Rahe (near Aurich).

In the early Middle Ages, people could settle only on the higher situated Geest areas or by erecting in the marsh-areas "Warften", artificial hills to protect the settlement, whether a single farming estate or a whole village, against the North Sea floods.

In about 1000 AD the Frisians started building large dikes along the North Sea shore. This had a great effect on establishing a feeling of national identity and independence. Until the late Middle Ages Ostfriesland resisted the attempts of German states to conquer the coasts.

During the 14th century adherence to the Redjeven constitution decayed. Catastrophes and epidemics such as pestilence intensified the process of destabilization. This provided an opportunity for influential family-clans to establish a new rule. As chieftains (in Low German: "hovedlinge"; in standard German: "Fürsten") they took control over villages, cities, and regions in East Frisia; however, they still did not establish a feudal system as it was known in the rest of Europe. Instead, the system implemented in Frisia was a system of fellowship which has some similarity to older forms of rule known from Germanic cultures of the North. There was a specific relation of dependence between the inhabitants of the ruled area and the chieftain, but the people retained their individual freedom and could move where they wanted.

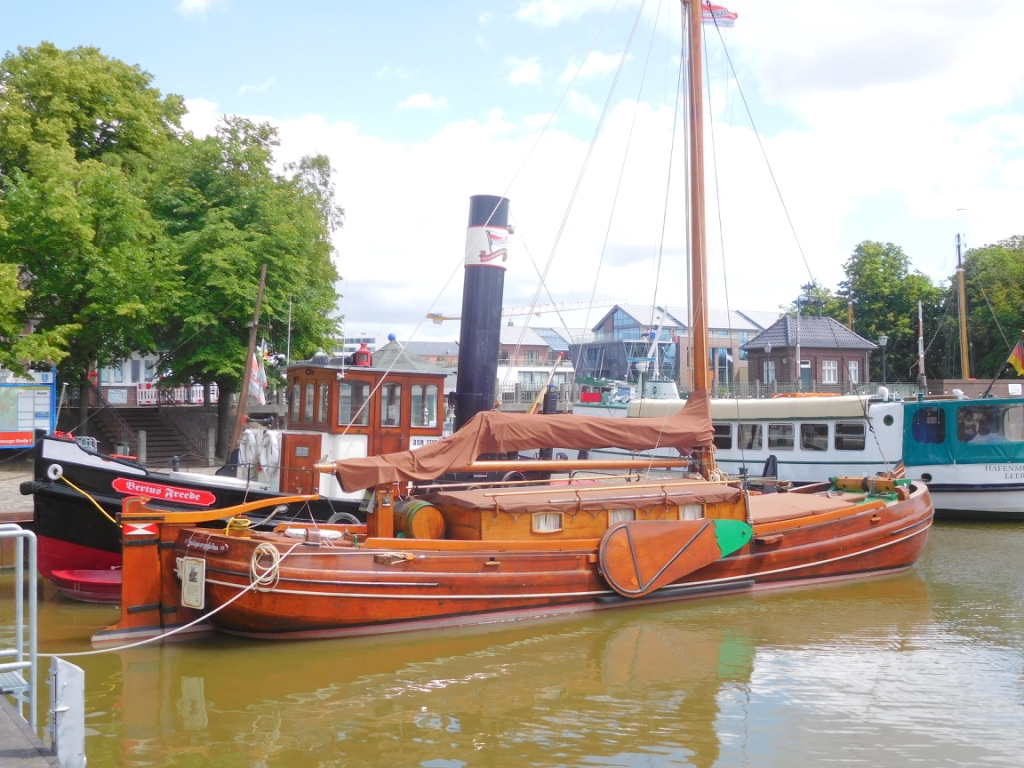
West bank of the Leda River in Leer

The Frisians controlled the mouth of the Ems river and threatened the ships coming down the river. For this reason the County of Oldenburg made several attempts to subjugate East Frisia during the 12th century. Thanks to the swampy terrain, the Frisian peasants defeated the Oldenburgian armies every time. In 1156 even Henry the Lion failed to conquer the region. The conflicts lasted for the next few centuries. In the 14th century Oldenburg gave up on plans to conquer Ostfriesland, restricting their attacks to irregular invasions, killing livestock then leaving.

The East Frisian chieftains used to provide shelter for pirates such as the famous Klaus Störtebeker and Gottfried Michaelsen, who were a threat to the ships of the powerful Hanseatic League which they attacked and robbed. In 1400 a punitive expedition of the Hanseatic League against East Frisia succeeded. The chieftains had to promise to discontinue their support for the pirates. In 1402 Störtebeker, who was not a Frisian by birth, was captured and executed in Hamburg.

The range of power and influence differed between the chieftains. Some clans achieved a predominant state. One of these was the Tom Broks from the Brokmerland (nowadays: Brookmerland) who ruled a large part of Eastern Friesland over several generations until a former follower, Focko Ukena from Leer, defeated the last Tom Brok. But a party of opposing chieftains under the leadership of the Cirksenas from Greetsiel defeated and expelled Fokko, who later died near Groningen.

After 1465 one of the last chieftains from the house of Cirksena was made a count by Emperor Frederick III and accepted the sovereignty of the Holy Roman Empire. However, in 1514 the emperor ordered that a duke of Saxony should be the heir to the count of East Frisia. Count Edzard of East Frisia refused to accept this order and was outlawed. Twenty-four German dukes and princes invaded Frisia with their armies. Despite their numerical superiority they failed to defeat Edzard, and in 1517 the emperor had to accept Edzard and his descendants as counts of East Frisia.

East Frisia played an important role in the Reformation period. Menno Simons, founder of the Mennonite church, found refuge there.

In 1654 the counts of East Frisia, seated at Aurich, were elevated to the rank of princes. Their power, however, remained limited because of a number of factors. Externally East Frisia became a satellite of the Netherlands, Dutch garrisons being stationed in different cities permanently. Important cities like Emden were autonomously administered by their citizens, the Prince not having much influence on them. A Frisian Parliament, the Ostfreesk Landschaft, was an assembly of different social groups of East Frisia, jealously protecting the traditional rights and freedoms of the Frisians against the Prince. East Frisian independence ended in 1744, when the region was taken over by Prussia after the last Cirksena prince had died without issue. There was no resistance to this takeover, since it had been arranged by contract beforehand. Prussia respected the traditional autonomy of the Frisians, governed by the Frisian chancellor Sebastian Homfeld.

In 1806 East Frisia (now called Oostfreesland) was annexed by the Napoleonic Kingdom of Holland and later became part of the French Empire. Most of East Frisia was renamed the Département Ems-Oriental, while a small strip of land, the Rheiderland, became part of the Dutch Département Ems-Occidental. The French Emperor Napoléon I undertook the greatest reform of Frisian society in history: He introduced mayors, where the local administration was still in the hands of autonomous groups of elders (like the Diekgreven, Kerkenolderlings etc.), introduced the Code Civil and reformed the ancient Frisian naming system by newly introducing family names in 1811. In the following years the East Frisians registered their family names, often depending on their father's name, area or (if unfree) master.

After the Napoleonic Wars East Frisia was occupied first by Prussian and then by Russian soldiers and in 1813 was it was re-annexed by Prussia. However, in 1815, Prussia had to cede East Frisia to the Kingdom of Hanover, which itself was annexed by Prussia in 1866.

=== Maps ===
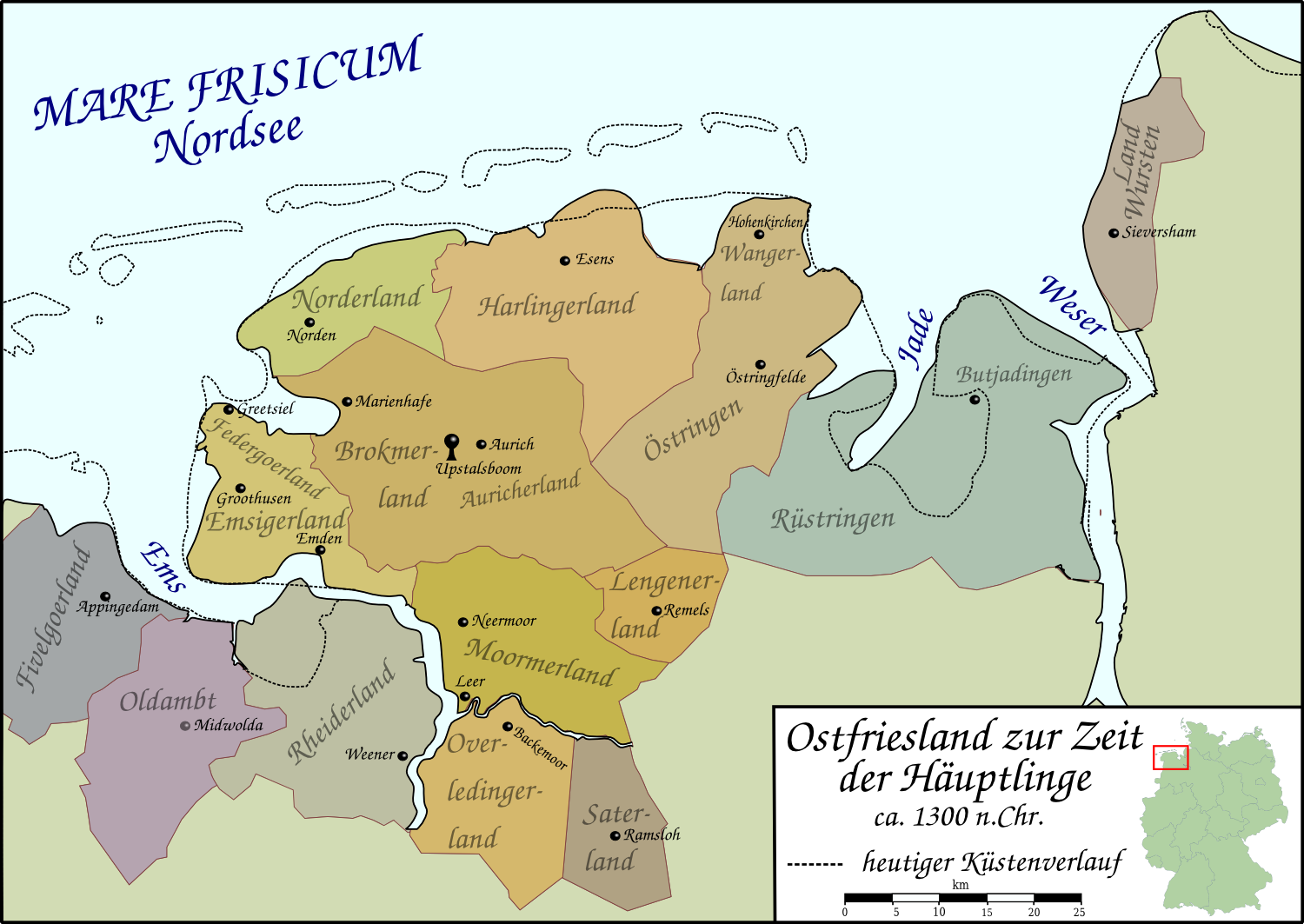
East Frisia at the time of East Frisian chieftains in 1300

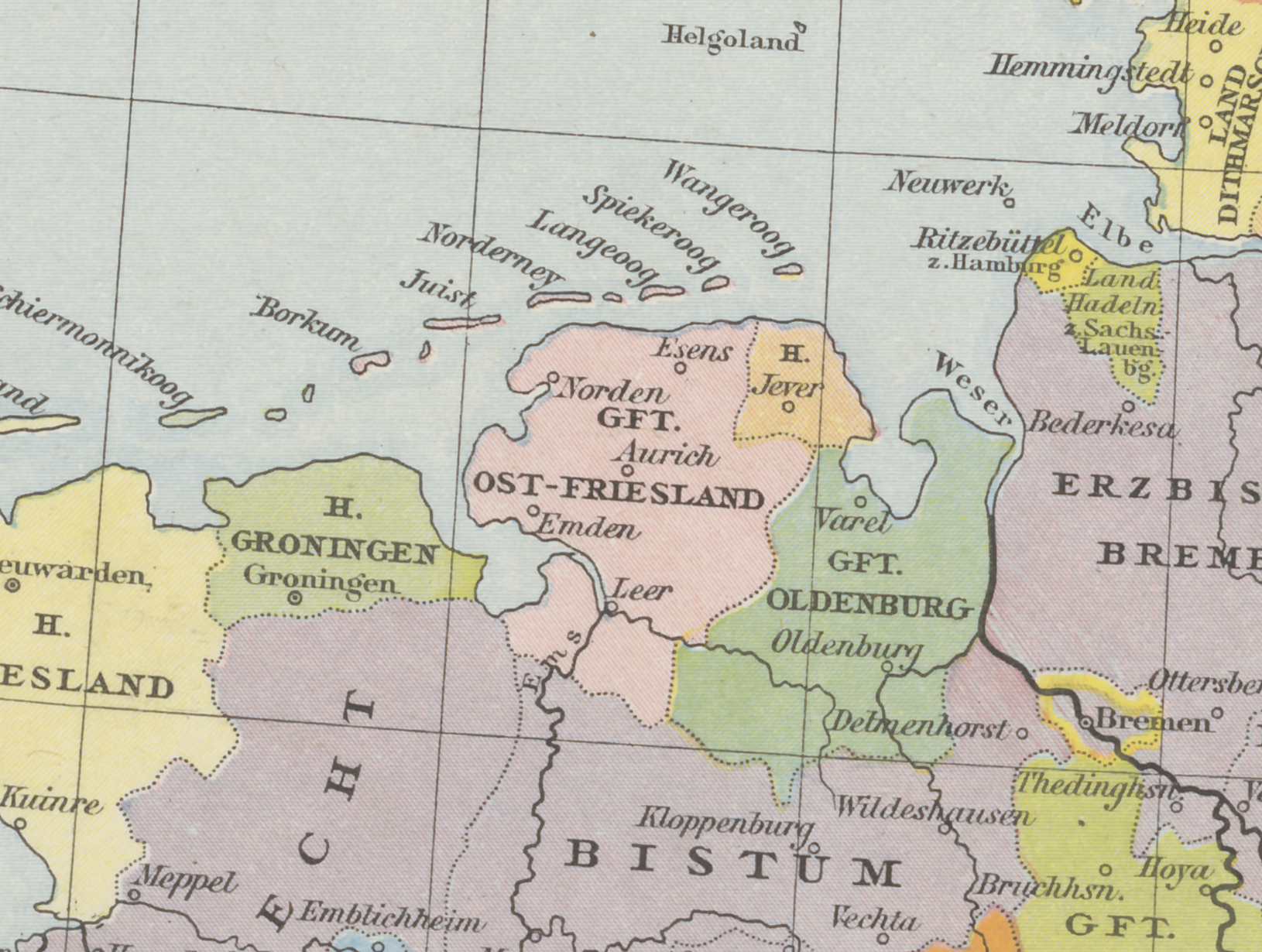
County of East Frisia in 1500

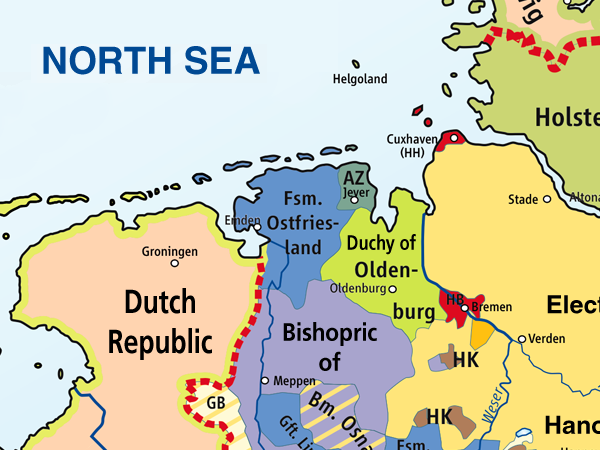
Principality of East Frisia within the Holy Roman Empire in 1789

Royal Dutch departement of Oost Friesland (upper right) in 1807

German Ostfriesland in 2008

== Geography ==
The landscape is influenced by its proximity to the North Sea. The East Frisian Islands stretch for 90 kilometres along the coast. They offer dunes and sand beaches, though in their center they have grass and woods as well. The area between the islands and the coast is unique in the world: the tide leaves a broad stretch of mudflat with creeks that attract an extraordinary number of species, worms and crabs as well as birds or seals. For this reason, the UNESCO World Heritage Fund declared the Wadden Sea, which had already been a national park, a global heritage site. Away from the coastal area, much of the physical geography is "Geest" and Heathland.

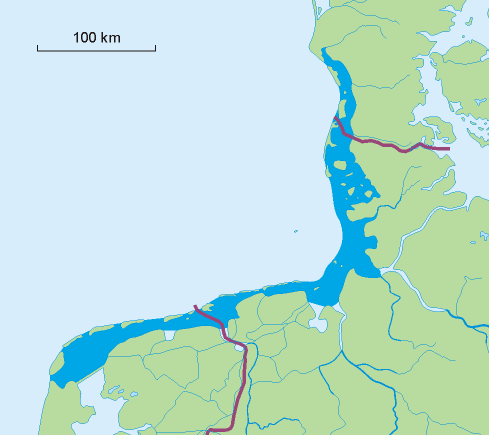
Wadden Sea

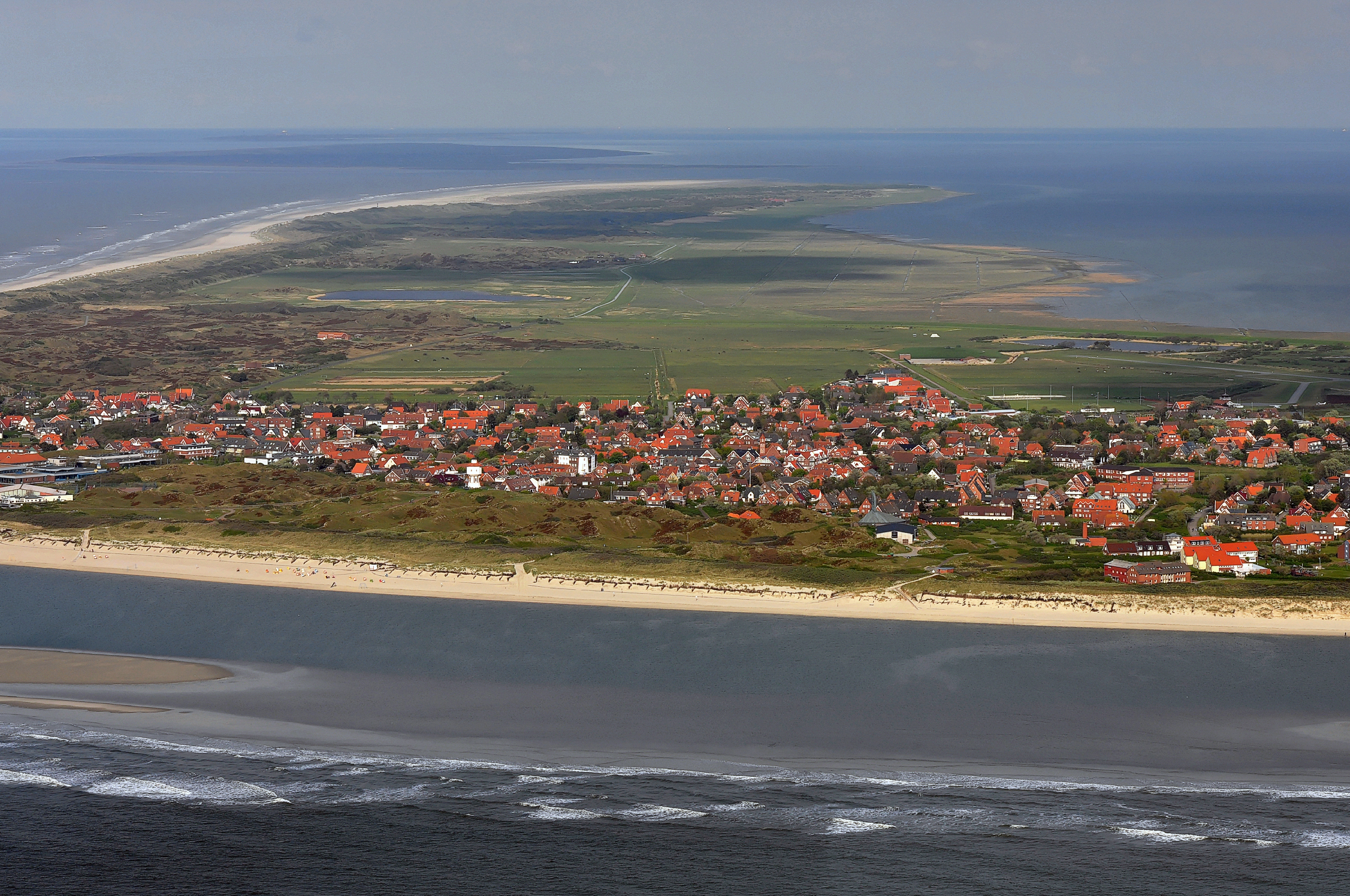
Aerial view of Langeoog

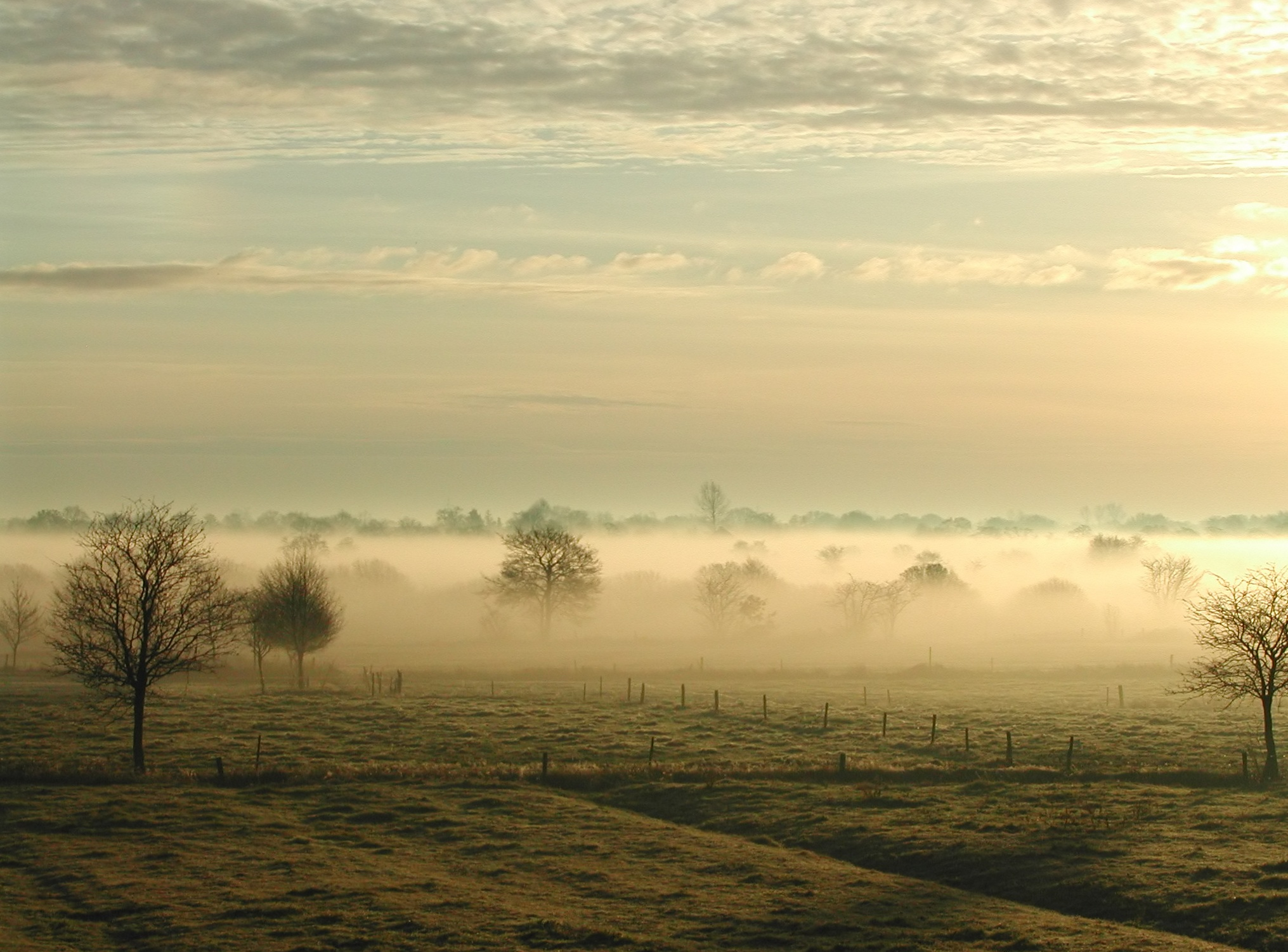
Morning fog in East Frisia, 2003

== Culture ==
=== Language ===
The original language of East Frisia was East Frisian, which now is almost extinct, largely replaced by East Frisian Low Saxon. Original East Frisian survived somewhat longer in several remote places as for example in the islands, such as Wangerooge. Today a modern variant of East Frisian can be found in the Saterland, a district near East Frisia. In former times people from East Frisia who left their homes under pressure had settled in that remote area surrounded by moors and kept their inherited language alive. This language which forms the smallest language-island in Europe is called Saterland Frisian or, by its own name, Seeltersk. It is spoken by about 1000 people.

East Frisian Low Saxon (or Eastern Friesland Low Saxon, as some people prefer to say for a better distinction from East Frisian, which is Frisian but not Low Saxon) is a variant of Low German with many of its own features due to the Frisian substrate and some other influences originating in the varied history of East Frisia. It is similar to the Gronings dialect spoken in the adjacent Netherlands province of Groningen.

In modern Germany, East Frisians in general are the traditional butt of ethnic jokes similar to Polish jokes in the United States. This is mainly the case in the North.

=== Tea ===
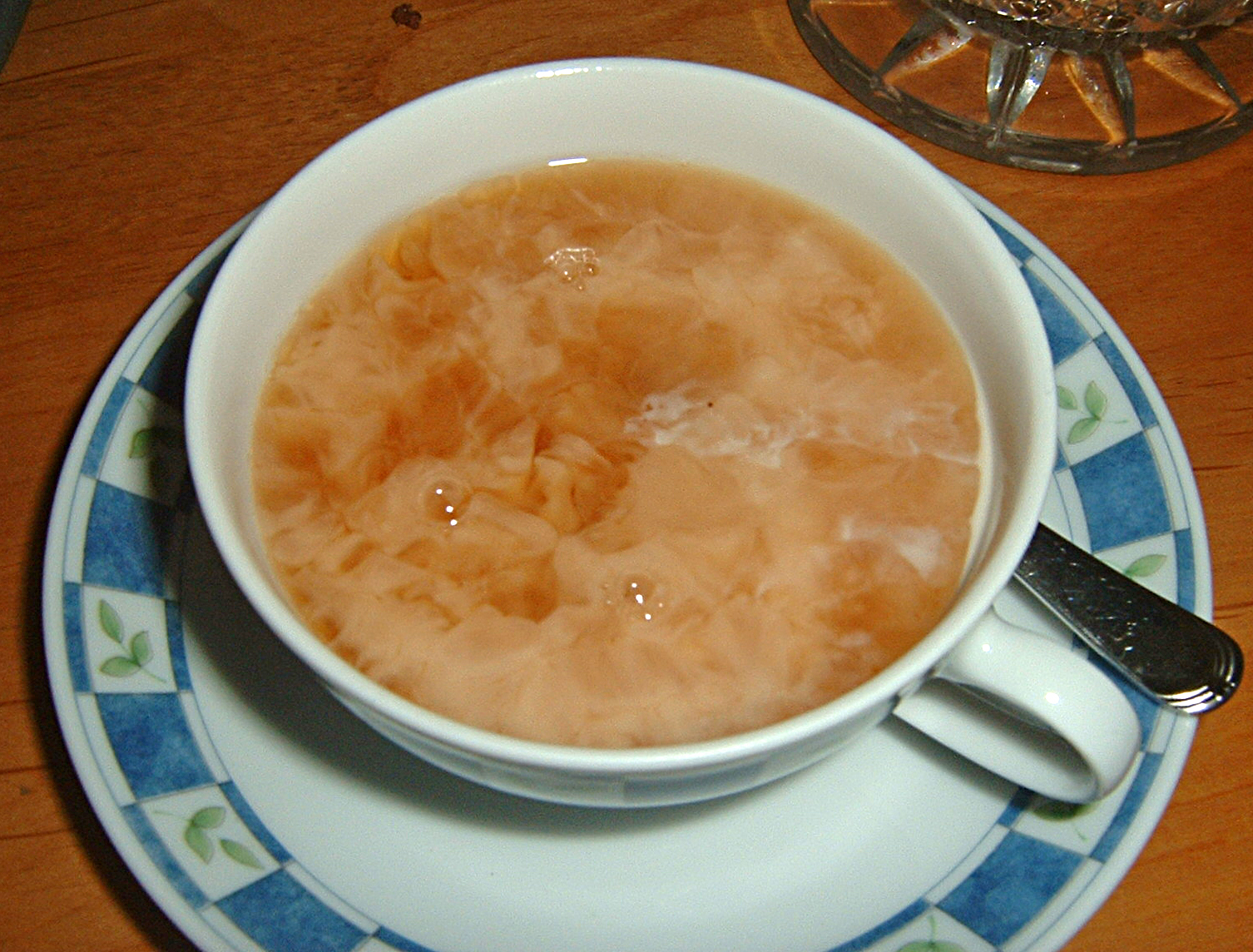
A cup of East Frisian tea with cream

In an otherwise coffee-drinking country, East Frisia is noted for its consumption of tea and its tea culture. Per capita, the East Frisian people drink more tea than any other people group, about 300 litres per person every year.

Strong black tea is served whenever there are visitors to an East Frisian home or other gathering, as well as with breakfast, in mid-afternoon and mid-evening. The tea is sweetened with kluntjes, a rock candy sugar that melts slowly, allowing multiple cups to be sweetened. Heavy cream is also used to flavour the tea. The tea is generally served in traditional small cups, with little cookies during the week and cake during special occasions or on weekends as a special treat. Some of the most common traditional cakes and pastries to accompany tea are apple strudel, black forest cake, and other cakes flavored with chocolate and hazelnut.

Brown rum, mixed with kluntjes and left for several months, is also added to black tea in the winter. The tea is alleged to cure headaches, stomach problems, and stress, among many other ailments.

The tea is not only a kind of beverage for the population, but also part of its cultural tradition. Over the years the region developed a unique tea ceremony that can be strictly observed in older households. As a part of these rules, the oldest woman in the round has to serve the other guests with tea, starting with the second oldest and then going down in age regardless of gender. The "kluntje" must be placed inside the teacup before the tea is poured right on top of it. After that some heavy cream is added carefully just as a top layer so it can make "clouds" (wulkjes) that swim on the tea itself. It's then forbidden to stir the tea, so the layers stay mild, strong and then sweet from top to bottom. Depending on the area of East Frisia, the tea can also be poured out of the cup into its saucer and drunk from there. If you don't want any more tea, you have to put your spoon into the cup or else the host will refill your cup immediately after everyone in the round finished their current cup of tea.

=== Religion ===
East Frisia is predominantly Protestant. In Rheiderland, Krummhörn and around Emden, the Reformed Church (Calvinism) is the dominant church, while in Leer, Norden and Aurich the Lutherans are the dominant church. However, the main church of the Reformed Christians is in Leer. It became Protestant through the help of Edzard I, Count of East Frisia, who supported the teachings of Martin Luther and the Reformation of 1517. It became a significant center for Calvinism. There are 266,000 Lutherans and about 80,000 Reformed – so about 346,000 of the approximately 465,000 citizens of East Frisia profess one of the two denominations. The Concordat of Emden in 1599 set rules for the cooperation of Lutherans and Calvinists in the county of East Frisia. Since then it is a special feature of the Protestant Landeskirchen in East Frisia, that Lutherans and Calvinists are members of each other's local church communities in places, where only one of both exists.

== Economy ==
East Frisia is a rural area. However, there are some industrial sites such as the Volkswagen car factory in Emden and the Enercon (windturbine) company in Aurich. Leer is, after Hamburg, the second most important location for shipping companies in Germany. Although just on the other side of the border to Emsland, the Meyer Werft is an important employer for East Frisians as well. Main industrial sites are the harbours of Emden and Leer, and Wilhelmshaven east of East Frisia.

Around 1900, many people left East Frisia due to lack of jobs and emigrated to the United States or elsewhere. Today the region is again suffering from the loss of young educated people, who go away to find better employment in, for example, southern Germany. Many communities face a rising number of aged people, creating structural problems in the future. There are few academic jobs in the area, and those are focused on engineering. The closest universities are the University of Oldenburg and Groningen. A Fachhochschule is located in Emden. The former nautical academy in Leer merged with Fachhochschule Emden in 2009.

== People ==
The people of East Frisia have close cultural ties to those of West Frisia, in the Netherlands, and of North Frisia, on the Jutland peninsula.

== See also ==
- Outline of Germany
- County of East Frisia
- East Frisians
- East Frisian jokes
- Frisia
- Frisian languages
- Frisian Islands
- Frisians
- Saterland
