= East Frisian Low Saxon =

West Low German dialect

- East Frisian Low German; East Frisian
- Oostfräisk, Oostfreesk, dat ostfräske Plattdüts
- Native to: Germany
- Region: East Frisia
- Native speakers: 200,000 (2015) mainly adults
- Language family: Indo-European: Germanic; West Germanic; North Sea Germanic; Low German; Low Saxon; Northern Low Saxon; Friso-Saxon; East Frisian Low Saxon

Language codes
- ISO 639-2: frs
- ISO 639-3: frs
- Glottolog: east2288

East Frisian Low Saxon, also known as East Frisian Low German or simply (but ambiguously) East Frisian, is a Northern Low Saxon dialect spoken in the East Frisian peninsula of northwestern Lower Saxony.

East Frisian Low Saxon is not to be confused with the East Frisian language; the latter, spoken by about 2,000 individuals in the municipality of Saterland, is a Frisian language, while East Frisian Low Saxon is a dialect of the Low German language.

East Frisian Low Saxon remains in everyday use among segments of the coastal population in East Frisia, particularly among older generations and in rural communities. Estimates suggest that approximately half of the regional population retains some level of active usage, though both fluent speakers and passive comprehension are in decline due to sociolinguistic shifts and increasing dominance of Standard German. There are several dialects in East Frisian Low Saxon, but there are two main groups of dialects. The dialects in the east, called Harlinger Platt, are strongly influenced by Northern Low Saxon of Oldenburg. The western dialects are closer to the Low Saxon Language spoken in the Dutch province of Groningen, Gronings.

East Frisian Low Saxon differs from other Northern Low Saxon dialects in several aspects, which are often linked to Frisian heritage. The language was originally spoken in East Frisia and Groningen was Frisian, so the current Low German dialects of East Frisia, as part of the dialects, build on a Frisian substrate which has led to a large amount of unique lexical, syntactic, and phonological items which differ from other Low Saxon variants. Some Old Frisian vocabulary is still in active speech today.

East Frisian Low Saxon features frequent use of diminutives, as in the Dutch language, e.g. Kluntje ‘lump of rock sugar’. In many cases, diminutives of names, especially female ones, have become names of their own. For example: Antje (from Anna), Triintje (from Trina = Katharina) etc.

The dialects spoken in East Frisia are closely related to those spoken in the Dutch province of Groningen (Grunnegs, Grünnigs) and in Northern Drenthe (Noordenvelds). The biggest difference seems to be that of loanwords (from Dutch or German, resp.).

Examples
East Frisian Low Saxon	Gronings	West Frisian	Northern Low Saxon	English
höör/hör [høːɚ]	heur [høːr]	har	ehr [eə]	her
mooj/mooi [moːɪ]	mooi [moːɪ]	moai	scheun [ʃœːin]	beautiful, nice, fine
was [vas]	was [vas]	wie	wer [vɛ.iə]	was
geböören/geböhren (imp.) [ɡebøːnː]	gebeurn [ɣəbøːnː]	barre	passeern [passe.rn]	to happen
prooten/proten [proːtnˑˈ]	proaten [proːtnˑˈ]	prate	snakken [snakɪn]	to talk

The standard greeting is Moin (moi in Gronings), used 24 hours a day.

== Phonology ==
=== Consonants ===
		Labial	Alveolar	Retroflex	Palatal	Velar	Uvular	Glottal
Nasal		m	n			ŋ		
Plosive	Voiceless	p	t			k		
Plosive	Voiced	b	d			ɡ		
Fricative	Voiceless	f	s		ç		χ	h
Fricative	Voiced	v	z		ʝ		ʁ	
Approximant	Median			ɻ		w		
Approximant	Lateral		l					

== Orthography ==
East Frisian Low Saxon has two orthographies which are well known. One is developed by the Ostfriesische Landschaft, which is based on the orthography by Johannes Sass. The Ostfriesische Landschaft uses this spelling for all of their projects, and to promote the dialect. It is considered to also be a cross di-dialect compromise writing, to provide materials in Low German for outside of the East Frisian Low Saxon dialect speaking area, and is recognized by the government of Lower Saxony.

However, a newer, more phonetic orthography was developed in 1975 by Holger Weigelt, since he expressed concerns that the grammatical structures and character of East Frisian Low Saxon would not be presented well under the Sass-based spelling. This orthography is used fully by the Jungfräiske Mäinskup, which promotes the dialect and provides learning materials in this spelling. They also recognize East Frisian Low Saxon as its own Friso-Saxon language. The Incubator Wikipedia for East Frisian Low Saxon along with the examples of the dialect in this page are also in this spelling.
