= Saterland Frisian language =

Dialect of East Frisian

Saterland Frisian
- Seeltersk
- Pronunciation: [ˈseːltɐsk]
- Native to: Germany
- Region: Saterland
- Ethnicity: Saterland Frisians
- Native speakers: 2,000 (2015)
- Language family: Indo-European: Germanic; West Germanic; North Sea Germanic; Anglo-Frisian; Frisian; East Frisian; Ems; Saterland Frisian
- Writing system: Latin

Official status
- Recognised minority language in: Germany
- Regulated by: Seelter Buund in Saterland/Seelterlound (unofficial)

Language codes
- ISO 639-3: stq
- Glottolog: emsf1235
- ELP: Saterfriesisch
- Linguasphere: 52-ACA-ca
- Present-day distribution of the Frisian languages in Europe: West Frisian North Frisian Saterland Frisian

- Saterland Frisian is classified as Definitely Endangered by the UNESCO Atlas of the World's Languages in Danger

Saterland Frisian, also known as Sater Frisian, Saterfrisian or Saterlandic (Seeltersk [ˈseːltɐsk]), spoken in the Saterland municipality of Lower Saxony in Germany, is the last living dialect of the East Frisian language. It is closely related to the other Frisian languages: North Frisian, spoken in Germany as well, and West Frisian, spoken in the Dutch province of Friesland.

== Classification ==
From a diachronical perspective, Saterland Frisian is an Emsfrisian dialect of the East Frisian language. Emsfrisian used to be spoken in the western half of the East Frisian peninsula and in the Ommelanden. The other East Frisian dialect group was the Weserfrisian, formerly spoken from the eastern half of the East Frisian peninsula to beyond the Weser.

Together with West Frisian and North Frisian it belongs to the Frisian branch of the Germanic languages. The three Frisian languages evolved from Old Frisian. Among the living Frisian dialects, the one spoken in Heligoland (called Halunder) is the closest to Saterland Frisian. The closest language other than Frisian dialects is English.

Frisian and English are often grouped together as Anglo-Frisian languages. Today, English, Frisian and Lower German, sometimes also Dutch, are grouped together under the label North Sea Germanic. Low German, which is closely related to Saterland Frisian, lacks many North Sea Germanic features already from the Old Saxon period onward. In turn, Saterland Frisian has had prolonged close contact with Low German.

== History ==
Settlers from East Frisia, who left their homelands around 1100 AD due to natural disasters, established the Frisian language in the Saterland. Since the sparse population at the time of their arrival spoke Old Saxon, the Frisian language of the settlers came into close contact with Low German.

In East Frisia, the assimilation of Frisian speakers into the Low German speaking population was well under way in the early 16th century. The dialect of the Saterland persisted mostly due to geography. As the Saterland is surrounded by bogland, its inhabitants had few contacts with adjacent regions. The villages built on sandy hills were basically like islands. Until the 19th century, the settlement area was almost exclusively reachable by boat via the river Sagter Ems (Seelter Äi), the exception being walking on frozen or dried out bogland during times of extreme weather.

Politically, the land did not belong to the County of East Frisia, which came into existence in the 15th century, but changed hands frequently until it became part of the County of Oldenburg. The resulting border was not merely political, but also denominational, as the Saterland was recatholicized. The Saterland was also linguistically and culturally different from Oldenburg. This led to further isolation.

Colonialization of the bogland, with construction of roads and railways, led to the Saterland being less isolated. Nevertheless, Saterfrisian survived, because most of the community living in the Saterland continued to use the language. This common linguistic area was disturbed following World War II. German repatriates from Eastern Europe were settled in the Saterland, leading to Standard German gradually replacing Saterfrisian. While the predicted language death in the late 20th century did not happen, and the number of speakers remained stable, the Saterfrisian speaking community nowadays make up only a minority of the Saterland population.

== Geographic distribution ==
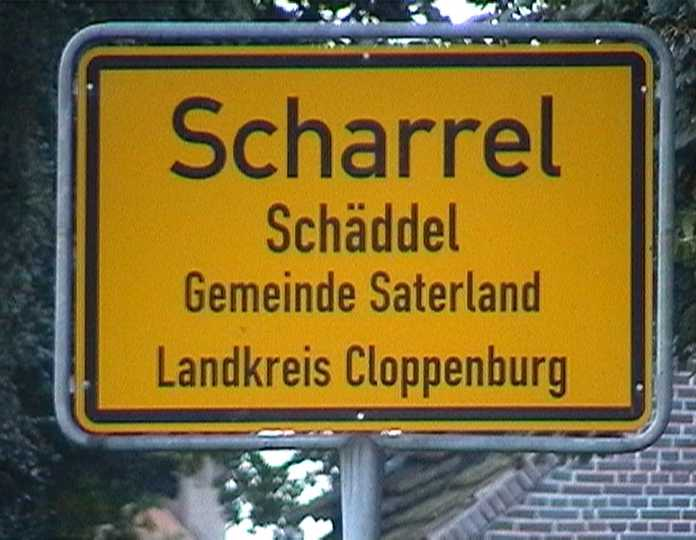
A bilingual sign, with the second line showing the place name in Saterland Frisian

Today, estimates of the number of speakers vary slightly. Saterland Frisian is spoken by about 2,250 people, out of a total population in Saterland of some 10,000; an estimated 2,000 people speak the language well, slightly fewer than half of those being native speakers. (Note: A number of 6,370 speakers is cited by Fort, a 1995 poll counted 2,225 speakers; Ethnologue refers to a monolingual population of 5,000, but this number originally was not of speakers but of persons who counted themselves ethnically Saterland Frisian.) The great majority of native speakers belong to the older generation; Saterland Frisian is thus a seriously endangered language. It might, however, no longer be moribund, as several reports suggest that the number of speakers is rising among the younger generation, some of whom raise their children in Saterlandic.

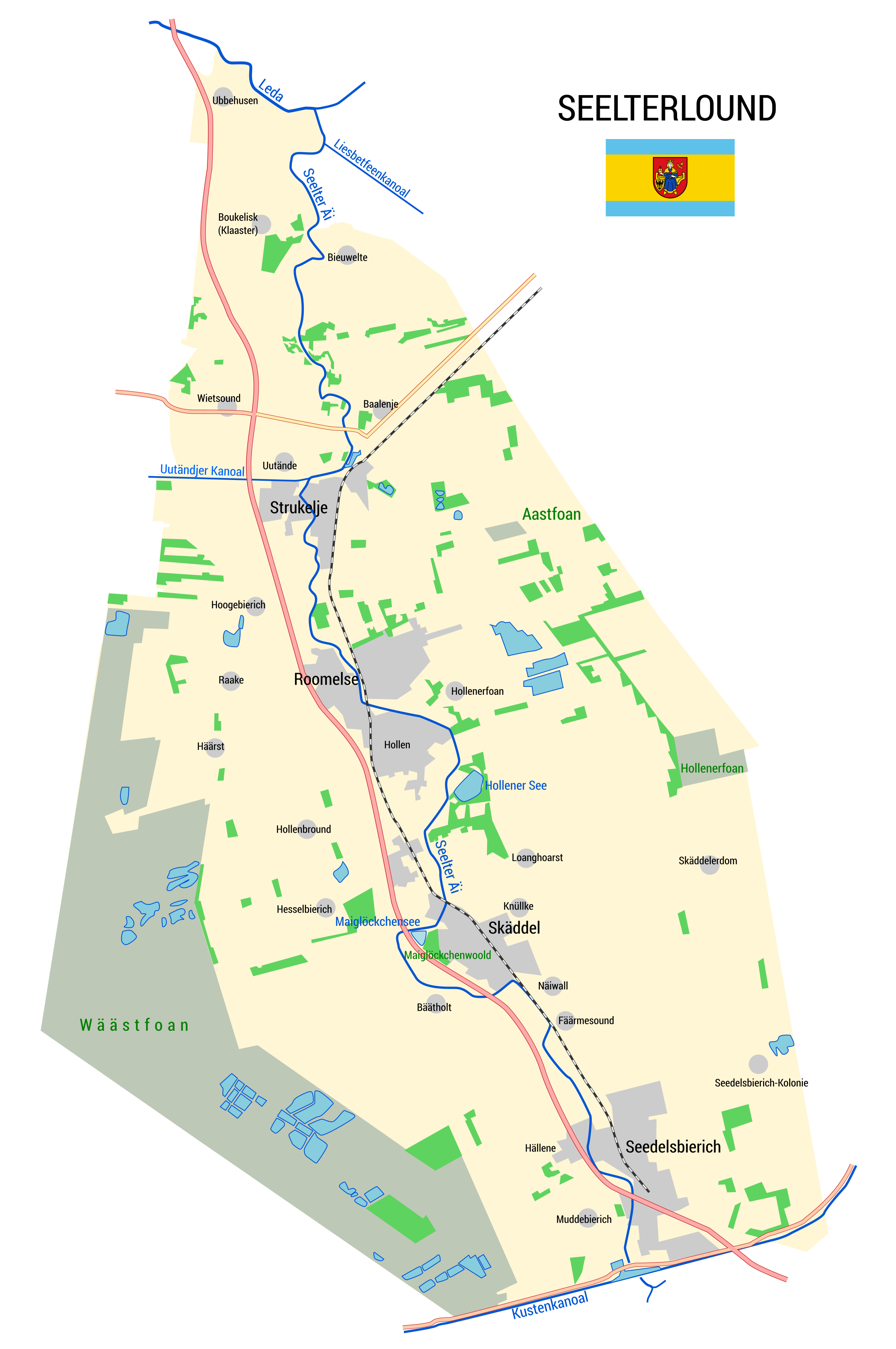
Map of Saterland with names in Sater Frisian

=== Current revitalization efforts ===
Since about 1800, Sater Frisian has attracted the interest of a growing number of linguists. Media coverage sometimes argues that this linguistic interest, particularly the work of Marron Curtis Fort, helped preserve the language and revive interest among speakers in transmitting it to the next generation. During the last century, a small literature developed in it. Also, the New Testament of the Bible was translated into Sater Frisian by Fort, who was himself a Christian.

Children's books in Saterlandic are few, compared to those in German. Margaretha (Gretchen) Grosser, a retired member of the community of Saterland, has translated many children's books from German into Saterlandic. A full list of the books and the time of their publication can be seen on the German Wikipedia page of Margaretha Grosser.

Recent efforts to revitalize Saterlandic include the creation of an app called "Kleine Saterfriesen" (Little Sater Frisians) on Google Play. According to the app's description, it aims at making the language fun for children to learn, as it teaches them Saterlandic vocabulary in many different domains (the supermarket, the farm, the church). There have been more than 500 downloads of the app since its release in December 2016, according to statistics on Google Play Store.

The language remains capable of producing neologisms as evidenced by a competition during the COVID-19 pandemic to create a Saterfrisian word for anti-Covid face masks held in late 2020 / early 2021 which resulted in the term "Sküüldouk" being adopted with face masks having the Saterfrisian sentence "Bäte dusse Sküüldouk wädt Seeltersk boald!" ("Under this face mask, Saterfrisian is spoken") written on them gaining some local popularity.

=== Official status ===
The German government has not committed significant resources to the preservation of Sater Frisian. Most of the work to secure the endurance of this language is therefore done by the Seelter Buund ("Saterlandic Alliance"). Along with North Frisian and five other languages, Sater Frisian was included in Part III of the European Charter for Regional or Minority Languages by Germany in 1998.

=== Dialects ===
There are three fully mutually intelligible dialects, corresponding to the three main villages of the municipality of Saterland: Ramsloh (Saterlandic: Roomelse), Scharrel (Schäddel), and Strücklingen (Strukelje). The Ramsloh dialect now somewhat enjoys a status as a standard language, since a grammar and a word list were based on it.

== Phonology ==
The phonology of Saterland Frisian is regarded as very conservative linguistically, as the entire East Frisian language group was conservative with regards to Old Frisian. The following tables are based on studies by Marron C. Fort.

=== Vowels ===
Chart of Saterland Frisian monophthongs, from

Chart of Saterland Frisian diphthongs, from

==== Monophthongs ====
The consonant /r/ is often realised as a vowel [ɐ̯ ~ ɐ] in the syllable coda depending on its syllable structure.

Short vowels:

Grapheme	Phoneme	Example
a	/a/	fat (fat)
ä	/ɛ/	Sät (a while)
e	/ə/	ze (they)
i	/ɪ/	Lid (limb)
o	/ɔ/	Dot (toddler)
ö	/œ/	bölkje (to shout)
u	/ʊ/	Buk (book)
ü	/ʏ/	Djüpte (depth)

Semi-long vowels:

Grapheme	Phoneme	Example
ie	/iˑ/	Piene (pain)
uu	/uˑ/	kuut (short)

Long vowels:

Grapheme	Phoneme	Example
aa	/aː/	Paad (path)
ää	/ɛː/	tään (thin)
ee	/eː/	Dee (dough)
íe	/iː/	Wíek (week)
oa	/ɔː/	doalje (to calm)
oo	/oː/	Roop (rope)
öö	/øː/	röögje (rain)
öä	/œː/	Göäte (gutter)
üü	/yː/	Düwel (devil)
úu	/uː/	Múus (mouse)

==== Diphthongs ====
Grapheme	Phoneme	Example
ai	/aːi/	Bail (bail)
au	/aːu/	Dau (dew)
ääu	/ɛːu/	sääuwen (self)
äi	/ɛɪ/	wäit (wet)
äu	/ɛu/	häuw (hit, thrust)
eeu	/eːu/	skeeuw (skew)
ieu	/iˑu/	Grieuw (advantage)
íeu	/iːu/	íeuwen (even, plain)
iu	/ɪu/	Kiuwe (chin)
oai	/ɔːɪ/	toai (tough)
oi	/ɔy/	floitje (to pipe)
ooi	/oːɪ/	swooije (to swing)
ou	/oːu/	Bloud (blood)
öi	/œːi/	Böije (gust of wind)
uui	/uːɪ/	truuije (to threaten)
üüi	/yːi/	Sküüi (gravy)

=== Consonants ===
		Labial	Alveolar	Dorsal	Glottal
Stop	voiceless	p	t	k	
Stop	voiced	b	d	ɡ	
Fricative	voiceless	f	s	x	h
Fricative	voiced	v	z	ɣ	
Nasal		m	n	ŋ	
Trill			r		
Approximant		(w)	l	j	

Today, voiced plosives in the syllable coda are usually terminally devoiced. Older speakers and a few others may use voiced codas.

== Orthography ==
Saterland Frisian became a written language relatively recently. German orthography cannot adequately represent the vowel-rich Frisian language. Until the mid-20th century, scholars researching it developed their own orthography. The poet Gesina Lechte-Siemer, who published poems in Saterfrisian since the 1930s, adopted a proposal by the cultural historian Julius Bröring.

In the 1950s Jelle Brouwer, professor in Groningen, an orthography based on the Dutch one, which failed to gain widespread acceptance. The West Frisian Pyt Kramer, who did research in Saterfrisian, developed a phonemic orthography. The American linguist Marron Curtis Fort used Brouwer's Dutch-based orthography as a basis for his own proposal. The most notable difference between the two orthographies is the way long vowels are represented. Kramer proposes that long vowels always be spelled with a double vowels (baale 'to speak'), while Fort maintains, that long vowels in open syllables be spelled with a single vowels, as Frisian vowels in open syllables are always long (bale 'to speak'). Both proposals use almost no diacritics, apart from Fort's use of acutes to differentiate long vowels from semi-long ones.

So far, no standard has evolved. Those projects tutored by Kramer use his orthography while Fort published his works in his orthography, which is also recognized by the German authorities. Others use a compromise. This lack of standards leads to the village Scharrel being spelled Schäddel on its town sign instead of the currently used Skäddel.

=== Plosives ===
Grapheme	Phoneme	Example	Notes
p	/p/	Pik (pitch)	
t	/t/	Toom (bridle)	
k	/k/	koold (cold)	
b	/b/	Babe (father)	Occasionally voiced in syllable coda
d	/d/	Dai (day)	May be voiced in syllable coda by older speakers
g	/ɡ/	Gäize (goose)	A realization especially used by younger speakers instead of [ɣ].

=== Fricatives ===
Grapheme	Phoneme(s)	Example	Notes
g	/ɣ/,/x/	Gäize (goose), Ploug (plough)	Voiced velar fricative, unvoiced in the syllable coda and before an unvoiced consonant. Younger speakers show a tendency towards using the plosive [ɡ] instead of [ɣ], as in German, but that development has not yet been reported in most scientific studies.
f	/f/,/v/	Fjúur (fire)	Realised voicedly by a suffix: ljoof - ljowe (dear - love)
w	/v/	Woater (water)	Normally a voiced labio-dental fricative like in German, after u it is however realised as bilabial semi-vowel [w] (see below).
v	/v/,/f/	iek skräive (I scream)	Realised voicelessly before voiceless consonants: du skräifst (you scream)
s	/s/,/z/	säike (to seek), zuuzje (to sough)	Voiced [z] in the syllable onset is unusual for Frisian dialects and also rare in Saterlandic. There is no known minimal pair s - z so /z/ is probably not a phoneme. Younger speakers tend to use [ʃ] more, for the combination of /s/ + another consonant: in fräisk (Frisian) not [frɛɪsk] but [fʀɛɪʃk]. That development, however, has not yet been reported in most scientific studies.
ch	/x/	truch (through)	Only in syllable nucleus and coda.
h	/h/	hoopje (to hope)	Only in onset.

=== Other consonants ===
Grapheme	Phoneme	Example	Notes
m	/m/	Moud (courage)	
n	/n/	näi (new)	
ng	/ŋ/	sjunge (to sing)	
j	/j/	Jader (udder)	
l	/l/	Lound (land)	
r	/r/, [r], [ʀ], [ɐ̯], [ɐ]	Roage (rye)	Traditionally, a rolled or simple alveolar [r] in onsets and between vowels. After vowels or in codas, it becomes [ɐ]. Younger speakers tend to use a uvular [ʀ] instead. That development, however, has not yet been reported in most scientific studies.
w	/v/, [w]	Kiuwe (chin)	As in English, it is realised as a bilabial semivowel only after u.

== Morphology ==
=== Personal pronouns ===
The subject pronouns of Saterland Frisian are as follows:

		singular	plural
first person		iek	wie
second person		du	jie
third person	masculine	hie, er	jo, ze (unstr.)
third person	feminine	ju, ze (unstr.)	jo, ze (unstr.)
third person	neuter	dät, et, t	jo, ze (unstr.)

=== Numbers ===
Numbers one through three in Saterland Frisian vary in form based on the gender of the noun they occur with. In the table, "m." stands for masculine, "f." for feminine, and "n." for neuter.

For the purposes of comparison, here is a table with numbers 1–10 in Saterland Frisian and 6 other West Germanic languages, including 3 stages of English:

Saterland Frisian	Old English (pre-1066)	West Frisian	North Frisian	Low German	Dutch	German	Middle English (Chaucer's time, c. 1400)	Modern English
aan (m.) een (f., n.)	ān	ien	ian	een	een	eins	oon / on	one
twäin (m.) two (f., n.)	twēġen (m.) tū (f., n.)	twa	tou	twee	twee	zwei	two / tweyne	two
träi (m.) trjo (f., n.)	þrīe	trije	trii	dree	drie	drei	three / thre	three
fjauer	fēower	fjouwer	fjouer	veer	vier	vier	four / foure	four
fieuw	fīf	fiif	fåif	fief	vijf	fünf	five / fyve	five
säks	siex	seis	soks	söss	zes	sechs	six / sixe	six
sogen	seofon	sân	söwen	söben	zeven	sieben	seven / sevene	seven
oachte	eahta	acht	oocht	acht	acht	acht	eighte / eyghte	eight
njúgen	nigon	njoggen	naiden	negen	negen	neun	nyne	nine
tjoon	tīen	tsien	tiin	teihn	tien	zehn	ten / tenne	ten

== Vocabulary ==
The Saterlfrisian language preserved some lexical peculiarities of East Frisian, such as the verb reke replacing the equivalent of German: geben in all contexts (e.g. Daach rakt et Ljude, doo deer baale …, German: Doch gibt es Leute, die da sprechen; 'Yet there are people, who speak') or kwede ('to say') compare English 'quoth'. In Old Frisian, quetha and sedza existed (Augustinus seith ande queth …, 'Augustinus said and said'). Another word, common in earlier forms of Western Germanic, but survived only in East Frisian is Soaks meaning 'knife' (comp. Seax).

== In the media ==
Nordwest-Zeitung, a German-language regional daily newspaper based in Oldenburg, Germany, publishes occasional articles in Saterland Frisian. The articles are also made available on the newspaper's Internet page, under the headline Seeltersk.

As of 2004, the regional radio station Ems-Vechte-Welle broadcasts a 2-hour program in Saterland Frisian and Low German entitled Middeeges. The program is aired every other Sunday from 11:00 a.m. to 1:00 p.m. The first hour of the program is usually reserved for Saterland Frisian. The program usually consists of interviews about local issues between music. The station can be streamed live though the station's Internet page.

== Sample text ==
Below is a snippet of the New Testament in Saterland Frisian, published in 2000 and translated by Marron Curtis Fort:

Dut aal is geskäin, dät dät uutkume skuul, wät die Here truch dän Profeet kweden häd;

Translation:

This all has happened, so that it would come true, what the Lord through the prophet has said;

The Lord's Prayer:

Uus Foar in dän Hemel, din Nome wäide heliged,
läit dien Riek boalde kume, läit din Wille geskjo so in dän Hemel as ap ju Äide.
Dou uus dälig dät Brood, dät wie bruke.
Un ferreke uus uus Skeelden, so as wie ze uus Skeeldlju-dene ferroat häbe.
Un lede uus nit in
Fersäikenge, man rädde uus fóar dät Kwode. Dan dienen is dät Riek un ju Krääft un ju Heerdelkaid bit in alle Eeuwigaid.
Amen.

Translation:

A preview of the first stanza of the Saterlied (Seelter Läid), which is considered to be the regional anthem of Saterland:

Ljude rakt et fuul un Lounde,
Do ap Goddes Wareld stounde.
Man wät gungt deer wäil uur Seelter,
Un uur’t litje Seelterlound?

Translation:

There are many people and countries
who stand on God's earth,
But what goes well over Sater,
About the small Saterland?

== See also ==
- Frisia
- Frisian Islands
- Frisian languages
- Frisians
- Saterland Frisians
