= Wiedingharde Frisian =

Dialect of the North Frisian language

- Wiringhiirder freesk
- Native to: Germany
- Region: Wiedingharde
- Language family: Indo-European: Germanic; West Germanic; Ingvaeonic; Anglo-Frisian; Frisian; North Frisian; Mainland; Wiedingharde Frisian

Language codes
- ISO 639-3: –
- Glottolog: wied1234
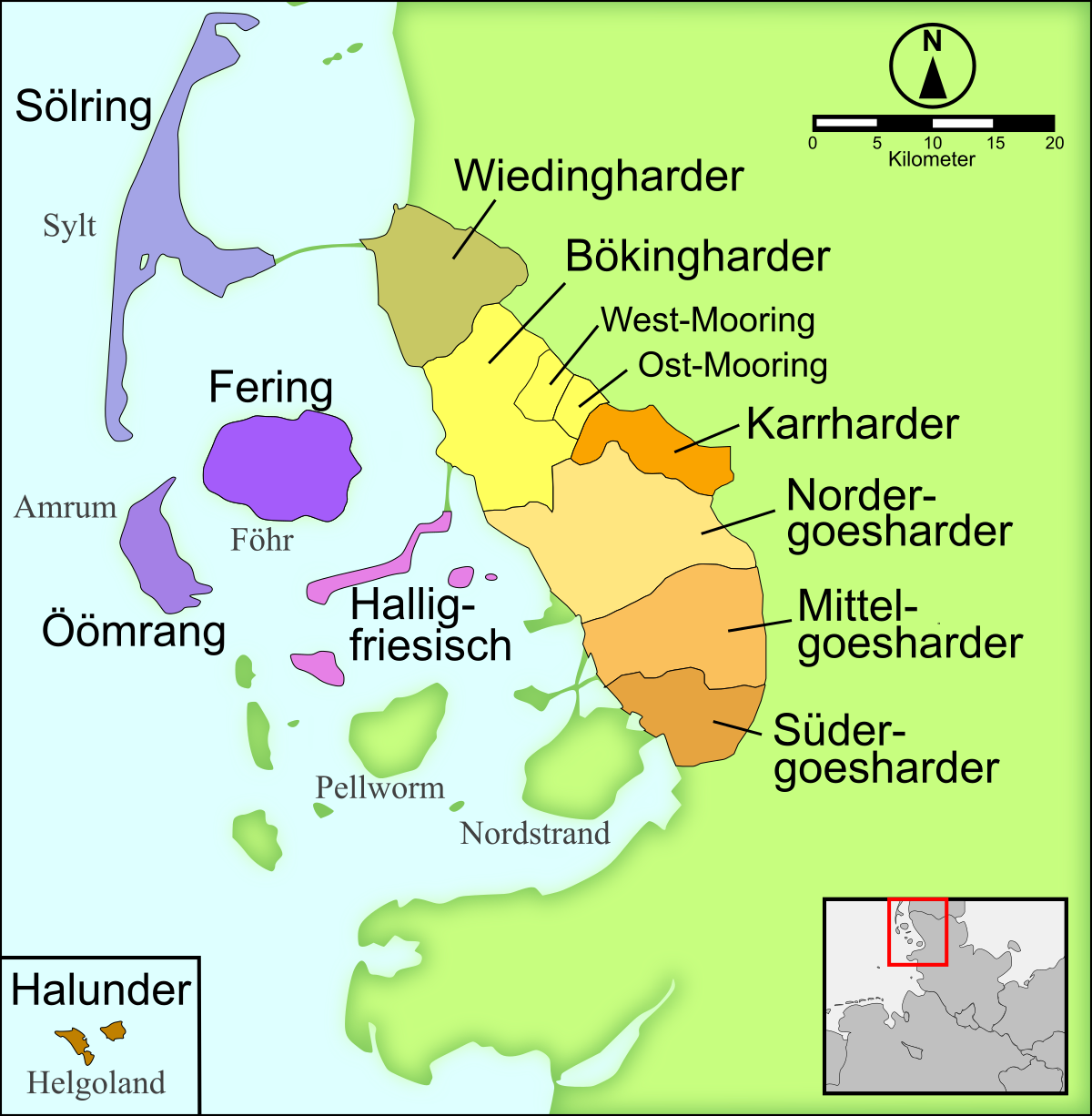
- North Frisian dialects

Wiedingharde Frisian (North Frisian: Wiringhiirder freesk, Danish: Vidingherredfrisisk) is a dialect of the North Frisian language spoken in the German amt of Wiedingharde south of the border to Denmark in North Frisia (historic south of the river Widau). The dialect forms part of the mainland group of North Frisian dialects. Although it is spoken adjacent to Mooring-speaking Bökingharde, it has more in common with Goesharde Frisian. Like the insular Söl'ring dialect, Wiedingharde Frisian shows influence from Danish and South Jutlandic.
