= Halligen Frisian =

Mainland North Frisian dialect

Hallingen Frisian
- Halifreesk
- Native to: Germany
- Region: Halligen islands
- Native speakers: 40 (1972)
- Language family: Indo-European: Germanic; West Germanic; Ingvaeonic; Anglo-Frisian; Frisian; North Frisian; Mainland; Strand Frisian; Hallingen Frisian
- Early form: Strand Frisian

Language codes
- ISO 639-3: –
- Glottolog: hall1241
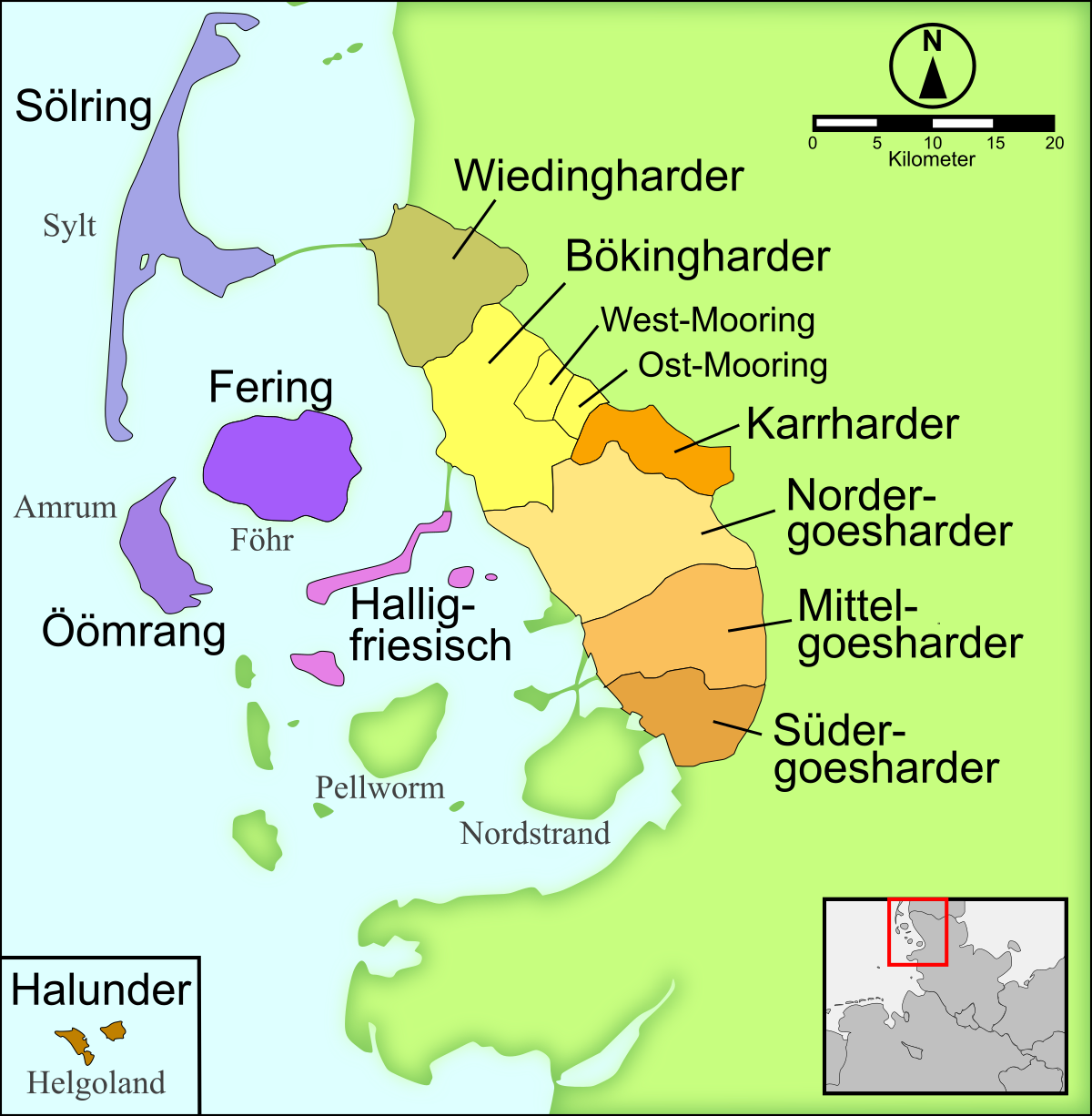
- North Frisian dialects

Halligen Frisian (North Frisian: Halifreesk) is the dialect of the North Frisian language spoken on the Halligen islands, primarily Langeneß and Hooge, in the German region of North Frisia. The dialect has survived despite the islands being home to less than 300 people and unprotected by dikes, mandating evacuations during storms. However, it is now in danger of extinction. Although it is spoken on islands, it is considered part of the Mainland North Frisian dialects as opposed to the Insular North Frisian Dialects, due to its linguistic features.

== Grammar ==
=== Verbs ===
Below are six commonly used verbs in Halligen Frisian:

| | Be | Have | Become | Want | Shall | Can |
|---|---|---|---|---|---|---|
| infinitive | weese | heewe | warde | wal | skal or schal | kun |
| past participle | wään | heet | wuden | weelt | sköölt or schöölt | kut |
| person | present | | | | | |
| 1sg | bän | hääw | ward | wal | skal or schal | koon |
| 2sg | bäst | hääst | warst | wääl or wäät | skääl or schäät | koonst |
| 3sg | is | heet | ward | wal | skal or schal | koon |
| plural | sän | heewe | warde | win | skin or schin | kun |
| person | past | | | | | |
| 1 & 3sg | waos | hee | wud | weel | skööl or schööl | ku |
| 2sg | weerst | heest | wudst | weest | skööst or schööst | kust |
| pl | weern | heen | wuden | ween | sköön or schöön | kun |

- The future tense is formed with the verbs wal or skal.
- The perfect tense is formed with either hääw or weese.
