= Anglo-Frisian languages =

Group of West Germanic languages

Anglo-Frisian
- Geographic distribution: Originally England, Scottish Lowlands and the North Sea coast from Friesland to Jutland; today worldwide
- Linguistic classification: Indo-European: Germanic; West Germanic; North Sea Germanic; Anglo-Frisian
- Subdivisions: Anglic; Frisian

Language codes
- Glottolog: angl1264
- Approximate present day distribution of the Anglo-Frisian languages in Europe. Anglic: English Scots Frisian: West Frisian North Frisian Saterland Frisian Hatched areas indicate where multilingualism is common.

The Anglo-Frisian languages are a proposed sub-branch of the West Germanic languages encompassing the Anglic languages (English, Scots, extinct Fingallian, and extinct Yola) as well as the Frisian languages (North Frisian, East Frisian, and West Frisian). While this relationship had considerable support historically, many modern scholars have criticized it as a valid phylogenetic grouping. Instead, they believe that the Ingvaeonic languages comprised a dialect continuum which stretched along the North Sea, finally diverging into distinct languages – Old English, Pre–Old Frisian, and Old Saxon – during the Migration Period in the 5th century. There are still proponents of an Anglo-Frisian node in the West Germanic tree, citing strong archeological and genetic evidence for the comingling of these groups. In the 1950s, Hans Kuhn argued that the two languages diverged at the Ingvaeonic level, but later "converged". He argued that this convergence explained the striking similarity of the two languages while also explaining the issues in chronology. This view has been dismissed as improbable given the geographic divide.

The Anglo-Frisian languages are usually considered part of the North Sea Germanic languages, a group which also includes Low German in most definitions. The Anglo-Frisian languages have been distinguished from other West Germanic languages due to several sound changes: besides the Ingvaeonic nasal spirant law, which is present in Low German as well, Anglo-Frisian brightening and palatalization of /k/ are for the most part unique to the modern Anglo-Frisian languages:

- English cheese, Scots cheese and West Frisian tsiis, but Dutch kaas, Low German Kees, and German Käse
- English church, and West Frisian tsjerke, but Dutch kerk, Low German Kerk, Kark, and German Kirche
- English sheep, Scots sheep and West Frisian skiep, but Dutch schaap (pl. schapen), Low German Schaap, German Schaf (pl. Schafe)

The grouping is usually implied as a separate branch in regards to the tree model. According to this reading, English and Frisian would have had a proximal ancestral form in common that no other attested group shares. The early Anglo-Frisian varieties, like Old English and Old Frisian, and the third Ingvaeonic group at the time, the ancestor of Low German Old Saxon, were spoken by intercommunicating populations. While this has been cited as a reason for a few traits exclusively shared by Old Saxon and either Old English or Old Frisian, a genetic unity of the Anglo-Frisian languages beyond that of an Ingvaeonic subfamily cannot be considered a majority opinion. In fact, the groupings of Ingvaeonic and West Germanic languages are highly debated, even though they rely on much more innovations and evidence. Some scholars consider a Proto-Anglo-Frisian language as disproven, as far as such postulates are falsifiable. Nevertheless, the close ties and strong similarities between the Anglic and the Frisian grouping are part of the scientific consensus. Therefore, the concept of Anglo-Frisian languages can be useful and is today employed without these implications.

Geography isolated the settlers of Great Britain from Continental Europe, except from contact with communities capable of open water navigation. This resulted in more Old Norse and Norman language influences during the development of Late Modern English, whereas the modern Frisian languages developed under contact with the southern Germanic populations, restricted to the continent.

== Classification ==
The proposed Anglo-Frisian family tree is:

- Anglo-Frisian
  - Anglic
    - South Anglic
      - Central English
        - West Central English
        - East Central English
      - Southern English
    - North Anglic
      - Scots
        - Insular Scots
        - Northern Scots
        - Central Scots
        - Southern Scots
        - Doric Scots
        - Ulster Scots
      - Northern English
        - Northumbrian English
        - Lower Northern English
    - Irish Anglo-Norman
      - Fingalian (extinct)
      - Yola (extinct)
  - Frisian
    - West Frisian
      - Hindeloopen Frisian
      - Schiermonnikoog Frisian
      - Westlauwers–Terschellings
        - Terschelling Frisian
        - West Lauwers Frisian
          - Wood Frisian
            - Westereendersk
          - Clay Frisian
          - South Frisian
      - Westereendersk
    - East Frisian
      - Ems Frisian
        - Saterland Frisian
      - Weser Frisian †
        - Wangerooge Frisian †
        - Wursten Frisian †
    - North Frisian
      - Mainland North Frisian
        - Bökingharde Frisian
          - West Mooring
          - East Mooring
        - Goesharde Frisian
        - Karrharde Frisian
        - Strand Frisian†
          - Halligen Frisian
        - Wiedingharde Frisian
      - Insular North Frisian
        - Eiderstedt Frisian †
        - Sylt North Frisian
        - Föhr–Amrum
          - Amrum North Frisian
          - Föhr North Frisian
        - Heligoland Frisian
    - Old South Frisian †

=== Anglic languages ===
Anglic, Insular Germanic, or English languages and dialects encompass Old English and all the linguistic varieties descended from it. These include Middle English, Early Modern English, and Late Modern English; Early Scots, Middle Scots, and Modern Scots; and the extinct Fingallian and Yola languages in Ireland.

English-based creole languages are not generally included, as mainly only their lexicon and not necessarily their grammar, phonology, etc. comes from Early Modern English and Late Modern English.

=== Frisian languages ===
The Frisian languages are a group of languages spoken by about 500,000 Frisian people on the southern fringes of the North Sea in the Netherlands and Germany. West Frisian, by far the most spoken of the three main branches with 875,840 total speakers, constitutes an official language in the Dutch province of Friesland. North Frisian is spoken on some North Frisian Islands and parts of mainland North Frisia in the northernmost German district of Nordfriesland, and also in Heligoland in the German Bight, both part of Schleswig-Holstein state (Heligoland is part of its mainland district of Pinneberg). North Frisian has approximately 8,000 speakers. The East Frisian language is spoken by only about 2,000 people; speakers are located in Saterland in Germany.
Until the 20th century, multiple dialects of East Frisian were spoken, but today only the Saterland Frisian variety of the Ems dialect survives. In contrast, West Frisian comprises three main dialects, while North Frisian includes ten distinct varieties.

- West Frisian dialects:
  - Clay Frisian (Klaaifrysk)
  - South or Southwest Frisian (Súdhoeksk)
  - Wood Frisian (Wâldfrysk)
- North Frisian dialects:
  - Insular dialects
    - Sylt Frisian (Söl'ring)
    - Föhr-Amrum Frisian (Fering, Öömrang)
    - Heligolandic Frisian (Halunder)
  - Mainland dialects
    - Wiedingharde Frisian (Wiringhiirder)
    - Bökingharde Frisian (Mooringer)
    - Karrharde Frisian (Karrharder)
    - Goesharde Frisian (Gooshiirder)
      - Northern Goesharde Frisian (incl. Hooringer Fräisch & Hoolmer Freesch)
      - Central Goesharde Frisian
      - Southern Goesharde Frisian (extinct since early 1980s)
    - Halligen Frisian (Halifreesk)

== Anglo-Frisian developments ==
The following is a summary of the major sound changes affecting vowels in chronological order. For additional detail, see Phonological history of Old English. That these were simultaneous and in that order for all Anglo-Frisian languages is considered disproved by some scholars.

1. Backing and nasalization of West Germanic a and ā before a nasal consonant
2. Loss of n before a spirant, resulting in lengthening and nasalization of preceding vowel
3. Single form for present and preterite plurals
4. A-fronting: West Germanic a, ā > æ, ǣ, even in the diphthongs ai and au (see Anglo-Frisian brightening)
5. palatalization of Proto-Germanic *k and *g before front vowels (but not phonemicization of palatals)
6. A-restoration: æ, ǣ > a, ā under the influence of neighboring consonants
7. Second fronting: OE dialects (except West Saxon) and Frisian ǣ > ē
8. A-restoration: a restored before a back vowel in the following syllable (later in the Southumbrian dialects); Frisian æu > au > Old Frisian ā/a
9. OE breaking; in West Saxon palatal diphthongization follows
10. i-mutation followed by syncope; Old Frisian breaking follows
11. Phonemicization of palatals and assibilation, followed by second fronting in parts of West Mercia
12. Smoothing and back mutation

== Comparisons ==
=== Numbers in Anglo-Frisian languages ===
These are the words for the numbers one to 12 in the Anglo-Frisian languages, with Dutch, Afrikaans, West-Flemish, and German included for comparison:

| Language | 1 | 2 | 3 | 4 | 5 | 6 | 7 | 8 | 9 | 10 | 11 | 12 |
|---|---|---|---|---|---|---|---|---|---|---|---|---|
| English | one | two | three | four | five | six | seven | eight | nine | ten | eleven | twelve |
| West Riding Yorkshire | one | two | three | fower | five | six | seven | eight | nine | ten | (e)leven | twelve |
| Scots (Note: Depending on dialect 1. [en], [jɪn], [in], [wan], [*eː], [jeː] 2. [twɑː], [twɔː], [tweː], [twaː] 3. [θrəi], [θriː], [triː] 4. [ˈfʌu(ə)r], [fuwr] 5. [faiːv], [fɛv] 6. [saks] 7. [ˈsiːvən], [ˈseːvən], [ˈsəivən] 8. [ext], [ɛçt] 9. [nəin], [nin] 10. [tɛn].) | ane ae* een yin | twa | three | fower | five | sax | seiven | aicht | nine | ten | eleiven | twal |
| Yola | oan | twye | dhree | vour | veeve | zeese | zeven | ayght | neen | dhen | ellven | twalve |
| West Frisian | ien | twa | trije | fjouwer | fiif | seis | sân | acht | njoggen | tsien | alve | tolve |
| Saterland Frisian | aan (m.) een (f., n.) | twäin (m.) two (f., n.) | träi (m.) trjo (f., n.) | fjauer | fieuw | säks | sogen | oachte | njúgen | tjoon | alven | twelig |
| North Frisian (Mooring dialect) | iinj ån | tou tuu | trii tra | fjouer | fiiw | seeks | soowen | oocht | nüügen | tiin | alwen | tweelwen |
| Dutch | een | twee | drie | vier | vijf | zes | zeven | acht | negen | tien | elf | twaalf |
| West-Flemish | jin | twi | drieje | viere | vuvve | zesse | zeevne | achte | neegn | tiene | elve | twolve |
| Afrikaans | een | twee | drie | vier | vyf | ses | sewe | agt | nege | tien | elf | twaalf |
| High German | eins | zwei | drei | vier | fünf | sechs | sieben | acht | neun | zehn | elf | zwölf |

* Ae [eː], [jeː] is an adjectival form used before nouns.

=== Vocabulary comparison ===
| English | West Riding Yorkshire | Scots | Yola | West Frisian | Afrikaans | Dutch | German | West-Flemish |
|---|---|---|---|---|---|---|---|---|
| day | day | day | dei | dei | dag | dag | Tag | dah |
| world | warld | warld | eord | wrâld | wêreld | wereld | Welt | wèreld |
| rain | rain | rain | rhyne | rein | reën | regen | Regen | rinne |
| blood | blooid | bluid | blooed | bloed | bloed | bloed | Blut | bloed |
| alone | aloan | alane | alane | allinne | alleen | alleen | allein | oaljinne |
| stone | stoan | stane | sthoan | stien | steen | steen | Stein | stjin |
| snow | snaw | snaw | sneow | snie | sneeu | sneeuw | Schnee | snji(w) |
| summer | summer | simmer | zimmer | simmer | somer | zomer | Sommer | zomer |
| way | way | wey | wye | wei | weg | weg | Weg | weh |
| almighty | almeety | awmichtie | aulmichty | almachtich | almagtig | almachtig | allmächtig | oalmahtih |
| ship | ship | ship | zhip | skip | skip | schip | Schiff | skip/sjgip |
| nail | nail | nail | niel | neil | nael | nagel | Nagel | noagle |
| old | owd | auld | yola | âld | oud | oud | alt | oed |
| butter | butter | butter | buther | bûter | botter | boter | Butter | beuter |
| cheese | cheese | cheese | cheese | tsiis | kaas | kaas | Käse | koas |
| apple | apple | aiple | appel | apel | appel | appel | Apfel | apple |
| church | church (older kurk) | kirk | chourche | tsjerke | kerk | kerk | Kirche | kerke |
| son | son | son | zon | soan | seun | zoon | Sohn | zeune |
| door | door | door | dher | doar | deur | deur | Tür | deure |
| good | gooid | guid | gooude | goed | goed | goed | gut | hoed |
| fork | fork | fork | vork | foarke | vurk | vork | Gabel; Forke (dated) | vork |
| sib | sib (obsolete) | sib | meany / sibbe (dated) | sibbe | sibbe | sibbe (dated) | Sippe | |
| together | together | thegither | agyther | tegearre | saam/tesame | samen tegader | zusammen | tegoare |
| morn(ing) | morn(in) | morn(in) | arich | moarn | môre | morgen | Morgen | morhn |
| until, till | whol, until, till | until, till | del | oant | tot | tot | bis | tot |
| where | wheer | whaur^{or whare} | fidie | wêr | waar | waar | wo | woa(r)(e) |
| key | key | key (Note: Depending on dialect [kiː] or [kəi].) | kei / kie | kaai | sleutel | sleutel | Schlüssel | sleutle |
| have been (was) | wor | wis | was | ha west | was gewees | ben geweest | bin gewesen | zy(n)/è gewist |
| two sheep | two sheep | twa sheep | twye zheep | twa skiep | twee skape | twee schapen | zwei Schafe | twi skoapn |
| have | have/hev/ha | hae | ha | hawwe | het | hebben | haben | èn |
| us | uz | us | ouse | ús | ons | ons | uns | oes |
| horse | hoss | horse | caule | hynder hoars (rare) | perd | paard ros (dated) | Pferd; Ross (dated) | pèrd |
| bread | breead | breid | breed | brea | brood | brood | Brot | brwot |
| hair | hair | hair | haar | hier | haar/hare | haar | Haar | oar |
| heart | heart | hert | hearth | hert | hart | hart | Herz | èrte |
| beard | beard | beard | bearde | burd | baard | baard | Bart | board |
| moon | mooin | muin | mond | moanne | maan | maan | Mond | moane |
| mouth | maath, gob | mooth | meouth | mûn | mond | mond | Mund | moend |
| ear | ear, lug | ear, lug (colloquial) | lug | ear | oor | oor | Ohr | wore/ôre |
| green | green | green | green | grien | groen | groen | grün | groene |
| red | red | reid | reed | read | rooi | rood | rot | rwod/rôd |
| sweet | sweet | sweet | sweet | swiet | soet | zoet | süß | zoet |
| through | throo/thro | throu (Note: Depending on dialect [θruː] or [θrʌu].) | draugh | troch | deur | door | durch | deur |
| wet | weet | weet | weate | wiet | nat | nat | nass | nat |
| eye | ee | ee | ei / iee | each | oog | oog | Auge | wooge/ôoge |
| dream | dreeam | dream | dreem | dream | droom | droom | Traum | droom |
| mouse | maase | moose | meouse | mûs | muis | muis | Maus | muzze |
| house | haase | hoose | heouse | hûs | huis | huis | Haus | hus |
| it goes on | it goes/goas on | it gaes/gangs on | it goath an | it giet oan | dit gaan aan | het gaat door | es geht weiter/los | tgoa deure |
| good day | gooid day | guid day | gooude dei | goeie (dei) | goeie dag | goedendag | guten Tag | goein dah |

== See also ==
- High German languages
- Low Franconian languages
- English-based creole languages
- Angloromani language
- Bungi dialect
- Hokaglish
- Scottish Cant
- Shelta
- Stadsfries Dutch

== Sources ==
- Bazelmans, Jos (2009). "The Early-Medieval Use of Ethnic Names from Classical Antiquity: the Case of the Frisians". In Derks, Ton; Roymans, Nico (eds.). Ethnic Constructs in Antiquity: The Role of Power and Tradition. Amsterdam Archaeological Studies. Vol. 13. Amsterdam University Press. pp. 321–338. ISBN 978-90-485-0791-7. JSTOR j.ctt46n1n2.1.
- Bremmer, Rolf H. (2009). An Introduction to Old Frisian: History, Grammar, Reader, Glossary. Amsterdam: John Benjamins. ISBN 978-90-272-9004-5.
- Buczek, Katarzyna (2020). "For and Against Anglo-Frisian: The Linguistic Debate on the Matter". In Chruszczewski, Piotr P.; Sauer, Hans (eds.). Mostly Medieval: In Memory of Jacek Frisiak. Beyond Language. Vol. 5. San Diego: Æ Academic Publishing. pp. 245–274. ISBN 978-1-68346-186-9.
- Colleran, Rebecca (2019). "Leveraging grammaticalization: The origins of Old Frisian and Old English". In Claridge, Claudia; Bös, Birte (eds.). Developments in English Historical Morpho-Syntax. Current Issues in Linguistic Theory. Vol. 346. Amsterdam: John Benjamins Publishing Company. pp. 77–110. doi:10.1075/cilt.346. ISBN 978-90-272-6247-9.
- Fulk, R. D. (15 September 2018). A Comparative Grammar of the Early Germanic Languages. Studies in Germanic Linguistics. Vol. 3. John Benjamins. doi:10.1075/sigl.3. ISBN 978-90-272-6313-1. S2CID 165765984.
- Stiles, Patrick (2018). "Remarks on the 'Anglo-Frisian' Thesis". Friesische Studien II: Beiträge des Föhrer Symposiums zur Friesischen Philologie vom 7.–8. April 1994 [Frisian Studies II: Articles from the Föhr Symposium on Frisian Philology on 7th–8th April 1994]. NOWELE Supplement Series. Vol. 12. doi:10.1075/nss.12. ISBN 9789027272843.
- Harbert, Wayne (2007). The Germanic Languages. Cambridge University Press. ISBN 978-0-521-80825-5.
- Voyles, Joseph B. (1992). Early Germanic Grammar: Pre-, Proto-, and Post-Germanic. San Diego: Academic Press. ISBN 0-12-728270-X.
