= Karrharde Frisian =

North Frisian dialect of Germany

- Karrharder
- Native to: Germany
- Region: Südtondern
- Language family: Indo-European: Germanic; West Germanic; Ingvaeonic; Anglo-Frisian; Frisian; North Frisian; Mainland; Karrharde Frisian

Language codes
- ISO 639-3: –
- Glottolog: karr1238
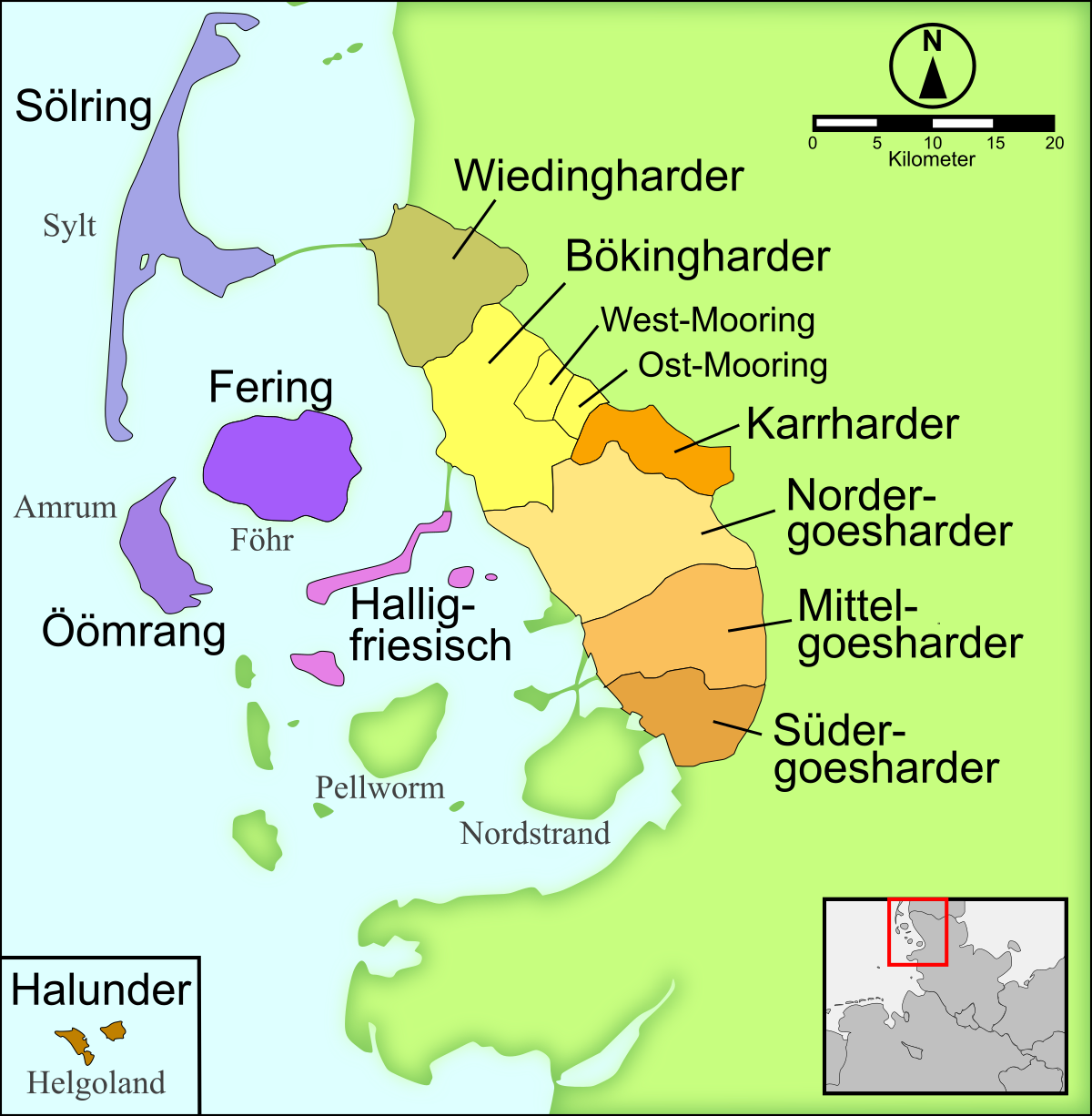
- North Frisian dialects

Karrharde Frisian is a dialect of the North Frisian language spoken in the municipalities of Stedesand and Enge-Sande in the German Amt of Südtondern (formerly Karrharde) in the district of Nordfriesland, Schleswig-Holstein. It is a mainland dialect of North Frisian. The language is in danger of extinction, having a dwindling number of native speakers and no formal schooling offered to educate younger speakers.
