= Heligoland Frisian =

North Frisian language dialect of Heligoland, Germany

- Halunder
- Native to: Germany
- Region: Heligoland
- Native speakers: c. 500 (2009)
- Language family: Indo-European: Germanic; West Germanic; North Sea Germanic; Anglo-Frisian; Frisian; North Frisian; Insular; Heligoland Frisian

Official status
- Official language in: Heligoland

Language codes
- ISO 639-3: –
- Glottolog: helg1238
- Linguasphere: 52-ACA-dbe
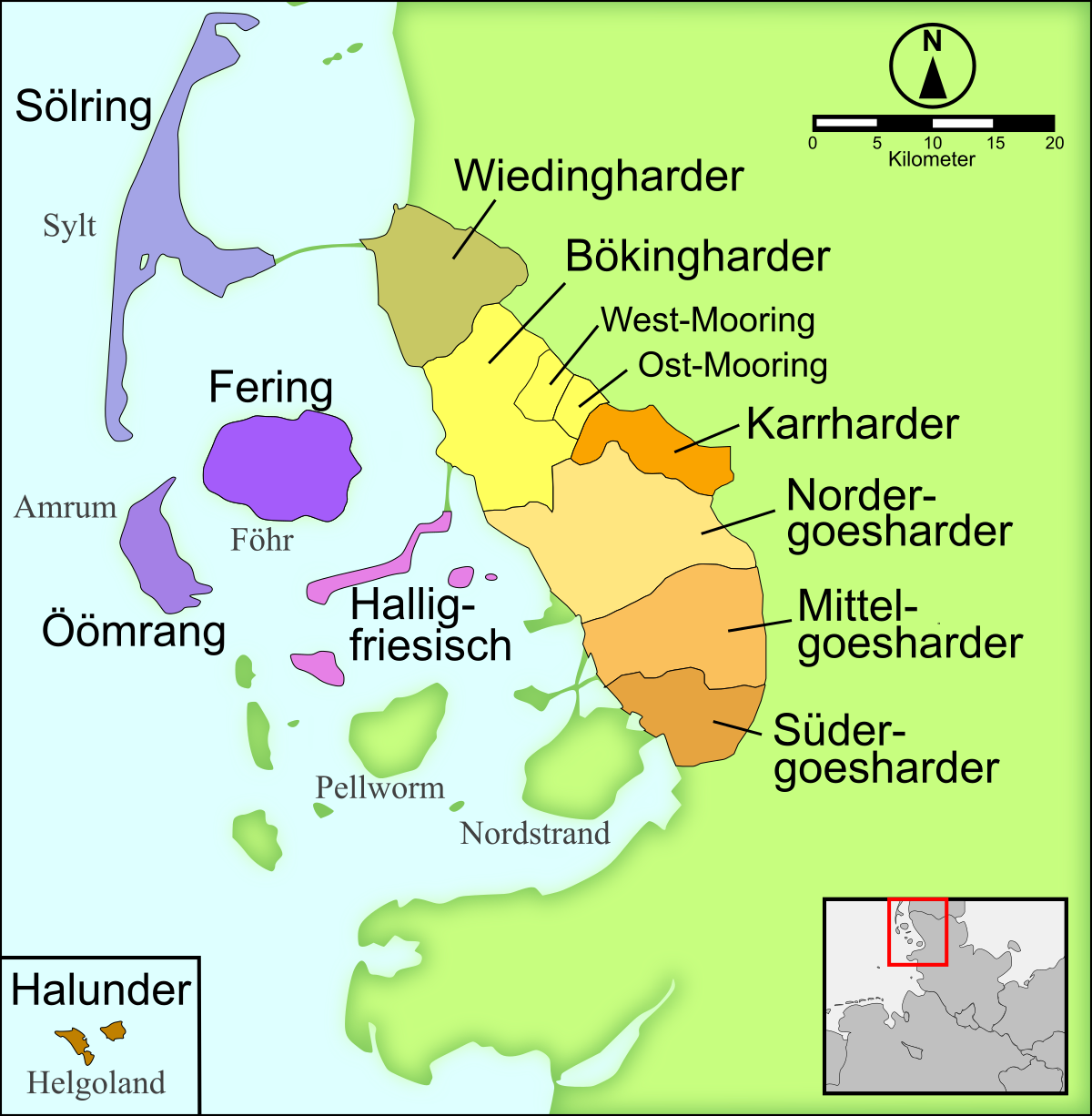
- North Frisian dialects

Heligolandic (Halunder) is the dialect of the North Frisian language spoken on the German island of Heligoland in the North Sea. It is spoken today by some 500 of the island's 1,650 inhabitants and is also taught in schools. Heligolandic is closely related to the insular North Frisian dialects of Fering and Öömrang because medieval fishery around Heligoland attracted Frisians from Föhr and Amrum, and close contacts have been maintained ever since. In fact Fering and Öömrang are closer in linguistic aspects to the dialect of Heligoland than to that of their neighbouring island Sylt, Söl'ring. Heligolandic also contains a variety of loanwords from 19th-century Modern English due to the 83-year British control of the island.

James Krüss is probably the most notable author of poems and narrations in Heligolandic while Maria Leitgeber (1906–1979) wrote the most substantial prose.

On 24 December 2004, a state law became effective in the German state of Schleswig-Holstein that recognises the North Frisian language for official use in the Nordfriesland district and on Heligoland.

== AI based translator ==
Since August 2025 the website halunder.ai offers AI based machine translation between German and Halunder. The tool was developed by Jakob Martens, a 22-year old student from the island. The dictionary contains over 40000 unique words, idioms and samples. The data is based on Heligoland literature and digitized editions of the monthly magazine Der Helgoländer.

== See also ==
- North Frisian language § Insular North Frisian
- Frisian languages
