= Strand Frisian =

Extinct North Frisian dialect

- Region: Strand island; later Nordstrand, Pellworm and Wyk auf Föhr
- Ethnicity: North Frisians
- Language family: Indo-European: Germanic; West Germanic; North Sea Germanic; Anglo-Frisian; Frisian; North Frisian; Mainland; Strand Frisian
- Dialects: Halligen Frisian

Language codes
- ISO 639-3: –
- Glottolog: None

Strand Frisian was a dialect of the North Frisian language which was originally spoken on Strand island, Duchy of Schleswig. Strand was destroyed in the Burchardi flood of 1634 with its remnants forming the islands Pellworm and Nordstrand which are now part of Germany. Strand Frisian is counted among the mainland group of North Frisian dialects.

== History ==
The Frisian language became extinct on Nordstrand in the 17th century while it was spoken on Pellworm until the 18th century. After the 1634 flood, refugees from Strand brought their dialect to Wyk auf Föhr where it was spoken until the 19th century. It is still spoken as Halligen Frisian on the Halligen.

== Notable works ==
The most notable piece of literature in Strand Frisian is a translation of Martin Luther's Small Catechism from the time before 1634. Other works include the "Yn Miren-Söngh" [A Morning Song] and "Yn Een-Söngh" [An Evening Song] by preacher Anton Heimreich (1626–1685) from Nordstrand. Knudt Andreas Frerks (1815–1899), a pastor from Wyk, wrote a translation of the Parable of the Prodigal Son in the Wyk North Frisian dialect.

== Sources ==
- Hofmann, Dietrich (1960). "Der alte friesische Dialekt von Wyk auf Föhr". Fryske Studzjes: Oanbean oan Prof. Dr. J. H. Brouwer op syn 60. jierdei 23 augustus 1960 (in Western Frisian and German). H. J. Prakke & H. M. G. Prakke.
- Holthausen, Ferdinand (1921). "Nordfriesische Studien". Beiträge zur Geschichte der deutschen Sprache und Literatur (in German). 1921 (45). Halle a. S.: 1–50. doi:10.1515/bgsl.1921.1921.45.1. S2CID 202161067. The first part of this is 1. Nordstrander Sprachproben on pp. 1–4.
