= Goesharde Frisian =

North Frisian dialects of Germany

- Gooshiirder
- Native to: Germany
- Region: Goesharde, Nordfriesland
- Language family: Indo-European: Germanic; West Germanic; Ingvaeonic; Anglo-Frisian; Frisian; North Frisian; Mainland; Goesharde Frisian
- Dialects: Northern; Central; Southern †

Language codes
- ISO 639-3: –
- Glottolog: nord1237
- Linguasphere: 52-ACA-eai to 52-ACA-eak
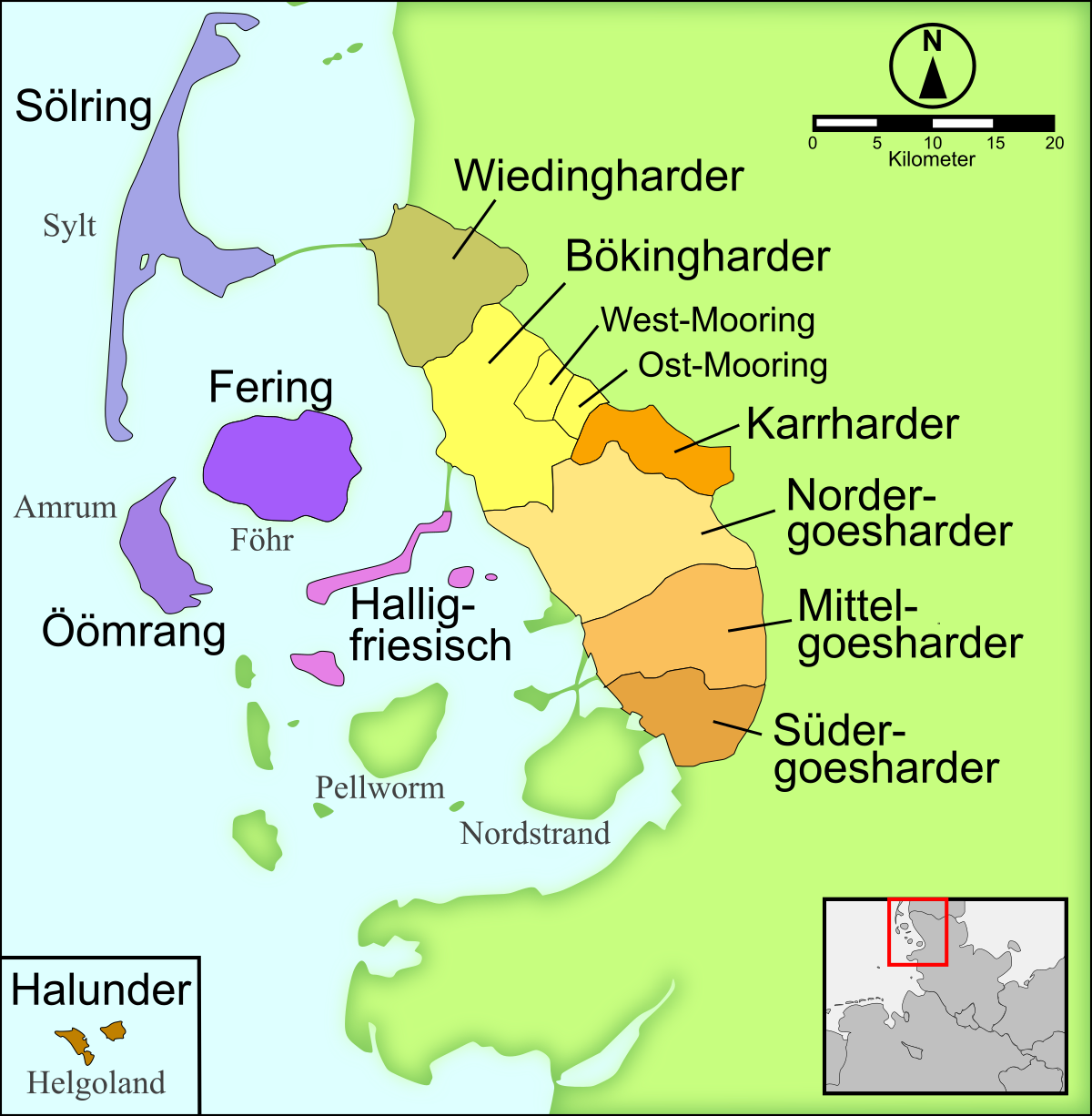
- North Frisian dialects

Goesharde Frisian (North Frisian: Gooshiirder, German: Goesharder Friesisch) is a collective term for three of the ten dialects of the North Frisian language. Goesharde Frisian is spoken in the historical Goesharde region north of Husum. The three distinct dialects are Northern, Central, and Southern Goesharde Frisian. The latter became extinct with the death of the two last speakers in 1980 and 1981 in Hattstedt. Central Goesharde Frisian is therefore now the southernmost dialect of mainland North Frisian. Two local varieties of Northern Goesharde have been extensively catalogued, those spoken around the villages of Langenhorn (Hoorninger Fräisch) and Ockholm (Hoolmer Freesch).

== Current situation ==
The two remaining dialects of Goesharde Frisian are also threatened by acute extinction. Already in the early 20th century only Ockholm in the Northern Goesharde region had been identified as a "truly Frisian" village with a majority of Frisian-speaking households and children. Also the Central Goesharde Frisian is severely threatened. In 2006 the last local speaker died in Bohmstedt and only few speakers are remaining in Drelsdorf.

== Grammar ==
=== Verbs ===
Below are some common verbs in the Ockholm variant of Goesharde Frisian.

	Be	Have
infinitive	wee'e	heewe
past participle	wään	heeft
person	present	
1sg	bän	hääw
2sg	bäst	hääst
3sg	äs	heet
plural	sän	hääwe
person	past	
1 & 3sg	wås	häi
2sg	weerst	häist
pl	weern	häin
