= Sylt North Frisian =

Dialect of the North Frisian language

Sylt Frisian
- Söl'ring
- Native to: Germany
- Region: Sylt, Nordfriesland
- Native speakers: (undated figure of around 500)
- Language family: Indo-European: Germanic; West Germanic; North Sea Germanic; Anglo-Frisian; Frisian; North Frisian; Insular; Sylt Frisian

Language codes
- ISO 639-3: –
- Glottolog: solr1238
- Linguasphere: 52-ACA-da
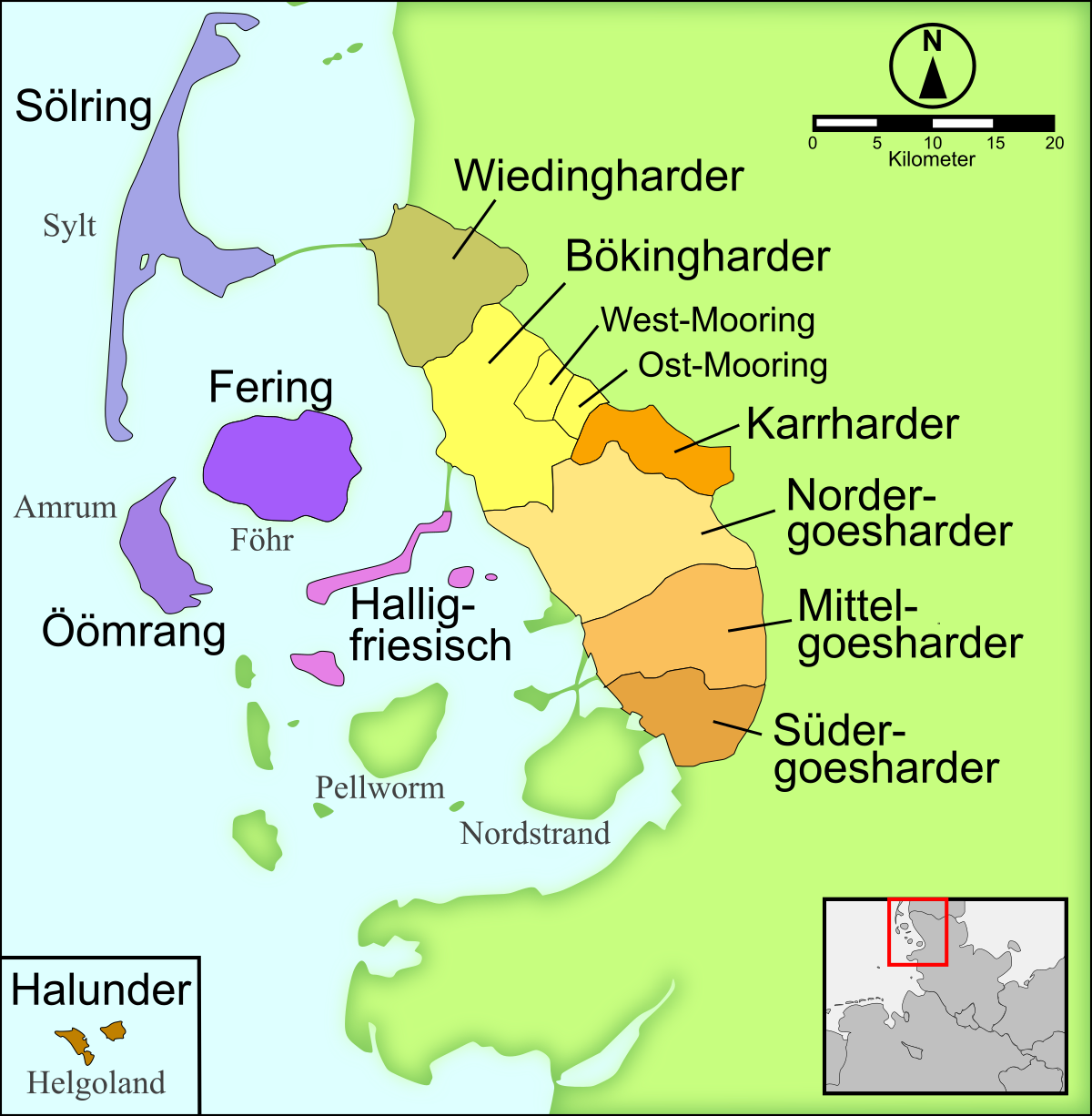
- North Frisian dialects

Sylt Frisian, or Söl'ring, is the dialect of the North Frisian language spoken on the island of Sylt in the German region of North Frisia. Söl'ring refers to the Söl'ring Frisian word for Sylt, Söl'. Together with the Fering, Öömrang, and Heligolandic dialects, it forms part of the insular group of North Frisian dialects. It differs from the mainland dialects because of its relatively strong Danish influence. Due to mass tourism on Sylt, the dialect has been largely displaced by forms of German and Söl'ring is spoken only by a few hundred people, many of whom no longer reside on Sylt. Although it is taught in several primary schools, its prospects for survival are unfavorable compared with other insular dialects.

== Sample text ==
Söl'ring	English
Üüs Söl’ring Lön’, dü best üüs helig; Dü blefst üüs ain, dü best üüs Lek! Din Wiis tö hual’en, sen wü welig; Di Söl’ring Spraak auriit wü ek. Wü bliiv me di ark Tir forbün’en, Sa lung üs wü üp Warel’ sen. Uk diar jaar Uuning bütlön’ fün’en, Ja leng dach altert tö di hen.	Our Sylter Land, thou art to us holy; Thou art our own, thou art our joy! Thine old ways, to them we hold steadfastly; The Sylter tongue we shall not forget. We are forever to thee bound, So long as on this Earth we live. And those who to the Mainland moved, For you they cannot help but yearn there.

== See also ==
- Jens Mungard
