= North Frisian language =

Minority language of Germany

North Frisian
- Sylt: Nuurđfriisk; Föhr/Amrum: nuurdfresk Heligoland: Noortfriisk; Wiedingharde/Halligen: nordfreesk Mooring: nordfrasch Karrharde: nordfräisch Central Goesharde: noordfreesch
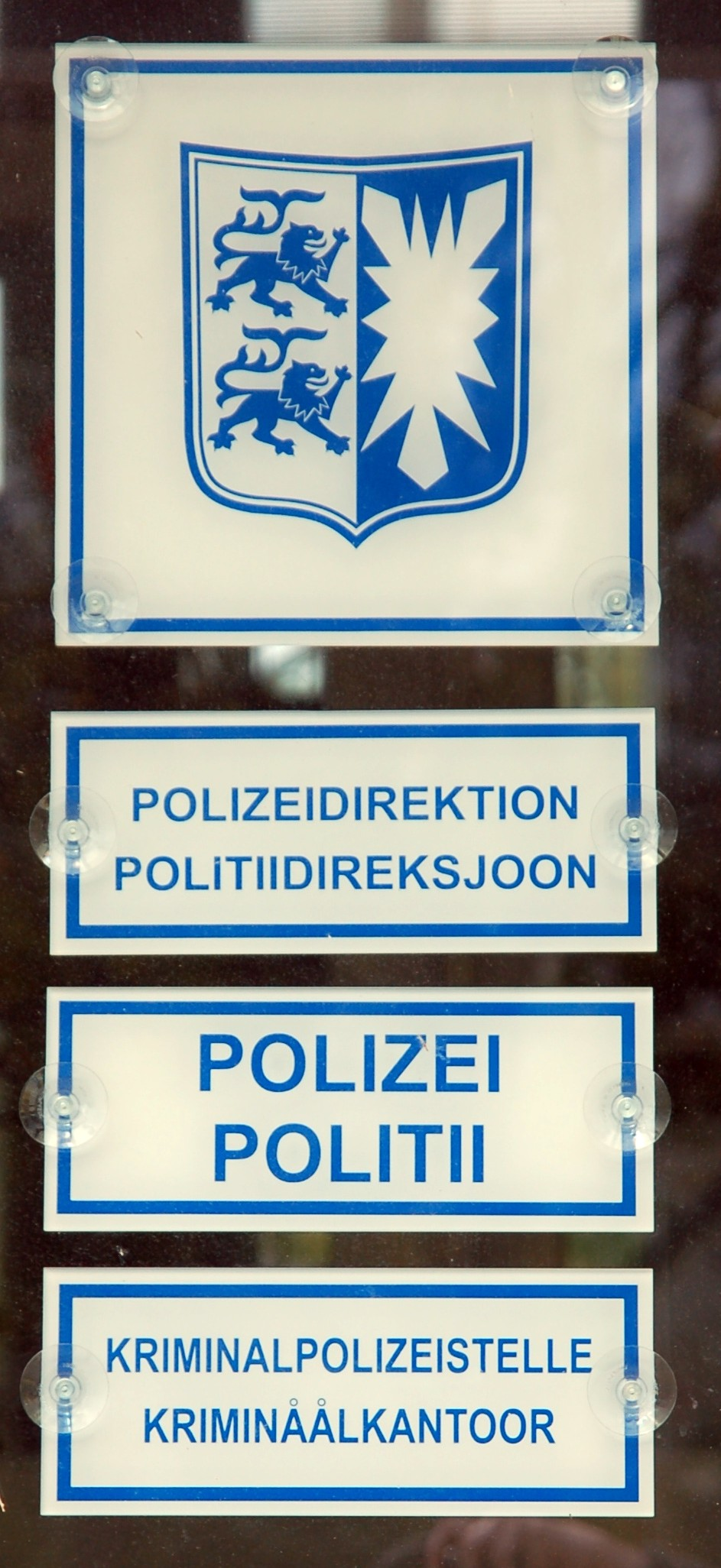
- Bilingual sign in German and North Frisian, respectively, in Husum, Germany
- Native to: Germany
- Region: North Frisia
- Ethnicity: North Frisians
- Native speakers: (10,000 cited 1976)
- Language family: Indo-European: Germanic; West Germanic; North Sea Germanic; Anglo-Frisian?; Frisian; North Frisian
- Writing system: Latin

Official status
- Official language in: Germany: Schleswig-Holstein
- Regulated by: Nordfriisk Instituut

Language codes
- ISO 639-2: frr
- ISO 639-3: frr
- Glottolog: nort2626
- ELP: Northern Frisian
- Linguasphere: 52-ACA-e (varieties: 52-ACA-eaa to -eak & extinct -eba & -ebb)
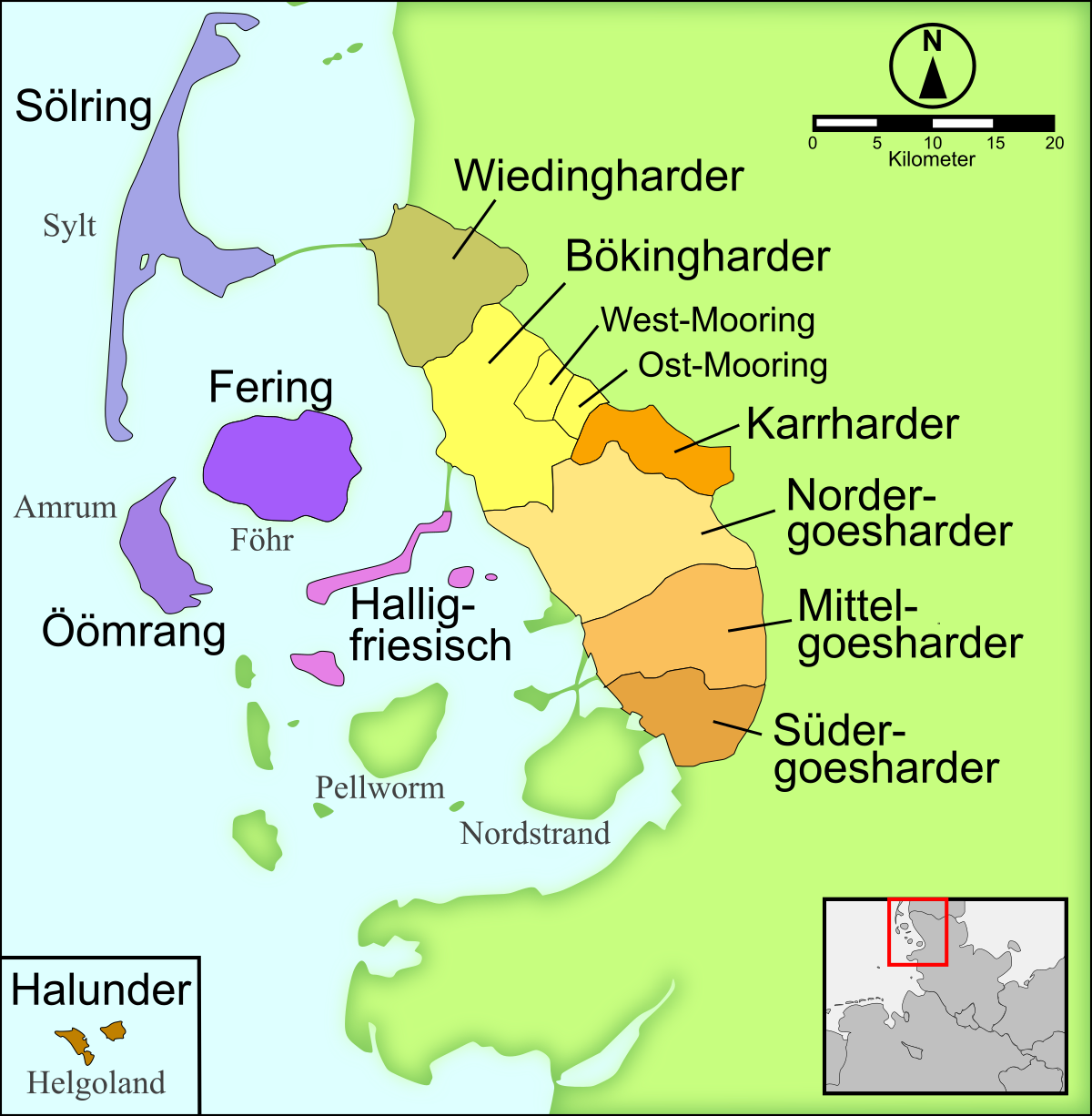
- North Frisian dialects

- North Frisian is classified as Severely Endangered by the UNESCO Atlas of the World's Languages in Danger

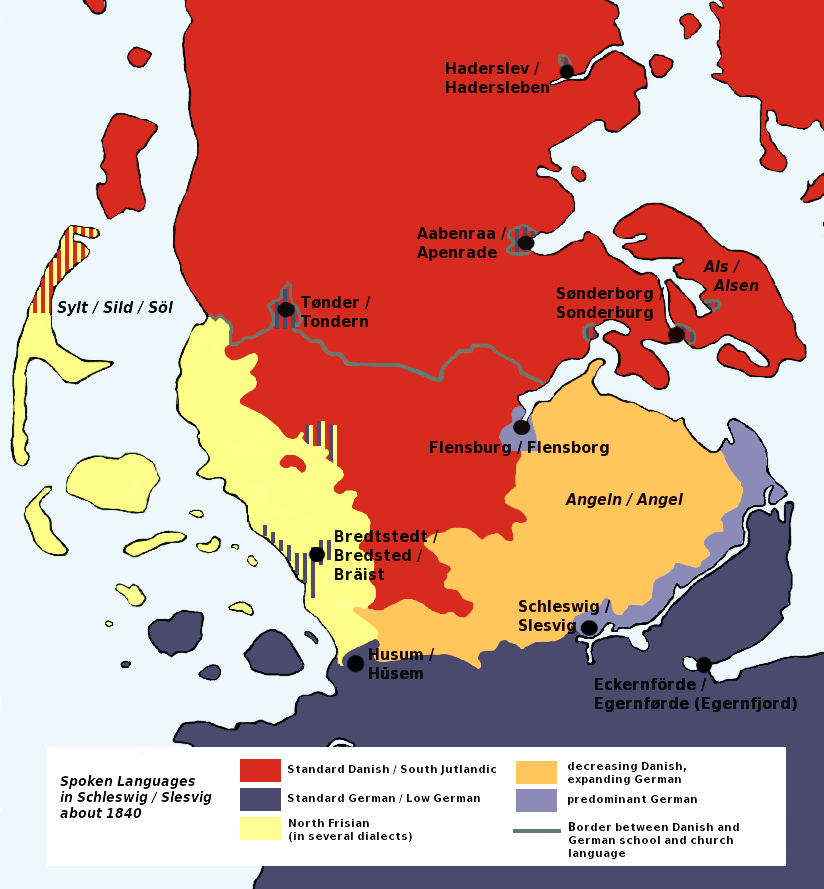
Linguistic map of Schleswig in the mid-19th century

North Frisian is a minority language of Germany, spoken by about 10,000 people in North Frisia. The language is part of the larger group of the West Germanic Frisian languages. The language comprises 10 dialects which are themselves divided into an insular and a mainland group.

North Frisian is closely related to the Saterland Frisian language of Northwest Germany and West Frisian which is spoken in the Netherlands.

North Frisian is relict in Denmark.

== Classification ==
The closest relatives of North Frisian are the two other Frisian languages, the Saterland Frisian of north-western Lower Saxony, Germany, and the West Frisian language spoken in the northern Netherlands. Together, the three sub-groups form the group of Frisian languages.

English and North Frisian are grouped among the Ingvaeonic languages, together with Low German. The related Low German has developed differently since Old Saxon times and has lost many Ingvaeonic characteristics.

== Dialects ==
=== Overview ===
The North Frisian dialects can be grouped into two main dialectal divisions: mainland and insular dialects. Altogether, both groups have 10 dialects. Since the beginning of Frisian linguistic studies in the 19th century, the following ten dialects have typically been noted as distinct:

==== Insular North Frisian ====
- Sylt Frisian (Söl'ring)
- Föhr–Amrum Frisian (Fering, Öömrang)
- Heligolandic Frisian (Halunder)

==== Mainland North Frisian ====
- Wiedingharde Frisian (Wiringhiirder)
- Bökingharde Frisian (Mooringer)
- Karrharde Frisian (Karrharder)
- Goesharde Frisian (Gooshirder)
  - Northern Goesharde Frisian (including Hoorninger Fräisch and Hoolmer Freesch)
  - Central Goesharde Frisian
  - Southern Goesharde Frisian (extinct since early 1980s)
- Halligen Frisian (Halifreesk)

The mainland and insular dialects clearly differ from each other because they were shaped by Frisian immigrants in different centuries. The islands of Sylt, Föhr and Amrum were colonised in around AD 800, and the mainland was settled by Frisians in AD 1100.

There are also various influences of neighbouring languages on the dialects. On Sylt, Föhr and Amrum and in parts of the northern mainland such as Wiedingharde, there is a strong Danish (South Jutlandic) influence, but on Heligoland and the rest of mainland North Frisia, the Low German influence is predominant. Moreover, there has historically been little exchange between the dialects and so hardly any lingua franca could develop and there was no cultural centre in North Frisia for which the dialect could have had a leading role.

=== Samples ===
The sentence displayed below in many variants reads:

"'Shine, old moon, shine!', cried Häwelmann, but the moon was nowhere to be seen and the stars neither; they had all already gone to bed"

(based on Theodor Storm's Der kleine Häwelmann).

Insular

Söl'ring (dialect of Sylt)

"Ljucht, ual Muun, ljucht!" skriilt Häwelmann, man di Muun wiar narigen tö sen en uk di Stiaren ek; ja wiar al altermaal tö Bēr gingen.

Fering-Öömrang (dialect of Föhr and Amrum)

"Locht, ual muun, locht!" rep Heewelmaan, man a muun wiar nochhuaren tu sen an a stäären uk ei; jo wiar al altermaal tu baad gingen.

Heligolandic (dialect of Helgoland)

"Lochte, ool Muun, lochte!" rüp Heäwelman, oawers de Muun wear naarni tu sin'n en uk de Steern ni; dja wear al allemoal tu Baad gingen.

Mainland

Northern Goesharde Frisian, Hoorninger Fräisch variety of Langenhorn

"Jocht, uule moune, jocht!" biilked Hääwelmoon, ors e moune waas närngs to schüns än da steere ok ai; ja weern al aal to beede gingen.

Wiedingharde Frisian

"Ljocht, uuile moone, ljocht!" biilked Hääwelmuon, män e moone was näärgen to schüns än uk e steere ai; jä würn al altomoale to beerd gingen.

Halligen Frisian (although it is spoken on the Halligen islands, it is linguistically grouped with the mainland dialects)

"Jaacht, uale mööne, jaacht!" bölked Hääwelmoon, man de mööne woas näärngs to siinen än de steere uk ee; jä weern al altomaole to beed giangen.

Mooring (dialect of Bökingharde)

"Jucht, üülje moune, jucht!" biiljked Hääwelmoon, ouers e moune wus nargne tu schüns än e stääre uk ai; ja wjarn ål åltumååle tu beed lim.

Despite the differences between the dialects, the Fering and Öömrang are highly similar; in this example nearly identical.

Another source that highlights the differences between all of the main dialects of North Frisian (even extinct ones) are translations of the Lord's Prayer.

The following table further demonstrates the similarities and differences between the various dialects.

| Dialect | Father | Mother | Sister | Brother |
|---|---|---|---|---|
| Söl'ring | Faađer | Mooter | Sester | Bröđer |
| Fering | aatj | mam | saster | bruler |
| Öömrang | aatj | mam | saster | bruder |
| Halligen | baabe | mäm | soster | bröör |
| Halunder | Foor | Mem | Söster | Bruur |
| Wiedingharder Frisian | tääte | määm | Söster | broor |
| Karrharde Frisian | tääte | mäm | Söster | brauder |
| Bökingharde Frisian | taatje | mam | Söster | brouder |
| Central Goesharde Frisian | ate | mäm | Söster | broor |
| Southern Goesharder Frisian | fåår, fååðer | mäm | Söster | brööðer |
| Northern Goesharder Frisian | fååje | mäm | soster | brår |

=== Extinct dialects ===
The Eiderstedt Frisian on the Eiderstedt peninsula were abandoned in favour of Low German during the 17th and 18th centuries. In contrast to the northern hundreds, Eiderstedt was economically strong and wealthy and was oriented towards the southern, Low German parts of Schleswig-Holstein. Moreover, there was a strong Dutch immigration during the 16th century.

A similar situation was to be found on the island of Strand, which was destroyed during the Burchardi flood. The population of the eastern, remaining part of Strand, the modern Nordstrand, did not succeed in rebuilding the dikes on their own. Therefore, many Frisian speaking people left their homeland on Strand or were otherwise not able to maintain their native language against mostly Dutch-speaking immigrants. On Pellworm, the western remainder of Strand, the repair of the dikes was quickly accomplished and so the Frisian language was still spoken in the 18th century, until it also vanished due to changes in population structure. The old Strand Frisian was presumably closest to Halligen Frisian.

Likewise close to Halligen Frisian was the Wyk Frisian that used to be spoken in Wyk auf Föhr until the town completely shifted to Low German. The Wyk dialect is thought to have developed from the dialects of immigrants from the Halligen and Strand island.

The dialect that most recently died out is Southern Goesharde Frisian which became extinct with the death of its last speaker in the early 1980s. Other mainland dialects are also facing extinction.

North of the German-Danish border North Frisian was spoken only in some marsh-farms, located directly at the border.

== Phonology ==
=== Consonants ===
| | | Labial | Alveolar | | Post- alveolar | Dorsal | Glottal |
| | | Labial | plain | pal. | Post- alveolar | Dorsal | Glottal |
|---|---|---|---|---|---|---|---|
| Stop | voiceless | p | t | tʲ | | k | |
| Stop | voiced | b | d | dʲ | | ɡ | |
| Fricative | voiceless | f | s | | ʃ | x | h |
| Fricative | voiced | v | z | | | | |
| Nasal | | m | n | nʲ | | ŋ | |
| Trill | | | r | | | | |
| Approximant | | | l | lʲ | | j | |

- The Föhr (Weesdring) dialect contrasts dental /t̪, d̪, s̪, z̪, n̪, l̪/ with alveolar /t, d, s, z, n, l/.
- /z/ is replaced with a non-sibilant sound /ð/ in the Sylt dialect.
- The alveolar trill /r/ is replaced with the uvular /ʀ/ in the Bökingharde (Mooring) dialect.

=== Vowels ===
| | Front | | | | Central | Back | |
| | unrounded | | rounded | | Central | Back | |
| | short | long | short | long | Central | short | long |
|---|---|---|---|---|---|---|---|
| Close | i | iː | | yː | | | uː |
| Near-close | ɪ | | ʏ | | | ʊ | |
| Close-mid | e | eː | | øː | ə | | oː |
| Open-mid | ɛ | ɛː | œ | œː | | ɔ | ɔː |
| Open | | aː | | | a | | ɒː |

Diphthongs
| | Front | | Back |
|---|---|---|---|
| Close | ia | | ua, ui |
| Mid | øi | | ou |
| Mid | ɛi | œi | ɔi, ɔˑi |
| Open | ai, aˑi | | au, ɒːi |

- One triphthong sound /uai/ only occurs in the Föhr dialect.
- /ia/ and /ua/ do not occur in the Bökingharde (mainland) dialect.
- /øi/ and /ɒːi/ only occur in the Föhr dialect.
- /aˑi/, /œi/, /ɔˑi/, and /ou/ only occur in the Bökingharde dialect.

Despite the strong differences among the North Frisian dialects, there are still some traits of phonology that are more or less common to all dialects. Among them is the lowering from [ɪ] to [a], which is mostly complete in the central dialects but is only at the stage [ɛ] or [eː] in the periphery. For example, the word "fish" translates to Mooring fasch and Fering-Öömrang fask but Söl'ring fesk (cf. Low German: Fisch/Fisk, Danish: fisk, German: Fisch, Dutch: vis).

The distribution of the lenition of the unvoiced plosives p, t and k is similar as they have become voiced plosives and partially even developed to fricatives in the central dialects. That can be demonstrated from the verb "to know": Mooring waase, Fering-Öömrang wed, Sölring weet, Halunder wet (cf. West Frisian witte, Low German weten, German wissen).

The North Frisian dialects differ from modern Standard German by a more diverse system of diphthongs and consonants. All of the dialects have an additional line of palatalizations, which is uncommon for a Germanic language. Until recently, an additional number of dental consonants contrasted phonemically with their alveolar counterparts in the dialect of Föhr. In general, the insular dialects feature a relatively complicated consonantal system, but the mainland dialects have more diverse vowels.

Recently, the phonological system of the North Frisian dialects has been strongly influenced by Standard German and is slowly adapting to its system.

== Current situation ==
Officially, the number of North Frisian speakers ranges from 8,000 to 10,000 but linguists propose significantly lower numbers. In 2007, Århammar estimated a total of 5,000 speakers inside and 1,500 to 2,000 speakers outside North Frisia proper. Exact surveys do not exist.

North Frisian is an endangered language, as in most places, children no longer learn it. In UNESCO's Atlas of the World's Languages in Danger, North Frisian is classified as "severely endangered". Exceptions are a few villages on the islands of Föhr and Amrum and the Risum-Lindholm area. Especially in the western parts of Föhr, the language community is still relatively common. The number of speakers on Föhr and Amrum alone is estimated to around 3,500. The other dialects are, in fact, seriously endangered, like Karrharde Frisian, Central Goesharde and Halligen Frisian.

The elementary and grammar school on Amrum is called Öömrang Skuul and, among other subjects, focuses on teaching the local dialect. Fering is also taught in schools on Föhr and the Risum Skole/Risem Schölj in Risum-Lindholm on the mainland is a combined Danish-North Frisian elementary school.

All speakers of North Frisian are at least bilingual (North Frisian and German). Many are trilingual (North Frisian, German and Low German) and, especially along the Danish border, quadrilingualism used to be widespread (North Frisian, Standard German, Low German and South Jutlandic).

In Schleswig-Holstein, North Frisian is protected by the European Charter for Regional or Minority Languages as a minority language. On 24 December 2004 a state law became effective in Schleswig-Holstein that recognises the North Frisian language for official use in the Nordfriesland district and on Heligoland.

== See also ==
- Frisian languages
- North Frisia
- Frisians
- Frisian Islands
