= Lundenberg Hundred =

Mediaeval area of North Frisia, Schleswig

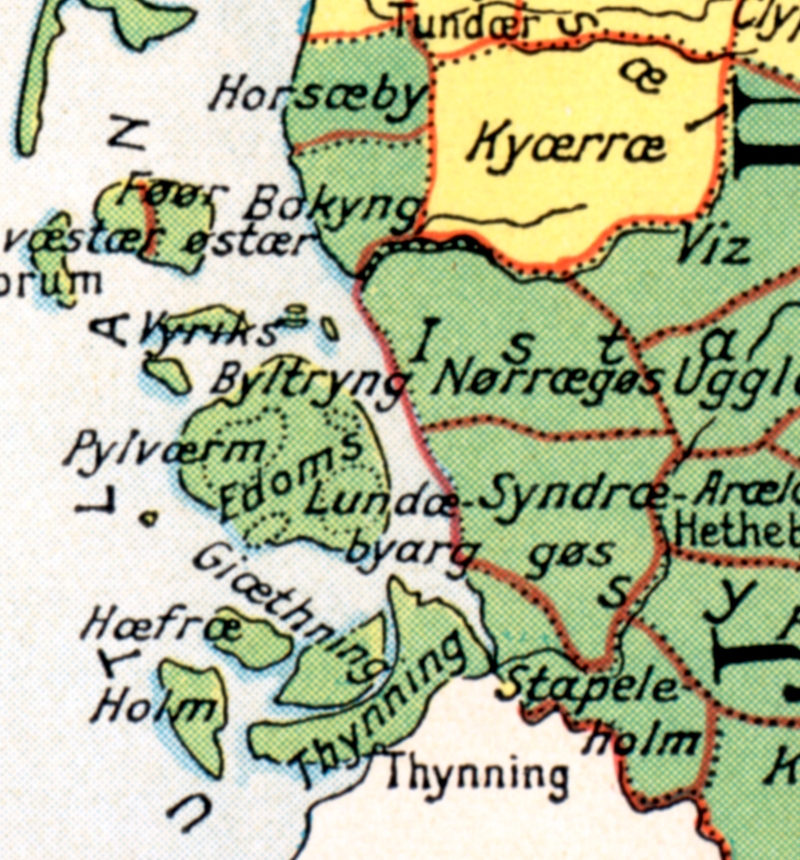
Lundenberg Hundred in the Middle Ages

Lundenberg Hundred (German: Lundenbergharde; Danish: Lundebjerg Herred, older: Lundæbyarg Herred) was a mediaeval hundred located in the southern part of North Frisia in the Danish region of Southern Schleswig, part of the Frisian Uthlande. Lundenberg Hundred was one of the so-called Five Hundreds or Strand Hundreds on the island, the others being Edoms Hundred, Beltring Hundred, Southern Goes Hundred, and Pellworm Hundred. It encompassed the southeastern part of the former island of Strand, between what are now the peninsulae of Nordstrand and Eiderstedt.

The hundred was split in two as a result of the Grote Mandrenke in 1362. The towns of Ham and Lith, located north of the Heverstrom tidal creek, became part of Edoms Hundred. These towns were flooded and sank into the sea along with most of the island of Strand itself during the Burchardi flood of 1634. The southern part of the hundred did not entirely sink in the storm, but was nevertheless heavily damaged by waves, which completely destroyed the towns of Lundenberg and Padelack.

Today, remnants of the old hundred are now part of the island-turned-peninsula of Nordstrand, as well as the site of the town of Simonsberg, Germany, located southwest of Husum.
