= Pellworm Hundred =

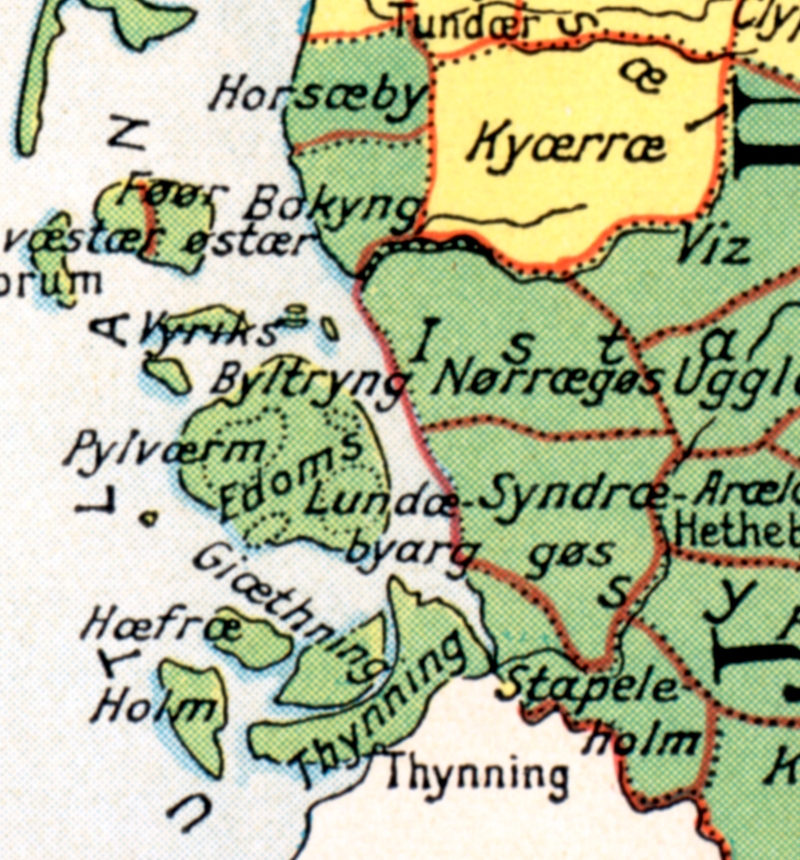
Pellworm Hundred in the Middle Ages

Pellworm Hundred (German: Pellwormharde; Danish: Pelvorm Herred, older: Pylværm Herred) was a mediaeval hundred located in the southern part of North Frisia in the Danish region of Southern Schleswig, part of the Frisian Uthlande. It encompassed the western part of the island of Strand, which sank in 1634 during the Burchardi flood. Pellworm Hundred was one of the so-called Five Hundreds or Strand Hundreds on the island, the others being Edoms Hundred, Beltring Hundred, Southern Goes Hundred, and Lundenberg Hundred. The land that remained of the hundred after the flood is now largely geographically part of the modern island of Pellworm in the German state of Schleswig-Holstein.
