= Beltring Hundred =

Mediaeval county division in Denmark

Coordinates: 54°34′N 8°48′E

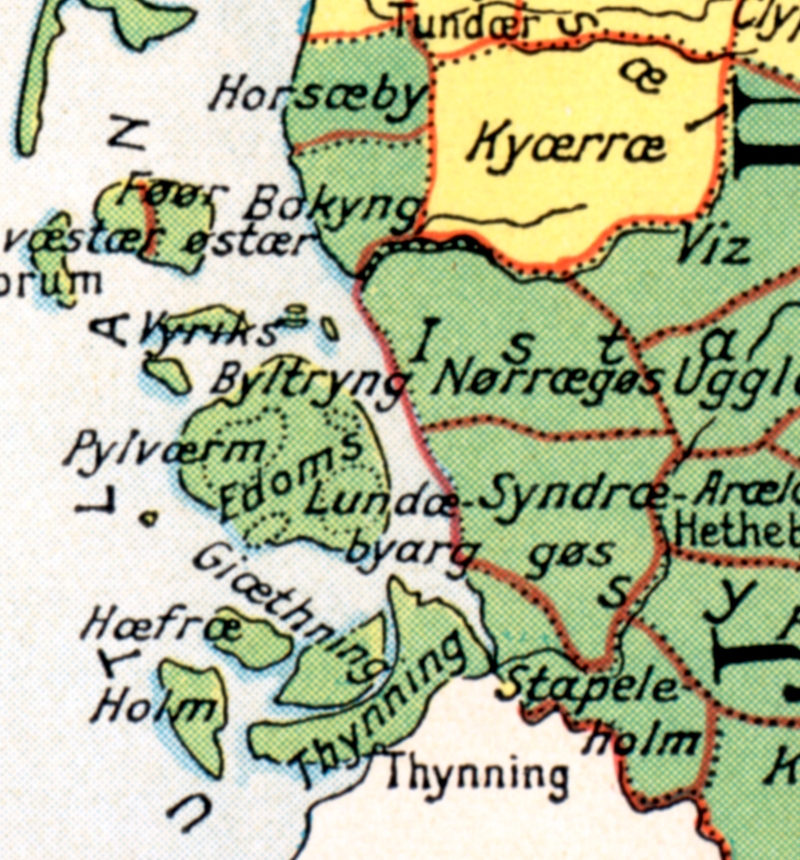
Map of North Frisian hundreds in the Middle Ages. Beltring Hundred can be seen on the island in the centre.

Beltring Hundred (German: Beltringharde; Danish: Beltring Herred, older: Byltryng Herred) was a mediaeval hundred in the southern part of North Frisia, in the Danish duchy of Schleswig and part of the Frisian Uthlande.It encompassed the northern part of the island of Strand, much of which was submerged during the Burchardi flood of 1634. Some of the land of Beltring Hundred survived the flood, however, and became the Hallig of Nordstrandischmoor as well as the site of the modern municipality of Ockholm. Beltring Hundred was one of the so-called Five Hundreds or Strand Hundreds on the island, the others being Edoms Hundred, Pellworm Hundred, Southern Goes Hundred, and Lundenberg Hundred.

The hundred gave its name to Beltringharder Koog, a polder (German: Koog) created in 1987 by embanking the Nordstrand Bay between Nordstrand and the North Frisian mainland, which turned Nordstrand into a peninsula; the polder is named for its location within the area of the mediaeval hundred.
