= Edoms Hundred =

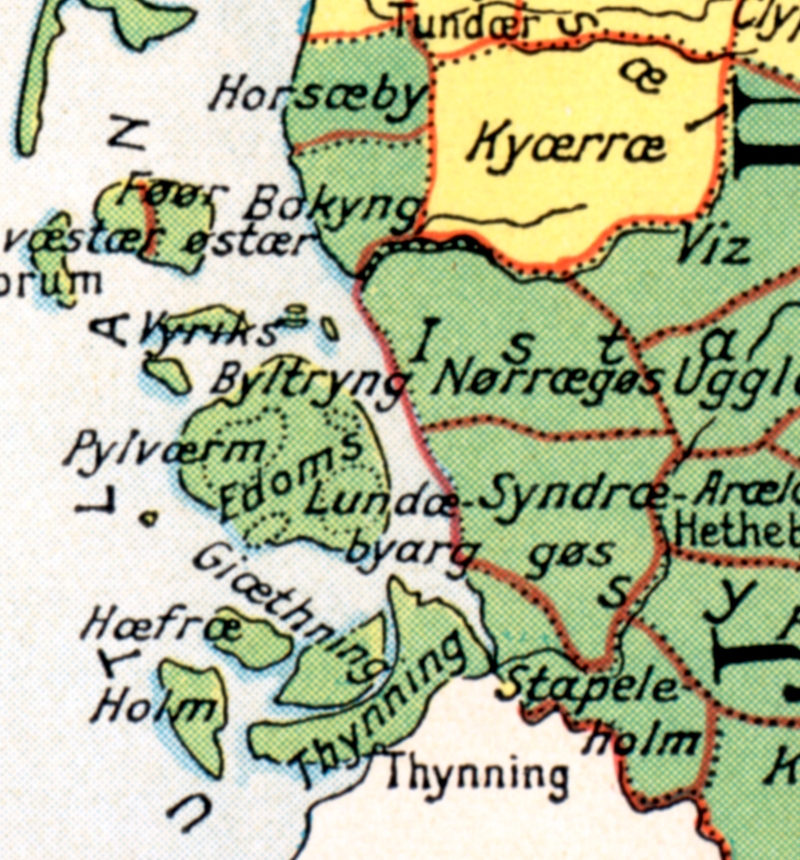
Map of North Frisian hundreds in the Middle Ages. Edoms Hundred can be seen on the island in the centre.

Edoms Hundred (German: Edomsharde, Danish: Edoms Herred) was a mediaeval hundred located in the southern part of North Frisia in the Danish region of Southern Schleswig, part of the Frisian Uthlande. It encompassed the eastern part of the island of Strand, which sank in 1634 during the Burchardi flood, including some of the land which now comprises the peninsula of Nordstrand. Edoms Hundred bordered the other so-called Five Hundreds or Strand Hundreds on the island: Beltring Hundred to the north, Pellworm Hundred to the west, Southern Goes Hundred to the east, and Lundenberg Hundred to the south.

The wealthy settlement Rungholt was located in Edoms Hundred until it was destroyed by a storm flood in 1362. The farmers of Edoms Hundred were influential enough to sign treaties with the Counts of Flanders and merchants from Hamburg.
