= Cord Widderich =

15th-century pirate

Cord Widderich, c. 1410

Cord Widderich (alternative spelling: Kort Wiederich) (died 1447) was a pirate active during political conflicts between Dithmarschen and North Frisia in the early fifteenth century. He lived during the times of Klaus Störtebeker and the Victual Brothers, but was not part of their movement.

== History ==
North Frisia aided Holstein when it declared war on Dithmarschen in 1404. After Dithmarschen defeated Holstein, a peace treaty prohibited further military campaigns. Instead, Cord Widderich and other Dithmarsians took revenge on their Frisian neighbors via piracy.

In 1407, Cord Widderich and his men from Lunden, Germany occupied Eiderstedt and made the Pellworm church tower their base for looting the surrounding villages and tricking ships into stranding. Only when the church tower swayed with the wind and a storm threatened to topple the building did Widderich and his men leave North Frisia for good.

During his retreat from Pellworm, Widderich carried off a number of treasures from the church. The most famous part of his booty was a bronze baptismal font from the thirteenth century, which he gave as a consecration gift to the newly built Saint Clemens church of Büsum, Dithmarschen, where it resides to this day. Widderich settled in Büsum as a trader in about 1412.

In 1447, Cord Widderich stayed at an inn in Segeberg, Holstein, during a pilgrimage to Wilsnack in Brandenburg. The next morning, he was captured and hanged without trial by Klaus von dem Damme, reeve for Count Henry of Segeberg.
