= Uthlande =

Historical region in Germany and Denmark

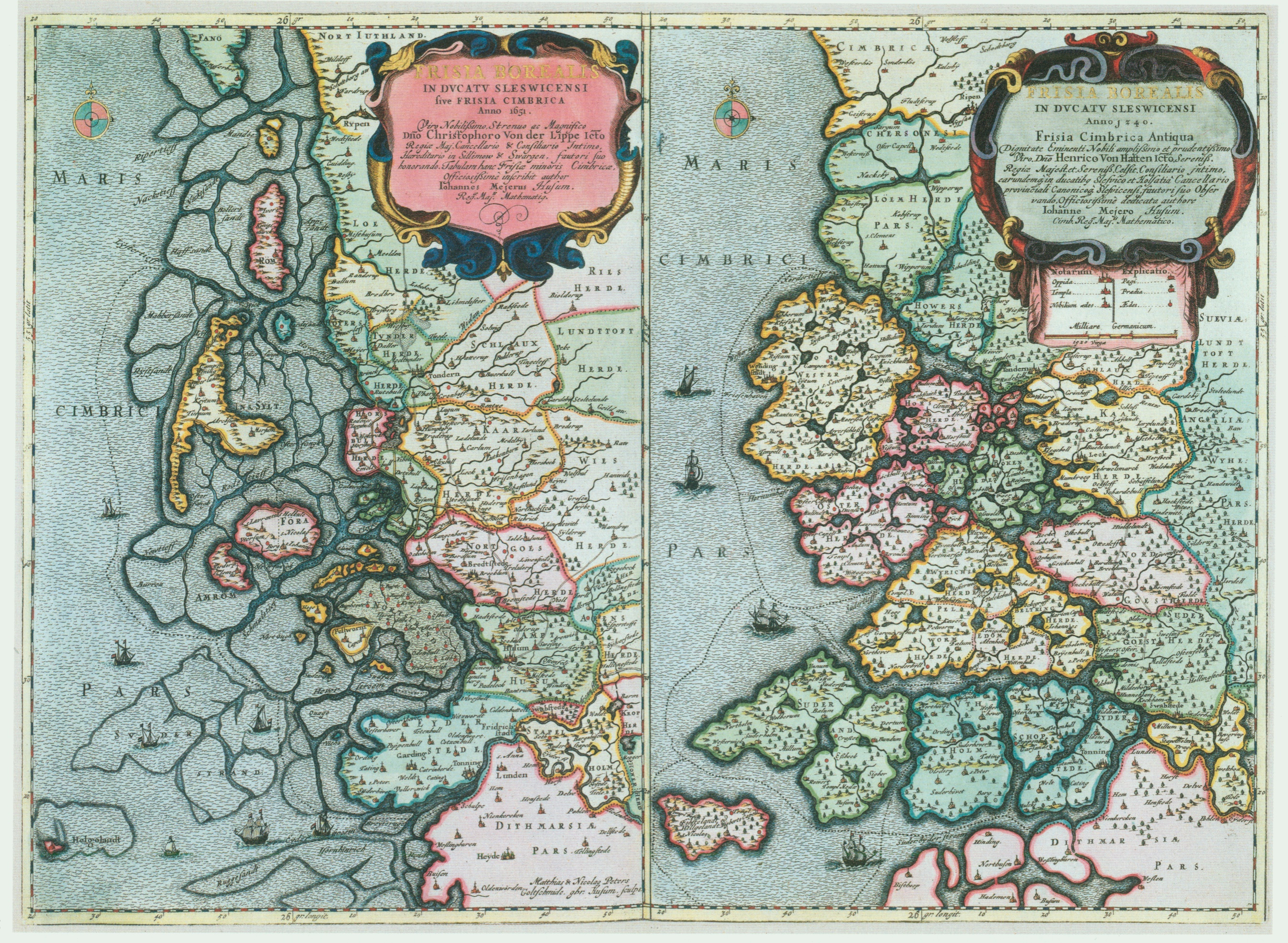
Maps of North Frisia in 1651 (left) and 1240 (right) as drawn by cartographer Johannes Mejer (died 1674). Note the change in the coastline with submerged areas being indicated in the 1651 panel.

Uthlande, Utlande (Low German or Old Danish: The outer lands, in Danish also: Friselagen) is a term for the islands, halligen and marshes off the mainland of North Frisia in the Southwest Jutland, modern Nordfriesland district, Germany.

== History ==
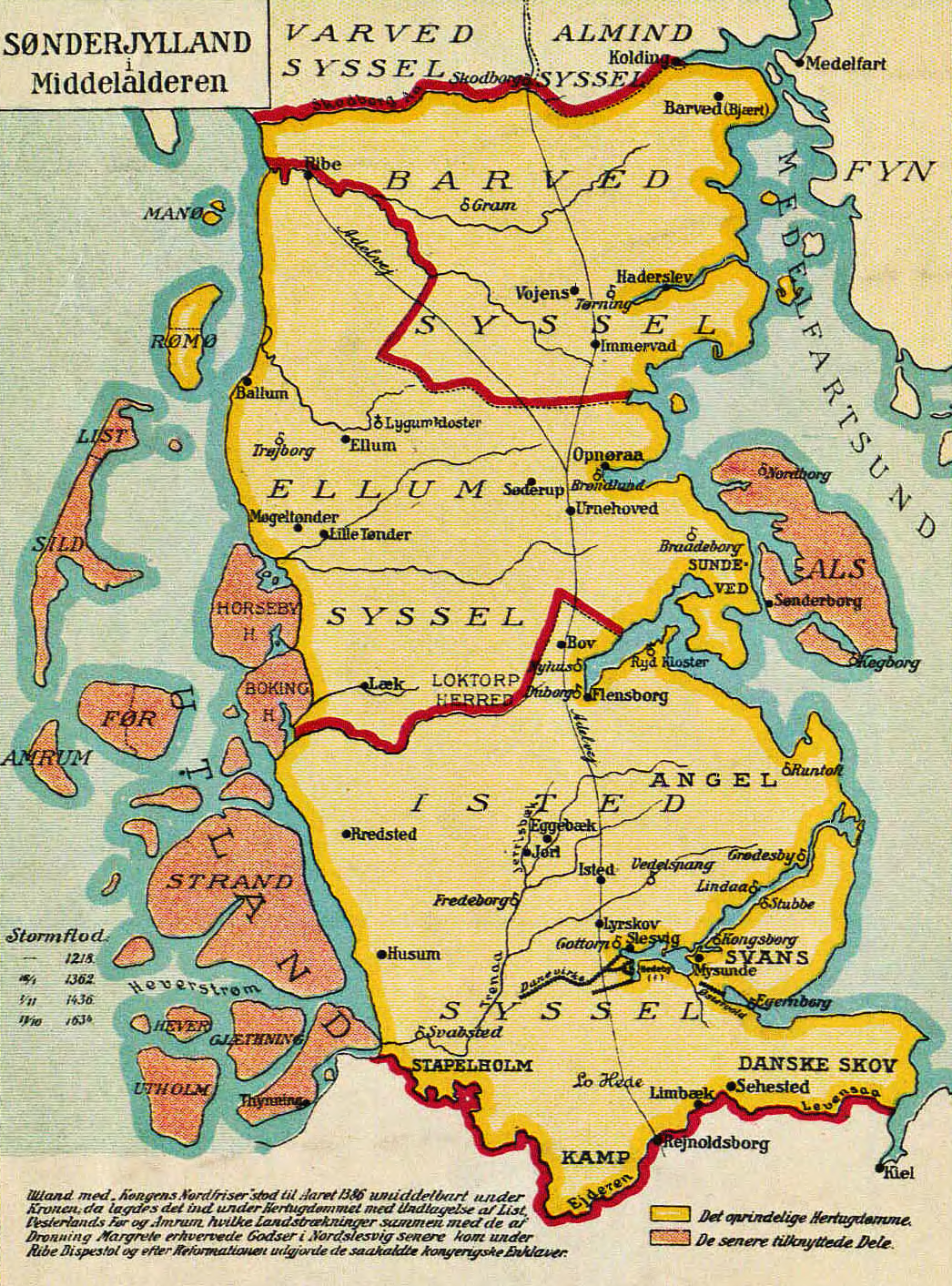
During the Nordic Middle Ages, the mainland part of Schleswig was divided into three sýslur, viz. Barved, Ellum and Isted. The North Frisian Islands were known as Utlande.

The name was first recorded in a 12th-century document. At the time, the islands differed considerably from the mainland regarding both their social constitution and political status. Today parts of the former Uthlande are submerged in the Wadden Sea — especially large parts of the island Strand — or have themselves become a part of the mainland by the construction of dikes or land reclamation.

On the Danish mainland the Hundreds later became the largest administrative subdivisions. They were composed of several parishes. In mainland Jutland there were also the syssels which used to comprise a number of Hundreds, but were completely unknown in the Uthlande. The local North Frisians became direct subjects of the Danish king and fought for him against the Holy Roman Empire and Holstein. However they succeeded in gaining a large-scale autonomy in the Middle Ages. They were exempt from the Code of Jutland of 1241 and were allowed to judge according to Frisian law (see also Lex Frisionum).

When Eric IV of Denmark tried to collect the plogpennig, a tax of one penny on every plow, in the Uthlande as well, he was forced to leave the area after having lost a number of knights due to resistance against the new tax law. His brother, killer and successor Abel even lost the greatest part of his army and his life when he tried to again enforce the plogpennig in Frisia in 1252.

In 1261 the city of Hamburg signed a peace treaty with Utlandia but it is unclear whether this meant only the three Hundreds of Eiderstedt or the entire Uthlande. Until 1284, central administrative powers had become established in a way that Valdemar IV, Duke of Schleswig was able to contract a treaty with Bremen in the name of the Frisians.

=== Hundreds of the Uthlande ===
During the Middle Ages, the following Hundreds (Harden) were part of the Uthlande:

- Bökingharde (Danish Bøking Herred, North Frisian Böökinghiird; approximately the area of the modern Bökingharde), today a part of the mainland
- Horsbüllharde (Danish Horsbøl Herred; approximately the area of the modern Wiedingharde), today a part of the mainland
- Wiriksharde (Danish Viriks Herred; approximately the area of Hallig Langeness)
- Beltring Hundred (Danish Beltring Herred; north-eastern part of Strand), mostly submerged
- Föhr Osterharde (Danish Før Østerherred; approximately the eastern part of Föhr), still an island
- Föhr Westerharde (Danish Før Vesterherred; approximately the western part of Föhr plus Amrum), still on two islands
- Pellworm Hundred (Danish Pelvorm Herred; southwestern part of Strand, roughly modern-day Pellworm), island, partly submerged
- Edoms Hundred (Danish Edoms Herred; southern part of Strand including the submerged town of Rungholt), mostly submerged today
- Lundenberg Hundred (Danish Lundebjerg Herred; south-eastern part of Strand, approximately modern Nordstrand), today a peninsula
- Sylt (Danish Sild, North Frisian Söl), still an island
- Eiderstedt (Danish Ejdersted, North Frisian Ääderstää; eastern part of today's Eiderstedt peninsula)
- Evershop (north-western part of modern Eiderstedt including Westerhever, then an island), today a peninsula
- Utholm (Danish Udholm; south-western part of modern Eiderstedt including Sankt Peter-Ording, then an island), today a peninsula

This list of areas varies according to sources and years and the shape of the coastline has changed considerably during the last centuries. Important sources include the Danish Census Book of king Valdemar II of Denmark, and historicising maps by Johannes Mejer (printed in 1652). In the Census Book there is a separate list of all inhabited islands of the west coast. The three placenames Gaestaenacka, Hwaelae major and Hwaelae minor that are mentioned there cannot be found and confirmed today. The common assumption that these islands lay west off Strand and were destroyed in 14th century storm surges is contested. The names may have resulted from faulty transcriptions by a scribe who tried to translate the names of DeStrand, Eydaerstath and Hewerschop into Latin language.

== Uthlande Region ==
In 2002 the association Regionale Partnerschaft Uthlande e.V. was established which aims to promote the "Region Uthlande" that comprises the islands and halligen of Nordfriesland.
