= Büsum =

- Municipality
- Coat of arms

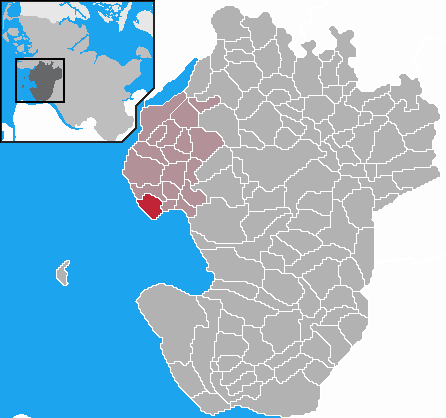
- Location of Büsum within Dithmarschen district
- Interactive map of Büsum
- Location within Germany Location within Schleswig-Holstein
- Coordinates: 54°08′N 08°51′E
- Country: Germany
- State: Schleswig-Holstein
- District: Dithmarschen
- Municipal assoc.: Büsum-Wesselburen

Government
  - Mayor: Oliver Kumbartzky (FDP)

Area
  - Total: 8.48 km^{2} (3.27 sq mi)
- Elevation: 2 m (6.6 ft)

Population (2025-12-31)
  - Total: 5,211
  - Density: 615/km^{2} (1,590/sq mi)
- Time zone: UTC+01:00 (CET)
  - Summer (DST): UTC+02:00 (CEST)
- Postal codes: 25757–25761
- Dialling codes: 04834
- Vehicle registration: HEI
- Website: www.buesum.de

Büsum (German pronunciation: [ˈbyːzʊm]) is a fishing and tourist town in the district of Dithmarschen, in Schleswig-Holstein, Germany. It is situated on the North Sea coast, approx. 18 km (12 miles) southwest of Heide.

Büsum is also the administrative seat of the Amt ("collective municipality") Büsum-Wesselburen.

== History and geography ==
The first documented mention of Büsum (as an island) dates from the year 1140. The island's name on medieval documents changed several times from the original Bivsne (1140) to Busin (1208), Busen (1281), and Buzen (1447). Büsum's medieval history has been documented through the chronicles of Neocorus (Johannes Adolph Köster), a pastor and teacher in Büsum during the 16th century.

=== Geographical history ===
During medieval times, Büsum was an island with three villages, Süderdorp, Middeldorp and Norddorp. Devastating floods in 1362 (Grote Mandrenke), 1436, and 1570 (All Saint's Flood) drowned most of the island and destroyed the two settlements Süderdorp and Middeldorp. The former Norddorp with the St. Clemens church nowadays forms the old core of the town Büsum.

In 1585, the island was connected with the mainland through the building of a dam. Subsequent deposits of sediment by the sea created new land, which was further secured through dikes. Storm floods continued to take their toll as documented in the St. Clemens church with a tabloid commemorating the Burchardi flood of 1634 flood, which killed 168 people and destroyed 102 homes in Büsum. During the devastating Christmas flood of 1717, the village Werven near Büsum sank completely. The last great flood happened during February 1825. Since then, the improved dikes have been able to protect the town from storm tides.

=== Political history ===
The island of Büsum was originally beholden to the bishopric of Hamburg and Bremen before Dithmarschen became a confederated peasant's republic. From 1559 until 1867, Büsum (and Dithmarschen) were Danish territory and subsequently became part of Prussia. After World War II, Büsum was part of the British Zone until 1955.

==== Medieval alliances and piracy ====
During medieval times, Büsum was frequently visited by traders of the Hanseatic League. The Hansa was the main ally of Dithmarschen, but the peasants' republic never became part of the Hanseatic League itself. The people of the comparatively poor island Büsum often resorted to piracy to better their lives, resulting in repeated conflicts. In 1420, Rackler Kersten and his men from Büsum sailed into the harbor of Hamburg to scuttle and loot Hanseatic trading ships. In retaliation, the Hamburgers pillaged and burned the island's church in Middeldorp. The new church was built in Norddorp and furnished with several items looted from the island Pellworm by the pirate Cord Widderich.

==== World War II bombing ====
During World War II, the shipyard and harbor in Büsum were used by the Kriegsmarine, making it a target for an air raid. Büsum was bombed on May 4, 1945, the day German troops surrendered in northern Germany and thus the last day of war in the region. Nine people lost their lives, 19 were injured, and five houses were completely destroyed.

== Economy ==
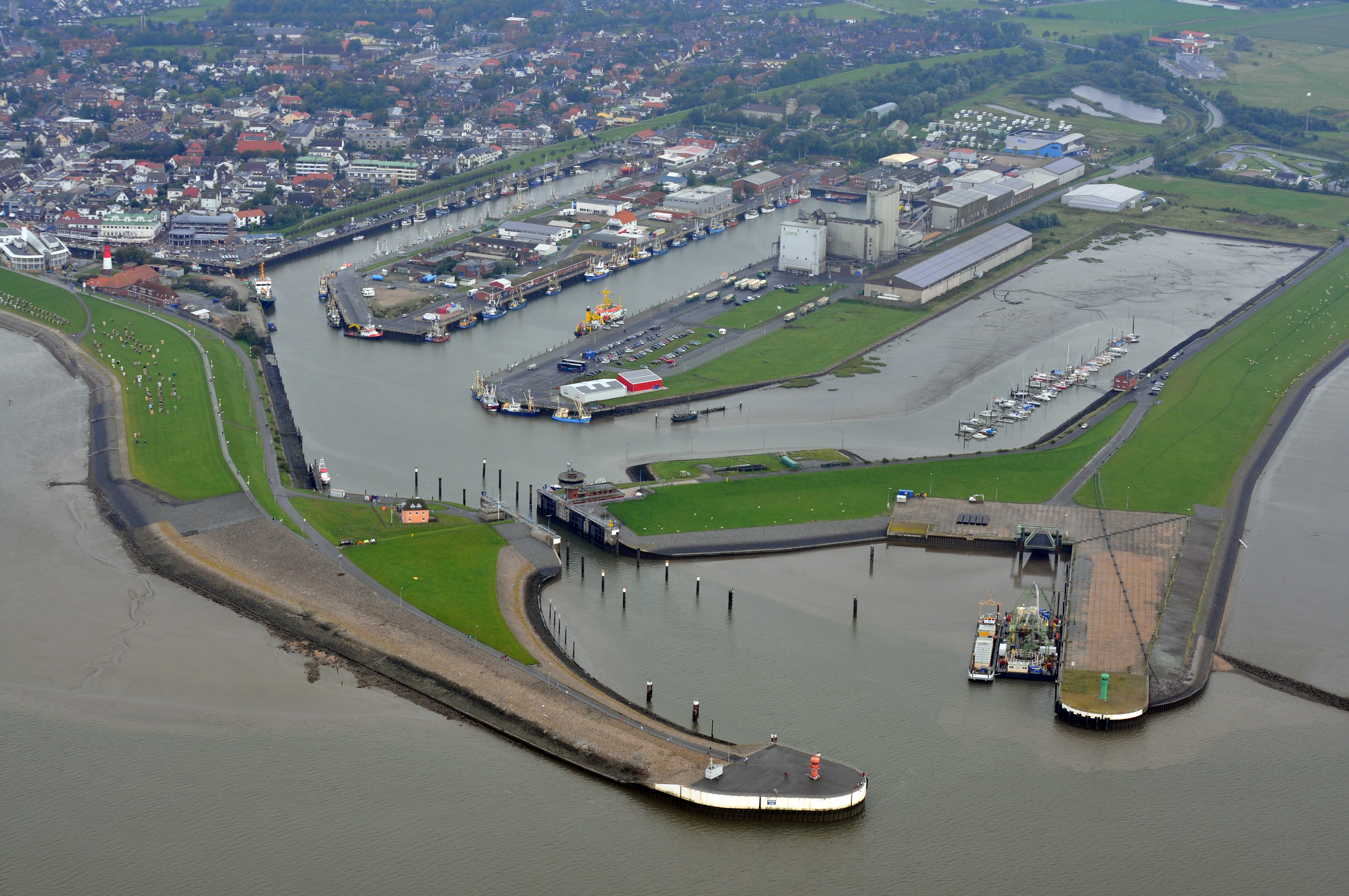
Büsum harbour seen from above

=== Fishing ===
Neocorus reported that the main source of living for the people of Büsum during his times were fishing and farming. Büsum as a fisher town is primarily known for its specialty Büsumer Krabben (North Sea shrimp, Crangon crangon), which are processed and canned for sale. The first records of shrimping in Büsum date from 1624. During this time, shrimp fishing was mostly done by women with nets in the tidal gullies of the Wadden Sea. At the end of the 19th century, fishing on the high seas became popular and added the need for seafaring fishing boats. Before World War II, Büsum's fishing fleet counted 132 vessels. Since then, the number of fishing vessels has continuously decreased. In 1998, Büsum's fishing fleet consisted of 35 fishing boats, with the harbor hosting 20 additional fishing vessels, mainly from the Netherlands.

=== Shipbuilding ===
Büsum had an active shipyard which started as a fishing boat repair service in 1902 and was expanded to build increasingly larger ships over the decades. During World War II, the shipyard in Büsum manufactured submarine parts. It finally closed in 1986, rendered unprofitable by overseas competition.

=== Tourism ===
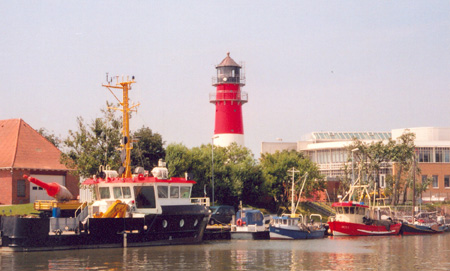
Büsum Lighthouse and harbor

Since 1818, Büsum has been used as a spa town visited for the healing effects of the seawater and the mudflats of the Wadden Sea. It gained official Nordseebad (North Sea spa) status in 1837. To accommodate spa guests, Büsum was connected to the railway network by the Heide–Büsum railway in 1883.

During the Nazi regime, Büsum was a destination for Kraft durch Freude ("strength through joy") tourists, a recreational program organized by the NSDAP.

In 1949, Büsum was officially named a Nordseeheilbad (North Sea health spa). Nowadays, Büsum is a popular summer vacation spot for families and day trips from Hamburg. in 2002, Büsum accommodated 658,723 overnight stays by 83,295 guests. Nearly all (99.5%) of Büsum's tourists are Germans.

One of the landmarks of the town is Büsum Lighthouse. Built in 1912/13 from 55 tons of cast iron plates, it was originally painted black until it received its characteristic red and white daymark in 1952. It has been operated automatically since 1976 and is managed by the Water and Shipping Authority Tönning. From the harbor of Büsum, tourists can take trips to sea, either for pleasure or fishing, as nature trips along the Wadden Sea National Parks, or to the island Helgoland.

=== Energy ===
Büsum is the end point of the NordLink sea cable which transmits up to 1400 MW between Norway and Germany. The line continues with 54 km (34 mi.) of underground cables to the transformers in Wilster.

== Population ==
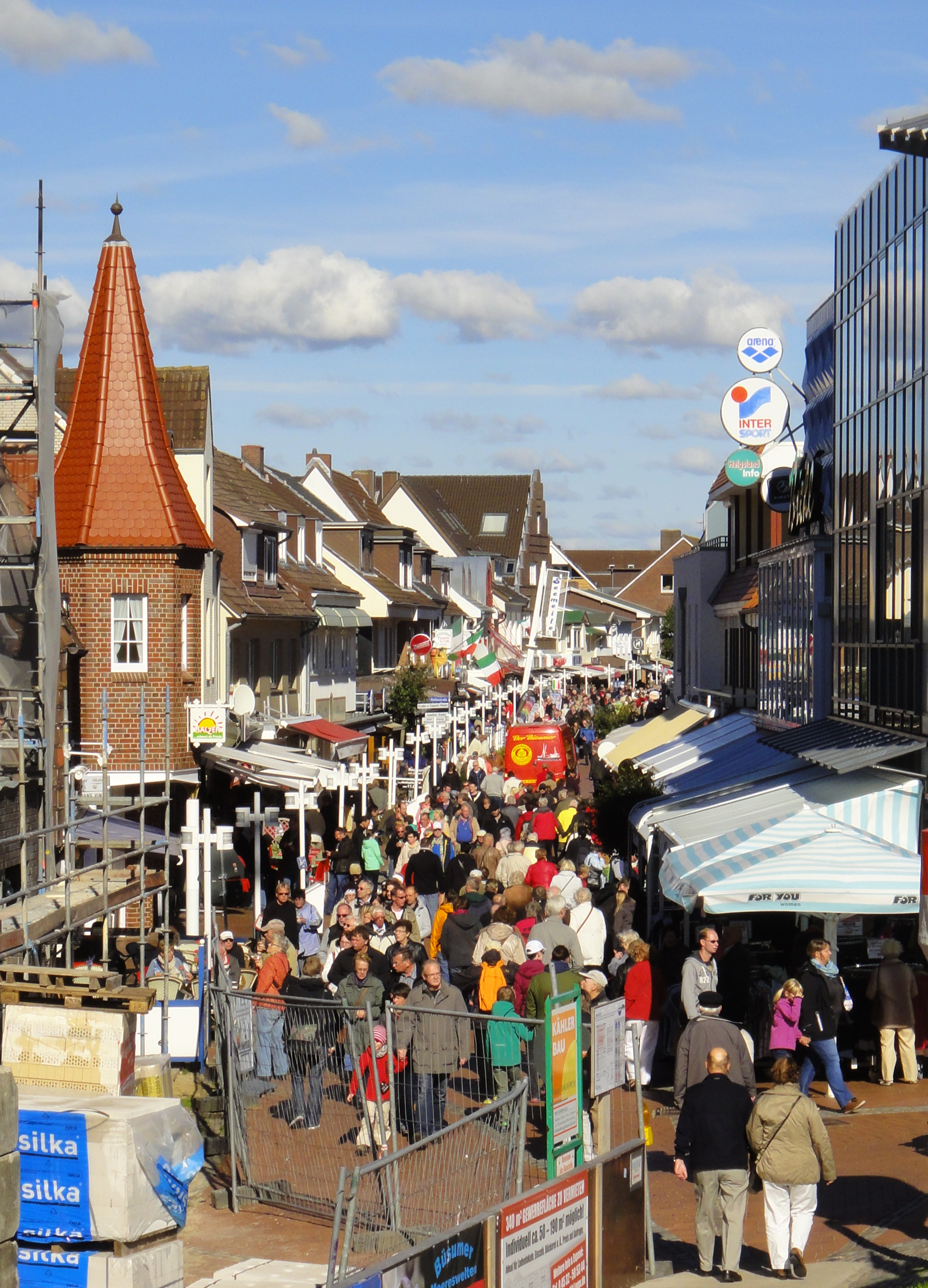
Büsum High Street

Until the 20th century, Dithmarschen had been a rather secluded spot on the map with little influx from the outside world. This changed drastically during World War II, when it became home to evacuees from Hamburg and other bombed cities in Schleswig-Holstein as well as war refugees from the east. The constant stream of newcomers nearly doubled the population, with many of the refugees living in barracks for years. It took nearly a decade before life in Büsum and other towns returned to normal.

In the 1970s and 1980s, Büsum received an influx of foreign workers, mainly from Turkey, to work at the local shipyard until it closed in 1986. In the summer months, the inhabitants of Büsum are vastly outnumbered by tourists staying in the town for a few days or a few weeks.

== Language ==
The traditional language spoken in Büsum is Dithmarscher Platt, a variant of Low German. The old dialect is still in use, especially among the fishermen and the older generation of longtime residents. Commonly used phrases include: "Moin, moin!" ("Hello!") and "Kiek mol wedder in!" ("Komm mal wieder vorbei!")

Dithmarscher Platt was also the language used by the poet Klaus Groth in his poem Ol Büsum (Old Büsum) published in 1853 in the book Quickborn. The dark and melancholic poem describes the flood that claimed the old island and how sometimes at low tide the rooftops of the old settlement could still be seen and the bells from the tower of the sunken church could be heard.

== Religion ==
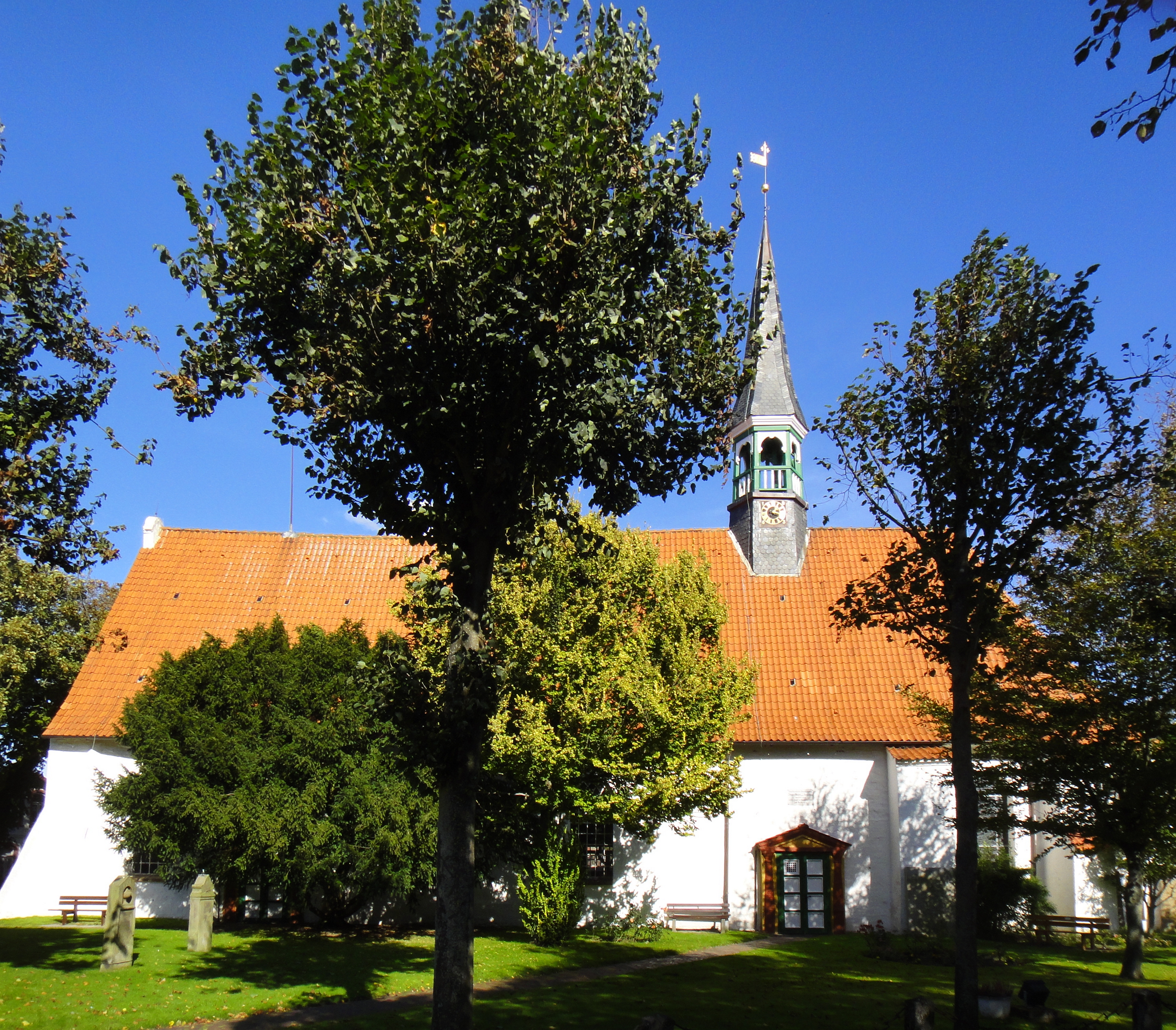
The St. Clemens church in Büsum

Büsum originally was part of the Catholic bishopric of Hamburg and Bremen, but turned to Protestantism during the reformation in Dithmarschen in the Middle Ages.

Büsum's late gothic St. Clemens church, named for Pope Clement I as the patron saint of fishermen, was built between 1434 and 1442. As a relict of Büsum's past as a pirate nest, the St. Clemens church houses a baptismal font and other items raided from the island Pellworm by the pirate Cord Widderich and presented as a consecration gift to the church in Büsum. A carved portrait of Martin Luther from 1564 marks the switch from Catholicism to Protestantism during the late Middle Ages. The altar and lectern date from the early 18th century. Static weaknesses led to a partial loss of the gothic ceiling in 1782, which was replaced by a wooden ceiling.

Until the 19th century, Dithmarschen was almost exclusively Lutheran, but since then a Catholic minority has established itself. Since 1982, the bishopric of Hamburg is represented in Büsum again with the newly built St. Andreas church.

== Education and research ==
Büsum has two schools: The Neocorus-Schule combines elementary and middle school, whereas the Nordsee-Gymnasium serves as high school for Büsum and the neighboring towns of Wöhrden and Wesselburen.

In 1988, Kiel University established the Forschungs- und Technologiezentrum Westküste (Research and Technology Center West Coast) in Büsum. The center focuses on research in the areas of wind energy, marine ecology, algae biotechnology, water and sediment dynamics, changes in coastal morphology and development of prediction models. The results of such research are used primarily to improve coastal management.

Büsum is also seat of a park ranger station and museum of the Wadden Sea National Parks offering guided tours and information on nature conservation efforts. The Museum am Meer at the harbor offers insights into Büsum's past and present history in fishing and tourism.

== Events ==
During the first weekend in August, Büsum's fishermen race their boats in the annual Kutterregatta to determine the fastest fishing vessel. The first regatta was held in 1894. It is traditionally the highlight of summer events in Büsum.

Another summer tradition in Büsum are Wattenlaufen mit Musik and Wattenpolonaise. It was first practiced in 1900 when spa guest Julius Scholz recognized the healing effects of mudflat hiking. To combine treatment with entertainment, spa guests can accompany a band marching out on the Wadden Sea to the water line during low tide, stopping at regular intervals for dancing and games.

== Partner towns ==
- Camaret-sur-Mer, France (since Sept. 25, 1967)
- Kühlungsborn, Mecklenburg-Vorpommern, Germany (since Feb. 6, 1991)

== Bibliography ==
- Neocorus: Chronik von Dithmarschen, published by Dahlmann, Kiel, 1827, and Schuster, 1978 (Find in a library)
- Kurt Schulte: Büsum, Von der Insel zum Nordseeheilbad, published by Westholsteinischer Verlag Boyens, Heide, 1989 (Find in a library)
- Geschichte Dithmarschens, published by Westholsteinische Verlagsanstalt Boyens, Heide, 2000 (Find in a library)
