= Büsum Lighthouse =

Lighthouse in Schleswig-Holstein, Germany

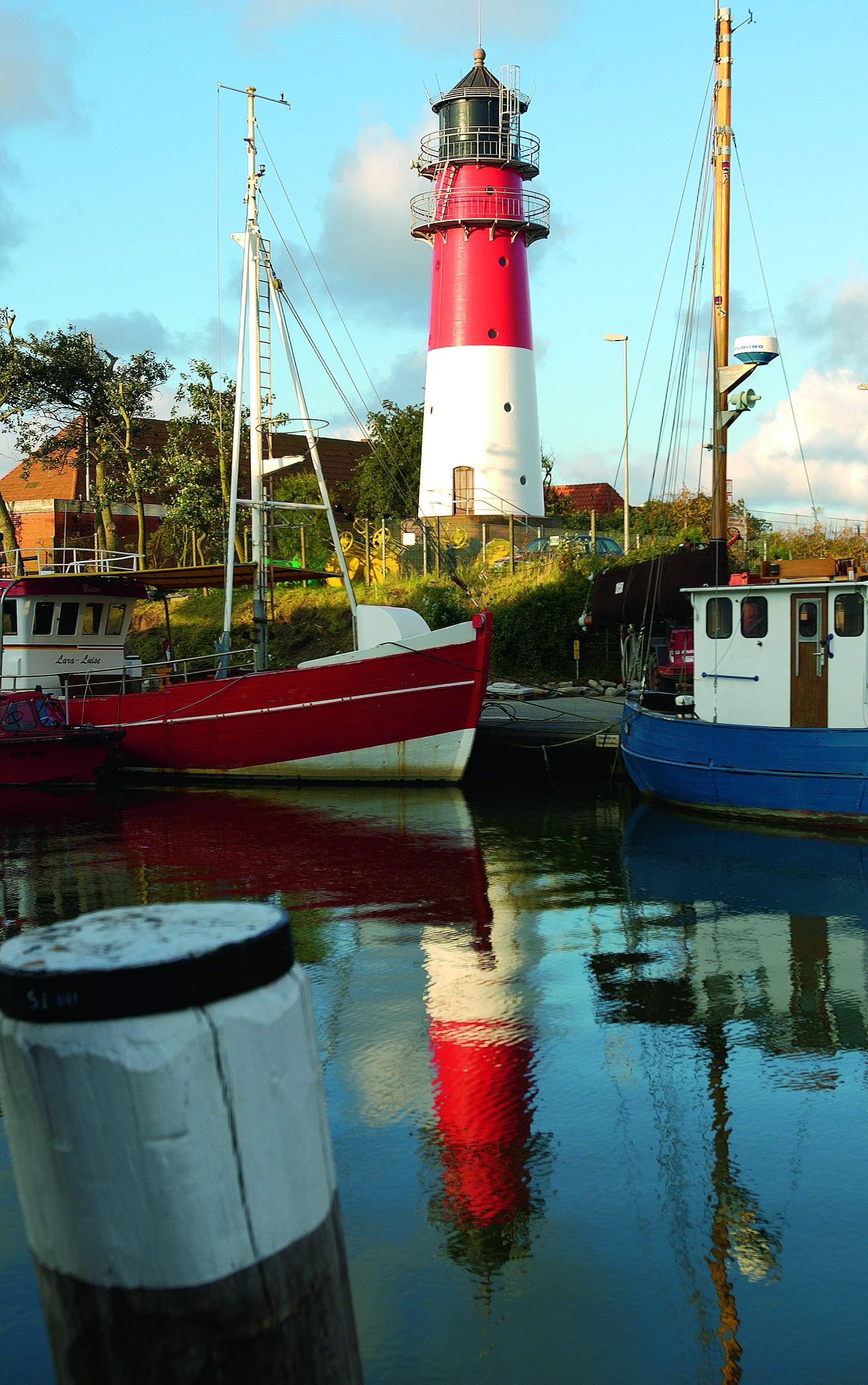
- Location: Büsum, Germany
- Coordinates: 54.12675°N 8.85826°E

Tower
- Constructed: 1912
- Construction: cast iron
- Automated: 1976
- Height: 21.4 metres (70 ft)
- Operator: Wasserstraßen- und Schifffahrtsamt Tönning (1949–2021), Wasserstraßen- und Schifffahrtsamt Elbe-Nordsee (2021–)
- Heritage: Heritage monument in Schleswig-Holstein

Light
- First lit: 1913
- Focal height: 22 metres (72 ft)
- Range: 19 nautical miles (35 km; 22 mi)
- Characteristic: Iso WR 6s

Büsum Lighthouse (German: Leuchtturm Büsum) is an active 20th century lighthouse located in Büsum a fishing and tourist town, which lies on North Sea coast of Schleswig-Holstein, in Germany. The current lighthouse is the second to be built in the town, two other separate breakwater lights mark the entrance of the small harbour from the North Sea.

== History ==
The first lighthouse built in 1878 was simply a lantern mounted on a wooden post, which was fuelled by kerosene. A replica of this early aid to navigation, exists next to the local museum.

The current lighthouse was constructed in 1912 and 1913, and is made up of prefabricated cast iron sections, and is similar in design, although not as tall, as the lighthouses at Westerheversand, Hörnum and Pellworm. Originally painted black, it did not receive its current red and white daymark colour scheme until 1952. The lantern has twin galleries with a roof of sheet copper. The lighthouse at 21.4 metres, is higher than most buildings in the town, and stands 22 metres above mean high tide. It has a nominal range of 19 nautical miles and a light characteristic showing a white, red or green sector, isophase light of three seconds on, then three seconds off.

In 2013, the centenary of the lighthouse was celebrated, when it was depicted on a 58-cent lighthouse stamp series by Deutsche Post the German postal service.

Operated by the Water and Shipping Authority at Tönning, it is registered under the international Admiralty number B1606 and has the NGA identifier of 114-10580.

== Breakwater lights ==
Located on the harbour breakwaters of Büsum are two other lights. On the west mole is a 9-metre high red tower which displays an occulting red light. The east mole has a similar tower, painted green that displays an occulting green light.

== See also ==
- List of lighthouses and lightvessels in Germany
