= Ingeborg Andresen =

German teacher and writer

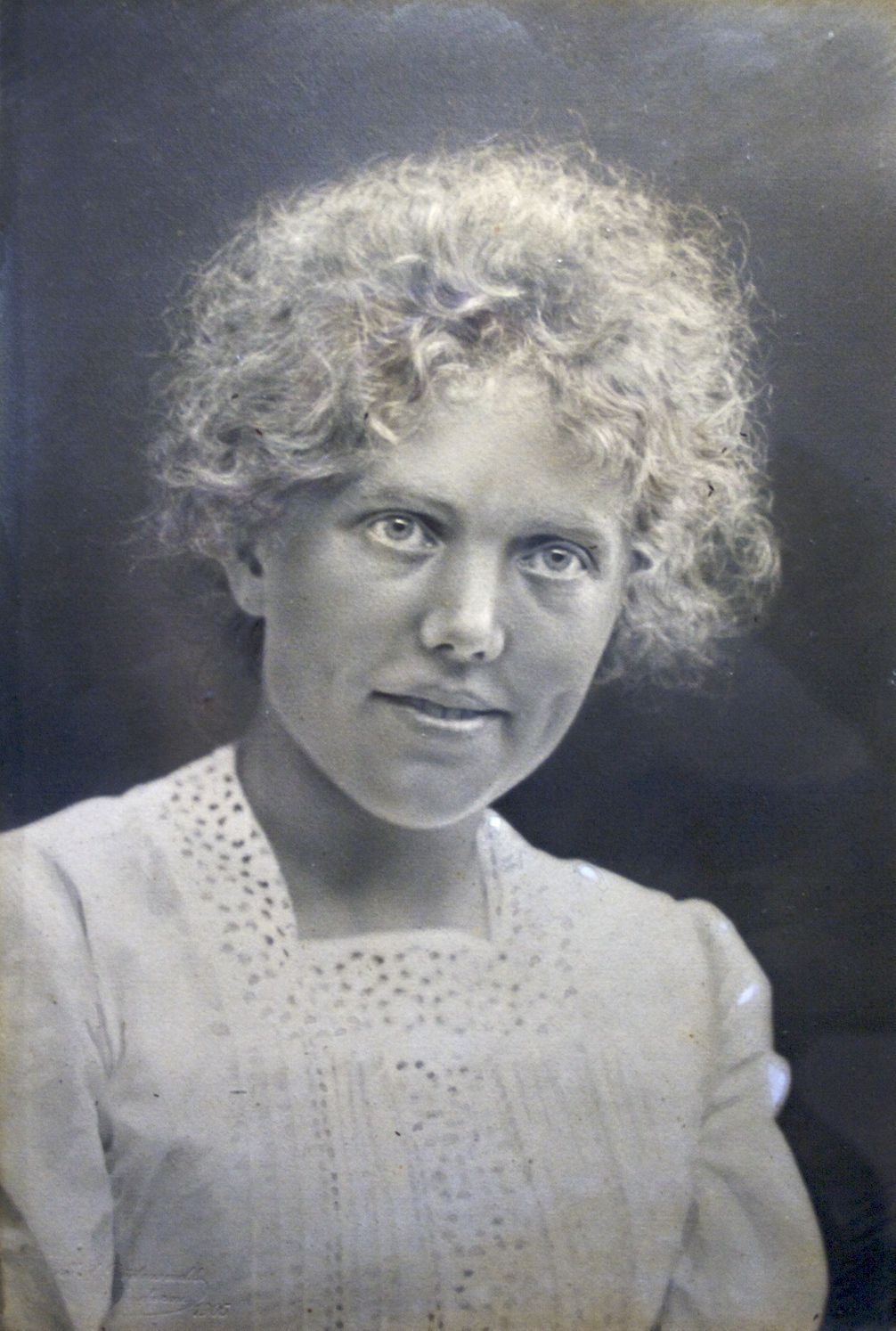
- Photo from the family property, August 1905
- Born: Anne Catherine Ingeborg Andresen; January 30, 1878; Witzwort, North Friesland, Germany
- Died: January 17, 1955 (aged 76); Bremen, Germany
- Occupation(s): teacher and regional writer

Anne Catherine Ingeborg Andresen-Bödewadt (January 30, 1878 – January 17, 1955), known as Ingeborg Andresen, was a German teacher and regional writer from North Friesland.

== Biography ==
After the death of her parents, she and her two brothers went to the worker and poor house, which can be found in the north of Witzwort and has since been converted into an apartment building. She later published the story "Dat groote Hus" about this time. She attended a teacher's college in Schleswig and, as she wrote, "wärr so gau dat man güng Lehrerin". She taught in small villages and later in Hamburg and Kiel.

In 1909 she married the editor of the magazine "Der Schleswig-Holsteiner", Jacob Bödewadt († 1946). Both of them changed their place of residence frequently.

=== Author ===
As a mother of five children, Andresen wrote her extensive works at night under her maiden name. "I was only ever able to work undisturbed as a poet at night." She wrote 30 plays, six novels and over 200 stories, novellas and sketches as well as several radio plays and poems, while during the day she looked after a large household and often represented her husband in the editorial department. The works reflect historical, regional events from North Frisia and personal experiences. Some works show Andresen's involvement in the German-Danish border conflict - from 1921 she lived in North Schleswig, which had belonged to Germany until 1920. She always remained connected to the Low German language and wrote many successful plays in Low German.

She was a member of the Eutiner Dichterkreis, founded in 1936, one of the most important groups of authors in National Socialist Germany. Her book Die Stadt auf der Brücke (1935), which takes place at the time of the Hitler Putsch and which praises National Socialism, was placed on the list of literature to be discarded in the Soviet occupation zone.

In 1936 the family moved to Bremen, where Ingeborg Andresen spent the last 20 years of her life, from 1941 in the house of the Nordic Society.

At the beginning of 1992 her estate came to the Nissenhaus Husum at the Nordfriesland Museum.

== Works ==
- Hinter Deich und Dünen. Geschichten aus Nordfriesland. (Stories from North Friesland) Niebüll 1907 und Anthos Verlag, Witzwort 1987, ISBN 3-9801600-0-9.
- Das Lied der Erde, Stories. Nordmark-Verlag. Tondern 1920/1926.
- De Roop – En Spel vun Welt to Welt, Plattdeutsches Spiel in drei Aufzügen. Nordmark-Verlag. Tondern 1924/1925.
- Groot-Huus. Spel in een Tog. Lutherhaus, Flensburg 1925 (Schleswig-Holsteinische Heimat-Abende; 1).
- Kanten und Kehren. Einakter aus der Vorzeit der Erhebung. Verlag des Schleswig-Holsteiner-Bundes, Kiel 1928.
- Das schöne Leben, Short stories. Martin, Itzehoe 1928.
- De blaue Amidaam, Play in four acts. Nordmark-Verlag, Kiel 1930.
- Die Stadt auf der Brücke. Westermann, Braunschweig u. a. 1935.
- De Froensborg. Radio Bremen, Bremen 1949.
- Nebelland: Tales from North Friesland. Kronacher Verlag Moordeich, Witzwort 1988, ISBN 3-9801600-1-7.
