= Neocorus =

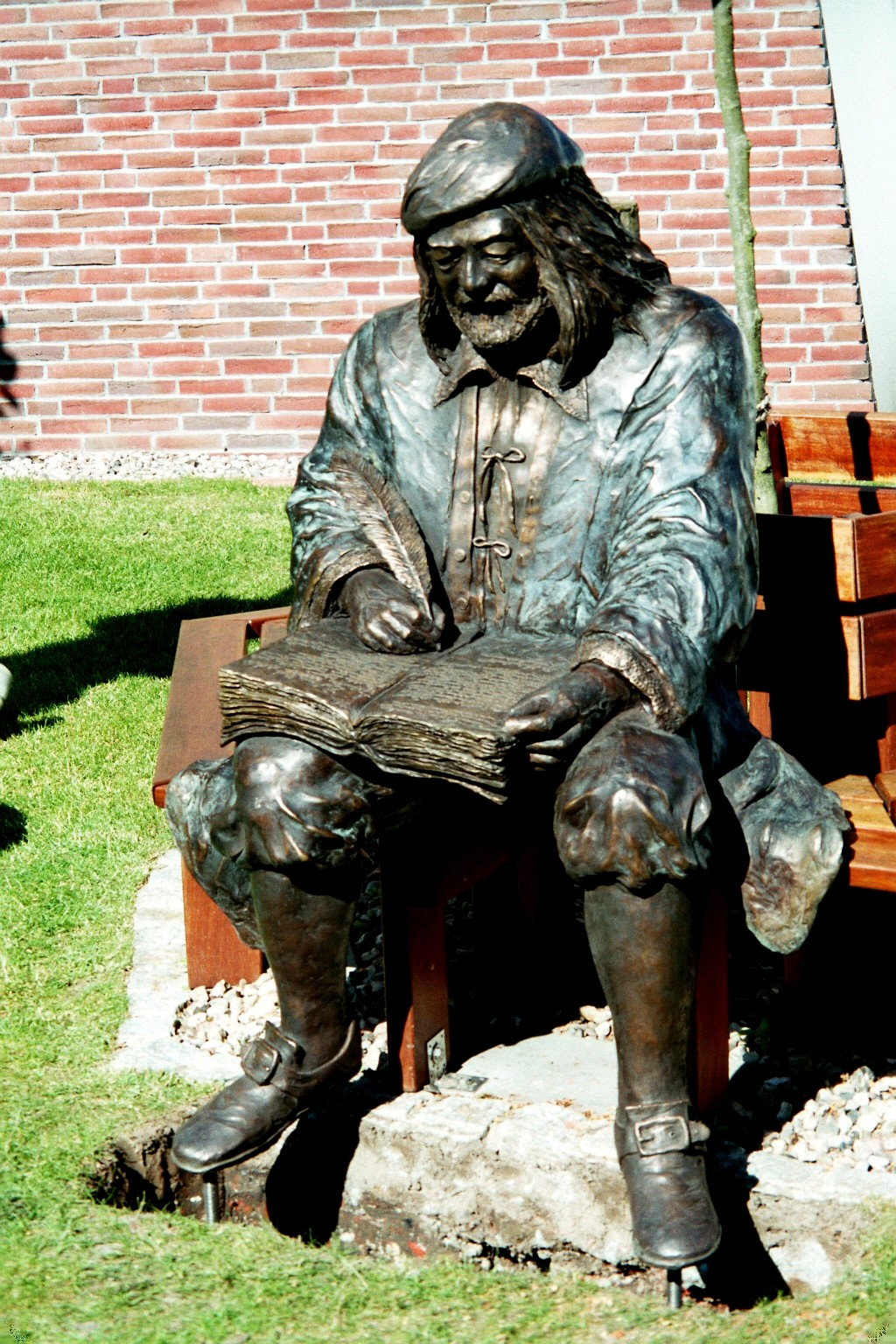
Neocorus statue in Büsum

Johann Adolf Köster (also Johannes Adolph Köster) (c. 1550 – 1630) was a pastor, teacher and historian in Büsum, Germany. He is better known by his Latin name Neocorus, under which he chronicled the medieval history of Dithmarschen. The Neocorus School in Büsum was named in his honor in 1995.

In addition to documenting historic events, Neocorus also wrote accounts of daily life in Dithmarschen during the late 16th century and collected local lore and anecdotes. For example, his chronicles contain a parallel to the story of the forest of Birnam. Michelsen called Neocorus' chronicles the "best and richest of Holstein's chronicles".

Neocorus' Chronik des Landes Dithmarschen was the basis for a 44-minute movie produced in Germany narrating the battle of the people of Dithmarschen for independence from Holstein and Denmark during the late Middle Ages.
