= Nis Albrecht Johannsen the Younger =

Nis Albrecht Johannsen the Younger (born on 11 March 1888 in Deezbüll; died on 15 August 1967 at the same location) was a North Frisian poet.

== Life ==
Albrecht Johannsen was a schoolmaster from Deezbüll near Niebüll in the Bökingharde, and was the son of a writer of the same name and his wife, Johannsen Meta Juliane Lützen (born on 4 March 1856 in Niebüll; died on 31 October 1946 in Flensburg). In the 1920s, he began to engage in North Frisian dictionary work. He also advocated for mother-tongue school instruction in the North Frisian language.

After the Second World War, he also worked for peaceful coexistence in the Danish-German-Frisian border region and later became one of the founding members of the Nordfriisk Instituut.

His estate, comprising roughly 750 written documents, along with that of his father, is now administered by the Nordfriisk Instituut.

The Nis-Albrecht-Johannsen secondary school in Risum-Lindholm was later named after him.

== Works ==
- Üt min Schatull. Friesische Gedichte. Broder Hansen, Bredstedt 1928.
- Beerid: Frasche dächte. Bräist/Bredstedt, NF: Nordfriisk Inst., 1992. ISBN 3-88007-184-5
- Luklik tid. Üülje än naiere bjarnerime än hu dächte deertu. Bräist/Bredstedt, NF: Nordfriisk Inst., 2003. ISBN 3-88007-309-0

== Bibliography ==
- Johannsen, Albrecht (Ps. Nis von ´e Büttendick). In: Kürschners Deutscher Literatur-Kalender, Jg. 47 (1934), Sp. 375f. (Kurzbiografie, auch in: 48. Jg. 1937/38, Sp. 350).
- Thomas Steensen: Der Friese Albrecht Johannsen. In: Nordfriesland, Nr. 81 (März 1988), S. 10–14, ISSN 0029-1196.
- Hans Lassen: Johannsen, Albrecht. In: Olaf Klose, Eva Rudolph (Hrsg.): Schleswig-Holsteinisches Biographisches Lexikon. Bd. 4. Karl Wachholtz Verlag, Neumünster 1976, S. 125f.
- Thomas Steensen: Nordfriesland. Menschen von A–Z. Husum Druck- und Verlagsgesellschaft, Husum 2020, ISBN 978-3-96717-027-6, S. 217f.
