= Nis Albrecht Johannsen the Elder =

North Frisian poet (1855–1935)

- Born: May 11, 1855; Klockries, Kingdom of Denmark
- Died: February 7, 1935 (aged 79); Flensburg, Nazi Germany
- Occupation: Teacher
- Known for: North Frisian poetry

Nis Albrecht Johannsen the Elder (11 March 1855 – 7 February 1935) was a North Frisian poet. He is considered the most important poet of the North Frisian language.

== Biography ==
Johannsen was the son of the tailor Momme Johannsen (1790–1866) and his wife Sösche, née Carstensen, (1819–1895). After attending elementary school in Klockries and the secondary school in Trollebüll, he studied at the teacher training college in Tondern from 1876 to 1879. He then worked as a teacher in Westerschnatebüll and Klixbüll, and from 1885 onward in Deezbüll, where he also served as sexton.

In 1904, Johannsen retired for health reasons and moved to Flensburg. There, he wrote numerous poems, stories, and other works in the North Frisian language, using the Bökingharde dialect, as well as cultural and historical articles in High German. Johannsen regarded the preservation of the Frisian language as his most important mission.

His estate and that of his son are now managed by the Nordfriisk Instituut.

== Works ==
- Üt Mjarsch en Maure. Friesische Erzählungen und Gedichte. C. F. Delff, Husum 1930.
