= Gildemeister =

Gildemeister is a German surname. Notable people with the surname include:

- Alfred Gildemeister (1875–1928), German politician
- Eberhard Gildemeister (1897–1978), German architect
- Fritz Gildemeister (born 1949), Chilean-American tennis player, brother of Hans and Heinz
- Hans Gildemeister (born 1956), Chilean tennis player, brother of Fritz and Heinz
- Heinz Gildemeister (born 1960), Chilean-Peruvian tennis player, brother of Fritz and Hans
- Johann Gildemeister (1812–1890), German Orientalist
- Karl Gildemeister (1820–1869), German architect
- Laura Gildemeister (born 1964), Peruvian tennis player, ex-wife of Heinz
- Otto Gildemeister (1823–1902), German journalist and translator
- Rita Gildemeister (born 1947), German athlete

== See also ==
- Gildemeister AG
