= Pellworm =

Pellworm Pelvorm / Polweerm
- Municipality
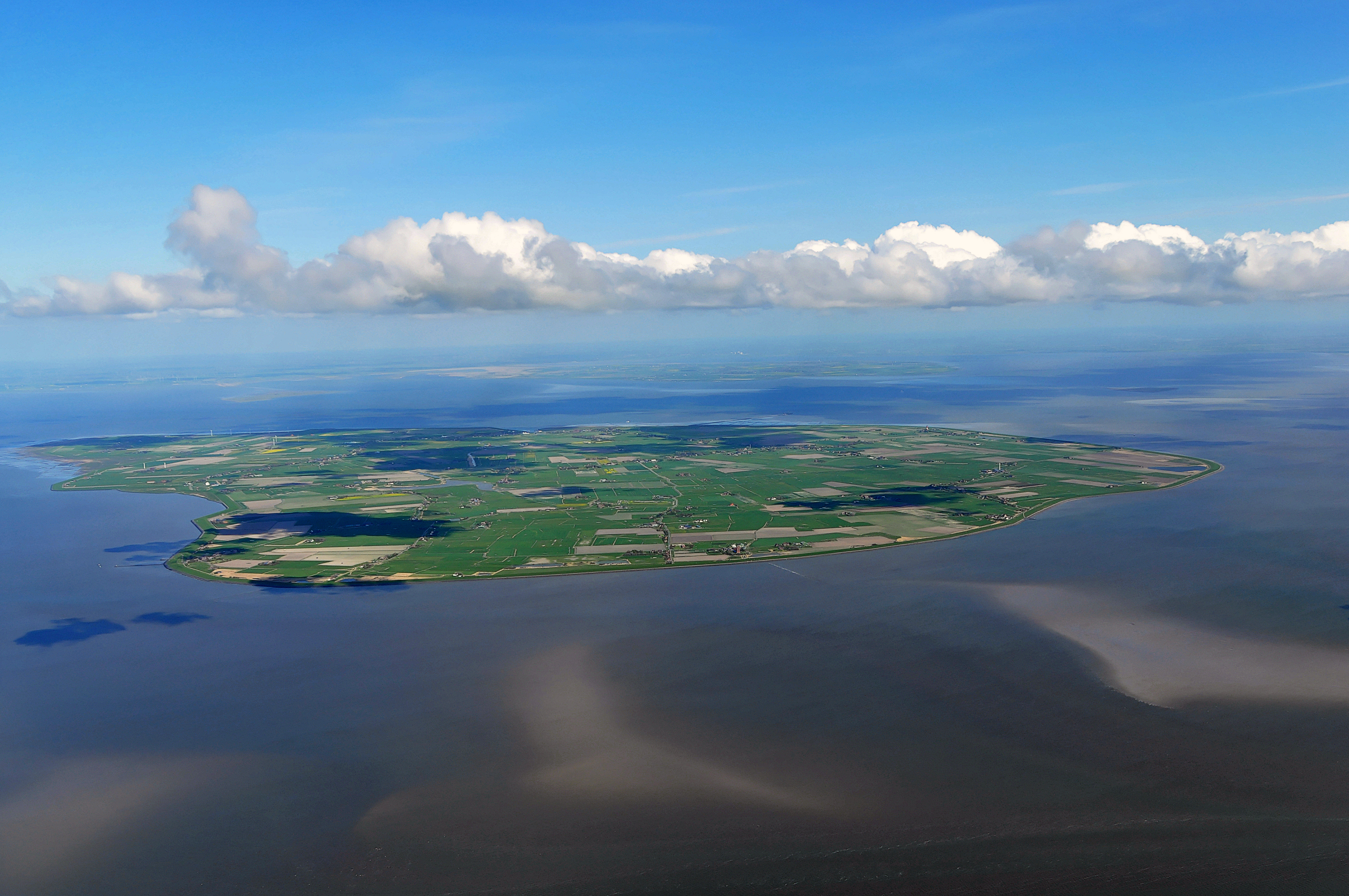
- Aerial view

- Coat of arms

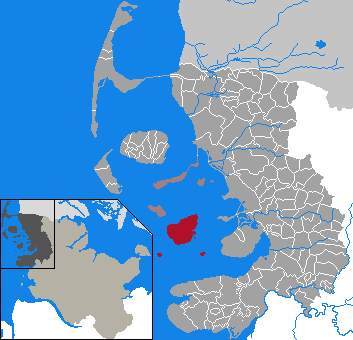
- Location of Pellworm; Pelvorm / Polweerm within Nordfriesland district
- Interactive map of Pellworm; Pelvorm / Polweerm
- Location within Germany Location within Schleswig-Holstein
- Coordinates: 54°31′0″N 8°38′13″E
- Country: Germany
- State: Schleswig-Holstein
- District: Nordfriesland
- Municipal assoc.: Pellworm

Government
  - Mayor: Jürgen Feddersen (CDU)

Area
  - Total: 37.44 km^{2} (14.46 sq mi)
- Elevation: 2 m (6.6 ft)

Population (2025-12-31)
  - Total: 1,156
  - Density: 30.88/km^{2} (79.97/sq mi)
- Time zone: UTC+01:00 (CET)
  - Summer (DST): UTC+02:00 (CEST)
- Postal codes: 25846–25849
- Dialling codes: 04844
- Vehicle registration: NF
- Website: www.pellworm.net

Pellworm (German pronunciation: [pɛlˈvɔʁm]; Danish: Pelvorm; North Frisian Polweerm) is a municipality in the district of Nordfriesland, in Schleswig-Holstein, Germany.

== Geography ==
The municipality is located on the island of Pellworm – one of the North Frisian Islands on the North Sea coast of Germany. Its area is 37 km^{2}, and its population is roughly 1,200. Together with several smaller islands, Pellworm forms the Amt of Pellworm. In medieval times Pellworm was a part of the larger island of Strand which was torn into pieces in the disastrous Burchardi flood in 1634. Other remnants of Strand are Nordstrand and the Halligen. All these belonged to the historical region of Uthlande.

Pellworm is accessible by a ferry departing from the neighbouring peninsula of Nordstrand several times a day (which is in turn connected with the mainland by a road causeway).

== Sights ==
A landmark is the Old Church (German: Alte Kirche) with its Arp Schnitger organ from about 1710. Next to this church is the ruin of its 13th-century steeple. The 58 m-tall (190 ft) tower collapsed partially in 1611. The 30 m-tall (98 ft) ruin has been conserved, so that it is safe for further decay. Locals often call the tower Finger Gottes, God's Finger. The tower is depicted in the coat of arms of Pellworm. The nave of the church houses an organ dating from 1711, an altar which was carved around 1460 and a baptismal font from 1475. The apse and the choir were built in the typical romanesque style. The Cemetery of the Unknown Stateless, founded in 1895, is located near the church. It is the resting place of unidentified individuals whose bodies were found on the coast of Pellworm.

The Neue Kirche (New Church) was built in 1620 and renovated in 1867 and 1998. The altar dates from 1520 and the pulpit was created around 1600.

Nordermühle is a windmill dating from 1777 which was in operation until 1967.

In Tammensiel, the biggest settlement of Pellworm, the Museum of Navigation and the National Park House can be visited.

Several sightworthy Frisian houses with thatched roofs and pointed gables are preserved on the island.

The Momme-Nissen-Haus is a former farmhouse that has been converted into a small cultural center. It also houses a small Catholic chapel, founded in 1978, featuring impressive stained-glass windows that depict the history of the island.

== Energy ==
The island hosts one of the largest hybrid renewable energy plants in Europe. It combines 2.7 MW solar panels; 5.7 MW wind energy and 0.5 MW of biogas digestion plant with to provide over 700 MWh/year of electricity. Since the island's average electricity production capacity exceeds its average demand multiple times, yet there is a time mismatch between the two, this site was chosen for EU's largest stationary energy storage facility ca. 2015. In 2022 the island hosts a 560 kW/560 kWh lithium-ion battery, a 200 kW/1600 kWh vanadium flow battery, and a thermal storage unit. Gildemeister, now Cellcube part of Enerox, supplied the vanadium battery.

== Gallery ==
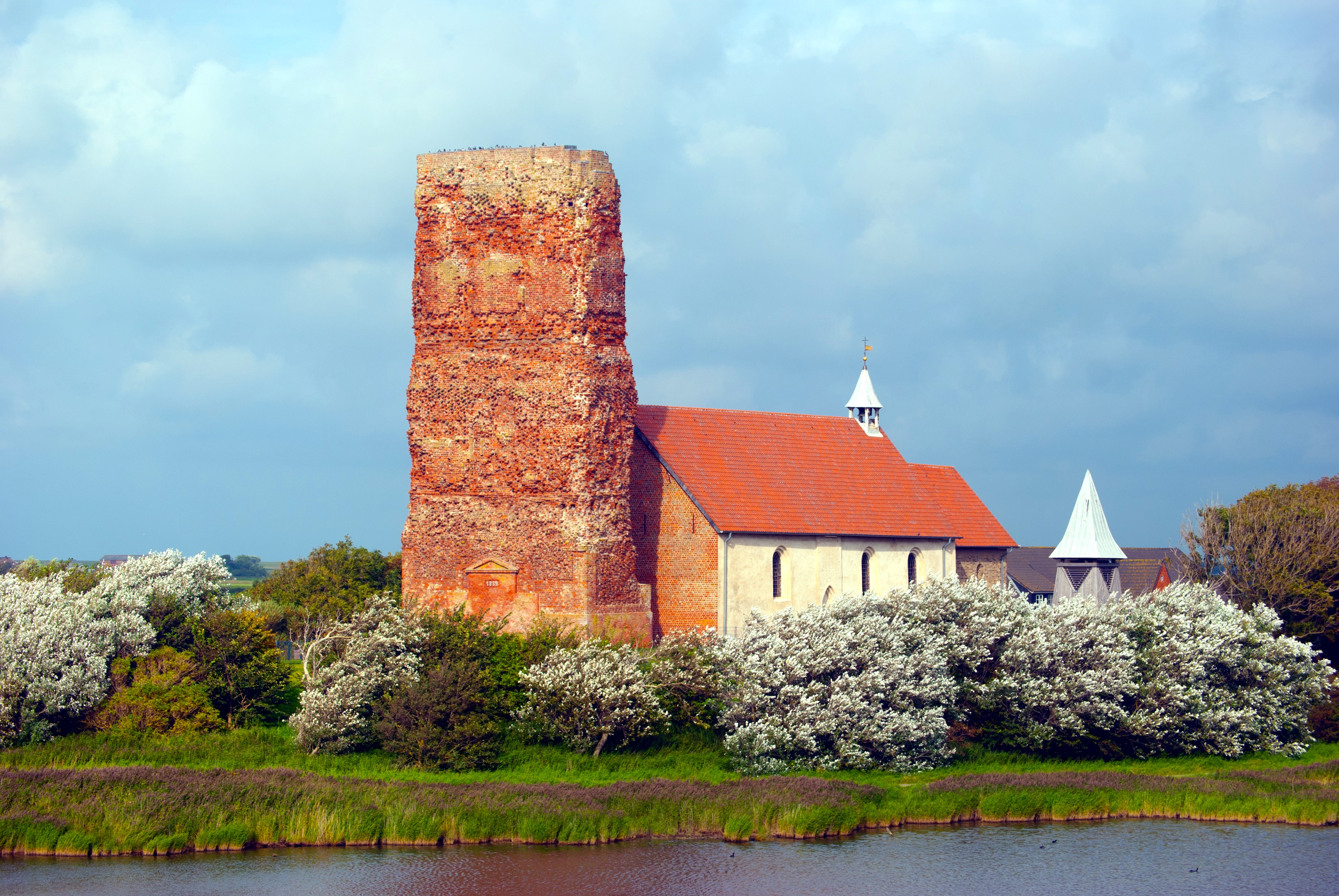
Old Church (Alte Kirche) with the Finger Gottes

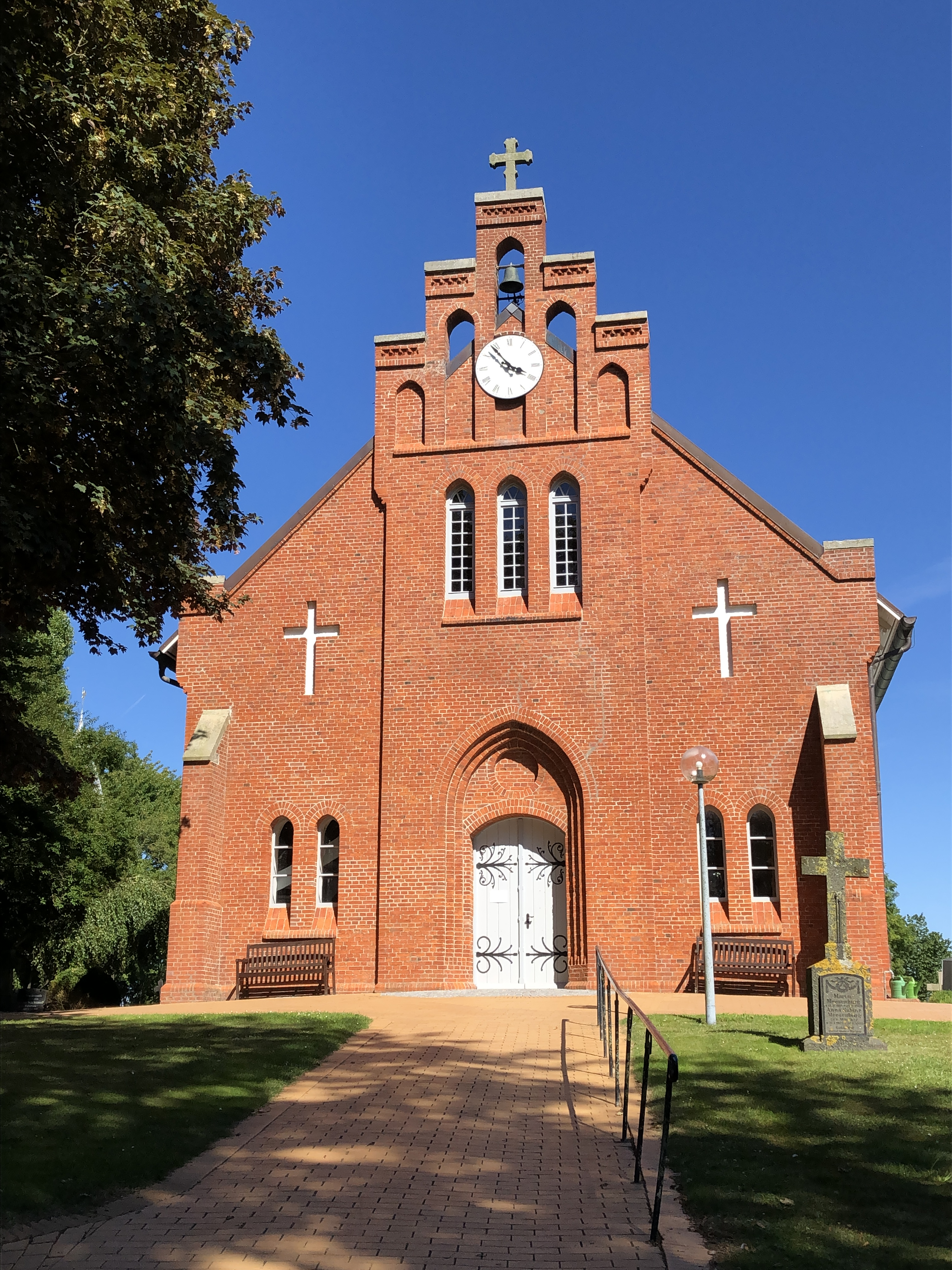
New Church (1620)

Frisian house near the New Church

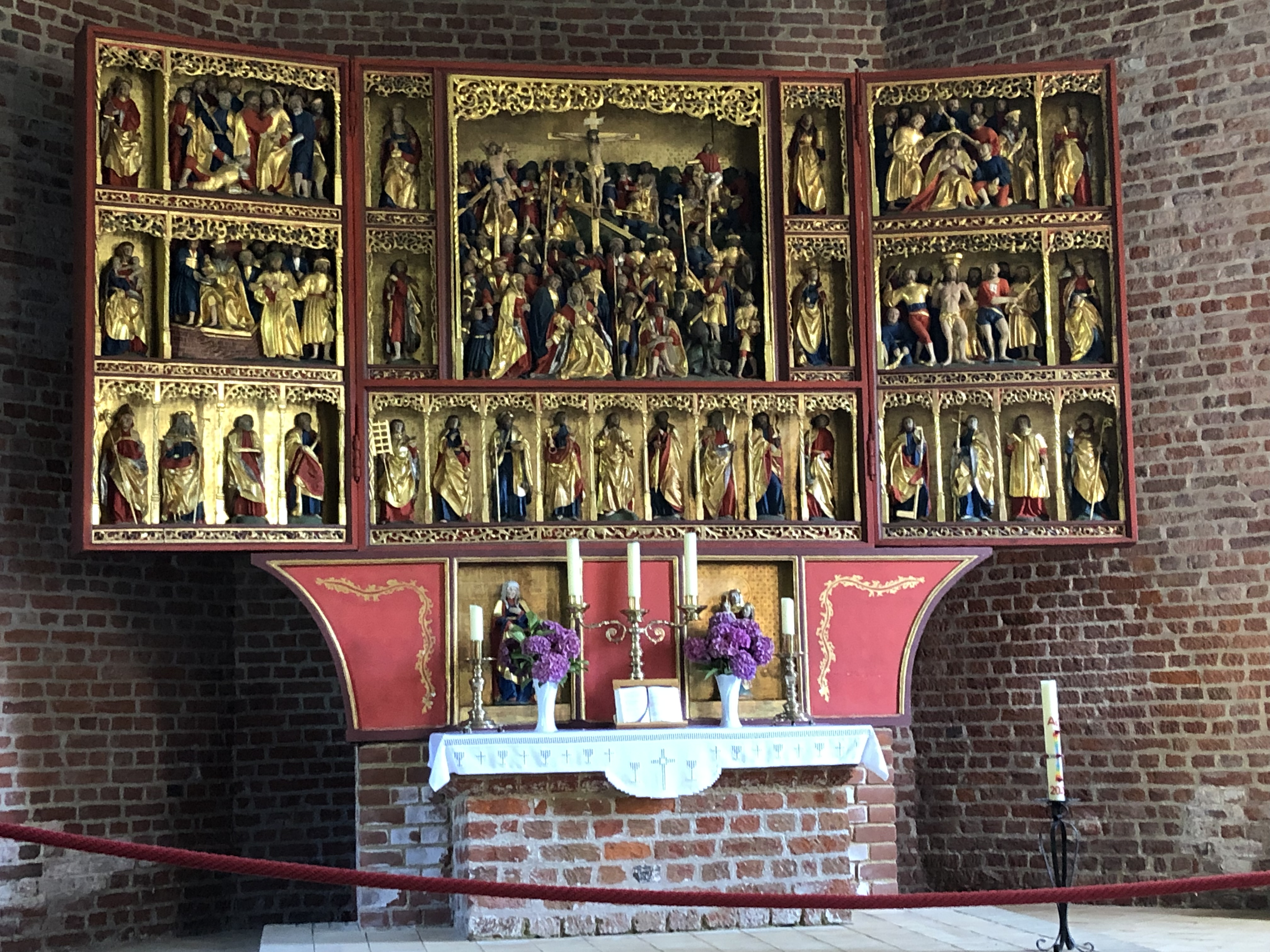
Altarpiece from 1520 in this church

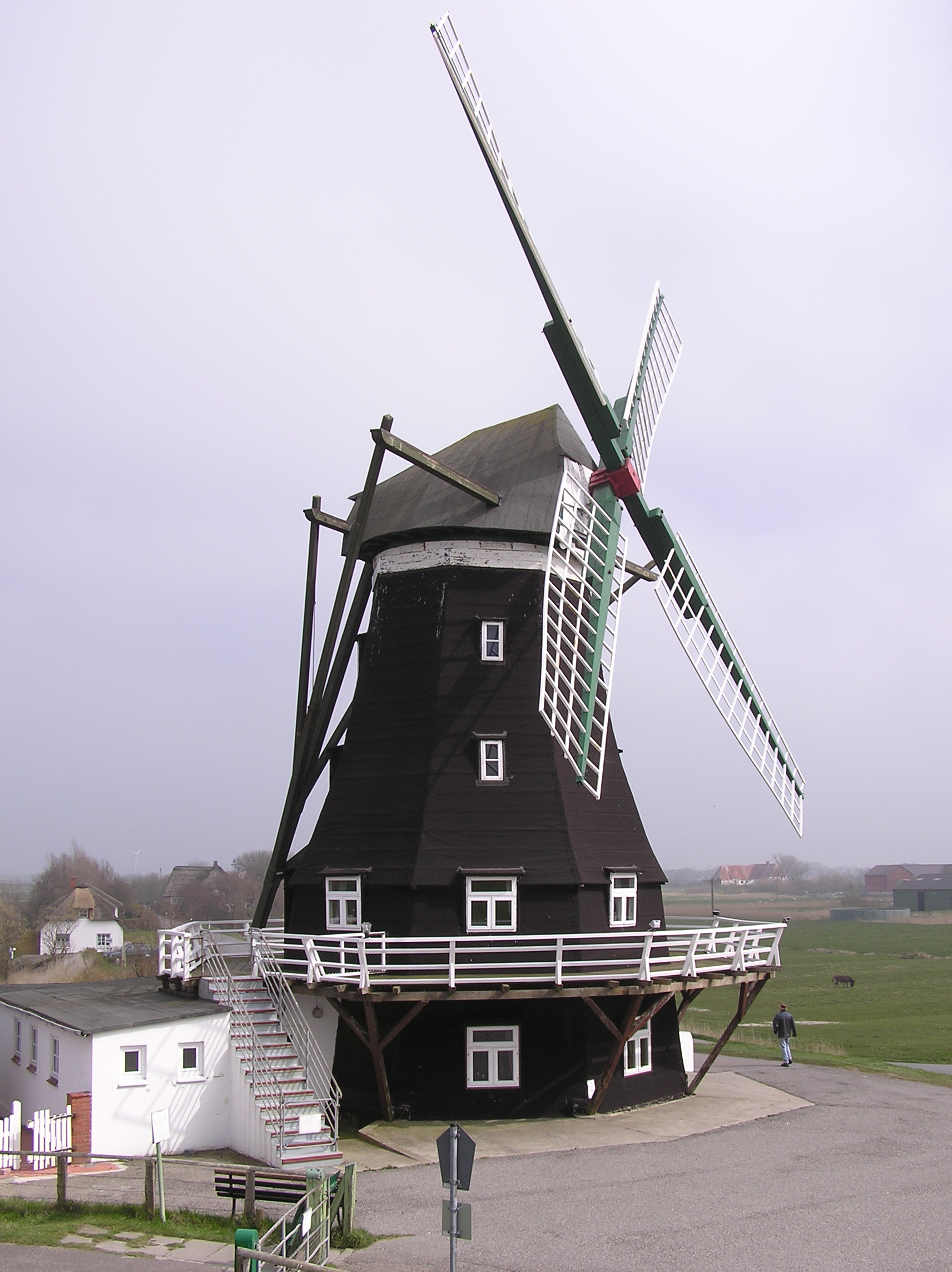
Wind-mill Nordermühle

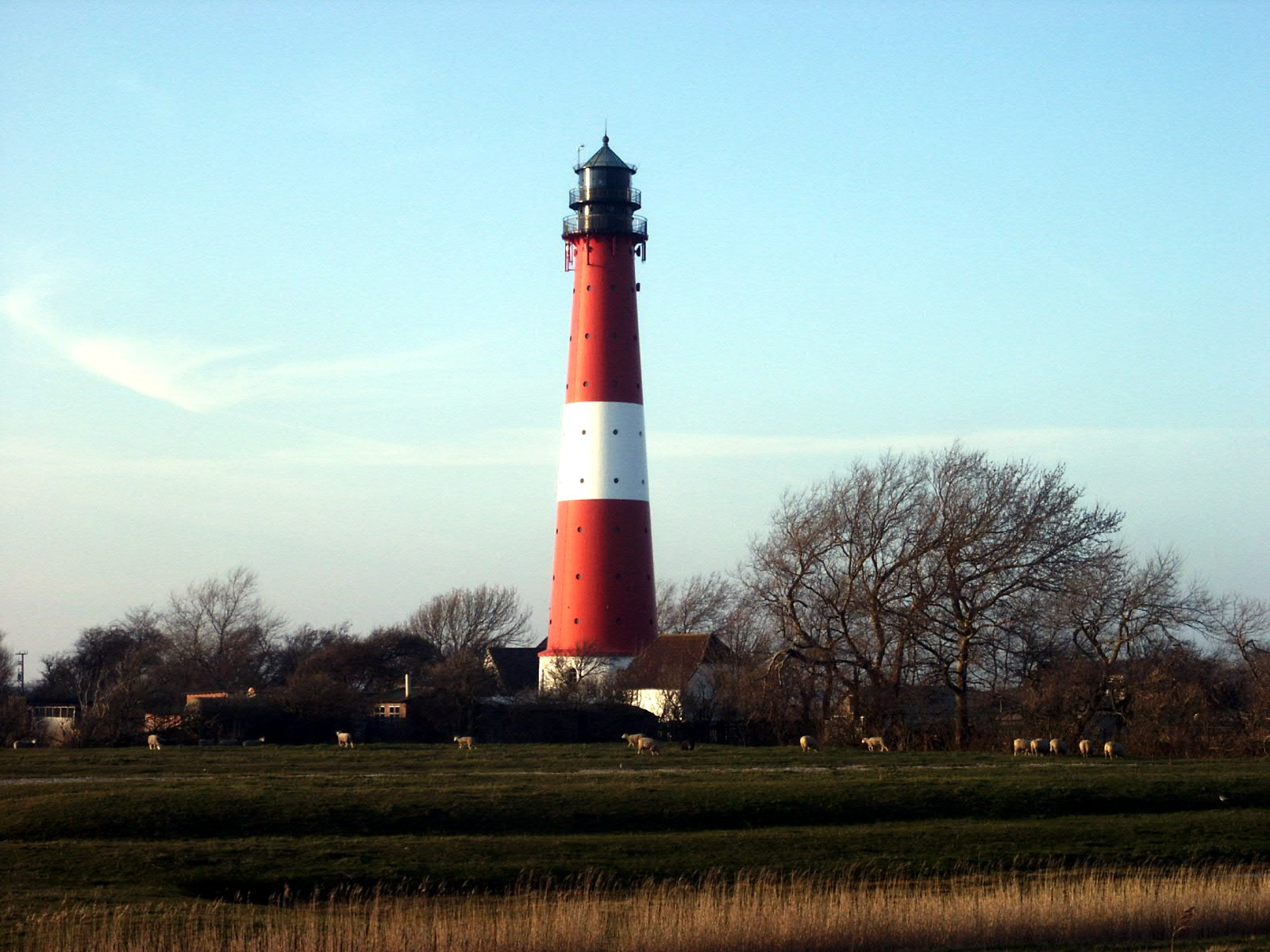
The lighthouse on Pellworm

Museum of Navigation

Main Street, Tammensiel
