= Nordstrand, Germany =

Nordstrand di Ströön
- Municipality
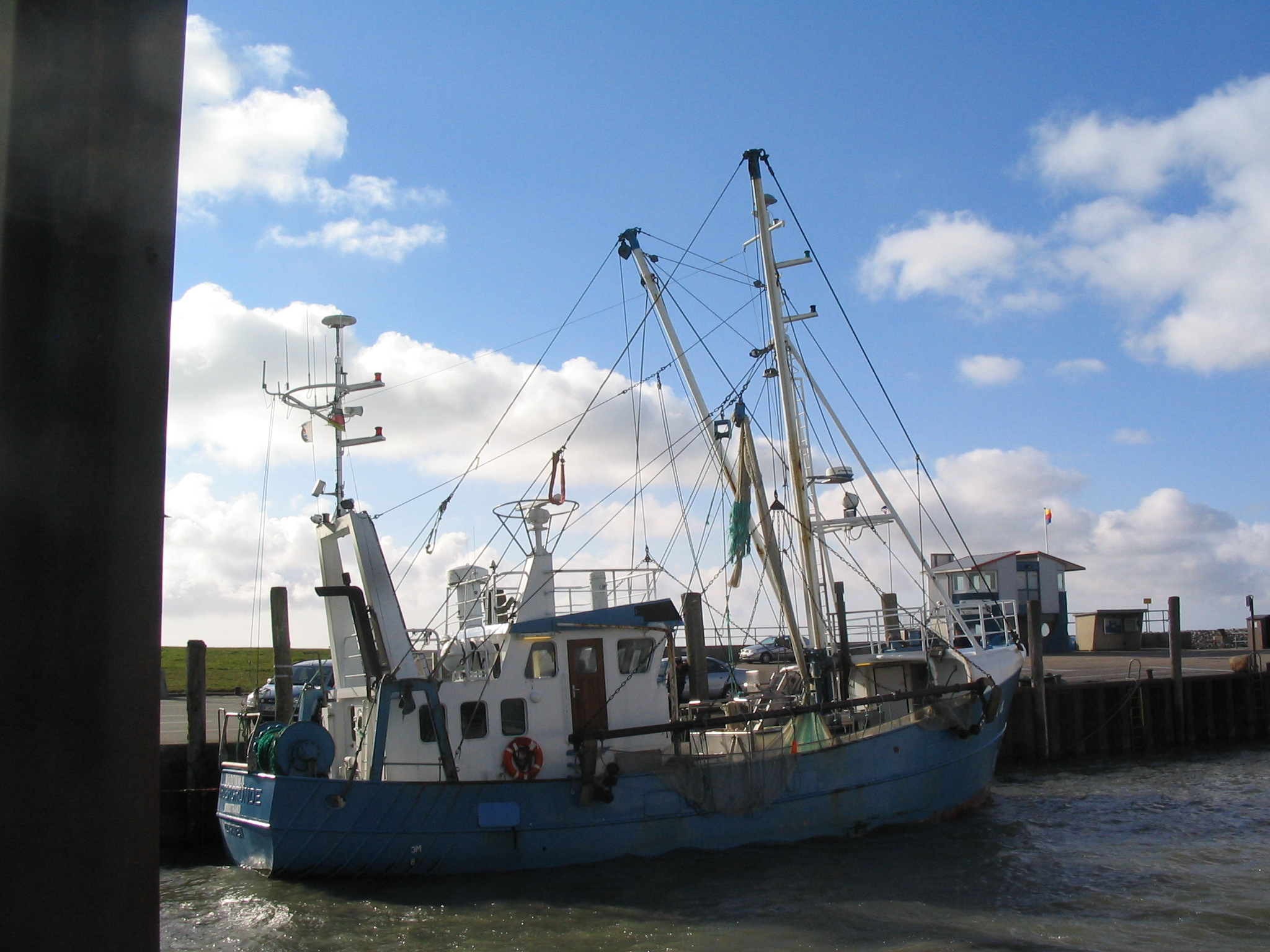

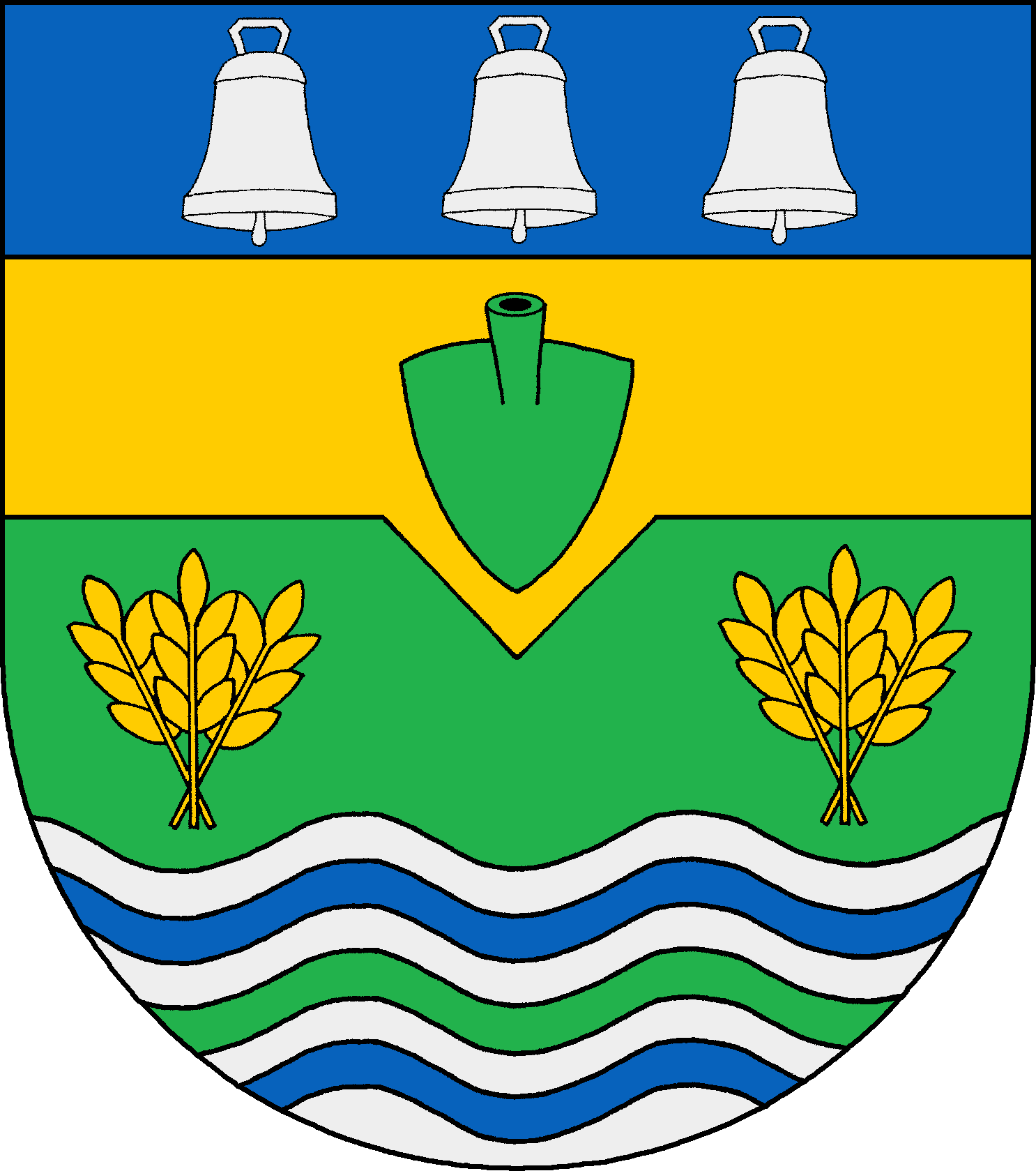
- Coat of arms

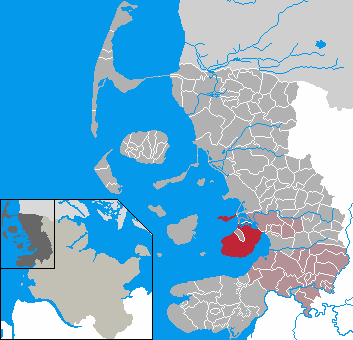
- Location of Nordstrand di Ströön within Nordfriesland district
- Interactive map of Nordstrand di Ströön
- Location within Germany Location within Schleswig-Holstein
- Coordinates: 54°29′N 8°53′E
- Country: Germany
- State: Schleswig-Holstein
- District: Nordfriesland
- Municipal assoc.: Nordsee-Treene

Government
  - Mayor: Ruth Hartwig-Kruse (SPD)

Area
  - Total: 57.43 km^{2} (22.17 sq mi)
- Elevation: 2 m (6.6 ft)

Population (2025-12-31)
  - Total: 2,303
  - Density: 40.10/km^{2} (103.9/sq mi)
- Time zone: UTC+01:00 (CET)
  - Summer (DST): UTC+02:00 (CEST)
- Postal codes: 25845
- Dialling codes: 04842
- Vehicle registration: NF
- Website: www.nordstrand.de

Nordstrand (German pronunciation: [ˈnɔʁtˌʃtʁant]; North Frisian: di Ströön) is a peninsula and former island in North Frisia on the North Sea coast of Germany. It is part of the Nordfriesland district in the federal state of Schleswig-Holstein. Its area is 50 km² and its population is 2,300. Nordstrand has two municipalities, Nordstrand and smaller Elisabeth-Sophien-Koog, which are part of the Amt Nordsee-Treene.

In medieval times Nordstrand was a part of the larger island of Strand, which was torn into pieces in a disastrous storm tide in 1634. More than 6,000 people drowned. Before 1634 the area of the island was about 210 square miles (540 km^{2}). Other remnants of Strand are Pellworm and some Halligen islets. Similar storm surge destruction occurred in 1362 when the town of Rungholt and 28 churches (out of 59 at that time) with the associated villages perished.

Nordstrand is accessible by road over a causeway, which connects to the mainland and was built in 1936. In 1987 the polder Beltringharder Koog was completed, turning the former island into a peninsula.

== Local alcoholic beverage ==
Nordstrand is the origin of a locally famous alcoholic beverage, the Pharisäer (Pharisee), which the islanders developed in 1872 to be able to drink alcohol in the presence of local pastor Georg Bleyer, who preached abstinence. It is made from hot strong coffee, sugar, dark rum (4 cl of 54% vol.) and whipped cream (to prevent the alcohol from evaporating, so that it could not be smelled). The pastor got the only cup without rum, but one day the cups got mixed up. When he discovered the deceit he exclaimed "Ihr Pharisäer!" ("You Pharisees!", connoting: "hypocrites"). Hence the name.

== North American emigrants who used it as a surname ==
The original Nordstrand island (before the flood of 1634) is thought to be the ancestral homeland of the North American surname van Nostrand (including variants: vanNostrand, vanNordstrandt, vanOstrand). Two brothers emigrated from here to what is now New York in 1637 and 1638 after the flood. One of the three granite panels of the Canadian van Nostrand monument, in York Mill's Cemetery, Toronto (St John's, York Mills, Anglican Church, 19 Don Ridge Dr., North York, Toronto, Ontario), points to Nordstrand Island.

Pieter Karstense van Nortstrant was born about 1605 on the island of Norstrand. Coupled with the name of his father, Carsten or Kersten, and the fact that his children were baptized in the Lutheran Church in Amsterdam, it would seem that a German, Frisian or Danish origin is probable. It is uncertain when Pieter Karstense came to Amsterdam, possibly as a child with his father, though no record of the latter has been found there. The sons of Pieter Pietersen Ostrander (son of Pieter Karstense van Nortstrant) were called Van Norstrande or Van Nostrande, whilst Van Ostrande was used in other baptisms and eventually became the surname Oostrander and then the spelling as it is today, Ostrander.

== People from Nordstrand ==
- Ludwig Ingwer Nommensen (1834–1918), Lutheran missionary to Batak lands, North Sumatra in the Dutch East Indies (today in Indonesia), who translated the New Testament into the native Batak language and was the first Ephorus (bishop) of Batak Christian Protestant Church.
- Peter Harry Carstensen (born 1947), prime minister of the state of Schleswig-Holstein from 2005 until 2012.

== See also ==
- Jan Adriaanszoon Leeghwater, Dutch hydraulic engineer
