= Strand (island) =

Historical island on the west coast of Nordfriesland, Schleswig-Holstein, Germany

Coordinates: 54°32′N 8°47′E

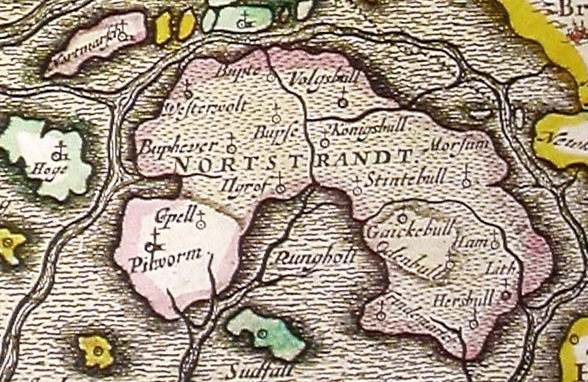
Old Nordstrand (Strand) on a map by Joan Blaeu, 1662. The old shapes of Strand island can still be seen but the majority of the island is marked as submerged.

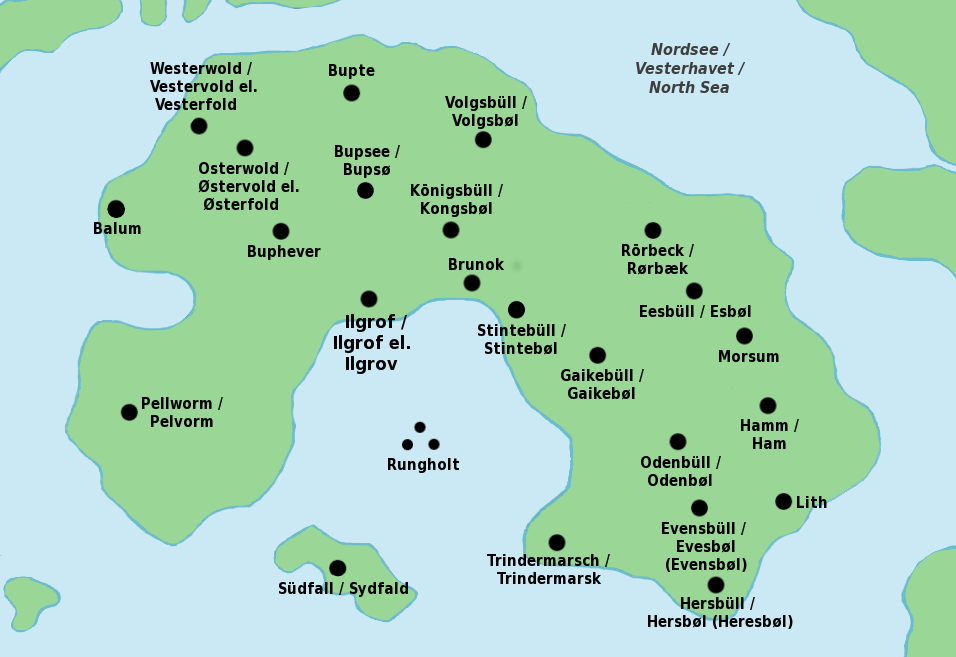
Bilingual map of Strand with German and Danish placenames

Strand (German pronunciation: [ʃtʁant]) was an island on the west coast of Nordfriesland in Schleswig, which was a fiefdom of the Danish crown. The area now belongs to Schleswig-Holstein in northern Germany.

Coastlines along the Dutch-German-Danish coasts were significantly changed during and by a huge storm tide, the Saint Marcellus' flood – also referred to as the Grote Mandrenke – that occurred on 16 January 1362. Many villages and towns were lost. The outlines of Strand changed significantly, nowadays legendary Rungholt reportedly being amongst the now sunken places. The Hallig island of Südfall was then separated from the mainland.

In 1634 the Burchardi flood finally split Strand island into Nordstrand, Pellworm and Nordstrandischmoor.
