= Afitti language =

Nilo-Saharan language spoken in Sudan

Afitti
- Dinik
- Native to: Sudan
- Region: North Kordofan
- Ethnicity: Afitti
- Native speakers: 4,000 (2009)
- Language family: Nilo-Saharan?: Eastern Sudanic; Northern Eastern; Nyima; Afitti

Language codes
- ISO 639-3: aft
- Glottolog: afit1238
- ELP: Afitti
- Afitti is classified as Severely Endangered by the UNESCO Atlas of the World's Languages in Danger.

Afitti (also known as Dinik, Ditti, or Unietti) is a language spoken on the eastern side of Jebel el-Dair, a solitary rock formation in the North Kordofan province of Sudan. Although the term 'Dinik' can be used to designate the language regardless of cultural affiliation, people in the villages of the region readily recognize the terms 'Ditti' and 'Afitti'. There are approximately 4,000 speakers of the Afitti language and its closest linguistic neighbor is the Nyimang language, spoken west of Jebel el-Dair in the Nuba Mountains of the North Kordofan province of Sudan.

== Demographics ==
Afitti is spoken primarily in Kundukur, Shakaro, and Kitra, at the foot of the Jebel ed-Dair and northwest of it; near Jebel Dambeir, Dambeir, and el-Hujeirat (Rilly 2010:182-183). There are about 4,000 speakers of two dialects, Ditti (spoken mainly in Kitra) and Afitti proper (spoken in the rest of the villages). However, the situation is complicated by extensive intermarriage.

== History ==
The Afitti live to the east of Jebel el-Dair. They previously resided at the base of the mountain, but after World War I increasing numbers of cattle and overcrowding drove them down the mountain to the plain where they resettled on farms. As a result of these movements the towns of Kitra in the north, Kundukur in the east, and Sidra towards the south were established. Because of an increase in the number of cattle, a separate group was forced to settle at the foot of Jebel Dambir, further northeastwards. Cattle herders from Sidra settled to the southwest of Dambir and those from Kitra to the northeast. Today, the people of Kitra are known as “Ditti” while the others are known as "Afitti", but the dialects have only minor lexical differences between them.

When a drought struck the country in 1984, the majority of the cattle herders lost their livestock and became farmers; consequently, Afitti and Ditti speakers no longer herd cattle. In the 1950s, when Islam entered the area, the process of conversion began and today all speakers of Afitti are considered Muslim. Arabic has become the main language of communication, especially for the Afitti speakers; the local school also uses Arabic for teaching. The change of occupation for the cattle herders, the modernization in Sidra, and the overall dominance of Arabic have combined to reduce the overall importance of Afitti as well as decreasing speaker proficiency. Loanwords pervade the language, and it is only the Ditti who raise their children until school-going age without the use of Arabic.

== Phonology ==
=== Vowels ===
The table below illustrates the vowels of Afitti; the symbols in parentheses represent prominent allophones of the phoneme beside which they appear.

	Front	Central	Back
High	i (ɪ/ɨ)		u (ʊ)
Mid	e (ɛ)	ə	o (ɔ)
Low		ɑ (a)	

Afitti has six vowels that have an allophonic variation that is mostly predicted by the syllable structure. Vowels are relatively short in Afitti with occasional lengthening occurring in stressed syllables. Furthermore, vowels are shorter in closed syllables than they are in open syllables. In closed syllables, vowels become open and sometimes centralized. The schwa, however, is always short and limited in distribution, never being found in word-final position. It remains short when the syllable is stressed and in such cases the consonant that follows it may be geminated.

Combinations of two vowels are common in Afitti and include combinations where the second vowel is schwa. There are no clear (level) diphthongs and the vowels are given individual tones that can be analyzed as part of different syllables. Sequences of three or more vowels were not found within the confines of one word.

=== Consonants ===
The table below displays the consonants of Afitti; sounds in parentheses are of uncertain phonemic status.

		Labial	Alveolar	Palatal	Velar
Stop	voiceless		t	c	k
Stop	voiced	b	d	ɟ	g
Fricative		f	s		
Nasal		m	n	ɲ	ŋ
Approximant		(w)	l	(j)	
Trill			r		

Afitti has nasals and plosives at four places of articulation: labial, alveolar, palatal, and velar. The plosives have a voicing contrast primarily found in word-initial position. This distinction is mostly lost in intervocalic position with neutralization in favor of the voiced variant. The majority of plosives are voiceless in final position due to a devoicing process affecting other sounds as well.

No words begin with a voiceless bilabial stop and final voiceless stops are often unreleased, but these variants occur in free variation with a released allophone. Alveolar and dental stops also appear in free variation. The dental variant appears with some speakers if they wish to stress the consonant that is being pronounced. Nasals occur in all positions, including as syllabic nasals. They usually assimilate to a following consonant. When a word-initial velar nasal follows a word-final, voiceless velar stop, the stop will be unreleased and voiced. The liquids /l/ and /r/, like the plosives, tend to become devoiced in word-final position. For both /l/ and /r/ their devoiced allophones can be easily mistaken for a fricative because of the heavy airflow. Like the nasals, the liquids have a syllabic variant. The syllabic /r/ is common in the language and is found in monosyllabic words as well as in word-final position. The syllabic /l/, on the other hand, is rare and unattested in word-initial position. As a consonant the central resonant /r/, as opposed to /l/, however, is not found in word- initial position and changes to a retroflex flap intervocalically. Whenever /r/ occurs in word-initial position, it is in words clearly borrowed words from Arabic and other languages. The allophonic flap and /l/ are easily confused but the flap can also be found immediately following a consonant (and preceding a vowel), a position where /l/ is absent, one of the rare cases where a sequence of consonants can be found. The lateral liquid is found in word-initial, intervocalic and word-final position and is slightly palatalized. This palatalization leads to a slightly fricated voiceless palatal release with some speakers when it is in word-final position.

The fricatives /s/ and /f/ are usually voiceless but, in some instances, vary with their voiced counterparts. They occur word initially and intervocalically, but only loanwords possess the fricatives in word-final position. The /s/ is sometimes palatalized (realized as [ʃ]) before the high front vowel /i/.

=== Tone and Stress ===
Afitti is a tone language with stress. Tonal minimal pairs are attested for monosyllabic, bisyllabic, and trisyllabic words. In longer words, however, stress seems to play a more important role. The stressed syllable is marked by a combination of volume, duration and change in tone, rather than just tone alone. Afitti has only two phonemic tones with clear and strong downdrift, with no third tone or even downstep. The shortening of syllables ending in /r/ has led to many words that have an intervocalic flap following a schwa or a syllabic /r/. The schwa is omitted altogether by some speakers reducing the word by one syllable and possibly eliminating a tone. When this reduction occurs, one tone is assimilated to the neighboring tone, keeping the tonal pattern intact.

=== Syllable Structure ===
Afitti has both closed and open syllables. Syllables may be closed with a liquid, a nasal or a stop. Single-segment syllables may consist of a (syllabic) liquid, a (syllabic) nasal, or a vowel. Syllables include combinations of vowel and consonant but there are few consonant clusters. Nasals that precede consonants are always syllabic – there are no nasal-consonant sequences or prenasalized segments. Liquids that follow fricatives or consonants are preceded by a schwa for most speakers, but in many cases are realized (exceptionally) as consonant clusters. There are no tautosyllabic consonants that follow liquids or fricatives and nasals do not follow other consonants. Words usually contain one, two or three syllables, but verbs may contain as many as eight or more.

== Grammar ==
=== Morphology ===
Afitti can tentatively be defined as an agglutinative SOV language with postpositions. Plural marking on adjectives and nouns take the form of a suffix. Plural marking in verbs is found for both objects and subjects. Plural forms of verbs without a verbal plural marker are translated as duals. Afitti has no definite or indefinite articles and gender marking also seems to be absent. All of these characteristics are common both geographically and within the Eastern Sudanic language. However, with the exception of Nyimang, the differentiation between dual and plural is particular to Afitti.

=== Kinship Terms ===
The Afitti kinship terms have specific possessive pronouns and in the case of 'father' and 'mother', there is a separate set of dual forms. This set is also found when speaking, plurally, of 'mothers and 'fathers'. Other kinship terms, namely 'son', 'sibling' and 'mother- in-law', also have a set of dual forms but lose this distinction when speaking, plurally, of 'sons', 'siblings' and 'mothers-in-law'. All other terms, including 'daughter', 'father- in-law', 'husband', 'wife' and '(paternal or maternal) uncle' do not or no longer distinguish dual from plural forms. The dual is mainly formed by way of morpheme or word order. More specifically, in the case of 'father' and 'mother,' the dual seems to be created by inversing the order of possessive pronoun and kinship term.

== Afitti and Meroitic ==
The Afitti language may help scholars to better understand texts in Meroitic, a script whose sounds can be deciphered but whose meanings remain unclear. In the last few years, some linguists have come to the opinion that ancient Meroitic shares a history with a number of languages still spoken today. According to French archaeologist Claude Rilly, Meroitic belongs part of the Nilo-Saharan language group, and has particular affinities with that group's North Eastern Sudanic branch which comprises a handful of languages spoken in Chad, Eritrea, Ethiopia, and Sudan.
