= Wangerooge Frisian =

Extinct East Frisian variety

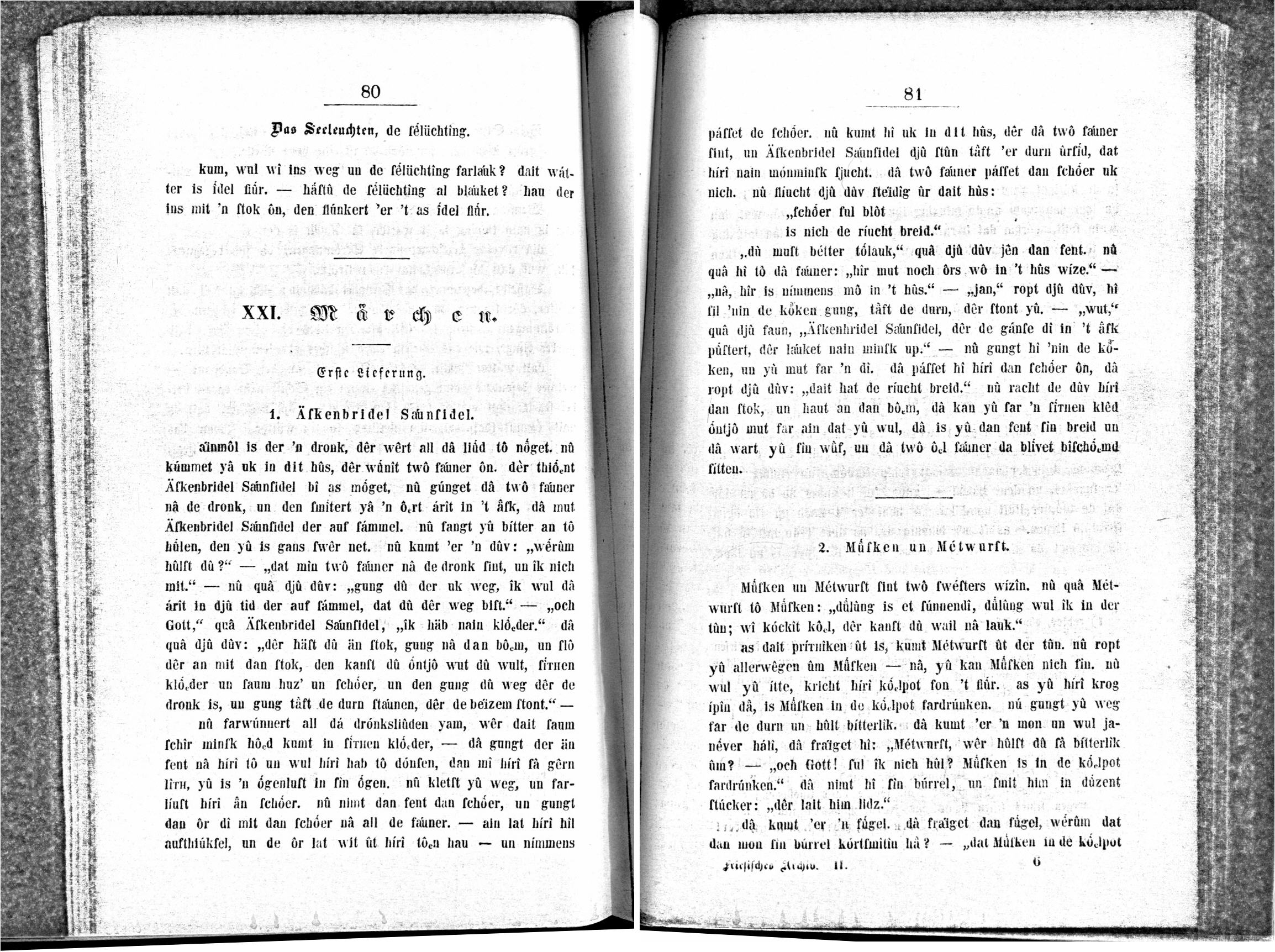
- A text in Wangerooge Frisian from Ehrentraut's 1854 publication
- Region: Wangerooge
- Ethnicity: East Frisians
- Extinct: 1950, with the death of Heinrich Christian Luths and Hayo Hayen
- Language family: Indo-European: Germanic; West Germanic; North Sea Germanic; Anglo-Frisian?; Frisian; East Frisian; Weser; Wangerooge Frisian

Language codes
- ISO 639-3: wgf (rejected in 2022)
- Glottolog: None
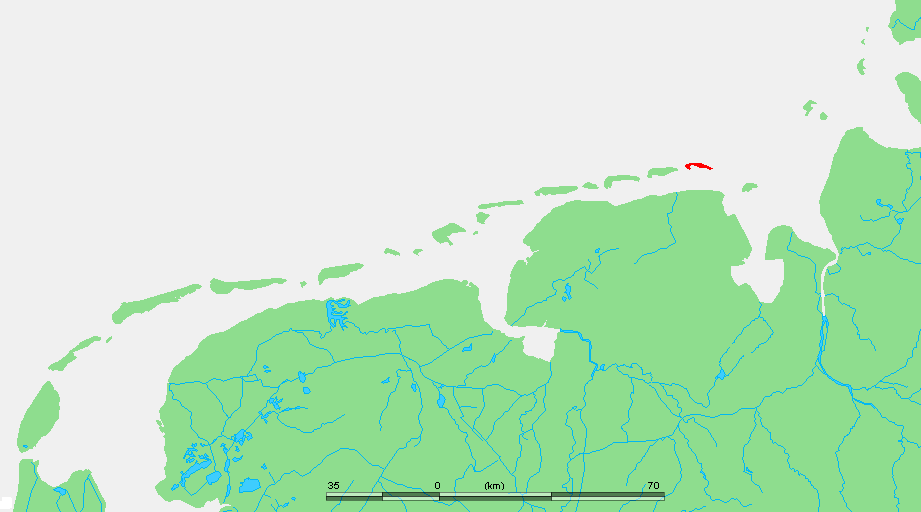
- Wangerooge marked in red in the Wadden Sea

Wangerooge Frisian, also known as Wangeroogic or Wangeroogish, is an extinct variety of the East Frisian language, formerly spoken on the East Frisian Island of Wangerooge. Descended from the Weser subdialect of Old Frisian, it flourished on the island until a massive storm struck during the winter of 1854–1855, causing the inhabitants to flee to the mainland near Varel. Following the rebuilding of the island a few years later under the administration of the city of Oldenburg, Wangerooge was inundated with non-Frisian speakers and the population who had fled the island adopted the languages native to the mainland. The last two speakers died in 1950 in Varel.

Research on the dialect began as early as 1799, but Wangerooge Frisian remains well-attested largely due to the later efforts of Heinrich Georg Ehrentraut, a German jurist, between 1837 and 1841. Along with his main informant Anna Metta Claßen, Ehrentraut analyzed the dialect and compiled an extensive corpus with speakers in the first half of the 1800s, originally published in two volumes of a short-lived academic journal; a third volume was published in 1996 using Ehrentraut's Nachlaß. Modern attention has been paid to Wangerooge Frisian for its preservation of archaic phonological phenomena, its unique phonology among Germanic languages, and its linguistic innovations over time.

== History ==
=== Classification ===
Wangerooge Frisian was a variety of the East Frisian language once spoken on Wangerooge, an island in the Wadden Sea. Whether it is a dialect of the East Frisian language or forms a separate language within a larger East Frisian language family is the subject of scholarly debate. The Dutch Frisian scholar Arjen Versloot has argued that based on the evidence, it is likely that the difference between Wangerooge and Saterland Frisian – the only living East Frisian language – was at least as divergent as the Mainland Scandinavian languages are from one another, "if not more so".

Wangerooge Frisian is descended from the eastern Old Frisian dialect now known as Old Weser Frisian, the language of the Riustring Manuscripts. It is closely related to the other two descendants of Old Weser Frisian, Wursten and Harlingerland Frisian, both of which are also now extinct. Whether the language of the Riustring Manuscripts is the direct ancestor of Wangerooge and Wursten Frisian is debated; Patrick Stiles argues that the language of the manuscripts is extremely close phylogenetically, but not the parent language, whereas Bremmer describes Wangerooge and Wursten Frisian as descendants. Wangerooge Frisian is considered to be among the most conservative forms of the Frisian languages. Compared with several Frisian languages and dialects, as well as English and Scots, Wangerooge Frisian shows the highest percentage of archaic features and is second-highest – nearly tied with Mooring Frisian – in irregular forms, including innovative and conservative irregularities.

=== Documentation ===
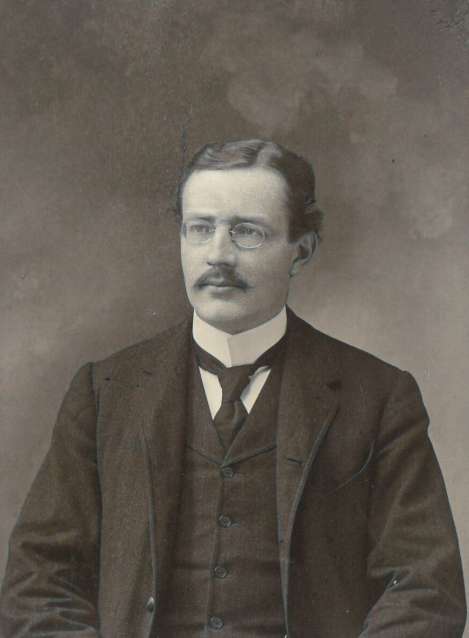
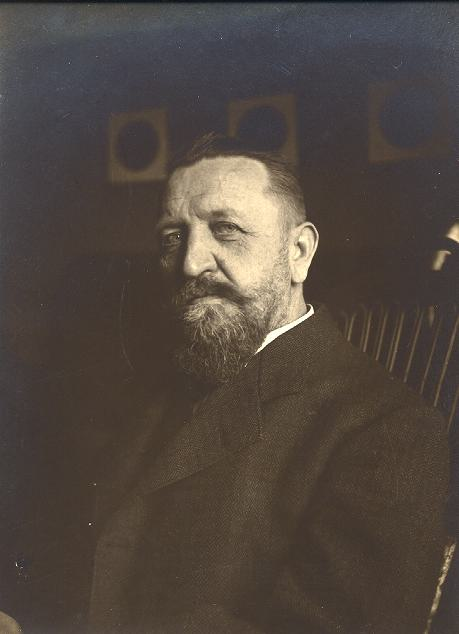
Enno Littmann (left) and Theodor Siebs both published data on Wangerooge Frisian in the 1920s.

The earliest documentation of Wangerooge Frisian was done by the German naturalist Ulrich Jasper Seetzen, who visited the island in 1799. Shortly thereafter, during the winter of 1806–1807, Lorenz Oken – another German naturalist – followed suit. Around this time, there were about two hundred speakers.

The dialect of Wangerooge is well-attested, largely due to the efforts of Heinrich Georg Ehrentraut, a German jurist from Jever. Most of his collection comprises fairy tales, ethnographic works, and texts about life on the island. With the help of his principal informant Anna Metta Claßen, an elderly Wangerooge native, Ehrentraut published most of his work on the dialect in Friesisches Archiv ('Frisian Archive'), his briefly-published academic journal. The journal only saw two volumes, one in 1849 and one in 1854, though his fieldwork took place on four expeditions between 1837 and 1841. The majority of the recorded materials from these trips were written accounts of Claßen's speech. In 1996, Versloot was able to publish the rest of Ehrentraut's documentation after he gained access to his Nachlaß. Ehrentraut's work comprises the majority of the extant corpora.

Only a few sources were collected in the 19th century after Ehrentraut's expeditions. Among them are a handful of collected texts published in an 1854 compendium and a translation of the Parable of the Prodigal Son published twenty years later. In the 1920s, Enno Littmann and Theodor Siebs published some data on Wangerooge Frisian, though the data collection took place in or around 1900. Littmann, however, admitted to actively editing the speech of his informants, some marked with brackets or comments while others are completely unmarked. For example, he repeatedly applies siin, the masculine possessive determiner, "against other information in [his] transcript", so it is unknown what term his informants actually used. While Ehrentraut's account is generally considered to be the most reliable record, he may have also introduced some effects of normalization. It is possible, for example, that he used historical spelling in some words which did not capture elided sounds he noted elsewhere in his work. Siebs captured several audio recordings in the 1920s as well. Between 1924 and 1925, the German linguist Otto Bremer collected a series of sound recordings of the dialect too, though full transcriptions of these have not been published. (Note: Gregersen (2024) states that in personal communication, he and Arjen Versloot did not believe that transcriptions have been made. However, in Versloot (2001), at least part of these recordings have been transcribed to describe long vowel behavior.)

A small corpus of Wangerooge Frisian documents published in the 1920s and 1930s by the Sipperverband der Alt-Wangerooger ('Genealogical Society of Old Wangeroogers') was discovered through a digital search of the Oldenburg State Library. The corpus comprises the parts of the society's bulletin. Most notable among them is a birthday invitation given to the founder of the society – a schoolteacher named Otto Luths – by his aunt Louwine in 1934, which includes a German-language gloss mostly likely provided by Otto himself. The invitation has several noteworthy departures from the language recorded by Ehrentraut and others nearly a hundred years earlier. For example, the term bopp is attested in the 19th-century source material as 'maternal aunt', but Louwine calls herself Otto's bopp despite being related to him through his father's line.

Ehrentraut developed his own German-based orthography for Wangerooge Frisian, which marked long vowels with a circumflex diacritic and stress with an acute. In the 1874 corpus, the editor Johan Winkler was clearly influenced by Ehrentraut's earlier orthography. For instance, he used ⟨ô_{e}⟩ for the centering diphthong /oːə̯/. (Note: Versloot (2001) describes this orthographic convention as the short diphthong /oi/ instead.) However, this compendium departs by marking a subscript r for an unpronounced but historically-present /r/, such as in sjê_{r}l ('man') and bê_{r}n ('child'); despite the orthographic representation, these words were pronounced as if they were spelled sjêl and bên, respectively. Versloot modified Ehrentraut's orthography in 1996, marking long vowels by doubling them and marking stress with an acute; when a long vowel is stressed, the acute is marked on the first vowel in the duplication. (Note: This article uses the Versloot orthography for consistency.)

Taken together, the entirety of the surviving texts have around 100,000 words in total with several thousand unique lexical tokens. While many of the works are unique to Wangerooge Frisian, several others are translations from German, usually biblical texts.

=== Decline ===
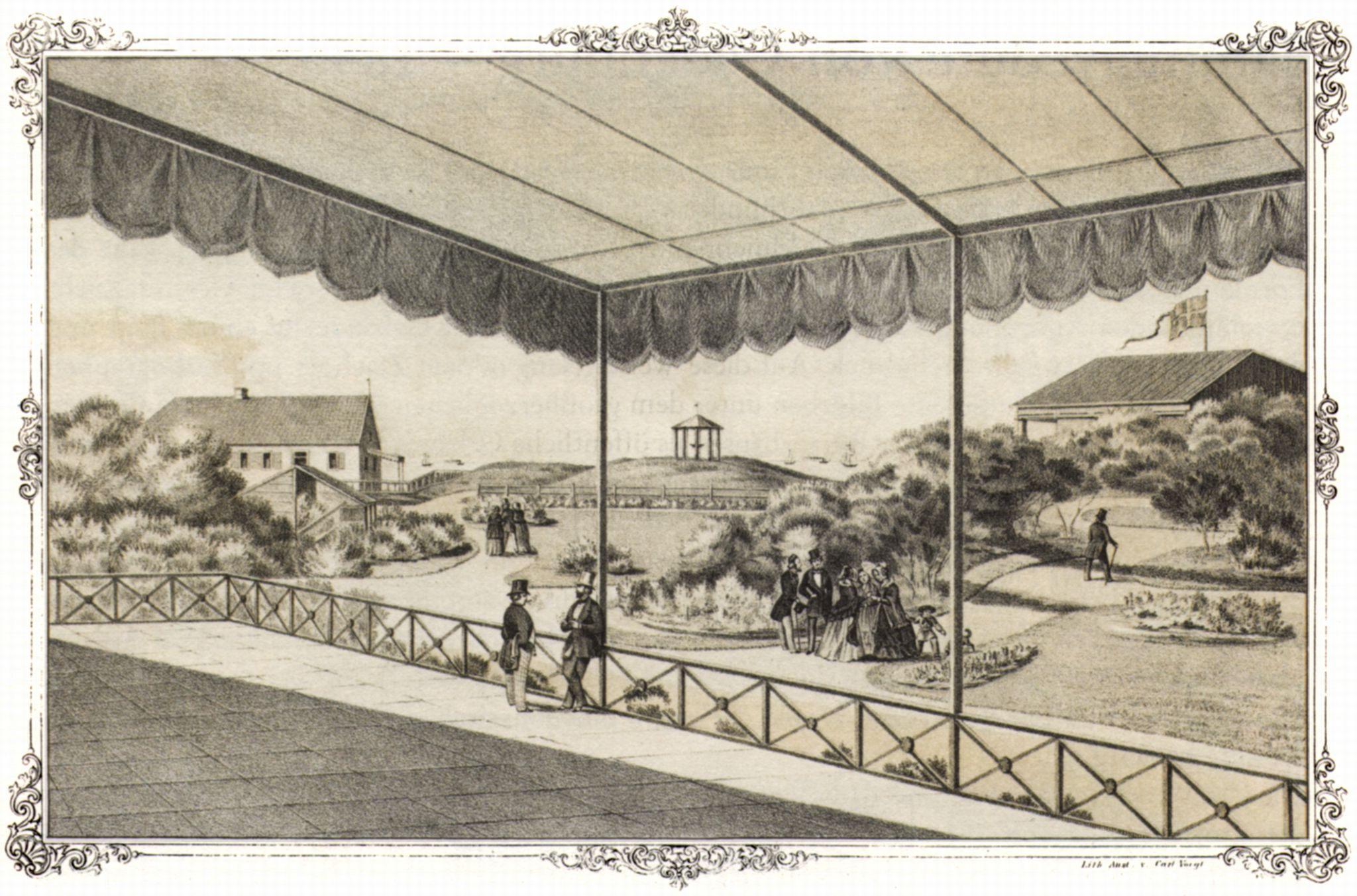
An illustration of life on Wangerooge about thirteen years before the New Year's Flood

Although well-documented, Wangerooge Frisian is now extinct. Around 1854, Wangerooge had a population of about 400, but a devastating storm – now known as the New Year's Flood of 1855 (German: Neujahrsflut von 1855) – struck the western side of the island between Christmas and New Year's Eve. A storm surge on New Year's Eve that continued into the following day destroyed significant portions of the island's only village and by 1861, the island's population had dwindled to only eighty-six residents. Following the Oldenburg government's rebuilding of the island in 1863, speakers of other languages began to outnumber the native Frisian-speaking population, who stopped passing it on to their children. The majority of the island's inhabitants later moved to a small community outside of Varel which they called "New Wangerooge" (Neu-Wangerooge), but they soon adopted the Low German spoken in the area and the national language, High German. In 1890, the German census only counted thirty-two speakers while around ten years later, Siebs reported thirty-six, though they could "no longer [speak] completely clearly"; these thirty-six are considered to have been semi-speakers. When he traveled to Varel in 1927, their number had shrunk to seven elderly speakers around eighty or older.

The last person known to have spoken Wangerooge Frisian died in 1950 in Varel. The two last speakers of the dialect were Heinrich Christian Luths and Hayo Hayen, who both died the same year, though they were likely rememberers or semi-speakers rather than fluent speakers.

== Phonology ==
=== Vowels ===
Vowels
	Front		Near-front	Central	Back
	unrounded	rounded	Near-front	Central	Back
Close	i iː	y (yː)			u uː
Near-close			ɪ ɪː		
Close-mid	ɛ ɛː	ø øː			o oː
Mid				(ə)	
Open-mid		œ œː			ɔ ɔː
Low				a	ɑː

Ehrentraut mentions in his work that /a/ and /ɛ/ both had long forms based on their stress. This vowel length system appears to have been attested by other researchers operating around the same time as Ehrentraut. The dialect's short diphthongs were /ai/, /au/, /oi/, (Note: Gregersen (2024a) describes this diphthong as /oːə̯/ instead.) /ou/, and /ju/; its long diphthongs were /oːi/, /joː/, and /juː/. The phonemes /œ/ and /œː/ were probably loan phonemes. Historically, the Old Frisian diphthongs iā and iū merged after liquids in Wangerooge. While Wurster Frisian had a stronger tendency towards vowel harmony, the Wangerooge dialect also exhibits some of the characteristics; both regressive harmony from the word-final vowel and progressive harmony from the root vowel are attested. Like other Weser Frisian dialects, final /i/, /u/, and /o/ did not neutralize to schwa in coda. To what extent /y/ existed alongside /y:/ remains unclear.

In 1932, the Swedish Germanicist Ernst Löfstedt published work which described the processes by which short vowels in the stem became long in Old Weser Frisian, now termed the "replicated a-umlaut". This process describes the lengthening of short *i and *u in open syllables in the word stem as long as the following vowel was not *a. Some instances of the resulting long i were later rounded in Wangerooge Frisian. Before *a, these vowels underwent a phonological merger with *e and *o, respectively. Examples of this process include wüüduu ('widow') as compared with wükke ('weeks'), where the final e represents a historical *a. At an earlier point in Wangerooge Frisian, known as Old Wangeroogic, final *i and *u were lengthened following historically light syllables, explaining the long u at the end of wüüduu. Old Wangeroogic also experienced a shift from *e to long i in coda as well.

It is unclear precisely under what circumstances Wangerooge Frisian vowels underwent rounding. It appears that the vowels were rounded if the following vowel was rounded – such as wüüduu as compared to widue, the form found in the Rüstring Manuscripts – and in contexts where the vowel was adjacent to a labial, such as in püüper ('pepper') from Old East Frisian piper, or a liquid consonant, as in pürre ('pear') from an earlier unattested *pera. Blocking probably occurred if a long i was found in the following syllable, as in ipiin ('open').

=== Consonants ===
Consonants
		Labial	Labiodental	Dental	Alveolar	Palatal	Velar
Nasal		m			n		
Plosive	voiceless	p			t		k
Plosive	voiced	b			d		g
Fricative	voiceless		f	θ	s		x
Fricative	voiced		v	ð	z		ɣ
Approximant						j	w
Rhotic				r̪			

The consonantal makeup of Wangerooge Frisian is unique in the family in several ways. For one, the rhotic sound was apical instead of alveolar; although this was once common, it is rare among Germanic languages today. Similarly, the dialect has a complete absence of word-initial voiced fricatives. Unlike other Germanic languages, Wangerooge Frisian did not undergo final-obstruent devoicing. The cluster /hw/ was simplified from Old Frisian to a simple /w/, as in woo ('who') from Old Frisian hwa attested in the Rüstring Manuscripts.

While the distribution of dental fricatives was predetermined by position in Old Frisian, the elision of some sounds during the development of the Wangerooge dialect allowed the voiced phoneme to be pronounced in different positions than in earlier forms of the language, namely in word-final position. Based on this historical apocope, this only occurred after long vowels and diphthongs, such as in miið ('to avoid') and sjoo_{e}ð ('to cook'), respectively.

As early as Oken's 1806 visit, the dental fricatives began to collapse into dental stops, which continued to at least until Ehrentraut's journeys during the first half of the 19th century. Oken described the sound as similar – but not identical – to "the English tongue-thrust th" (German: den englischen Zungenstoß th) and stated that not everyone he studied could pronounce the fricative as such. In some instances, /ð/ became [s]. The phonemes /b/, /d/, /p/, /t/, /g/, /k/, /v/, /s/, /m/, /n/, and /l/ all had geminate forms and it is likely that the same is true for /x/, /f/, /z/, and /r/. It is unlikely /ð/ had a geminate form.

Old Weser Frisian underwent a process of "vowel balance", whereby certain vowels were found at the end of words based on the internal structure of the preceding syllable. This process affected the stress pattern of both the Wangerooge and Wursten dialects which are descended from it.

A characteristic of the history of Wangerooge Frisian is the excrescence of r following a schwa flanked by dental stops or a voiced dental fricative in syllabic coda. However, by the time of Ehrentraut, this sound change had been largely reanalyzed through other processes. This insertion also sometimes occurred in contexts in which the schwa was flanked by /n/, such as in the phrase in 'er nacht, where the expected form is *in 'e nacht.

== Morphology ==
Morphologically, Wangerooge Frisian distinguished between two numbers (singular and plural) and three grammatical genders (masculine, feminine, and neuter). While gender is not interpretable from the noun itself, it is marked by the use of other syntactic markers such as definite articles, demonstratives, adjectives, anaphoric and possessive pronouns, and numerals. Gender is not distinguishable in the plural with the use of articles.

Wangerooge Frisian preserved some archaic i-mutations which were leveled in other Germanic languages, such as kiier 'cows' which can be compared with the Early Modern English form kine. Despite this, the dialect also experienced some i-mutation leveling that did not occur in other, more innovative languages, such as pluralizing goos ('goose') as gooz from an earlier gooze form; this form is irregular, but an innovated form as the expected outcome would be *goos or *goosen. The pluralizing suffix -er was later extended to nouns which denoted livestock and household members. This included works like kiier from the original suffixless Old Frisian term kī, as well as others such as laumer ('lambs'), hingster ('horses'), wüüfer ('wives'), and possibly ooiier ('eggs').

== Vocabulary and syntax ==
Despite the relative isolation of the island, terminology was influenced by the mainland. Terms like gefallen were borrowed directly from German ('to appeal to'), while others were calqued instead, such as var langerer tid ('a long time ago') from German vor längerer Zeit. The dialect also experienced semantic influence from German. The term onlidder ('to invite'), for example, originally meant 'to load' (as a ship or a gun), but semantic contamination from German laden ('to invite') appears to have shifted the meaning, as demonstrated in Louwine Luths's birthday invitation.

The dialect experienced some innovation over the course of its existence. The term huskoep ('house purchase'), composed of huus ('house') and koo_{e}p ('purchase'), is not found as a compound in the Ehrentraut corpora. Some verbs were displaced, such as Old Frisian ieva ('to give'), which remained only in a few fossilized phrases (too hoo_{e}p gívve 'to unite in matrimony', lit. 'to give together') and affixed terms (fargívve, 'to forgive'). Other verbs had suppletive forms, such as sjoo ('to see'), which had its suppletive past tense and past participle form (blauket) taken from the otherwise unattested word *biilauk ('to watch', lit. 'to belook'). These suppletive forms were more common in the East Frisian dialects than in any of the other Frisian dialects or Germanic languages.

The term heit, originally meaning 'to be called', (Note: This term is cognate with German heißen and Dutch heten.) was grammaticalized into a copula and is well-attested in Ehrentraut's corpus. Shortly thereafter, this grammaticalization halted and began to completely reverse; there are no attested uses of the copular heit beginning in the second half of the 19th century and onward, despite there being over a hundred such examples in Ehrentraut's records. During the period in which heit was used as a copula, it retained its use as a verb meaning 'to be called', as attested in the following example from Ehrentraut's corpus:

Dan junġst deerfón dan hat 'n gansen grúundúumën, dan hat Hans.
the youngest thereof {that one} is a very {ground stupid one}, {that one} {is called} Hans.
'The youngest of them, he is a very stupid fellow; he is called Hans.'

The use of heit was common, but is nearly always only found in the third-person singular present context as hat. In other grammatical contexts, the original copula wízze ('to be') was used.

Although Old Frisian almost always required a dummy subject, Wangerooge Frisian exhibits a pro-drop tendency; the demonstrative dait, for example, is dropped before heit a little more than fifty percent of the time.

{} Hat liifháftiig der düüvel.
[he] is incarnate the devil
'He is the devil incarnate.'

Like other Germanic languages, Wangerooge Frisian exhibited qualities of a verb-second word order. It only appears to have followed this word order in complement clauses. An example is given below, where the brackets indicate a complement clause.

Nu qua hi jen sin wüüf, [dat hi wul him úpmacki].
now say.3SG he toward his wife [that he want.3SG him go.INF]
'Now he tells his wife that he wants to leave.'

Wangerooge Frisian distinguished between two kinds of definite articles, a strong and a weak form. The forms are as follows:

	Strong	Weak
Neuter	dait	't
Feminine	djuu	de
Masculine	dan	de
Plural	daa	de

The word det was an alternative form of the weak neuter definite article. It appears to have been interchangeable with the 't form. Alternate forms include d', 'e, 'er, der. The form 'er was a possible allomorph of 'e before dental stops; der was similarly allomorphic before dental stops where de and d' are otherwise expected. The reduction may also occur after certain prepositions, as exemplified below:

Nuu laítert yaa hírii iin hállii uut 'er tuun.
now let.PL 3PL 3F.OBL home fetch.INF from WDEF church
'Now they have her brought home from the church.'

The difference between the strong and weak forms of the definite article had syntactic and semantic functions. The strong forms were used in common in anaphoric contexts, expressions of time, and most contexts in which an unfamiliar referent is mentioned. Below is an example of an anaphoric context:

Deer licht 'n gróo_{e}t-en riiz far dan barg, deer dan riiz uurwin kan, dee kricht djuu faun.
EXPL lie.3SG INDF big.M-INDF ogre before SDEF.M mountain REL SDEF.M ogre defeat.INF can.3SG REL get.3SG SDEF.F girl
'There is a big ogre lying in front of the mountain, whoever can defeat the ogre will get the girl.'

The weak forms were found in proper nouns, such as de Turkíi ('Turkey') and de Tääms ('the Thames'), and in generic references, as in un daa farkóo_{e}pet yaa him an de fránsmon ('and then they sell him to the French'). Superlative forms could be weak (de állersómst síithen klóo_{e}der 'the nicest silk clothes') or strong (dait naast weertshuus 'the nearest inn').

== See also ==
- Frisia
- Frisian Islands
- East Frisians
