= Nyimang people =

Ethnic sub-group of the Nuba peoples

Total population
- c. 200,000

Languages
- Nyimang

Religion
- Sunni Islam

Related ethnic groups
- Afitti

The Nyimang are an ethnic sub-group of the Nuba peoples in the Nuba Mountains of South Kordofan in Sudan. Their population may exceed 180,000. Most are Muslims.

== Culture ==
=== Communication ===
They speak Nyima languages, also known as Ama language of the Nilo-Saharan language family. Their language is named after the tribe. There is no written language, but some are trying to create a written language using Latin letters for the sounds.

There are about fifty names for men and about the same for women, they have no special meaning, but are made as they sound good.

=== Society ===
Not many games are played, but one significant exception is kirang. It is a game that is played with a bat that looks much like a cricket bat.

The way people greet each other depends on their generation. For example, people from the same generation greet each other by sliding the palm over the back of the other person's hand. Youths shake each other's hands vigorously, which is how they display their strength to one another. When an adult greets a child, they place their hand on the top of their head.

As for their daily schedule, the first meal is eaten at five to six in the morning. Then, the men tend to the fields until noon, while the women go later because they are preparing food. They have their lunch at noon and then they take care of other daily work. Dinner is held at sunset, and then they wait till about nine before going to sleep. The evening hours are dedicated to quality time with friends and family.

Braids are considered stylish for women and teenagers. Once a boy matures he does not wear braids.

Weddings happen very often, especially since a man has a minimum of two wives. A man goes to a girl's family and asks for her hand. Then, all the men that want to marry the girl have a competition and they are rated on their warrior traits and bravery. The father and the girl's brothers decide on the man for her. Once they decide who it should be, then they get the dowry and the man has to "kidnap" the woman. It is sort of a game they have. If the man does not kidnap the woman, then they will not live in the same house or be officially married. If the groom fails to kidnap the bride, then she stays at her father's house until she becomes the mother of at least three to four children.

=== Art Forms ===
The Nyimang tribe has many different forms of art. They have dances and ceremonies for various events. They celebrate births, weddings, harvests, and the life of someone when they die. They even have a special dance for when they are about to go to war with enemy tribes. They believe it gives them special energy and scares the enemy.

They are also fond of pottery and woodcarvings; they have mud plates with authentic designs that they favor. Their woodcarvings are shown in the form of a pillar with carved designs on them.

They also have great music. Their instruments are not that different from Western instruments; they have string instruments, woodwind, and drums. their favorite instrument is a string instrument that quit resembles the guitar; it is called conyang.

The Nyimang tribe tells many stories to amuse both grown men and children. There is a certain story of how they believe they came from the sky and landed on the Nuba Mountains. They believe this because they saw footprints on the mountains and thought it was the footprints of their ancestors when they first descended from the sky.

==== Architecture ====
The Nyimang live in attached villages very close to mountains, for defence and security reasons, houses are very close, mostly round huts with clay or wooden walls, another one of their architectural achievements. The walls of the house are made of mud and the roofs are made of hay or twigs and leaves. The kitchen or storage room is very big and spacious, they keep some calves in there and meat and vegetables. It is where they keep mostly everything, in their language it is called the "merdang", there is many huts in one family house 4 to 5, and some times more, surrounded with some plants hedging as a fence, the house is usually surrounded by a farm, besides animals small farm in the house for cows and goats

==== Style/Fashion ====
As for their clothing they wear fancy clothing with great embroidery to festivals and special events. Sometimes they wear animal skin. They also wear jewellery such as beads and necklaces; these necklaces are sometimes made of pumpkin skin while others are made of certain nuts. The preferable necklaces are made of certain metals and marbles (the public wears white and black marbles while the married women wear blue marbles in the form of belts). They also wear very, to their personal liking, flashy and colorful clothes. Symbols are used to separate generations rather than used for letters.

=== Social structure ===
Nyimang have different views depending on the gender and the age of a person. The father/husband is supposed to lead the family. If the father has died or is away for some reason then the eldest son leads the family, but the women are never in charge. Adult men and women go to work on the farms early in the morning. When there is a wedding, the father and brother(s) of the girl chooses the husband. The bride has no say in who she wants to marry. Spouses are chosen according to the man's bravery, courage, and so on, because a brave man is at a high position.

Women are supposed to cook and feed the family. They shall care for children who are still too young to work. They also care for small animals and tend to their small vegetable garden if they have one.

Both boys and girls from the age of eight to twenty care for the cattle and other animals. When the rains come they all go to the high lands and camp with the cattle (and each other) for three months. A man can never marry a girl who he considers a friend. He can never touch the girl for fear of being disgraceful. If he does then he will need to be cleansed with a special ceremony led by the Kujur.

Elders are the wise and the old of the village. Some choose to become priests.

There are eight hills and each hill has a chief. The hills are called: Sallara, Tundia, Kallara, Kurmiti, Nitil, Kakara, Fus, and Hajar-Sultan (the hill of the sultan, where the sultan lives and the most important hill of all). A chief of a certain hill is responsible for that hill's residence. He is the one who will solve the problems of that hill. Higher above them is a chief who is the chief of all the hills.

=== Institutions ===
In a family the women do not get much of a say in anything. It is always the men who make the decisions. The father/husband is in charge. If the father is away or is dead then his eldest son is in charge. He decides what is to happen when in crisis or when something is at hand. The Amma tribe's religion depends. About 90% are Muslim, 8% are Christian, and 2% are other African religions. Children's schooling is like normal government schooling. They wake up early morning and go to government school. They have no favorite subjects but learn all the same.

=== Economic base ===
The preferable job that the Nyimang tribes like is agriculture. They like farming and building crops that they find quite valuable. If a member of their tribe goes to the city they prefer to be soldiers or join the police force, to become butchers, to become waiters, and some become bakers. The Nyimang like farming that's why they have numerous crops per person. They include cucumbers, nuts, corn, wheat, and sesame seeds. The Nyimang tribe measures wealth not by money or land, but by cattle and land. Someone who has more cattle than other is considered wealthier. Cattle and land for the Nymang is like a currency. Their tribe also has a balanced trading system: they trade cattle for seeds with other tribes. The seeds and the cattle must be balanced out. If the Amma tribe is short on cattle then the number of seeds they get while rise; it works in vice versa as well.

=== History ===
No one knows where their beliefs originated from or when they came to the Nuba Mountains but as stated before the people believe they came from the sky because they saw footprints on the mountains and think that that was where their ancestors first landed on Earth.

==== Politics ====
Before 1917, during the war against the British, the current Sultan Agabna, led the Nymang against the colonial rulers. He lost the fight and was hanged in 1917. At that time the Nuba Mountains were ruled by Kujurs. All Kujurs were ruled by sultans but each hill had self-rule without too much interference from the sultan. In 1954, when Sudan prepared to gainindependence, Mekks (chiefs) were appointed for each hill. A Nazir was appointed as the ruler of the Mekks. The Sultan still kept his position, but was without power.

Notable Nazir include:

- Kanda Krboos and Amina Dirdimma.

Notable Mekks include:

- Tamor Dura-Mekk of Sallara
- Sallam Darfur-First mekk of Kurmiti
- Nasralla Sarmin-Second mekk of Kurmiti
- Gaa Adin-Mekk of Tundia
- Khalifa Nawy-Mekk of Nitil

Notable and politically involved Nyimang people include:

- Archbishop Philip Abbas Gaboush — the late chairman of the Sudan National Party
- Professor Alamin Hamouda Dabib — the current chairman of the Sudan National Party
- Let. General Awad Salatin Darfour - a former Senior Police Officer and Member of Parliament for Dalanj North and Chief of Security and Defence Parliamentary Committee
- General Ibrahim Nail Edam — a former member of the Revolution Command Council.

Mohammed Ferri-Mekk of Kurmiti- who died recently.

- Professor Hunud Abia Kadouf of Sallara - Former Judge of the Appeal Court of Sudan, founding member of the General Union of the Nuba Mountains and International legal luminary, currently the Vice President of the Council of Sudanese Experts and Scientists Abroad.

== See also ==
- Nuba Mountains
- Index: Nuba peoples
