= East Frisian language =

West Germanic language

East Frisian
- Native to: Germany
- Region: East Frisia
- Ethnicity: East Frisians
- Native speakers: 2,000 (2015)
- Language family: Indo-European: Germanic; West Germanic; North Sea Germanic; Anglo-Frisian; Frisian; East Frisian
- Dialects: Ems; Saterland Frisian Upgant Frisian †: Weser; Wangerooge Frisian † Wursten Frisian † Harlingerland Frisian †
- Writing system: Latin

Official status
- Recognised minority language in: Germany
- Regulated by: Seelter Buund in Saterland/Seelterlound (unofficial)

Language codes
- ISO 639-3: None (mis); Individual code: stq – Saterland Frisian
- Glottolog: sate1242
- Linguasphere: 52-ACA
- Present-day distribution of the Frisian languages in Europe: West Frisian North Frisian East Frisian

East Frisian is one of the Frisian languages. Its last surviving dialect is Saterland Frisian spoken in Saterland in Germany. The language is unrelated to the East Frisian dialect of the Low German language, which is often likewise referred to as "East Frisian".

There once were two main dialects, Ems and Weser. Weser, including the Wursten dialect, Harlingerland dialect and Wangerooge dialect, held out until the 20th century. Ems continues with a couple thousand adult speakers of the Saterland dialect. The other member of the Ems dialect, Upgant Frisian, is extinct.

== Phonology ==
The phonology of East Frisian is linguistically conservative with regards to Old Frisian.

== Old East Frisian and its decline ==
Old East Frisian used to be spoken in East Frisia (Ostfriesland), the region between the Dutch river Lauwers and the German river Weser. The area also included two small districts on the east bank of the Weser, the lands of Wursten and Würden. The Old East Frisian language could be divided into two dialect groups: Weser Frisian to the east, and Ems Frisian to the west. From 1500 onwards, Old East Frisian slowly had to give way in the face of the severe pressure put on it by the surrounding Low German dialects, and nowadays it is all but extinct.

By the middle of the seventeenth century, Ems Frisian had almost completely died out. Weser Frisian, for the most part, did not last much longer, and held on only until 1700, although there are records of it still being spoken in the land of Wursten, to the east of the river Weser, in 1723. It held out the longest on the island of Wangerooge, where the last Weser Frisian speaker died in 1953. Today, the Old East Frisian language is no longer spoken within the historical borders of East Frisia; however, a large number of the inhabitants of that region are still Frisians, referring to their dialect of Low German as Freesk. In this dialect, referred to in Standard German as Ostfriesisch, the Frisian substratum is still evident, despite heavy Germanisation.

== Sater Frisian ==
The last remaining living remnant of Old East Frisian is an Ems Frisian dialect called Sater Frisian or Saterlandic (its native name being Seeltersk), which is spoken in the Saterland area in the former State of Oldenburg, to the south of East Frisia proper. Saterland (Seelterlound in the local language), which is believed to have been colonised by Frisians from East Frisia in the eleventh century, was for a long time surrounded by impassable moors. This, together with the fact that Sater Frisian always had a status superior to Low German among the inhabitants of the area, accounts for the preservation of the language throughout the centuries.

Another important factor was that after the Thirty Years' War, Saterland became part of the bishopric of Münster. As a consequence, it was brought back under control of the Catholic Church, resulting in social separation from Protestant East Frisia since about 1630. Catholic religious law demanded a confirmation of the non-Catholic partner and this condition prevented contact, so marriages of Saterlanders were seldom contracted with East Frisians for some ages.
