= Upgant Frisian =

Extinct East Frisian dialect of Germany

- Native to: Germany
- Region: Upgant-Schott, Lower Saxony
- Extinct: mid-17th century
- Language family: Indo-European: Germanic; West Germanic; North Sea Germanic; Anglo-Frisian; Frisian; East Frisian; Ems; Upgant Frisian

Language codes
- ISO 639-3: None (mis)
- Glottolog: None

Upgant Frisian is an extinct Ems dialect of East Frisian. It was the dialect spoken around the area of Upgant-Schott. The only text preserved in the dialect is a wedding poem by Imel Agena.

== Sample text ==
Below is a comparison of the first five sections of the wedding poem.

Upgant Frisian
Breydloffts gedicht
to eren anda weelbehagen dio erentesten, monnhatten anda
toernemen Eggerick Ulricken, breydgom, anda diw eer- anda
dugentrijcke junffer Tialda Hayunga, breyd, Ulben
Hayungas, drusta to Nodds, aeinige dochter.
Saterlandic Frisian
Wärskupsriemsel,
tou Ere un Wäilbihoagjen fon dän erenfääste, monhaftige un
foarnieme Eggerick Ulricken, Brüdigam, un de eer- un
dugedrieke Juffer Tialda Hayunga, Bräid, Ulben Hayungas,
Druste tou Nürden oankelde/eempelde Dochter.
German
Hochzeitsgedicht,
zu Ehren und Wohlbehagen des ehrenfesten, mannhaften, und
vornehmen Eggerick Ulcken, Bräutigam, und der ehr- und
tugendreichen Jungfrau Tialda Hayunga, Braut, Ulben Hayungas,
Drosten zu Norden einzige Tochter
English

Wedding poem,
in honor and well-being of the honorable, manly, and
noble Eggerick Ulricken, groom, and the honorable and
virtuous maiden Tialda Hayunga, bride, northern reeve Ulben Hayunga's only daughter
