= Harlingerland Frisian =

Extinct East Frisian dialect of Germany

- Freesck
- Native to: Lower Saxony, Germany
- Region: Harlingerland
- Ethnicity: East Frisians
- Extinct: 18th century
- Language family: Indo-European: Germanic; West Germanic; North Sea Germanic; Anglo-Frisian; Frisian; East Frisian; Weser; Harlingerland Frisian

Language codes
- ISO 639-3: –
- Glottolog: None

Harlingerland Frisian is an extinct dialect of the East Frisian language. It was known for giving several features originally in Old Frisian. The language was only documented in the year 1691 with the book Memoriale linguae Frisicae, by Johann Cadovius-Müller. This dialect then slowly vanished and was displaced by the Harlings dialect of Low German. It belonged to the Weser dialects alongside the Wursten and Wangerooge Frisian dialects.

== Sample text ==
Below is a translation of the Lord's Prayer and a comparison with the Saterland Frisian translation.

Harlingerland Frisian	Saterlandic Frisian
Uhse vaahr, di jom sint in den hihmel, gefihret wiss juhse nomme, tookuhme uhs jouse ryhck, jouse will geschia as im hihmel, zo auck up eerden, uhse diggelyckse broode rayck uhs duling uhn veryff uhs, uhse schilde, as wy aück veryffen uhse schildeners, uhn fehr uhs nat in versaickinge, sundern verlais uhs van den baysen, wenthe dyhn is dait ryhck, di krefft uhne heehrligheit, van nuh on, bett in ewigkeit. Ommen.	Uus Foar in dän Hemel, din Nome wäide heliged, läit dien Riek boalde kume, läit din Wille geskjo so in dän Hemel as ap ju Äide. Dou uus dälig dät Brood, dät wie bruke. Un ferreke uus uus Skeelden, so as wie ze uus Skeeldlju-dene ferroat häbe. Un lede uus nit in Fersäikenge, man rädde uus fóar dät Kwode. Dan dienen is dät Riek un ju Krääft un ju Heerdelkaid bit in alle Eeuwigaid. Amen.
