= Afitti people =

Ethnic group in Sudan

Languages
- Afitti, Sudanese Arabic

Religion
- Sunni Islam

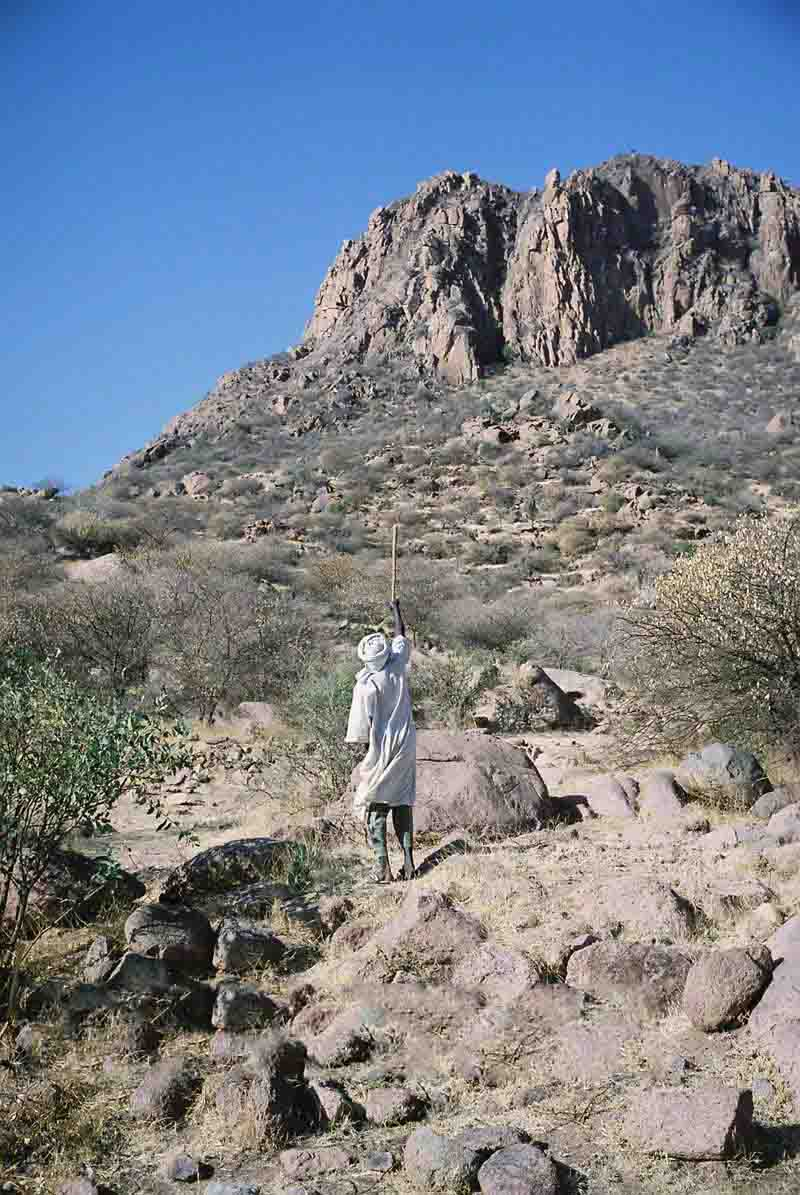
Afitti man pointing at the fabled cave of the ancestor Dimbeir.

Afitti is an ethnic group in North Kurdufan, Sudan. They speak the Afitti language, which had 4,512 speakers in 1984. It is part of the Nilo-Saharan language group and related to the Nyimang language. Afitti live in the Nuba Hills, as part of the Nuba people, and most adhere to the Muslim faith.
