= Nyima languages =

Pair of Eastern Sudanic languages of southern Sudan

Nyima
- Nyimang
- Geographic distribution: Sudan
- Ethnicity: Nyimang
- Linguistic classification: Nilo-Saharan?: Eastern Sudanic; Northern Eastern; Nyima
- Proto-language: Proto-Nyima
- Subdivisions: Ama (Nyimang); Dinik (Afitti)

Language codes
- Glottolog: nyim1244
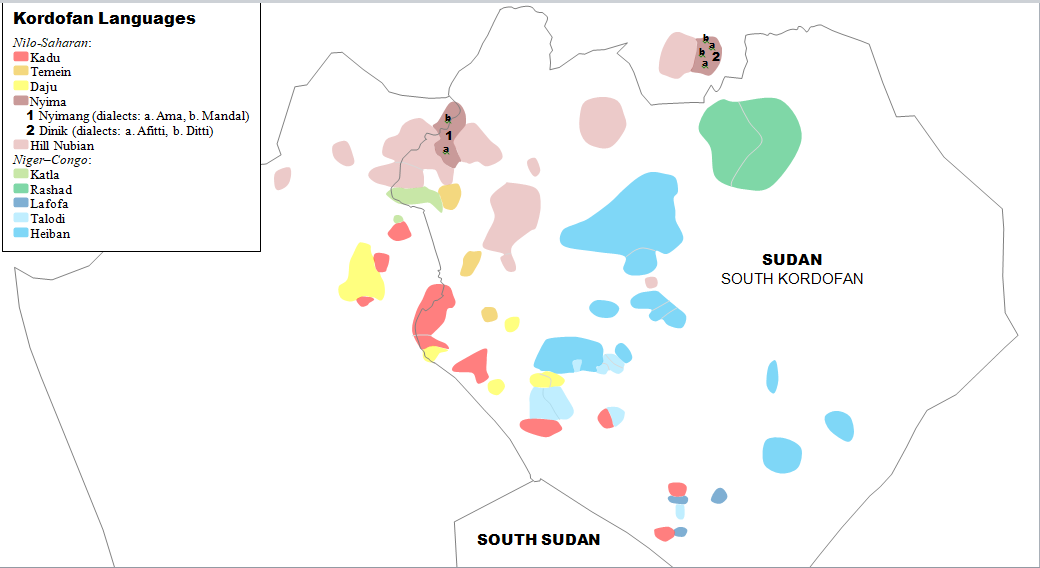

The Nyima languages are a pair of languages of Sudan spoken by the Nyimang of the Nuba Mountains. They appear to be most closely related to the Eastern Sudanic languages, especially the northern group of Nubian, Nara and Tama.

== Languages ==
The languages are:

- Ama (Nyimang) — 160,000 speakers
- Dinik (Afitti) — 4,000 speakers (2009)

Claude Rilly (2010) includes reconstructions for Proto-Nyima.

== See also ==
- List of Northern Eastern Sudanic reconstructions (Wiktionary)
