= Wolfram Euler =

Wolfram Euler (born 5 May 1950) is a German historical linguist and Indo-Europeanist.

== Scientific work ==
Euler gained his doctorate (Ph.D.) in 1979 at the University of Giessen under Professor Rolf Hiersche. Euler's thesis was on parallels in nominal formation between Indo-Iranian languages and Ancient Greek. The study contributed to the identification of Greek as part of the eastern group of Indo-European languages, in spite of the western geographic location of Greece.

Euler has published about 80 scientific articles and books covering most branches of the Indo-European languages; major contributions refer to the Baltic, Indo-Iranian, Greek and Germanic languages.

== Family and private life ==
Wolfram Euler is a distant relative of the mathematician Leonhard Euler (1707–1783). He lives in Munich, is married and father of a son.

== Publications ==
- Indoiranisch-griechische Gemeinsamkeiten der Nominalbildung und deren indogermanische Grundlagen = Indoiranisch-griechische Nominalbildung (= Innsbrucker Beiträge zur Sprachwissenschaft. Vorträge und kleinere Schriften. Bd. 30). Institut für Sprachwissenschaft der Universität Innsbruck, Innsbruck 1979, ISBN 3-85124-550-4 (Zugleich: Gießen, Universität, Dissertation, 1978).
- Indogermanische Wortschatzstudien. Körperteilbenennungen in den ältesten Bibelfassungen indogermanischer Sprachen. Innsbruck 1984 (Innsbruck, University, Habilitations-Schrift, 1984).
- Das Altpreußische als Volkssprache im Kreise der indogermanischen und baltischen Sprachen. Institut für Sprachwissenschaft der Universität Innsbruck, Innsbruck 1988, ISBN 3-85124-595-4.
- Modale Aoristbildungen und ihre Relikte in den alteuropäischen Sprachen. Institut für Sprachwissenschaft der Universität Innsbruck, Innsbruck 1992, ISBN 3-85124-630-6.
- Die Herausbildung von Übergangsdialekten und Sprachgrenzen. Überlegungen am Beispiel des Westgermanischen und Nordischen (= Innsbrucker Beiträge zur Sprachwissenschaft. Vorträge und kleinere Schriften. Bd. 73). Institut für Sprachwissenschaft der Universität Innsbruck, Innsbruck 2003, ISBN 3-85124-687-X.
- Vom Vulgärlatein zu den romanischen Einzelsprachen. Überlegungen zur Aufgliederung von Protosprachen (= Studia interdisciplinaria Aenipontana. Bd. 6). Praesens-Verlag, Wien 2005, ISBN 3-7069-0362-8.
- with Konrad Badenheuer: Sprache und Herkunft der Germanen. Abriss des Protogermanischen vor der Ersten Lautverschiebung. <Language and Origin of the Germanic Peoples: Compendium of the Protogermanic Language prior to First Sound Shift>, 240p., in German with English summary, Verlag Inspiration Un Ltd., Hamburg/London 2009, ISBN 978-3-9812110-1-6.
- Das Westgermanische - von der Herausbildung im 3. bis zur Aufgliederung im 7. Jahrhundert - Analyse und Rekonstruktion <West Germanic - from its Emergence in the 3rd up until its Dissolution in the 7th Century CE - Analyses and Reconstruction>. 244 p., in German with English summary, Verlag Inspiration Un Limited, London/Berlin 2013, ISBN 978-3-9812110-7-8.
- with Konrad Badenheuer: Sprache und Herkunft der Germanen. Abriss des Frühurgermanischen vor der Ersten Lautverschiebung. <Language and Origin of the Germanic Peoples: Compendium of the Early Protogermanic Language prior to First Sound Shift>, 271p., in German with English summary, Verlag Inspiration Un Ltd., 2nd edn., Berlin/London 2021, ISBN 978-3-945127-278.
- Das Westgermanische – von der Herausbildung im 3. bis zur Aufgliederung im 7. Jahrhundert – Analyse und Rekonstruktion. <West Germanic - from its Emergence in the 3rd up until its Dissolution in the 7th Century CE - Analyses and Reconstruction>. 244 p., in German with English summary, 267 p., Verlag Inspiration Unlimited, extended and updated 2nd edition, Berlin 2022, ISBN 978-3-945127-414.
- Flexionsklassenwechsel entlehnter Substantive in älteren und konservativen indogermanischen Sprachen, 140 p., Verlag Inspiration Unlimited, Berlin 2022, ISBN 978-3-945127-438.

== See also ==
- Verners Law
- Germanic parent language
- Centum-satem isogloss
- West Germanic languages
