= West Germanic languages =

Group of languages

West Germanic
- Geographic distribution: Originally between the Rhine, Alps, Elbe, and North Sea; today worldwide
- Native speakers: est. 490 million
- Linguistic classification: Indo-European: Germanic; West Germanic
- Subdivisions: North Sea Germanic – Anglo-Frisian, Low German; Weser–Rhine Germanic – Low Franconian, Central German; Elbe Germanic – Upper German

Language codes
- ISO 639-5: gmw
- Glottolog: west2793
- Linguasphere: 52-AB
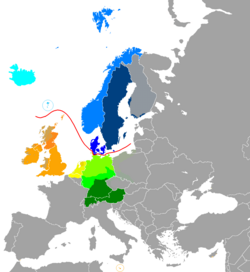
- Extent of Germanic languages in present-day Europe: North Germanic languages; Icelandic; Faroese; Norwegian; Swedish; Danish; West Germanic languages; Scots; English; Frisian; Dutch; Flemish; Low German; Central German (High German); Upper German (High German); Dots indicate areas where it is common for L1 non-Germanic speakers to be L2 speakers of a neighbouring Germanic language.; Lines indicate areas where it is common for L1 Germanic speakers to be L2 speakers of a neighbouring non-Germanic or other Germanic language.

The West Germanic languages constitute the largest of the three branches of the Germanic family of Indo-European languages (the others being the North Germanic and the extinct East Germanic languages). The West Germanic branch is classically subdivided into three branches: North Sea Germanic, which includes English, Scots, the Low German languages, and the Frisian languages; Weser–Rhine Germanic, which encompasses Dutch and its close relatives; and Elbe Germanic, which includes German and its close relatives and variants.

English is by far the most widely spoken West Germanic language, with over one billion speakers worldwide. Within Europe, the three most prevalent West Germanic languages are English, German, and Dutch. Frisian, spoken by about 450,000 people, constitutes a fourth distinct variety of West Germanic. The language family also includes Afrikaans, Yiddish, Low Saxon, Luxembourgish, Hunsrik, and Scots. Additionally, several creoles, patois, and pidgins are based on Dutch, English, or German.

== History ==
=== Origins and characteristics ===
The Germanic languages are traditionally divided into three groups: West, East and North Germanic. In some cases, their exact relation was difficult to determine from the sparse evidence of runic inscriptions, so that some individual varieties have been difficult to classify. This is especially true for the unattested Jute language; today, most scholars classify Jute as a West Germanic variety with several features of North Germanic.

Until the late 20th century, some scholars claimed that all Germanic languages remained mutually intelligible throughout the Migration Period, while others hold that speakers of West Germanic dialects like Old Frankish and speakers of Gothic were already unable to communicate fluently by around the 3rd century AD. As a result of the substantial progress in the study of Proto–West Germanic in the early 21st century, there is a growing consensus that East and West Germanic indeed would have been mutually unintelligible at that time, whereas West and North Germanic remained partially intelligible.

Dialects with the features assigned to the western group formed from Proto-Germanic in the late Jastorf culture (c. 1st century BC). The West Germanic group is characterized by a number of phonological, morphological and lexical innovations or archaisms not found in North and East Germanic. Examples of West Germanic phonological particularities are:

- The delabialization of all labiovelar consonants except word-initially. (However, indirect evidence, such as the non-palatalized geminate [kk] of Old English þicce, implies that a cluster *kw existed word-medially during Proto-West Germanic: this cluster must have undergone delabialization independently in the descendant West Germanic languages.)
- Change of *-zw- and *- đw- to *-ww- e.g. *izwiz > *iwwiz 'you' dat.pl.; *feđwōr > *fewwōr 'four'.
- [ð], the fricative allophone of /d/, becomes [d] in all positions (The remaining fricative allophones [β] and [ɣ] are retained). This must have occurred after *-zw- and *- đw- have become *-ww-.
- Replacement of the second-person singular preterite ending -t with -ī (indicative and subjunctive mood). For more than 150 years there has been a scientific debate on the best explanation of these difficult forms. Today, some linguists, beginning with J. V. Fierlinger in 1885 and followed by R. Löwe (1907), (Note: Quoted by Hirt.) O. Behaghel (1922), Jakob Sverdrup (1927), Hermann Hirt (1932), E. Polomé (1964), W. Meid (1971), E. Hill (2004), K.-H. Mottausch and W. Euler (1992ff.) explain this ending as a relic of the Indo-European aorist tense. Under this assumption, the ending -t would have replaced older -ī(z). Sceptical about this explanation – and mostly explaining these forms as influenced by optative forms – are W. Scherer (1868), W. L. van Helten (before 1917), Edward Schröder (1921), Bammesberger (1986) and Don Ringe (2014).
- Loss of word-final /z/. Only Old High German preserves it at all (as /r/) and only in single-syllable words. Following the later loss of word-final /a/ and /aN/, this made the nominative and accusative of many nouns identical.
- Loss of final *-a (including from PGmc. *-an#) in polysyllables: e.g. acc. sg. OHG horn vs. ORu. horna 'horn'; this change must have occurred after the loss of word-final /z/.
- West Germanic gemination: lengthening of all consonants except /r/ before /j/.; this change must have occurred after the loss of final *-a.

A relative chronology of about 20 sound changes from Proto–Northwest Germanic to Proto–West Germanic (some of them only regional) was published by Don Ringe in 2014.

A phonological archaism of West Germanic is the preservation of grammatischer Wechsel in most verbs, particularly in Old High German. This implies the same for West Germanic, whereas in East and North Germanic many of these alternations (in Gothic almost all of them) had been levelled out analogically by the time of the earliest texts.

A common morphological innovation of the West Germanic languages is the development of a gerund.

Common morphological archaisms of West Germanic include:

- The preservation of an instrumental case,
- the preservation of the athematic verbs (e.g., Anglo-Saxon dō(m), Old Saxon dōm, OHG. tōm "I do"),
- the preservation of some traces of the aorist (in Old English and Old High German, but neither in Gothic nor in North Germanic).

Furthermore, the West Germanic languages share many lexemes not existing in North Germanic or East Germanic – archaisms as well as common neologisms. Some lexemes have specific meanings in West Germanic and there are specific innovations in word formation and derivational morphology, for example neologisms ending with modern English -ship (< wgerm. -*skapi, cf. German -schaft) like friendship (< wg. *friund(a)skapi, cf. German Freundschaft) are specific to the West Germanic languages and are thus seen as a Proto West Germanic innovation.

=== Validity of West Germanic as a subgroup ===
Since at least the early 20th century, a number of morphological, phonological, and lexical archaisms and innovations have been identified as specifically West Germanic. Since then, individual Proto–West Germanic lexemes have also been reconstructed. Yet, there was a long dispute if these West Germanic characteristics had to be explained with the existence of a West Germanic proto-language or rather with Sprachbund effects. Hans Frede Nielsen's 1981 study Old English and the Continental Germanic Languages made the conviction grow that a West Germanic proto-language did exist. But up until the 1990s, some scholars doubted that there was once a Proto–West Germanic proto-language which was ancestral only to later West Germanic languages. In 2002, Gert Klingenschmitt presented a series of pioneering reconstructions of Proto–West Germanic morphological paradigmas and new views on some early West Germanic phonological changes, and in 2013 the first monographic analysis and description of Proto–West Germanic was published (second edition 2022).

Today, there is a scientific consensus (Note: "A West Germanic protolanguage is uncontroversial".) on what Don Ringe stated in 2012, that "these [phonological and morphological] changes amount to a massive evidence for a valid West Germanic clade".

According to one proposal, after East Germanic broke off (an event usually dated to the 2nd or 1st century BC), the remaining Germanic languages, the Northwest Germanic languages, divided into four main dialects: North Germanic, and the three groups conventionally called "West Germanic", namely:

- Northwest Germanic
  - North Sea Germanic, ancestral to Anglo-Frisian and Old Saxon
  - Weser–Rhine Germanic, ancestral to Old Dutch and present as a substrate or superstrate in some of the Central Franconian and Rhine Franconian dialects of Old High German
  - Elbe Germanic, ancestral to the Upper German and most Central German dialects of Old High German, and the extinct Langobardic language.

Although there is quite a bit of knowledge about North Sea Germanic or Anglo-Frisian (because of the characteristic features of its daughter languages, Anglo-Saxon/Old English and Old Frisian), linguists know almost nothing about "Weser–Rhine Germanic" and "Elbe Germanic". In fact, both terms were coined in the 1940s to refer to groups of archaeological findings, rather than linguistic features. Only later were the terms applied to hypothetical dialectal differences within both regions. Even today, the very small number of Migration Period runic inscriptions from the area, many of them illegible, unclear or consisting only of one word, often a name, is insufficient to identify linguistic features specific to the two supposed dialect groups.

Evidence that East Germanic split off before the split between North and West Germanic comes from a number of linguistic innovations common to North and West Germanic, including:

- The lowering of Proto-Germanic ē (/ɛː/, also written ǣ) to ā.
- The development of umlaut.
- The rhotacism of /z/ to /r/.
- The development of the demonstrative pronoun ancestral to English this.

Under that view, the properties that the West Germanic languages have in common, separate from the North Germanic languages, are not necessarily inherited from a "Proto–West Germanic" language, but may have spread by language contact among the Germanic languages spoken in Central Europe, not reaching those spoken in Scandinavia or reaching them much later. Rhotacism, for example, was largely complete in West Germanic while North Germanic runic inscriptions still clearly distinguished the two phonemes. There is also evidence that the lowering of ē to ā occurred first in West Germanic and spread to North Germanic later since word-final ē was lowered before it was shortened in West Germanic, but in North Germanic the shortening occurred first, resulting in e that later merged with i. However, there are also a number of common archaisms in West Germanic shared by neither Old Norse nor Gothic. Some authors who support the concept of a West Germanic proto-language claim that, not only shared innovations can require the existence of a linguistic clade, but also that there are archaisms that cannot be explained simply as retentions later lost in the North or East, because this assumption can produce contradictions with attested features of the other branches.

Concerning the existence of a Proto–West Germanic clade Ringe has argued that "all the West Germanic languages share several highly unusual innovations that virtually force us to posit a West Germanic clade", although "the internal subgrouping of both North Germanic and West Germanic is very messy, and it seems clear that each of those subfamilies diversified into a network of dialects that remained in contact for a considerable period of time (in some cases right up to the present)".

=== The reconstruction of Proto–West Germanic ===
Several scholars have published reconstructions of Proto–West Germanic morphological paradigms and many authors have reconstructed individual Proto–West Germanic morphological forms or lexemes. The first comprehensive reconstruction of the Proto–West Germanic language was published in 2013 by Wolfram Euler, followed in 2014 by the study of Donald Ringe and Ann Taylor.

=== Dating Proto–West Germanic ===
If indeed Proto–West Germanic existed, it must have been between the 2nd and 7th centuries. Until the late 2nd century AD, the language of runic inscriptions found in Scandinavia and in Northern Germany were so similar that Proto–North Germanic and the Western dialects in the south were still part of one language ("Proto–Northwest Germanic").

Sometime after that, the split into West and North Germanic occurred. By the 4th and 5th centuries the great migration set in. By the end of the 6th century, the area in which West Germanic languages were spoken, at least by the upper classes, had tripled compared to the year 400. This caused an increasing disintegration of the West Germanic language and finally the formation of the daughter languages.

It has been argued that, judging by their nearly identical syntax, the West Germanic dialects were closely enough related to have been mutually intelligible up to the 7th century. (Note: Graeme Davis notes "the languages of the Germanic group in the Old period are much closer than has previously been noted. Indeed it would not be inappropriate to regard them as dialects of one language. They are undoubtedly far closer one to another than are the various dialects of modern Chinese, for example. A reasonable modern analogy might be Arabic, where considerable dialectical diversity exists but within the concept of a single Arabic language.") Over the course of this period, the dialects diverged successively. The High German consonant shift that occurred mostly during the 7th century AD in what is now southern Germany, Austria, and Switzerland can be considered the end of the linguistic unity among the West Germanic dialects, although its effects on their own should not be overestimated. Bordering dialects very probably continued to be mutually intelligible even beyond the boundaries of the consonant shift.

=== Middle Ages ===
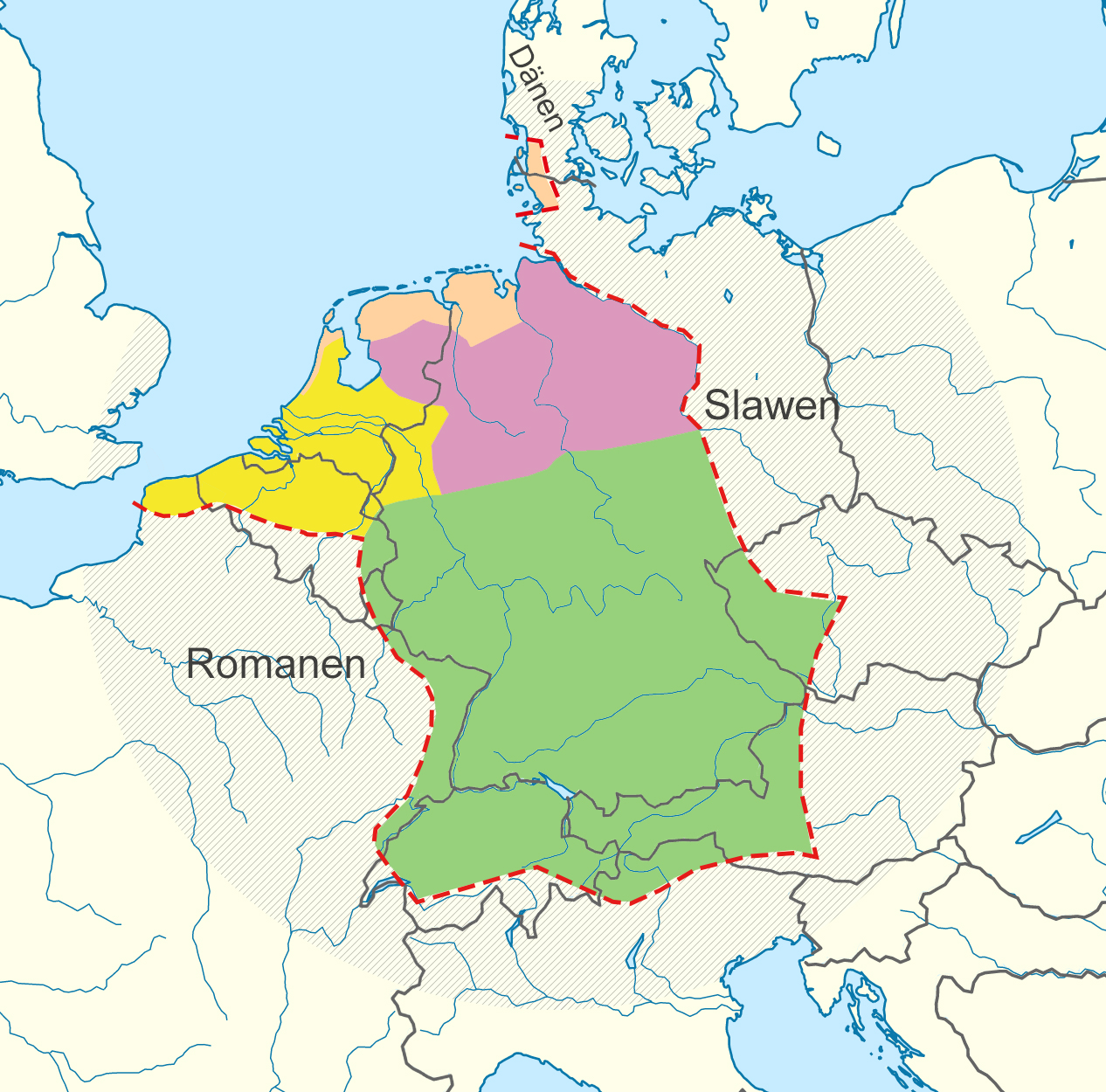
The approximate extent of the continental West Germanic languages in the early 10th century Old Dutch Old High German Old Frisian Old Saxon Line marking the boundaries of the continental West Germanic dialect continuum.

During the Early Middle Ages, the West Germanic languages were separated by the insular development of Old and Middle English on one hand, and by the High German consonant shift on the continent on the other.

The High German consonant shift distinguished the High German languages from the other West Germanic languages. By early modern times, the span had extended into considerable differences, ranging from Highest Alemannic in the South (the Walliser dialect being the southernmost surviving German dialect) to Northern Low Saxon in the North. Although both extremes are considered German, they are not mutually intelligible. The southernmost varieties have completed the second sound shift, whereas the northern dialects remained unaffected by the consonant shift.

Of modern German varieties, Low German is the one that most resembles modern English. The district of Angeln (or Anglia), from which the name English derives, is in the extreme northern part of Germany between the Danish border and the Baltic coast. The area of the Saxons (parts of today's Schleswig-Holstein and Lower Saxony) lay south of Anglia. The Angles and Saxons, two Germanic tribes, in combination with a number of other peoples from northern Germany and the Jutland Peninsula, particularly the Jutes, settled in Britain following the end of Roman rule in the island. Once in Britain, these Germanic peoples eventually developed a shared cultural and linguistic identity as Anglo-Saxons; the extent of the linguistic influence of the native Romano-British population on the incomers is debatable.

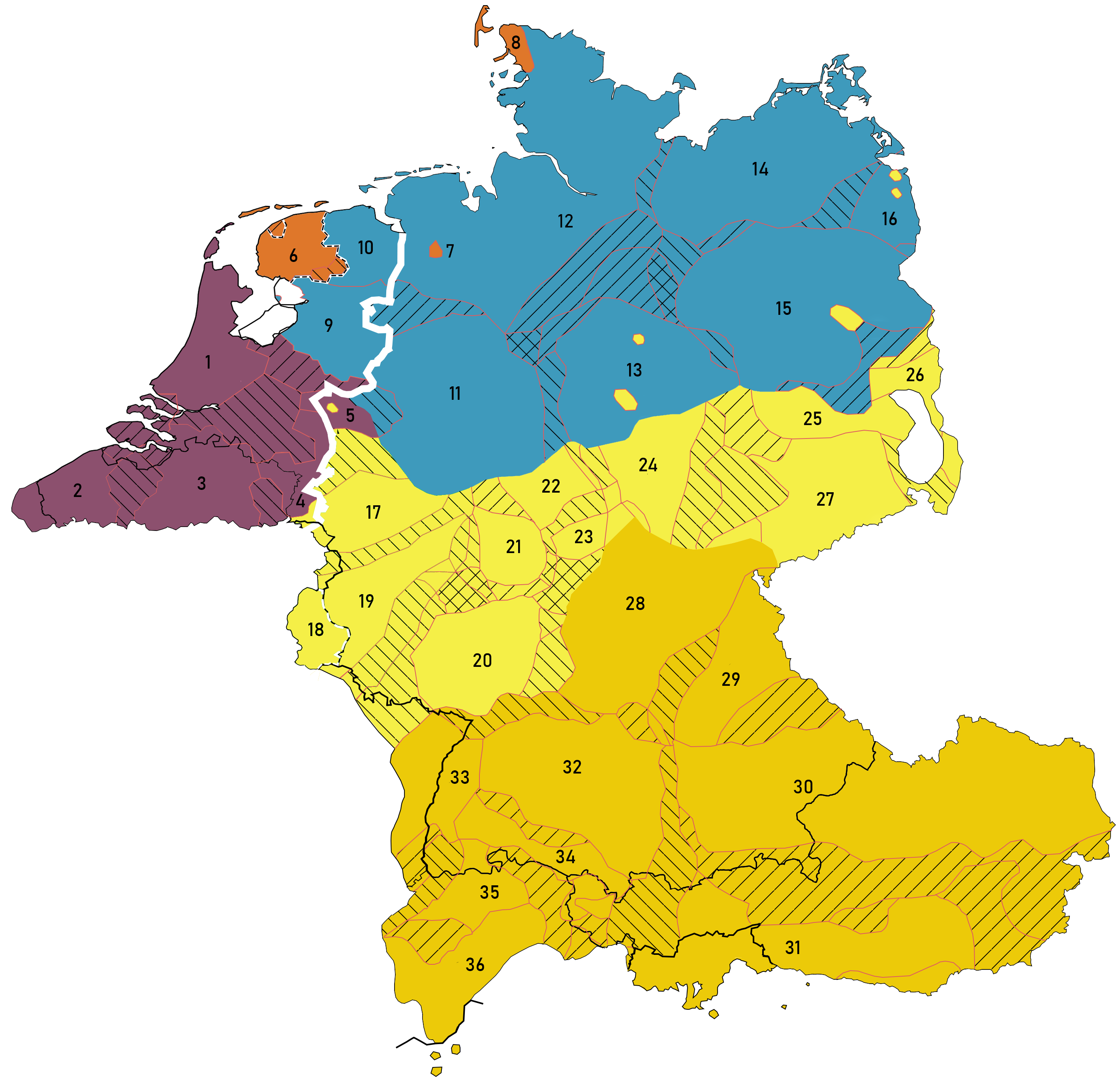
The varieties of the continental West Germanic dialect continuum since 1945: Low Franconian or Netherlandic Frisian Low Saxon or Low German Central German Upper German

== Family tree ==
Grouping of the main Germanic tribes (which can be equated with their languages/dialects) according to Friedrich Maurer

Divisions between subfamilies of continental Germanic languages are rarely precisely defined; most form dialect continua, with adjacent dialects being mutually intelligible and more separated ones not.

- West Germanic languages
  - North Sea Germanic / Ingvaeonic languages
    - Anglo-Frisian
      - Anglic
        - English
        - Irish Middle English / Hiberno-Norman / Irish Anglo-Norman †
          - Fingalian †
          - Yola †
        - Scots
      - Frisian
        - West Frisian
          - Hindeloopen Frisian
          - Schiermonnikoog Frisian
          - Westlauwers–Terschellings
            - Terschelling Frisian
            - West Lauwers Frisian
              - Clay Frisian
              - Wood Frisian
                - Westereendersk
        - East Frisian
          - Ems
            - Saterland
            - Upgant †
          - Weser †
            - Harlingerland †
            - Wangerooge †
            - Wursten †
        - North Frisian
          - Insular
            - Föhr–Amrum
              - Amrum
              - Föhr
            - Heligoland
            - Sylt
          - Mainland
            - Bökingharde
            - Goesharde
            - Karrharde
            - Strand
              - Halligen
            - Wiedingharde
    - Low German
      - Northern Low Saxon
      - Westphalian
      - Eastphalian
      - Marchian
      - Mecklenburgisch-Vorpommersch
      - Central Pomeranian
      - East Pomeranian (moribund)
      - Low Prussian (moribund)
      - Dutch Low Saxon
  - Low Franconian
    - Dutch (West/North Low Franconian)
      - West Flemish
      - East Flemish
      - Zeelandic
      - Central Dutch
        - Hollandic
          - Afrikaans
            - Arabic Afrikaans
          - Kaaps
        - Kleverlandish
      - Brabantian
    - Limburgish (East/South Low Franconian)
  - High German
    - Central German
      - Central Franconian
        - Ripuarian
        - Luxembourgish
      - Rhine Franconian, including the dialects of Hessen, Pennsylvania German, and most of those from Lorraine
        - Pennsylvania Dutch
      - Thuringian
      - Upper Saxon German
      - Schlesisch–Wilmesau
        - Bielsko-Biała
          - Halcnovian
          - Wymysorys
        - Silesian (moribund)
      - High Prussian (moribund)
    - Upper German
      - Alemannic, including Swiss German and Alsatian
      - Swabian
      - Bavarian
      - East Franconian
      - South Franconian
      - Lombardic †
    - Yiddish (a language based on Middle High German)

== Comparison of phonological and morphological features ==
The following table shows a list of various linguistic features and their extent among the West Germanic languages, organized roughly from northwest to southeast. Some may only appear in the older languages but are no longer apparent in the modern languages.

| | Old English | Old Frisian | Old Saxon | Old Dutch | Old Central German | Old Upper German |
|---|---|---|---|---|---|---|
| Palatalisation of velars | Yes | Yes | Rare | No | No | No |
| Unrounding of front rounded vowels | Partial | Yes | No | Southwestern | No | No |
| Loss of intervocalic *-h- | Yes | Yes | Developing | Yes | Developing | No |
| Class II weak verb ending *-(ō)ja- | Yes | Yes | Sometimes | No | No | No |
| Merging of plural forms of verbs | Yes | Yes | Yes | No | No | No |
| Ingvaeonic nasal spirant law | Yes | Yes | Yes | Rare | No | No |
| Loss of the reflexive pronoun | Yes | Yes | Most dialects | Most dialects | No | No |
| Loss of final *-z in single-syllable words | Yes | Yes | Yes | Yes | No | No |
| Reduction of weak class III to four relics | Yes | Yes | Yes | Yes | No | No |
| Monophthongization of *ai | Yes | Yes | Usually | Usually | Partial | Partial |
| Monophthongization of *au | No | Yes | Yes | Yes | Partial | Partial |
| Diphthongization of *ē, *ō | No | No | Rare | Yes | Yes | Yes |
| Final-obstruent devoicing | No | No | Developing | Yes | Developing | No |
| Loss of initial *h- before consonant | No | No | No | Yes | Yes | Developing |
| Loss of initial *w- before consonant | No | No | Developing | No | Most dialects | Yes |
| High German consonant shift | No | No | No | No | Partial | Yes |

The following table shows some comparisons of consonant development in the respective dialect/language (online examples though) continuum, showing the gradually growing partake in the High German consonant shift and the anglofrisian palatalization. The table uses IPA, to avoid confusion via orthographical differences. The realisation of [r] will be ignored.

C = any consonant, A = back vowel, E = front vowel

| Proto West Germanic | *θ- | *-ð- | *-β- | *-β | *g- | *-Aɣ- | *-Eɣ- | *-Ak- | *-Ak | *-Ek- | *-Ek | *d- | *-d- | *b- | *sA- | *sE- | *sk | *-t- | *-p- | *-tt- | *t- | *-pp- | *p- | *-kk- | *kA- | *kE- |
|---|---|---|---|---|---|---|---|---|---|---|---|---|---|---|---|---|---|---|---|---|---|---|---|---|---|---|
| PR-English | θ | ð | v | f | ɣ | | j | k | | t̠ʃ | | d | | b | s | ʃ | ʃ | t | p | t | | p | p | k | k | t̠ʃ |
| Frisian | t | ɾ~d | v | f | ɣ | | j | k | | k | | d | | b | s | ʃ | sk | t | p | t | | p | p | k | k | t̠ʃ |
| South Low Franconian | d | d | v | f | ɣ | | | k | | k | | d | | b | z | | sx | t | p | t | | p | p | k | k | |
| North Low Franconian (Dutch) | d | d | v | f | x | x | ç | k | | k | | d | | b | z | | sx | t | p | t | | p | p | k | k | |
| West Low German | d | d | v | f | x | x | ç | k | | k | | d | | b | z | | ʃ | t | p | t | | p | p | k | k | |
| North/Central Low German | d | d | v | f | g | x | ç | k | | k | | d | | b | z | | ʃ | t | p | t | | p | p | k | k | |
| East Low German | d | d | v | f | g | ʝ | ʃ | k | | k | | d | | b | z | | ʃ | t | p | t | | p | p | k | k | |
| West Central German | d | d | v | f | g | x | ç | x | | ʃ | | t | | b | z | | ʃ | t | p | t͡s | | p | p | k | k | |
| Mid Central German | d | ɾ | v | b | g | ɣ | ʝ | ɣ | x | ʒ | ʃ | d | | b | z | | ʃ | z | v | t͡s | | b | p | g | k | |
| East Central German | d | d | b | b | g | g | | x | | ʃ | | t | | b | z | | ʃ | s | f | t͡s | | p | p | k | k | |
| Upper German (only partly HG) | d | d | b | b | g | g | | x | | ç | | t | | b | z | | ʃ | s | f | t͡s | | p͡f | | k | k | |
| -> some southernmost dialects | d | d | b | b | k | g | | x | | x | | t | | p | s | | ʃ | s | f | t͡s | | p͡f | | k͡x | | |

== Phonology ==
The phonological system of the West Germanic branching as reconstructed is mostly similar to that of Proto-Germanic, with some changes in the categorization and phonetic realization of some phonemes. Phones written in parentheses represent allophones and are not themselves independent phonemes.

=== Consonants ===
Some notable differences in the consonant system of West Germanic from Proto-Germanic are:

- Fortition of [ð] to [d] in all positions
- Per Ringe and Taylor's analysis, labiovelar consonants /kʷ/, /xʷ/, and /ɡʷ/ were resolved into clusters /kw/, /xw/, and /ɡw/ respectively. These were eventually delabialized when not word-initial.
- The transition of /z/ into a new sound, often transcribed as ⟨ʀ⟩, speculated to have been a further back fricative such as [ʒ] or [ʐ]. It eventually merged with /r/, in a process called rhotacism
- A process referred to as West Germanic gemination, where all consonants except for /r/ were geminated if they preceded /j/

Proto-West Germanic consonants
| | | Labial | Coronal | | Dorsal | |
| | | Labial | plain | sib. | plain | labzd. |
|---|---|---|---|---|---|---|
| Nasal | | m | n | | (ŋ) | |
| Stop | voiceless | p | t | | k | |
| Stop | voiced | b | d | | (ɡ) | |
| Fricative | voiceless | ɸ | θ | s | x | |
| Fricative | voiced | (β) | | ʀ [ʒ ~ ʐ^{?}] | ɣ | |
| Sonorant | median | | r | | j | w |
| Sonorant | lateral | | l | | | |

Notes:

1. [ŋ] was an allophone of /n/ before velar obstruents.
2. [β] was an allophone of /b/ word medially, except when preceded by /m/ or geminated.
3. [ɡ] was an allophone of /ɣ/ when preceded by [ŋ] or geminated.

=== Vowels ===
Some notable differences in the vowel system of West Germanic from Proto-Germanic are:

- All phonemic nasal vowels are either deleted or denasalized
- Reduction of overlong vowels to simple long vowels
- Lowering of /ɛː/ to /æː/, then to /ɑː/, or /oː/ if it was before a nasal consonant
- Raising of /ɔː/ to /oː/
- The creation of a new long /eː/ phoneme, from the monophthongization of /ɑi/ in unstressed syllables
- The creation of a new short /o/ phoneme, from the lowering of /u/ when /ɑ/ or /oː/ were in the next syllable, as a result of a-mutation
- The short back vowels /ɑ/ and /u/ had front allophones [æ] and [y] when /i/ or /j/ were in the next syllable, as a result of i-mutation

Proto-West Germanic vowels
| Type | Front | | Back | |
| Type | short | long | short | long |
|---|---|---|---|---|
| Close | i (y) | iː | u | uː |
| Mid | e | eː | o | oː |
| Open | (æ) | | ɑ | ɑː |

== Morphology ==
=== Nouns ===
The noun paradigms of Proto–West Germanic have been reconstructed as follows:

| Case | Nouns in -a- (m.) *dagă (day) | | Nouns in -ja- *herjă (army) | | Nouns in -ija- *hirdijă (herder) | | Nouns in -a- (n.) *joką (yoke) | | Nouns in -ō- *gebu (gift) | | Nouns in -i- *gastĭ/*gasti (guest) | | Nouns in -u- *sunu (son) | | Nouns in -u- (n.) *fehu (cattle) | |
| Case | Singular | Plural | Singular | Plural | Singular | Plural | Singular | Plural | Singular | Plural | Singular | Plural | Singular | Plural | Singular | Plural |
|---|---|---|---|---|---|---|---|---|---|---|---|---|---|---|---|---|
| Nominative | *dag/dagă | *dagō?/dagā | *herjă/*hari | *herjā/*harjō? | *hirdijă | *hirdijō | *joką | *joku | *gebu | *gebā/*gebō | *gastĭ/*gasti | *gastī | *sunu | *sunī<*suniwi/*suniwi, -ō | *fehu | (?) |
| Vocative | *dag(ă) | *dagō?/dagā | *herjă/*hari | *herjā/*harjō? | *hirdī | *hirdijō | *joką | *joku | *gebu | *gebā/*gebō | *gastĭ/*gasti | *gastī | *sunu | *sunī<*suniwi/*suniwi, -ō | *fehu | (?) |
| Accusative | *dag/dagă | *dagą̄?/dagą | *herjă/*hari | *herją/*harją̄? | *hirdiją | *hirdiją̄ | *joką | *joku | *geba/*gebā | *gebā | *gastĭ/*gasti | *gasti/*gastį̄ | *sunu | *sunu < *sunų / *sunų̄? | *fehu | (?) |
| Genitive | *dagas | *dagō | *herjes/*harjas | *herjō/*harjō | *hirdijas | *hirdijō | *jokas | *jokō | *gebā | *gebō(nō)/*gebō | *gastes/*gastī | *gastijō | *sunō | *suniwō | *fehō | (?) |
| Dative | *dagē | *dagum | *herjē/*harjē | *herjum/*harjum | *hirdijē | *hirdijum | *jokē | *jokum | *gebu/*gebē | *gebōm | *gastē/*gastī | *gastim | *suniu < *suniwi / *suniwi, -ō | *sunum | *fehiwi, -ō | (?) |
| Instrumental | *dagu | *dagum | *herju/*harju | *herjum/*harjum | *hirdiju | *hirdijum | *joku | *jokum | *gebu | *gebōm | *gastē/*gastī | *gastim | *sunu < *sunū / *sunu | *sunum | *fehu | (?) |

== West Germanic vocabulary ==
The following table compares a number of Frisian, English, Scots, Yola, Dutch, Limburgish, German and Afrikaans words with common West Germanic (or older) origin. The grammatical gender of each term is noted as masculine (m.), feminine (f.), or neuter (n.) where relevant.

| West Frisian | English | Scots | Yola | Afrikaans | Dutch | Limburgish | Standard High German | Old English | Old High German | Proto–West Germanic | Proto-Germanic |
|---|---|---|---|---|---|---|---|---|---|---|---|
| kaam | comb | kaim | khime / rack | kam | kam m. | kâmp | Kamm m. | camb m. | camb m. | kąbă [see inscription of Erfurt-Frienstedt], *kambă m. | *kambaz m. |
| dei | day | day | dei | dag | dag m. | daag | Tag m. | dæġ m. | tag m. | *dagă m. | *dagaz m. |
| rein | rain | rain | rhyne | reën | regen m. | rengel, raege | Regen m. | reġn m. | regan m. | *regnă m. | *regnaz m. |
| wei | way | wey | wei / wye | weg | weg m. | weeg | Weg m. | weġ m. | weg m. | *wegă m. | *wegaz m. |
| neil | nail | nail | niel | nael | nagel m. | nieëgel | Nagel m. | næġel m. | nagal m. | *naglă m. | *naglaz m. |
| tsiis | cheese | cheese | cheese | kaas | kaas m. | kieës | Käse m. | ċēse, ċīese m. | chāsi, kāsi m. | *kāsī m. | *kāsijaz m. (late Proto-Germanic, from Latin cāseus) |
| tsjerke | church | kirk | chourch | kerk | kerk f. | kêrk | Kirche f. | ċiriċe f. | chirihha, *kirihha f. | *kirikā f. | *kirikǭ f. (from Ancient Greek kuriakón "belonging to the lord") |
| sibbe | sib; sibling (Note: Original meaning "relative" has become "brother or sister" in English.) | sib | sibbe (dated) / meany | – | sibbe f. | – | Sippe f. | sibb f. "kinship, peace" | sippa f. [cp. Old Saxon: sibbia] | sibbju, sibbjā f. | *sibjō f. "relationship, kinship, friendship" |
| kaai f. | key | key | kei / kie | sleutel | sleutel m. | slueëtel | Schlüssel m. | cǣġ(e), cǣga f. "key, solution, experiment" | sluzzil m. | *slutilă m., *kēgă f. | *slutilaz m. "key"; *kēgaz, *kēguz f. "stake, post, pole" |
| ha west | have been | hae(s)/hiv been | ha bin | was gewees | ben geweest | bin geweis(t) | bin gewesen | | | | |
| twa skiep | two sheep | twa sheep | twye zheep | twee skape | twee schapen n. | twieë schäöp | zwei Schafe n. | twā sċēap n. | zwei scāfa n. | *twai skēpu n. | *twai(?) skēpō n. |
| hawwe | have | hae | ha | het | hebben | hebbe, höbbe | haben | habban, hafian | habēn | *habbjană | *habjaną |
| ús | us | us | ouse | ons | ons | os | uns | ūs | uns | *uns | *uns |
| brea | bread | breid | breed | brood | brood n. | mik, broeëd | Brot n. | brēad n. "fragment, bit, morsel, crumb" also "bread" | brōt n. | *braudă m. | *braudą n. "cooked food, leavened bread" |
| hier | hair | hair | haar | haar | haar n. | haor | Haar n. | hēr, hǣr n. | hār n. | *hǣră n. | *hērą n. |
| ear | ear | lug | lug | oor | oor n. | oeër | Ohr n. | ēare n. < pre-English *ǣora | ōra n. | *aura < *auza n. | *auzǭ, *ausōn n. |
| doar | door | door | dher | deur | deur f. | dueër | Tür f. | duru f. | turi f. | *duru f. | *durz f. |
| grien | green | green | green | groen | groen | greun | grün | grēne | gruoni | *grōnĭ | *grōniz |
| swiet | sweet | sweet | sweet | soet | zoet | zeut | süß | swēte | s(w)uozi (< *swōti) | *swōtŭ | *swōtuz |
| troch | through | throu | draugh | deur | door | doeër | durch | þurh | duruh | | *þurhw |
| wiet | wet | weet | weate | nat | nat | naat | nass (traditional spelling: naß) | wǣt | naz (< *nat) | *wǣtă / *nată | *wētaz / *nataz |
| each | eye | ee | ei / iee | oog | oog n. | oug | Auge n. | ēage n. < pre-English *ǣoga | ouga n. | *auga n. | *augō n. |
| dream | dream | dream | dreem | droom | droom m. | draum | Traum m. | drēam m. "joy, pleasure, ecstasy, music, song" | troum m. | *draumă m. | *draumaz (< *draugmaz) m. |
| stien | stone | stane | sthoan | steen | steen m. | stein | Stein m. | stān m. | stein m. | *staină m. | *stainaz m. |
| bed | bed | bed | bed | bed | bed n. | bed | Bett n. | bedd n. | betti n. | *baddjă n. | *badją n. |

Other words, with a variety of origins:

| West Frisian | English | Scots | Afrikaans | Dutch | Limburgish | Standard High German | Old English | Old High German | Proto–West Germanic | Proto-Germanic |
|---|---|---|---|---|---|---|---|---|---|---|
| tegearre | together | thegither | saam tesame | samen tezamen | same | zusammen | tōgædere samen tōsamne | saman zisamane | *tōgadura, *tegadura / *tesamane | *tōgadur *samana |
| hynder | horse | pony | perd | paard n. ros n. (dated) | perd ros | Pferd n. / Ross n. (traditional spelling: Roß) | hors n. eoh m. | (h)ros n. / pfarifrit n. / ehu- (in compositions) | *hrussă n. / *ehu m. | *hrussą n., *ehwaz m. |

Note that some of the shown similarities of Frisian and English vis-à-vis Dutch and German are secondary and not due to a closer relationship between them. For example, the plural of the word for "sheep" was originally unchanged in all four languages and still is in some Dutch dialects and a great deal of German dialects. Many other similarities, however, are indeed old inheritances.

== See also ==
- West Germanic Swadesh lists

== Sources ==
- Behaghel, Otto (1922). "Die 2. Pers. Sg. Inf. st. Flexion im Westgermanischen". Indogermanische Forschungen (in German). 40. Berlin: De Gruyter: 167–168. doi:10.1515/if-1922-0117.
- Cercignani, Fausto (1972). "Indo-European ē in Germanic". Zeitschrift für vergleichende Sprachforschung. 86 (1): 104–110.
- Crist, Sean (2002). An Analysis of *z loss in West Germanic (PDF) (Report). Linguistic Society of America, Annual Meeting.
- Davis, Graeme (2006). Comparative Syntax of Old English and Old Icelandic: Linguistic, Literary and Historical Implications. Bern: Peter Lang. ISBN 3-03910-270-2.
- Euler, Wolfram (2013). Das Westgermanische – von der Herausbildung im 3. bis zur Aufgliederung im 7. Jahrhundert – Analyse und Rekonstruktion [West Germanic: From its Emergence in the 3rd Century to its Split in the 7th Century: Analysis and Reconstruction] (in German). London: Verlag Inspiration Un Limited. ISBN 978-3-9812110-7-8. [Later edition]: —— (2022). Das Westgermanische: von der Herausbildung im 3. bis zur Aufgliederung im 7. Jahrhundert – Analyse und Rekonstruktion [West Germanic: from its Emergence in the 3rd up until its Dissolution in the 7th Century CE: Analysis and Reconstruction] (in German) (2nd ed.). Berlin: Verlag Inspiration Unlimited. ISBN 978-3-945127-414.
- Euler, Wolfram; Badenheuer, Konrad (2009). Sprache und Herkunft der Germanen (in German). Hamburg: Verlag Inspiration Un Limited. ISBN 9783981211016. LCCN 2010416379. OCLC 638849539. OL 25023780M.
- Fierlinger, J. v. (1885). Adalbert Kuhn (ed.). "Zur deutschen conjugation. §1. Die II. ps. sg. perf. starker flexion im westgerm. §2. Praesentia der wurzelclasse. §3. Zur westgerm. flexion des verb. subst". Zeitschrift für vergleichende Sprachforschung auf dem Gebiete des Deutschen, Griechischen und Lateinischen | Kuhns Zeitschrift (in German). 27: 430–441.
- Giesbers, C. (2008). Dialecten op de grens van twee talen (in Dutch). Nijmegen: Radboud University.
- Hammarström, Harald; Forkel, Robert; Haspelmath, Martin; Bank, Sebastian (10 July 2023). "Glottolog 4.8 - Irish Anglo-Norman". Glottolog. Leipzig, Germany: Max Planck Institute for Evolutionary Anthropology. doi:10.5281/zenodo.8131084. Archived from the original on 17 July 2023.
- Hartmann, Frederik (2023). 'Germanic Phylogeny. Oxford Studies in Diachronic and Historical Linguistics. Oxford University Press. ISBN 978-0-198-87273-3.
- Hawkins, John A. (1987). "Germanic languages". In Bernard Comrie (ed.). The World's Major Languages. Oxford University Press. pp. 68–76. ISBN 0-19-520521-9.
- Heeringa, W. (2009). Measuring Dialect Pronunciation Differences using Levenshtein Distance. University of Groningen.
- Hickey, Raymond (2002). A Source Book for Irish English. John Benjamins Publishing. ISBN 9027237530.
- Hickey, Raymond (2005). Dublin English: Evolution and Change. John Benjamins Publishing. ISBN 90-272-4895-8.
- Hill, Eugen (2004). "Das germanische Verb für 'tun' und die Ausgänge des germanischen schwachen Präteritums". Sprachwissenschaft. 29 (3): 257–304. ISSN 0344-8169.
- Hirt, Hermann (1932). Handbuch des Urgermanischen [Handbook of Proto-Germanic]. Parts 1–3, in three volumes: 1931–1934 (in German). Vol. 2. Heidelberg: Winters. (Teil 2 [Part 2]).
- Klingenschmitt, Gert (2002). "Zweck und Methode der sprachlichen Rekonstruktion". In Anreiter, Peter (ed.). Name, Sprache, und Kulturen. Festschrift Heinz Dieter Pohl. Wien. pp. 453–474.
- König, Werner (2019). dtv-Atlas Deutsche Sprache (in German) (19th ed.). München: dtv. ISBN 978-3-423-03025-0.
- Kuhn, Hans (1955). "Zur Gliederung der germanischen Sprachen". Zeitschrift für deutsches Altertum und deutsche Literatur (in German). 86 (1): 1–47. JSTOR 20654712. Wikidata Q134384079.
- Löwe, Richard (1906). Kuhn, B.; Schulze, W. (eds.). "Das starke präteritum des Germanischen". Zeitschrift für vergleichende Sprachforschung. 40 (3). Gütersloh: Bertelsmann: 266–352. LCCN 10032846. OCLC 7054927.
- Meid, Wolfgang (1971). Das germanische Praeteritum. Indogermanische Grundlagen und Entfaltung im Germanischen [The Germanic Praeteritum. Indo-European foundations and development in Germanic]. Innsbrucker Beiträge zur Sprachwissenschaft. Innsbruck University. OCLC 363396827. OL 16371146M.
- Meineke, Eckhard; Schwerdt, Judith (2001). Einführung in das Althochdeutsche. Paderborn: Verlag Ferdinand Schöningh. ISBN 3-506-97006-2. OL 12976077M.
- Mottausch, Karl-Heinz (1998). "Die reduplizierenden Verben im Nord- und Westgermanischen: Versuch eines Raum-Zeit-Modells". North-Western European Language Evolution. 33: 43–91. doi:10.1075/nowele.33.03mot.
- Mottausch, Karl-Heinz (2011). Der Nominalakzent im Frühurgermanischen: Konstanten und Neuerungen [The nominal accent in Early Proto-Germanic: Constants and innovations] (in German). Hamburg: Kovač. ISBN 978-3830058335.
- Mottausch, Karl-Heinz (2013). Untersuchungen zur Vorgeschichte des Germanischen Starken Verbs. Die Rolle des Aorists [Investigations into the prehistory of the Germanic strong verb: The role of the aorists] (in German). Verlag Dr. Kovač. ISBN 978-3-8300-6965-2.
- "Nederlands, wereldtaal". Nederlandse Taalunie (in Dutch). 2010. Archived from the original on 21 October 2012.
- Nielsen, Hans F. (1985) [1981]. Old English and the Continental Germanic languages. A Survey of Morphological and Phonological Interrelations (2nd ed.). Innsbruck, Austria: Institut für Sprachwissenschaft.
- Nielsen, Hans Frede (2000). "Ingwäonisch". In Beck, Heinrich (ed.). Reallexikon der Germanischen Altertumskunde. Vol. 15 (2nd ed.). Berlin: De Gruyter. pp. 432–439.
- Polomé, Edgar C. (1964). Lunt, Horace G. (ed.). "Diachronic development of structural patterns in the Germanic conjugation system'". Proceedings of the Ninth International Congress of Linguists. The Hague: 870–880.
- Ringe, Don (2006). From Proto-Indo-European to Proto-Germanic (PDF). A Linguistic History of English series. Vol. 1 (First ed.). Oxford: Oxford University Press. ISBN 978-0199552290.
- Ringe, Donald R. (2012). Cladistic Methodology and West Germanic. Yale Linguistics (Report).
  - See also: —— (2012a). "Cladistic Principles and Linguistic Reality: The Case of West Germanic". In Philomen Probert; Andreas Willi (eds.). Laws and Rules in Indo-European. Oxford: Clarendon Press. pp. 33–42. doi:10.1093/acprof:oso/9780199609925.003.0003. ISBN 978-0-19-960992-5.
- Ringe, Donald R.; Taylor, Ann, eds. (2014). The Development of Old English. A Linguistic History of English series. Vol. 2. Oxford: Oxford University Press. ISBN 978-0199207848.
- Robinson, Orrin W. (1992). Old English and its closest Relatives. A Survey of the earliest Germanic Languages. Stanford: Stanford University Press. ISBN 0-8047-1454-1. LCCN 90024700. OCLC 1150958619. OL 1866584M.
- Seebold, Elmar (1998). Koller, E.; Laitenberger, H. (eds.). "Die Sprache(n) der Germanen in der Zeit der Völkerwanderung" [The Language(s) of the Germanic Peoples during the Migration Period]. Suevos – Schwaben. Das Königreich der Sueben auf der Iberischen Halbinsel (411–585). Tübingen: 11–20.
- Stiles, Patrick V. (January 1985). "The Fate of the Numeral '4' in Germanic (1)". NOWELE. North-Western European Language Evolution. 6 (1): 81–104. doi:10.1075/nowele.6.06sti. ISSN 0108-8416. (Part 1 of 3).
- Stiles, Patrick V. (6 March 2013). "The Pan-West Germanic Isoglosses and the Subrelationships of West Germanic to Other Branches". NOWELE. North-Western European Language Evolution. 66 (1: Unity and Diversity in West Germanic I). John Benjamins Publishing: 5–38. doi:10.1075/nowele.66.1.02sti. ISSN 0108-8416. [Special issue].
- Vasagar, Jeevan (18 June 2013). "German 'should be a working language of EU', says Merkel's party". The Daily Telegraph. Archived from the original on 11 January 2022.
- Wiesinger, Peter (1983). Besch, Werner; Knoop, Ulrich; Putschke, Wolfgang; Wiegand, Herbert Ernst (eds.). "Die Einteilung der deutschen Dialekte". Dialektologie. Ein Handbuch zur Deutschen und Allgemeinen Dialektforschung (in German). 2. Berlin: de Gruyter. doi:10.1515/9783110203332.807. ISBN 3-11-009571-8.
- "Afrikaans speaking countries". Worlddata. October 2023 [April 2015]. Archived from the original on 3 April 2024.
