= Wursten Frisian =

Extinct East Frisian dialect of Germany

- Region: Wursten, today a part of northern Lower Saxony, Germany
- Ethnicity: East Frisians
- Extinct: Early 18th century
- Language family: Indo-European: Germanic; West Germanic; North Sea Germanic; Anglo-Frisian; Frisian; East Frisian; Weser; Wursten Frisian

Language codes
- ISO 639-3: –
- Glottolog: None

Wursten Frisian was a dialect of the East Frisian language that is thought to have been spoken until the early 18th century in the landscape of Wursten between Bremerhaven and Cuxhaven, Germany. Together with Harlingerland Frisian and Wangerooge Frisian it belonged to the Weser Frisian group of dialects. The last East Frisian dialect still spoken today is Saterland Frisian, an Ems-group dialect.

== History ==
The Wursten landscape was not part of the original settling area of the Frisians but was eventually colonised by them in the 8th century AD and became an independent municipality. When the East Frisian language began to fade in the 15th century it was successively replaced by West Low German dialects in the area between the rivers Lauwers and Weser. In Wursten however, the East Frisian language was upheld slightly longer than in East Frisia proper and in Ommelanden, which is now a part of the Netherlands.

At the end of the 17th century the Wursten dialect was described in two lists of words but at the time it had strongly come under pressure. It is believed that in the first half of the 18th century, the Wursten dialect had as well become extinct.

== Linguistic properties ==
The Weser dialects of the East Frisian language were unique among the Germanic languages as they kept full vowels in secondary syllables. This phenomenon was especially distinctive in the Wursten Frisian, the easternmost of the East Frisian dialects. In Old Frisian words with a short stem vowel the accentuation shifted from the first to the second syllable. Thus it could happen that not only the full vowel was preserved in what was now a stressed secondary syllable but the old stem vowel was partially reduced to a total loss. This transition process created words like snuh (son, from Old Frisian sunu) or kma (to come, from Old Fr. koma).

The only preserved full sentence in Wursten Frisian reads: "Kma wit hart ick will di wit tell" [Come here, I want to tell you something].

== Substratum effects ==
Today, there are still some substratum words of Wursten Frisian in the Low German dialect of the Wursten landscape. Århammar lists Maon (socage), Bau(d)n (horse-fly), Schuur/Schuulschotten (dragonfly) and jill'n (to shriek) as examples. Nothing remains however of the phonological characteristics of Wursten Frisian.
