= Nyimang language =

Nilo-Saharan language spoken in Sudan

Nyimang
- Ámá
- Native to: Sudan
- Region: South Kordofan
- Ethnicity: Nyimang
- Native speakers: 170,000 (2022)
- Language family: Nilo-Saharan?: Eastern Sudanic; Northern Eastern; Nyima; Nyimang
- Dialects: Ama; Afunj; Mandal; Tundia
- Writing system: Latin

Language codes
- ISO 639-3: nyi
- Glottolog: amas1236

Nyimang, also known as Ama, is an Eastern Sudanic language spoken in the Nuba Mountains of Sudan by the Nyimang people who are a sub-group of the Nuba people.

It is spoken in Al Fous, Fuony, Hajar Sultan, Kakara, Kalara, Koromiti, Nitil, Salara, Tundia, and other villages (Ethnologue, 22nd edition).

Rilly (2010:182) lists two mutually unintelligible varieties, Ama and Mandal. Blench lists the Mandal dialect separately.

== Phonology ==
=== Consonants ===
		Labial	Dental	Alveolar	Palatal/ Retroflex	Velar
Plosive	voiceless		t̪	t		k
Plosive	voiced	b	d̪	d	ɟ	ɡ
Fricative		f		s	(ʃ)	
Nasal		m		n	ɲ	ŋ
Trill				r	ɽ	
Approximant		w		l	j	

- /s/ is heard as [ʃ] when before front vowels.
- /l/ can be heard as a retroflex [ɭ] when before front vowels.
- /f/ can also be heard as bilabial [ɸ] in free variation.

=== Vowels ===
	Front	Central	Back
Close	i		u
Close-mid	e		o
Open-mid	ɛ		ɔ
Open		a	

- /i, u/ can be heard as [ɪ, ʊ] in lax position.
- /o/ can have an allophone of [ɵ] when in the position of /ɽ/.
