= List of ferry boats of the East Frisian Islands =

The list of the ferries of the East Frisian Islands contains the ferries currently [when?] serving the islands of Borkum, Juist, Norderney, Baltrum, Langeoog, Spiekeroog and Wangerooge. The East Frisian Islands, located between the Wadden Sea and the North Sea in Germany, have been inhabited for centuries by people and have long been a popular holiday region in East Friesland. Traditionally, these ferries serve to transport people and goods, and are a most important link between the mainland and island ports.

== List ==
Picture	Name	Served island	Mainland port	Type of ship	Dimensions	Capacity	Year
	Baltrum I	Baltrum 53°43′23″N 07°21′56″E	Neßmersiel	Seebäderschiff	LOA 45.56 m Width 12.00 m Draft 1.26 m	Pax: 1,000	1977
	Baltrum II	Baltrum 53°43′23″N 07°21′56″E	Neßmersiel	LoLo	LOA 31.24 m Width 6.40 m Draft 2.07 m	Pax: 25; Cargo: 135 t	1966
	Baltrum III	Baltrum 53°43′23″N 07°21′56″E	Neßmersiel	Seebäderschiff	LOA 33.50 m Width 7.00 m Draft 0.96 m	Pax: 375	1971
	Baltrum IV	Baltrum 53°43′23″N 07°21′56″E	Neßmersiel	Inspection boat	LOA 15.44 m Width 4.30 m Draft 0.58 m	Pax: 25	1982
	Frisia I	Norderney 53°41′52″N 07°9′56″E	Norddeich Mole	RoPax	LOA 63.70 m Width 12.00 m Draft 1.80 m	Pax: 800; Cars: 52	1970
	Frisia II	Juist 53°40′25″N 06°59′46″E Norderney	Norddeich Mole	RoPax	LOA 63.30 m Width 12.00 m Draft 1.25 m	Pax: 1,350; Cars: 55	1978
	Frisia III	Norderney 53°41′52″N 07°9′56″E	Norddeich Mole	RoPax	LOA 74.35 m Width 13.40 m Draft 1.83 m	Pax:1,338; Cars:60	2015
	Frisia IV	Norderney 53°41′52″N 07°9′56″E	Norddeich Mole	RoPax	LOAl 70.07 m Width 13.70 m Draft 1.75 m	Pax: 1,350; Cars: 58	2001
	Frisia V	Norderney 53°41′52″N 07°9′56″E	Norddeich Mole	RoPax	LOA 63.80 m Width 12.00 m Draft 1.80 m	Pax: 1,450; Cars: 52	1965
	Frisia VI	Norderney 53°41′52″N 07°9′56″E Juist 53°40′25″N 06°59′46″E	Norddeich Mole	RoPax	LOA 54.90 m Width 10.90 m Draft 1.45 m	Pax: 1,100; Cars: 42	1965
	Frisia VII	Juist 53°40′25″N 06°59′46″E Norderney 53°41′52″N 07°9′56″E	Norddeich Mole	RoPax	LOA 53.00 m Width 9.50 m Draft 1.43 m	Pax: 13; RoRo 121 m Cargo 300 t	1984
	Frisia IX	Juist 53°40′25″N 06°59′46″E Norderney 53°41′52″N 07°9′56″E	Norddeich Mole	Seebäderschiff	LOA 57.10 m Width 8.90 m Draft 1.15 m	Pax: 785	1980
	Frisia X	Juist 53°40′25″N 06°59′46″E Norderney 53°41′52″N 07°9′56″E	Norddeich Mole	Seebäderschiff	LOA 36.30 m Width 7.30 m Draft 1.0 m	Pax: 290	1972
Rüm Hart under conversion to Frisia XI at Diedrich shipyard	Frisia XI	Juist 53°40′25″N 06°59′46″E Norderney 53°41′52″N 07°9′56″E	Norddeich Mole	Seebäderschiff	LOA 35.36 m Width 7.00 m Draft 1.0 m	Pax: 375	1969
	Groningerland	Borkum 53°33′48″N 06°45′35″E	Eemshaven Emden	RoPax	LOA 44.70 m Width 12.80 m Draft 1.95 m	Pax: 623; Cars: 28	1991
	Harle Gatt	Wangerooge 53°46′26″N 07°52′00″E	Harlesiel	RoRo	LOA 45.65 m Width 10.14 m Draft 1.40 m	Pax: 0 RoRo: 60 m	1999
	Harle Riff	Wangerooge 53°46′26″N 07°52′00″E Spiekeroog 53°45′54″N 07°41′48″E	Harlesiel	RoRo	LOA 26.00 m Width 7.16 m Draft 1.54 m	Pax: 0 RoRo: 32 m	1959
	Harle Sand	Wangerooge 53°46′26″N 07°52′00″E	Harlesiel	Seebäderschiff	LOA 29.50 m Width 5.20 m Draft 0.95 m	Pax: 200	1972
	Harlingerland	Wangerooge 53°46′26″N 07°52′00″E	Harlesiel	Seebäderschiff	LOA 46.50 m Width 8.50 m Draft 1.41 m	Pax: 635	1979
	Helgoland	Borkum 53°33′48″N 06°45′35″E	Emden Eemshaven	RoPax	LOA 75.34 m Width 12.60 m Draft 2.41 m	Pax: 1,200; Cars: 70	1972
	Langeoog I	Langeoog 53.725167°N 7.497171°E	Bensersiel	Seebäderschiff	LOA 33.53 m Width 7.20 m Draft 1.10 m	Pax: 350	1968
	Langeoog II	Langeoog 53.725167°N 7.497171°E	Bensersiel	Seebäderschiff	LOA 33.29 m Width 7.40 m Draft 1.15 m	Pax: 260	1991
	Langeoog III	Langeoog 53.725167°N 7.497171°E	Bensersiel	Seebäderschiff	LOA 45.88 m Width 10.60 m Draft 1.32 m	Pax: 800	1979
	Langeoog IV	Langeoog 53.725167°N 7.497171°E	Bensersiel	Seebäderschiff	LOA 45.88 m Width 10.60 m Draft 1.32 m	Pax: 800	1979
	Münsterland	Borkum 53°33′48″N 06°45′35″E	Emden Eemshaven	RoPax	LOA 78.70 m Width 12.60 m Draft 2.59 m	Pax: 1,200; Cars: 70	1985
	Nordlicht	Borkum 53°33′48″N 06°45′35″E	Emden	HSC	LOA 38.87 m Width 9.44 m Draft 1.60 m	Pax: 272	1989
	Onkel Otto	Langeoog 53.725167°N 7.497171°E	Bensersiel	RoRo	LOA 37.50 m Width 7.20 m Draft 1.20 m	Pax: 0 RoRo: 34 m	1960
	Ostfriesland	Borkum 53°33′48″N 06°45′35″E	Emden Eemshaven	RoPax	LOA 78.70 m Width 12.60 m Draft 2.56 m	Pax: 1,200; Cars: 70	1985
	Pionier	Langeoog 53.725167°N 7.497171°E	Bensersiel	RoRo	LOA 37.20 m Width 7.01 m Draft 1.20 m	Pax: 0 RoRo: 34 m	1952
	Spiekeroog I	Spiekeroog 53°45′54″N 07°41′48″E	Neuharlingersiel	Seebäderschiff	LOA 46.75 m Width 10.00 m Draft 1.31 m	Pax: 750; Luggage: 18 × 4.7 m^{3}	1981
	Spiekeroog II	Spiekeroog 53°45′54″N 07°41′48″E	Neuharlingersiel	Seebäderschiff	LOA 47.90 m Width 9.00 m Draft 1.45 m	Pax: 700; Luggage: 12 × 4.7 m^{3}	1981
	Spiekeroog IV	Spiekeroog 53°45′54″N 07°41′48″E	Neuharlingersiel	RoPax	LOA 45.50 m Width 10.40 m Draft 1.55 m	Pax: 260; Cargo: 8 × 13.7 t	1979
	Wangerooge	Wangerooge 53°46′26″N 07°52′00″E	Harlesiel	Seebäderschiff	LOA 45.30 m Width 10.00 m Draft 1.28 m	Pax: 760	1985
	Wappen von Borkum	Borkum 53°33′48″N 06°45′35″E	Emden Knock Delfzijl Eemshaven	Seebäderschiff	LOA 42.67 m Width 7.28 m Draft 1.06 m	Pax: 358	1976

== See also ==
- List of Spiekeroog ferry vessels
