= Harle (river) =

River in Germany

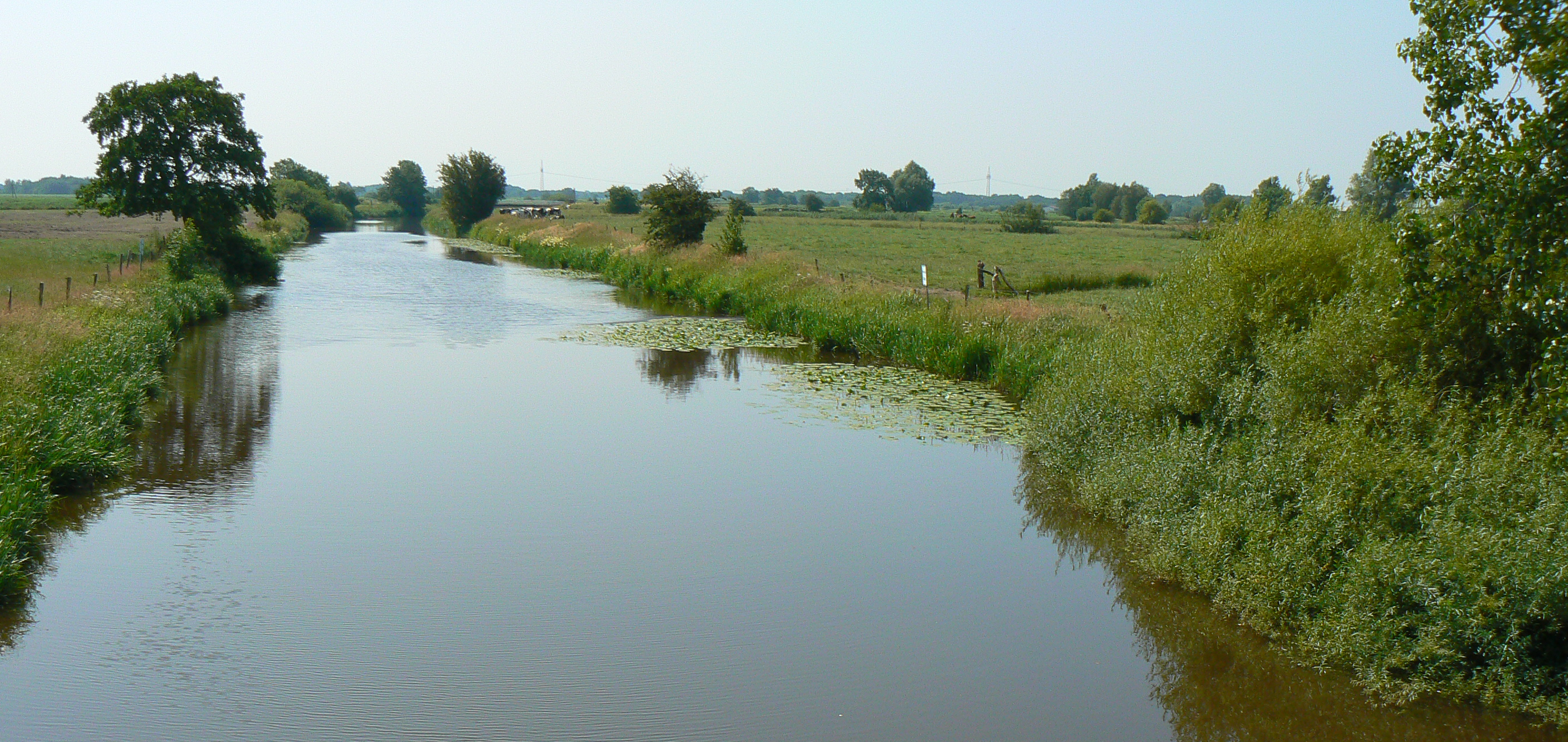
- The Harle near Wittmund

Location
- Country: Germany
- State: Lower Saxony

Physical characteristics
- Mouth
  - location: North Sea
  - coordinates: 53.7°N 7.82°E
- Length: 35.7 km (22.2 mi)
- Basin size: 198 km^{2} (76 sq mi)

The Harle (in its upper course: Norder Tief) is a river of Lower Saxony, Germany, in the district of Wittmund in East Frisia.

Its entire course is within the borough of Wittmund and it discharges near Harlesiel through a Siel, a sluice in the dyke, into the North Sea. Near the village of Willen two headstreams Nordertief and Südertief join forming the Harle. Both tributaries are streams that originate in bogland depressions in the neighbouring borough of Aurich.

The Harle runs eastwards past the town of Wittmund and then flows in meanders in a northerly direction. It passes Carolinensiel and discharges through a lock and a scoop wheel into Harlesiel Harbour and from there into the North Sea.

The Harle is popular with tourists for rowing and, in the harbours of Carolinensiel and Harlesiel, for boats and ferries. Harlesiel is a ferry port for trips to the island of Wangerooge.

== See also ==
- List of rivers of Lower Saxony
