= Wangerooge Airfield =

Airfield serving Wangerooge island, Lower Saxony, Germany

Wangerooge Airfield Flugplatz Wangerooge
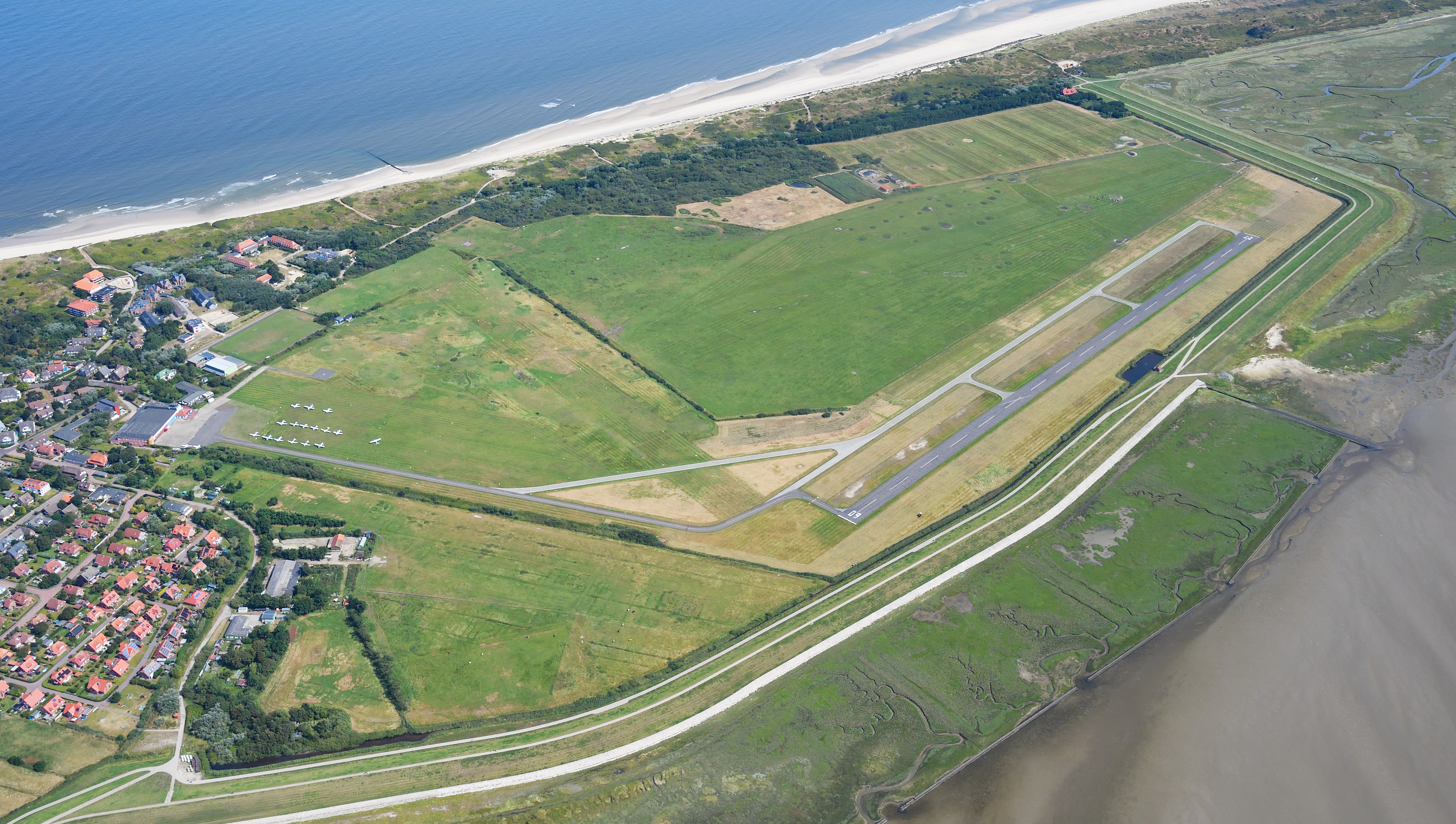
- IATA: AGE; ICAO: EDWG

Summary
- Location: Wangerooge, Germany
- Elevation AMSL: 6 ft / 2 m
- Coordinates: 53°47′0″N 7°55′0″E
- Interactive map of Wangerooge Airfield

Runways
Direction	Length		Surface
Direction	ft	m	Surface
10/28		850	asphalt

Wangerooge Airfield, German: Flugplatz Wangerooge (IATA: AGE, ICAO: EDWG), is a small airfield on Wangerooge, one of the East Frisian Islands and a municipality of Lower Saxony, Germany.

== Airlines and destinations ==
The following airlines offer regular scheduled and charter flights at Wangerooge Airfield:

Airlines	Destinations
FLN Frisia Luftverkehr	Harle
