= Wangerooge =

- Municipality
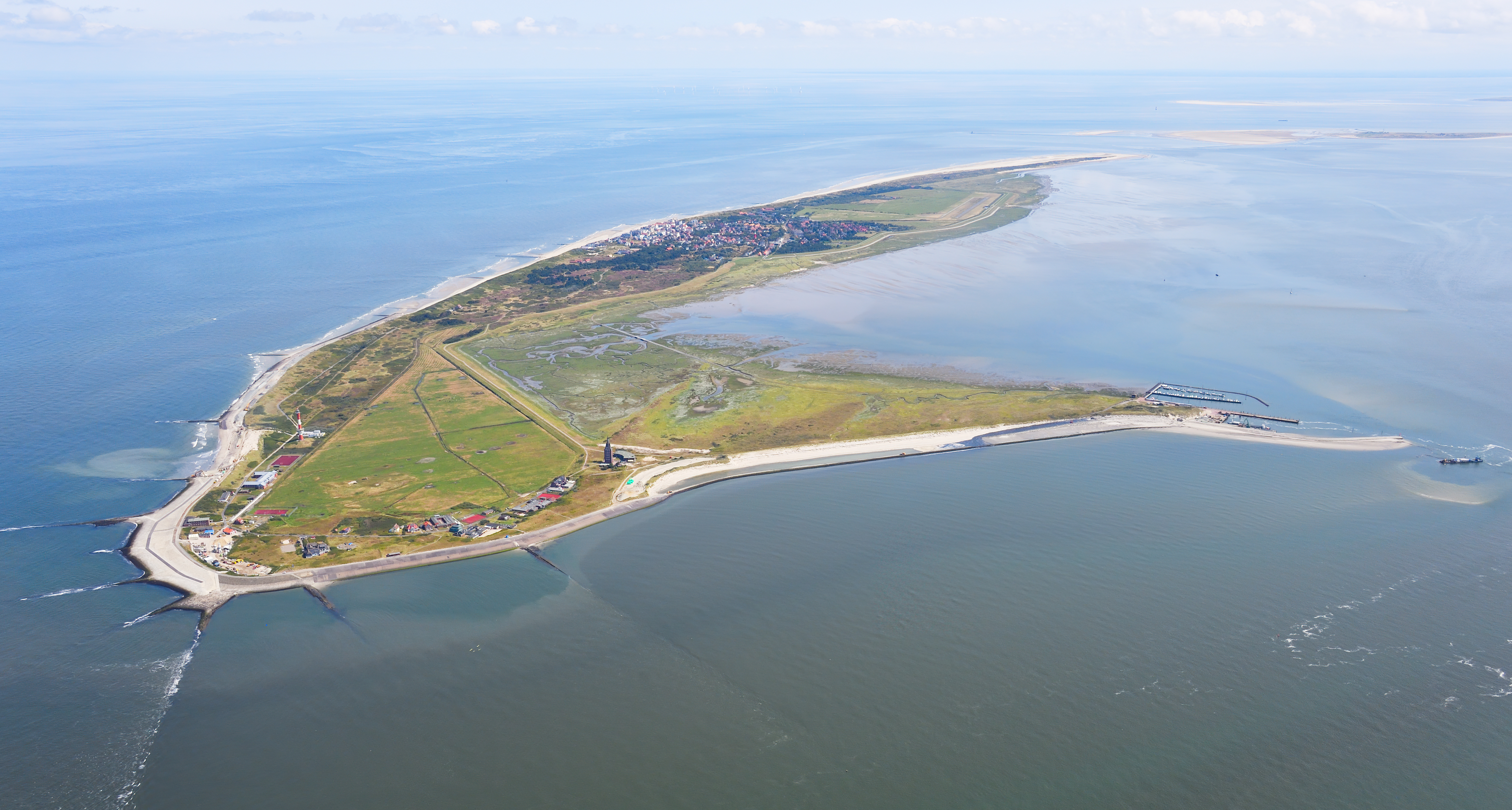
- Aerial view of Wangerooge from the west

- Flag Coat of arms

- Location of Wangerooge within Friesland district
- Interactive map of Wangerooge
- Location within Germany Location within Lower Saxony
- Coordinates: 53°47′27″N 7°53′57″E
- Country: Germany
- State: Lower Saxony
- District: Friesland

Government
  - Mayor (2018–23): Marcel Fangohr (CDU)

Area
  - Total: 4.97 km^{2} (1.92 sq mi)
- Elevation: 1–17 m (3.3–55.8 ft)

Population (2025-12-31)
  - Total: 1,048
  - Density: 211/km^{2} (546/sq mi)
- Time zone: UTC+01:00 (CET)
  - Summer (DST): UTC+02:00 (CEST)
- Postal codes: 26486
- Dialling codes: 04469
- Vehicle registration: FRI
- Website: wangerooge.de; gemeinde-wangerooge.de

Wangerooge (German: [vaŋɐˈʔoːɡə]; Low German: Wangeroog; Wangerooge Frisian: Wangeróoch) is one of the 32 Frisian Islands in the North Sea off the northwestern coast of Germany. It is a municipality in the district of Friesland in Lower Saxony in Germany. The island is also located close to the coasts of the Netherlands and Denmark.

Wangerooge is one of the East Frisian Islands. It is the easternmost and smallest of the inhabited islands in this group (according to some other measurements, Baltrum is the smallest) and the only one that belonged to the historical Grand Duchy and Free State of Oldenburg between 1815 and 1947, whereas Borkum, Juist, Norderney, Baltrum, Langeoog and Spiekeroog always belonged to the county of Ostfriesland. As of the census of 2004, the island has 1,055 inhabitants. Especially in summer the island accommodates more than 7,000 visitors a day.

Wangerooge is separated from the island of Spiekeroog by a gat known as the Harle.

The island is attractive to tourists due to the beaches, various recreation facilities and its relaxed atmosphere. The island's slogan, visible on a sign at the harbor, emphasizes this: "God created time, but he never mentioned haste." A yearly beach volleyball tournament, usually held at the beginning of August, is one of the main attractions in the summer, and has served to modify the general impression that the island is exclusively attractive to older people and young families. In addition, windsurfing, kite-surfing and board-riding activities attract younger people.

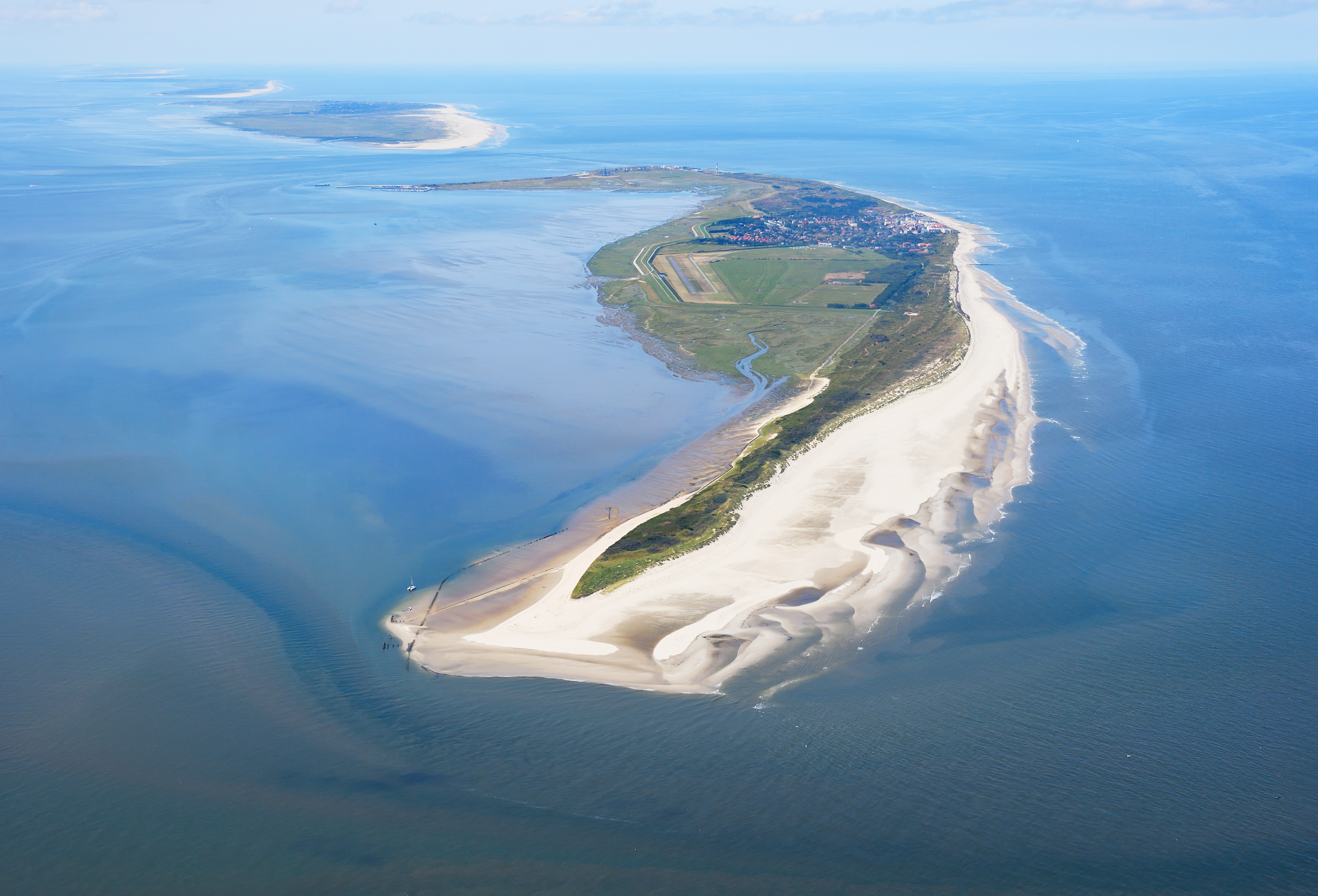
Aerial view of Wangerooge from the east

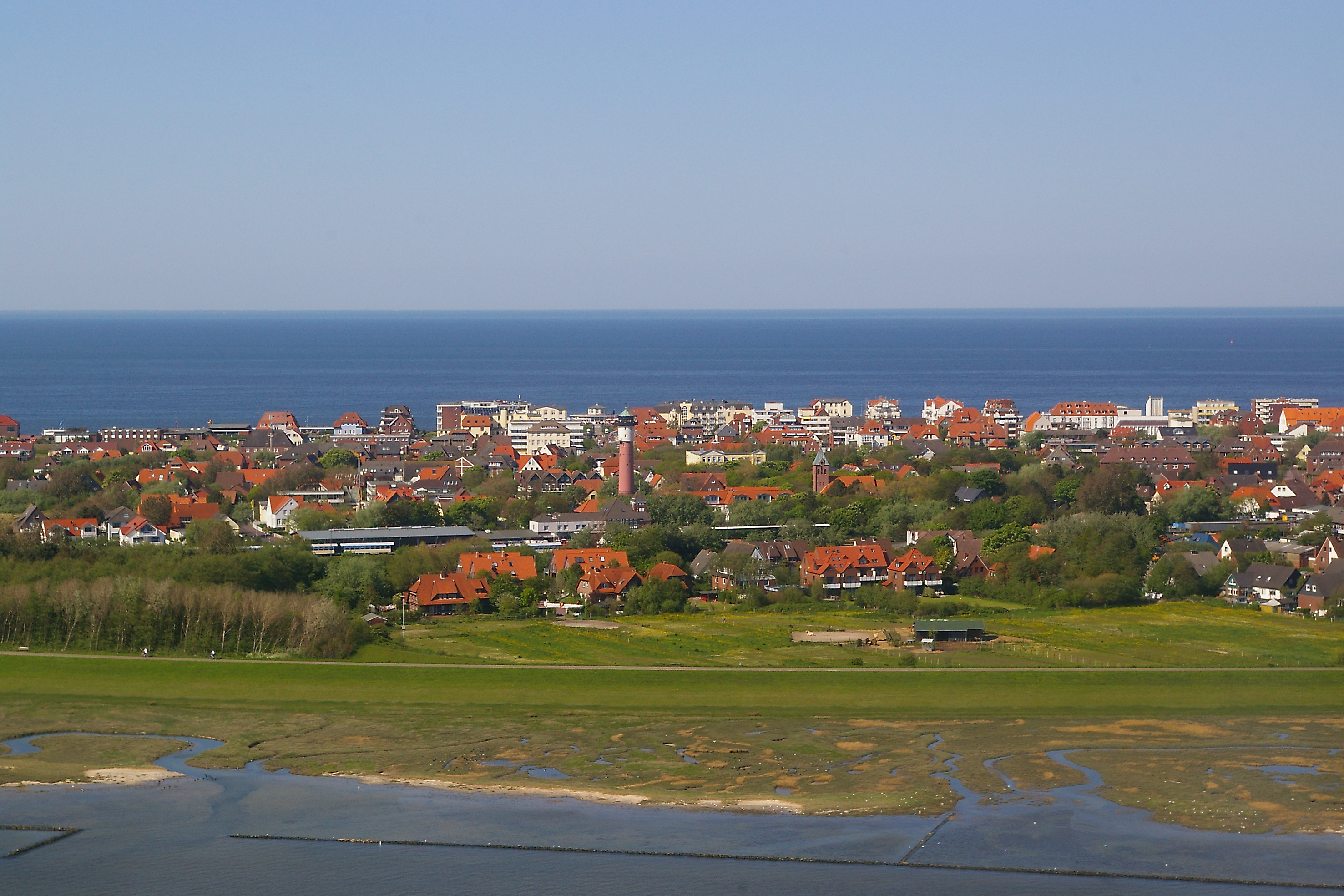
Wangerooge from the air, approaching the island from the south

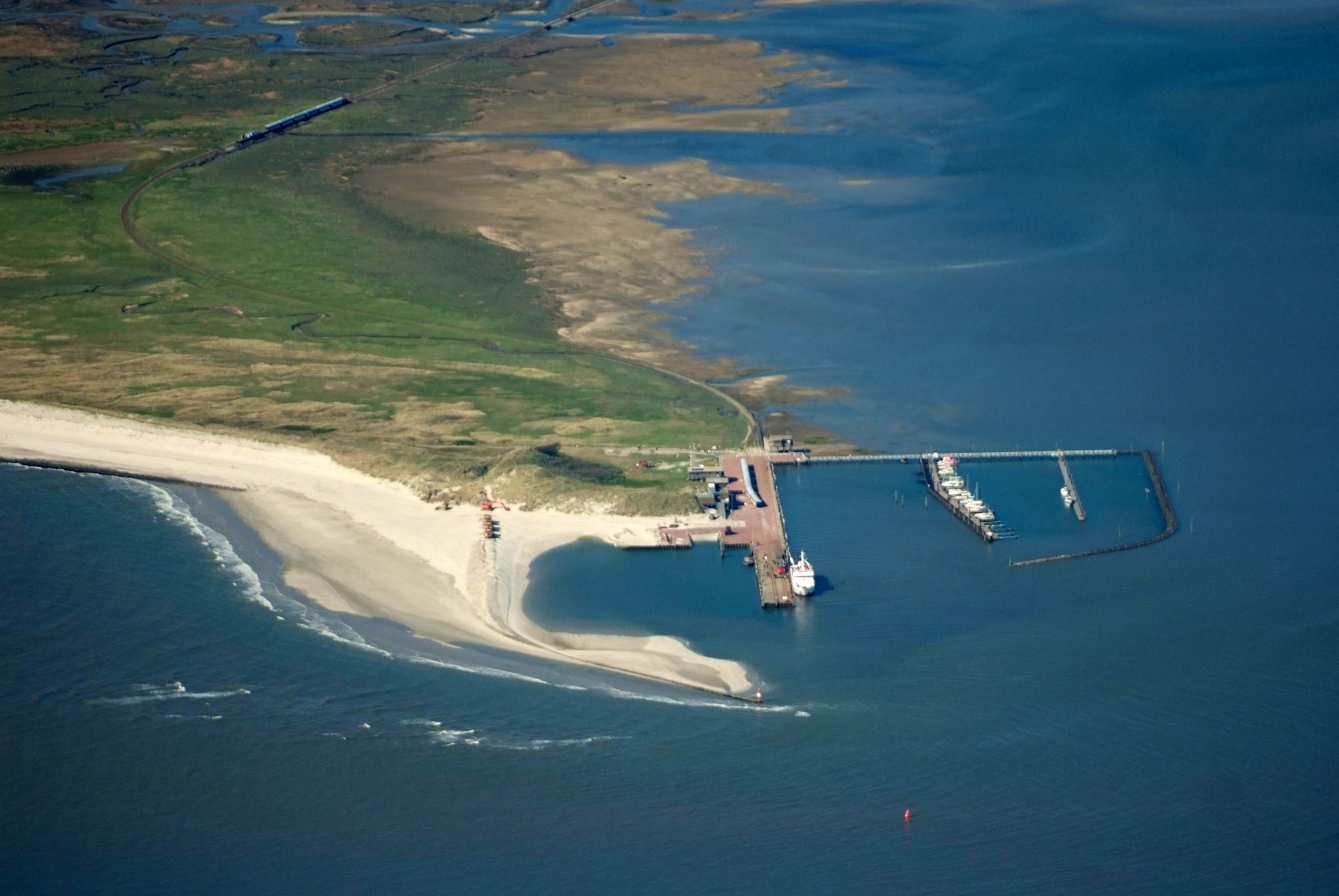
The port of Wangerooge

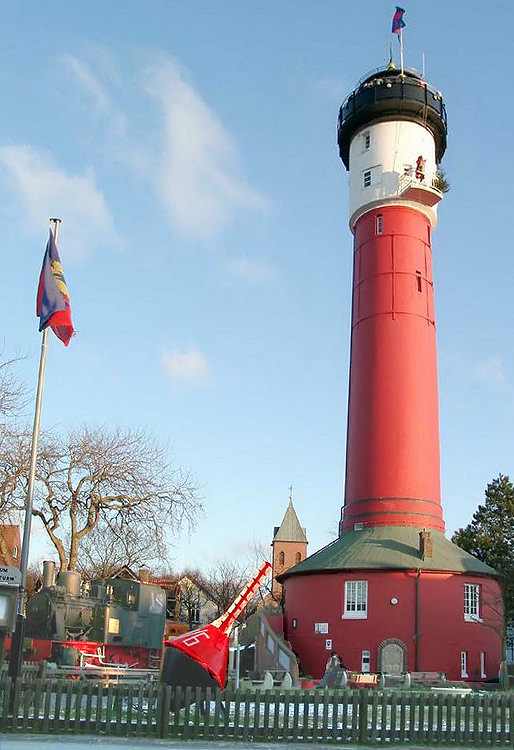
Old Lighthouse

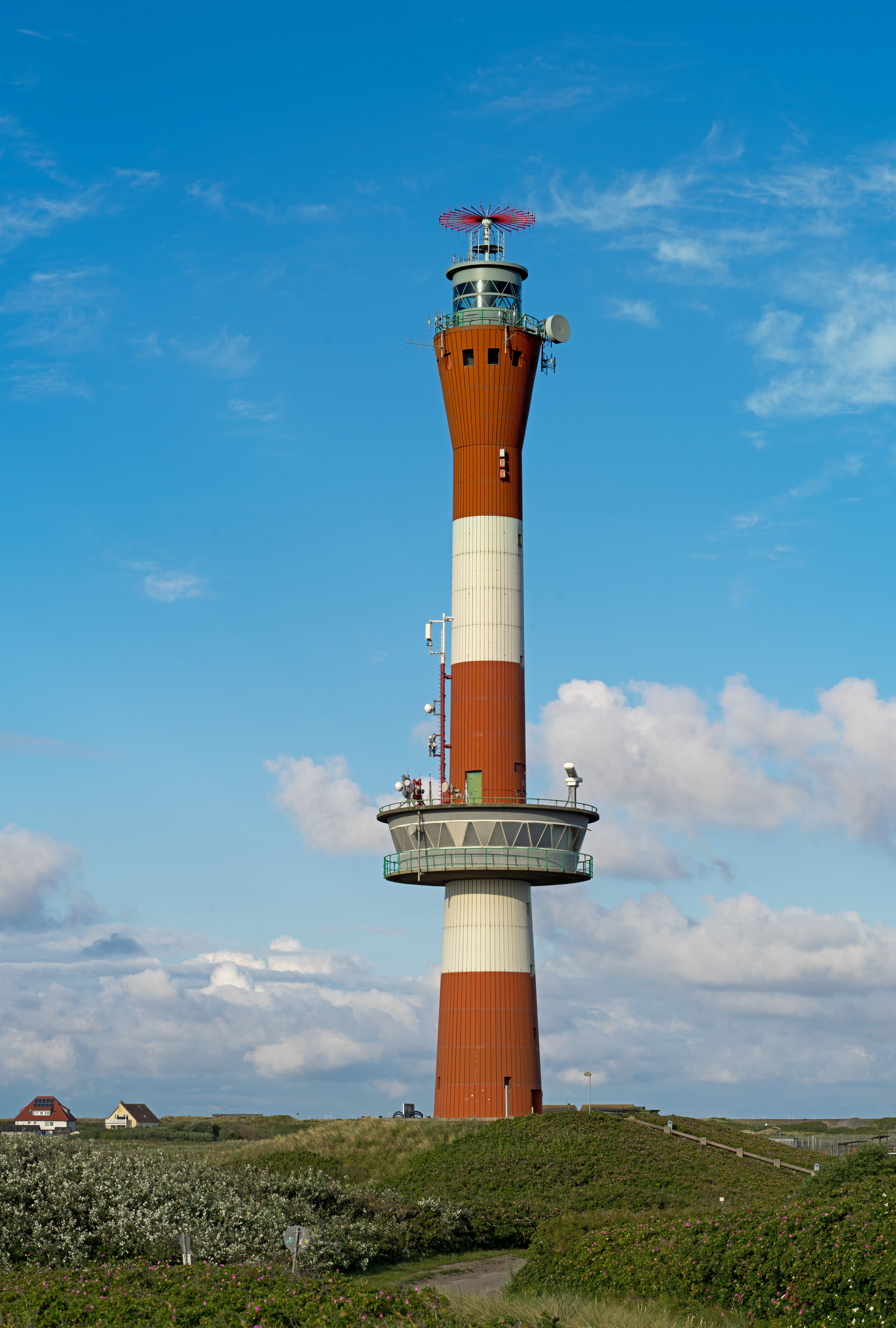
New Lighthouse

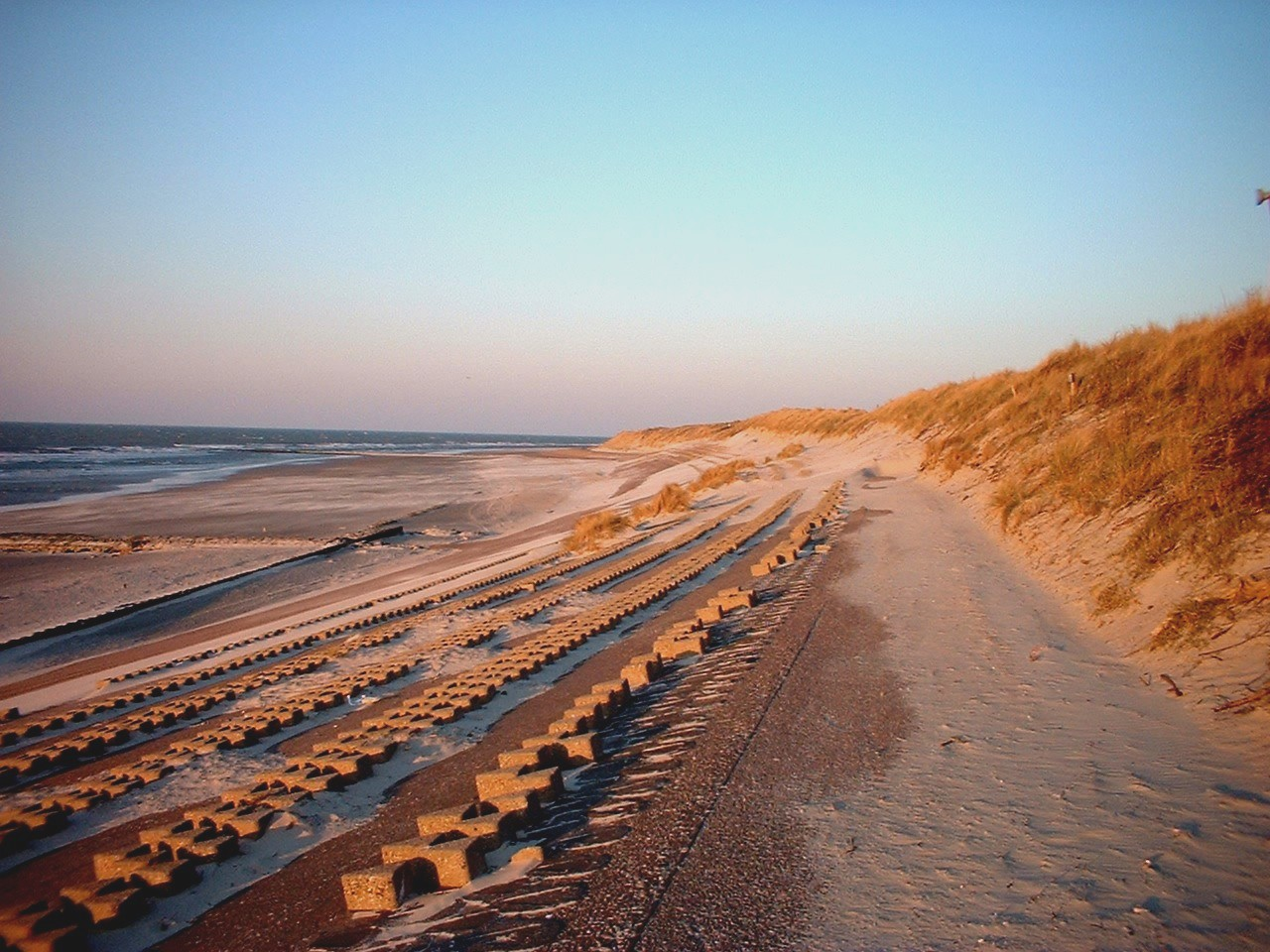
Beach and dike of Wangerooge

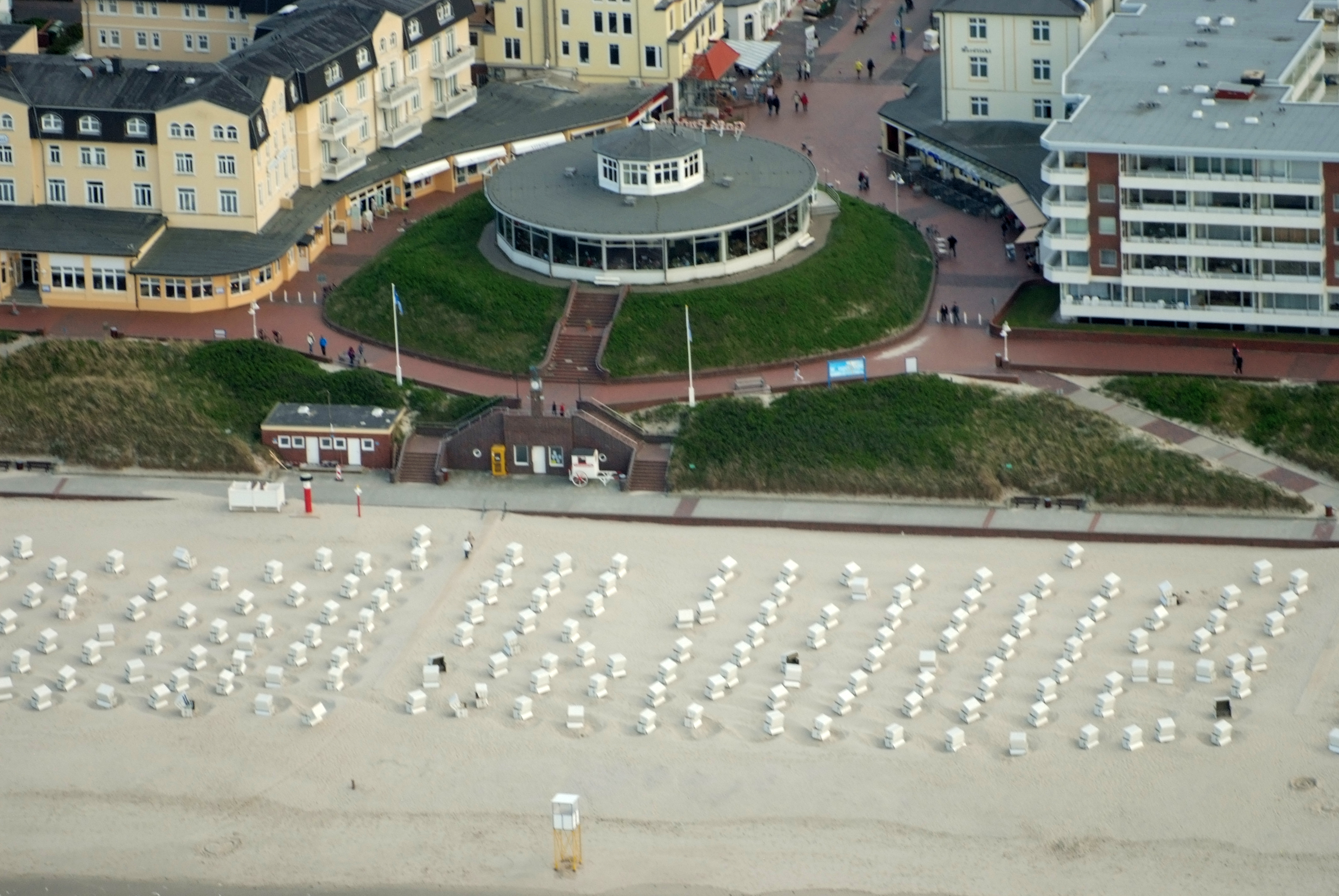
Café Pudding

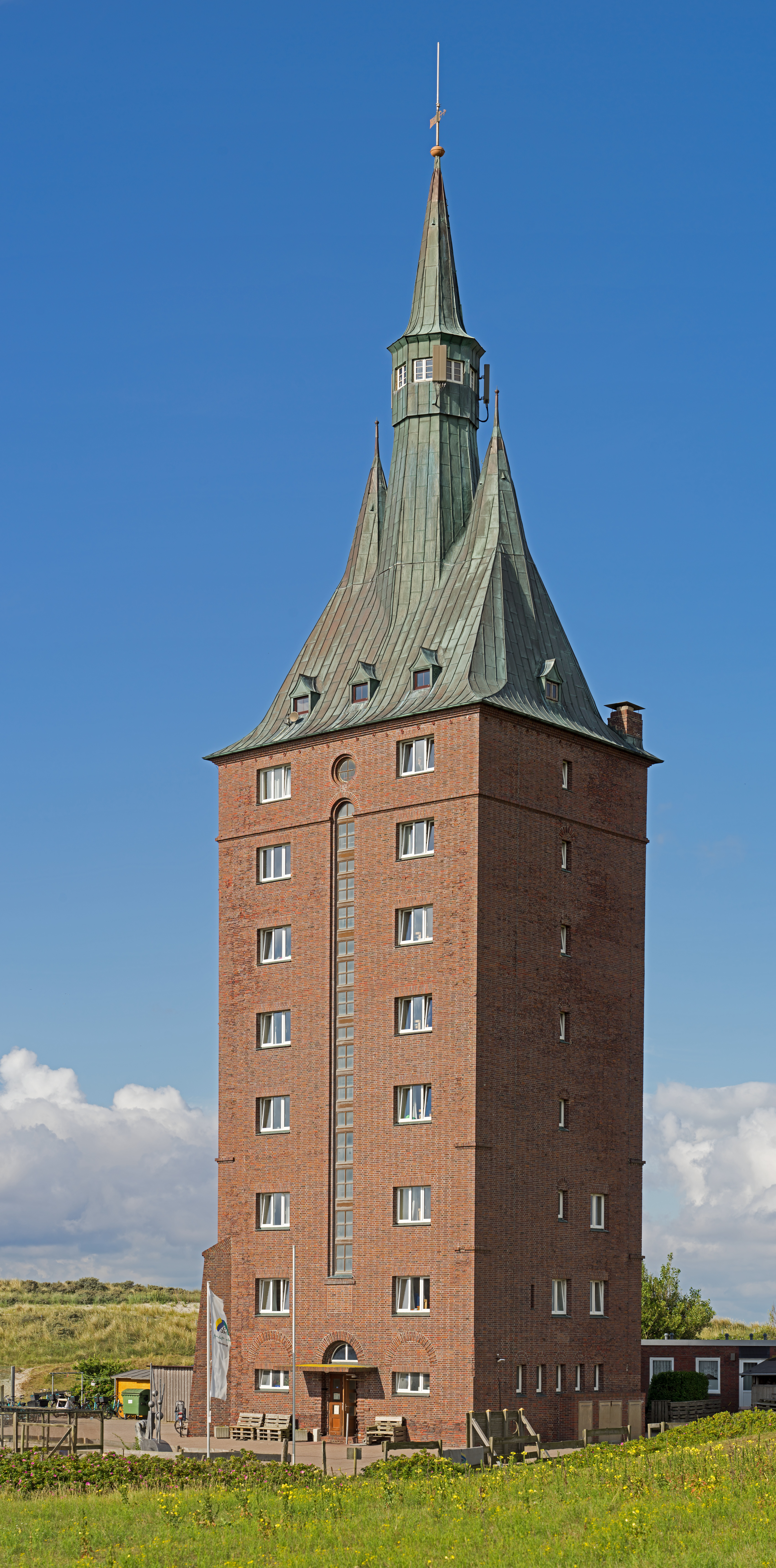
Westturm,

In order to guarantee a relaxed atmosphere, cars are prohibited on the island. The island can be reached by ship from Harlesiel, or it can be reached by plane via its airfield, regular service being offered from Harlesiel, Bremen, or Hamburg. The ferries leave at different times every day according to the tide. As on most East Frisian Islands, a small narrow gauge railway line, the Wangerooge Island Railway, connects the harbor to the main village, with the total track length of 5.9 km (3.7 mi).

As for historical sites and other places of interest, the island has one active lighthouse, one old lighthouse, and the Western Tower. Since the whole island used to be shifting constantly eastwards until sea defenses were built a century ago, old buildings were gradually lost to the sea.' The Western Tower was built in 1597 and was originally in the east of the island.

Wangerooge is also known as the site of a historic World War II B-17 Flying Fortress crash, or rather a double crash. During a bombing mission on Hamburg on New Year's Eve, 1944, a B-17 squadron was attacked by German fighter planes on its homeward flight. While in tight formation, one plane was shot down and became entangled with the plane below it. One of the pilots managed to take control of the two aircraft and steer them back towards the German coast for an emergency landing. At the time, the two entangled aircraft were described as resembling breeding dragonflies as the ball turrets of each plane were caught in the chassis of the other. Most of the crew bailed out, while two remained and successfully made a crash landing in a field.

Wangerooge has an airfield with scheduled services.

Location of Wangerooge in Friesland district

== Geography ==
=== Location ===
Wangerooge is a German island in the southern North Sea and is the easternmost of the seven inhabited East Frisian islands. The island stretches over 8.5 kilometers in length in the east-west direction. The north-south extension is a maximum of 2.2 kilometers in the western part, and 1.2 kilometers at the level of the village. The distance to the mainland is 7 kilometers. To the west of Wangerooge, which is separated by the Gat of Harle, the eastern Spiekeroog is 2 kilometers away. Separated by the Blaue Balje, the island Minsener Oog begins, which is 2 kilometers east-southeast. On the northside, there is a sandy beach that is about 100 meters wide and 3 kilometers long. In the east, this beach merges into a 500 meter wide and 3 kilometer long field with sand deposits. In the west of the island, there are two more beaches that are ½ kilometer and 1 kilometer in length. To the south of the island lies the Wadden Sea, which is part of the Lower Saxon Wadden Sea National Park, like the islands, and is very dry at Baseflow. Below the island, at a depth of about 15 meters, there is the Geest base. The highest elevation of the island is the look-out dune, which is 17 meters above sea level. The remaining sand dunes reach heights of up to 12 meters.

=== Area ===
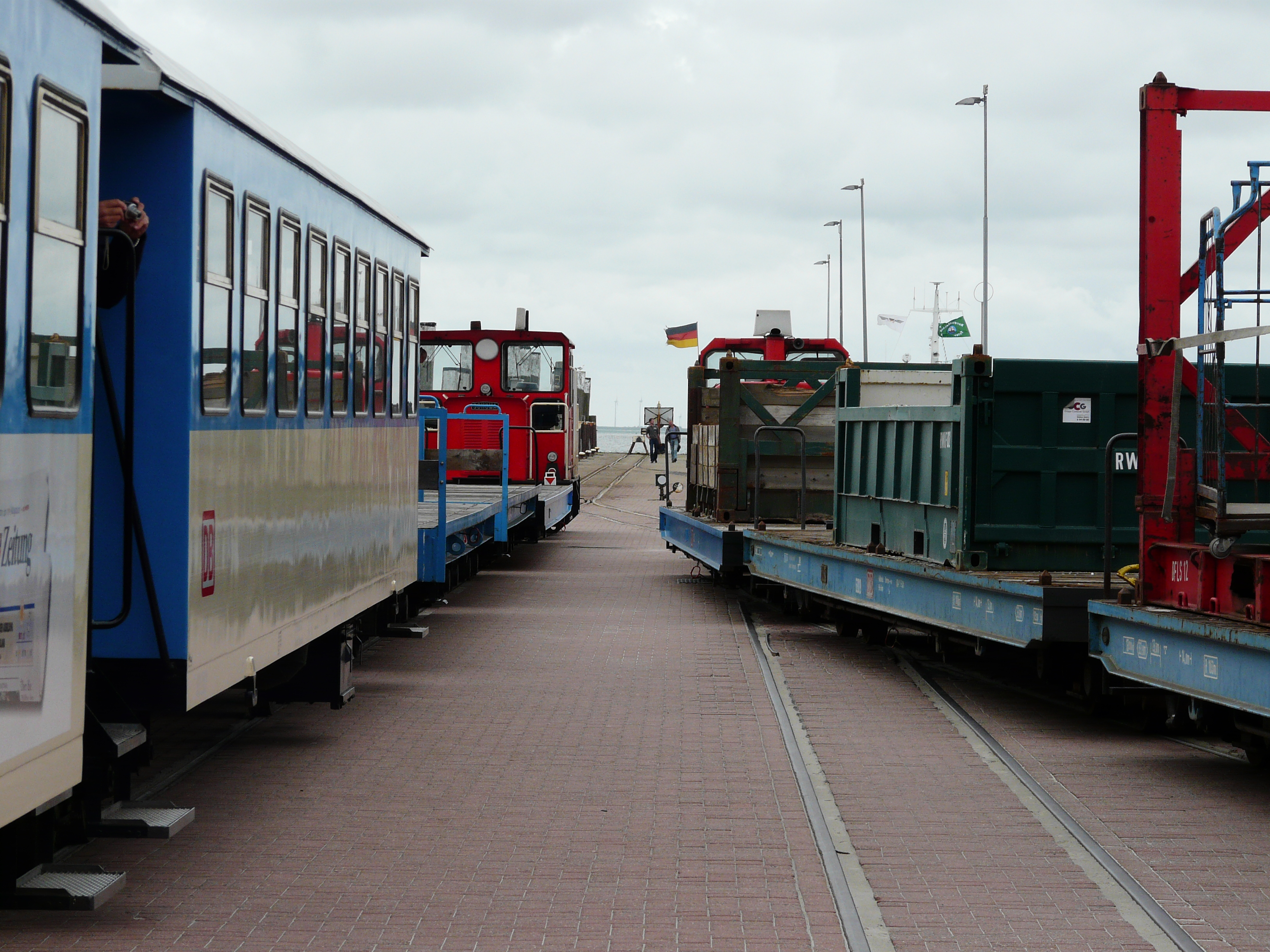
The Wangerooge island railway at the port

With an area of 7.94 square kilometers (2008), Wangerooge is the second smallest of the inhabited East Frisian islands after Baltrum, and the larger areas can be up to 8.5 square kilometers. Higher values include beach areas that lie below the mean tide line (Mittleres Tidehochwasser, MTHW), but these are regularly washed over by the sea water of the North Sea and are, therefore, not considered as land areas. Since part of the land area, about 2.97 square kilometers, is not municipalized as a part of a federal waterway, the area of the municipality of Wangerooge covers only 4.97 square kilometers.

== Leisure activities ==
The range of leisure activities is largely shaped by the natural environment. Along the kilometers-long sandy beach, Strandkörbe (hooded beach chairs) can be rented near the island village. Guided mudflat hikes are also offered. Various spa facilities, such as the Haus des Kurgastes ("House of the Spa Guest"), the spa treatment center, and the Haus des kleinen Kurgastes ("House of the Little Spa Guest"), were established as early as the 1960s. Since 1984, the tourist infrastructure has included a seawater indoor swimming pool. The village square and the rose garden in the town center are well-maintained parks. The National Park House, located there, serves as a local information and education center on nature conservation. A great view of the area can be enjoyed from the Old Lighthouse, which also houses the Island Museum. Recreational facilities include a tennis court, a tennis and squash hall, a surfing school, a sports field, and a golf course. A riding stable offers horseback riding through the dunes and along the beach. From the harbor, boat excursions to neighboring islands and seal banks are available. There is also a cinema on the island.

The island features several youth, children's, and rural school homes, as well as mother-and-child spa facilities. In 2009, a beach club with a disco was established in the former school camp of the Oldenburger Jugend-Erholungswerk (Oldenburg Youth Recreation Association).

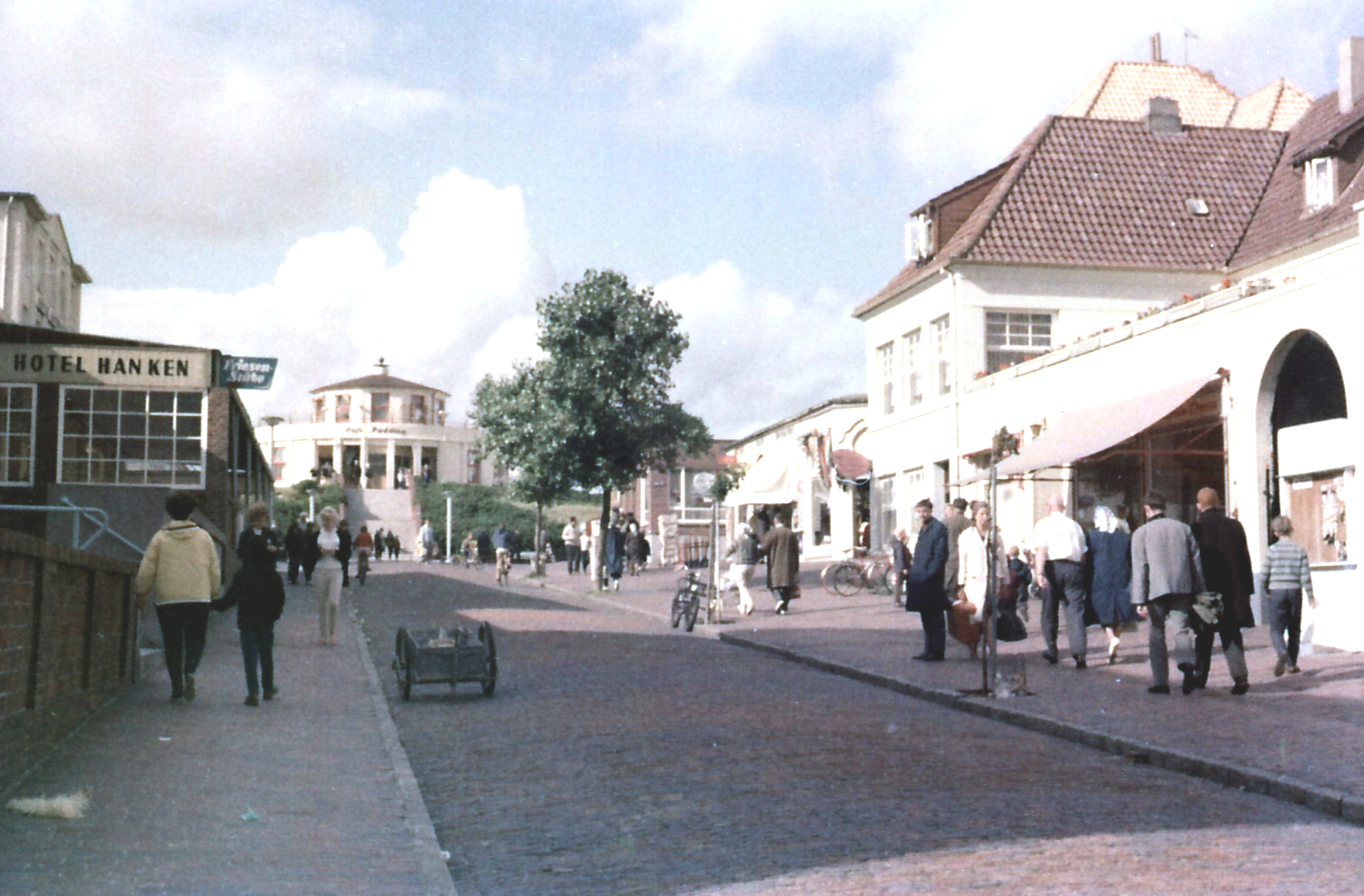
Zedeliusstraße, 1964

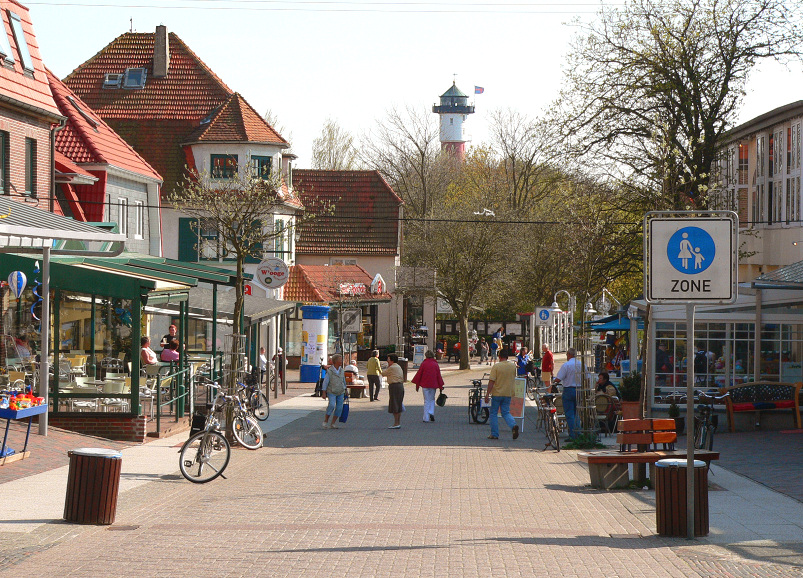
View from the beach into the pedestrian zone of Zedeliusstraße

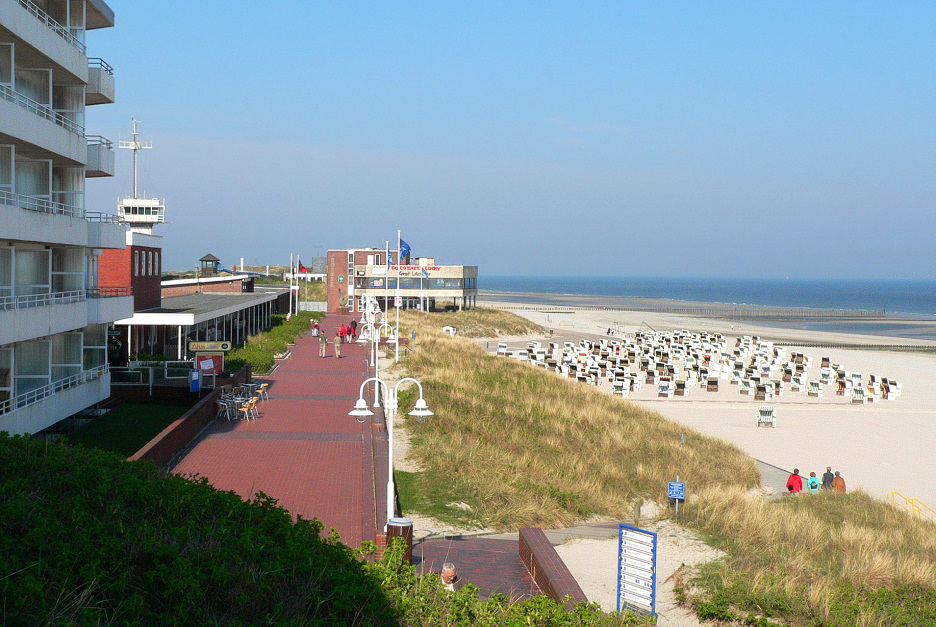
a view of the beach promenade

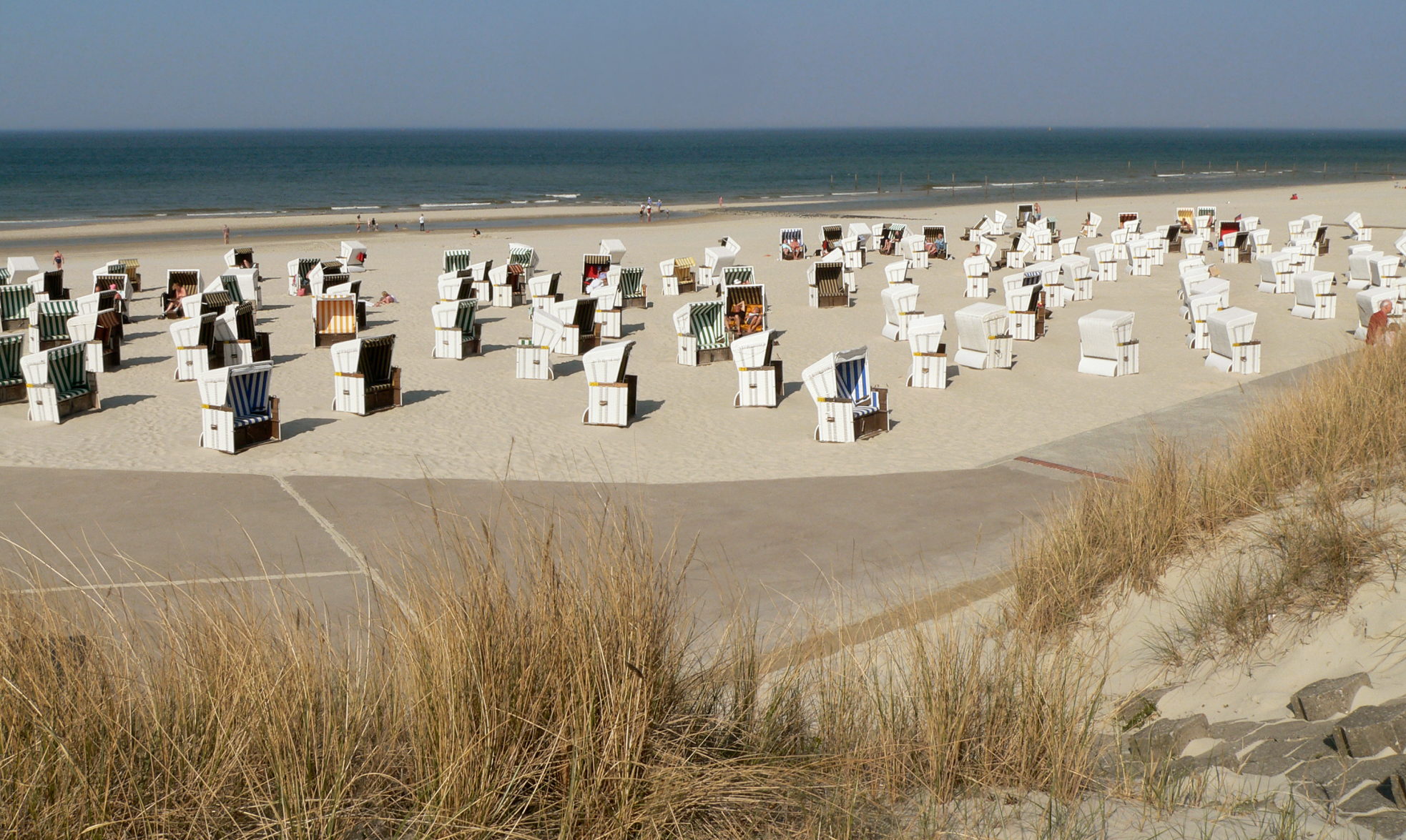
Main beach with Strandkörbe

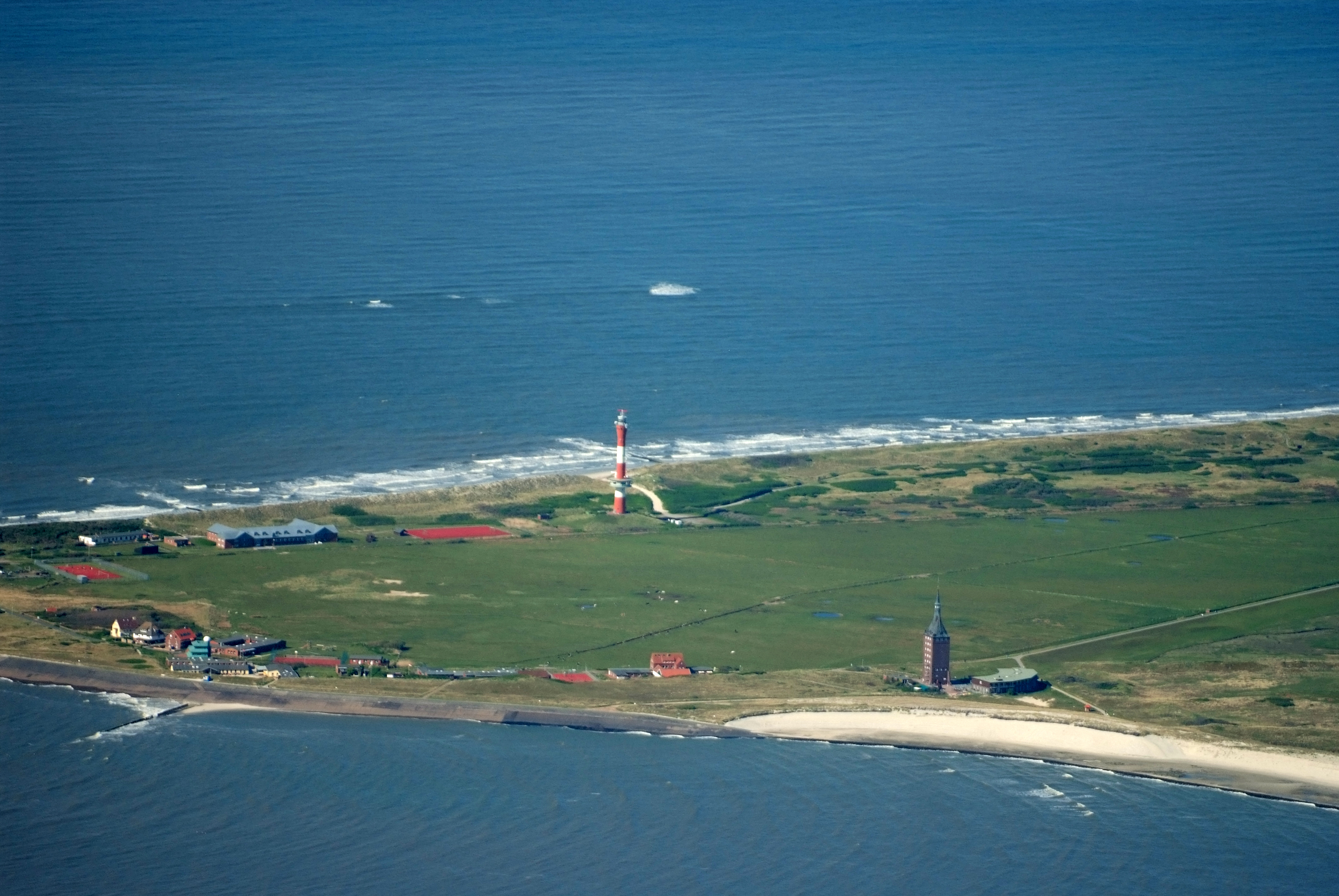
West of the island with the new lighthouse, the new west tower and the youth hostel

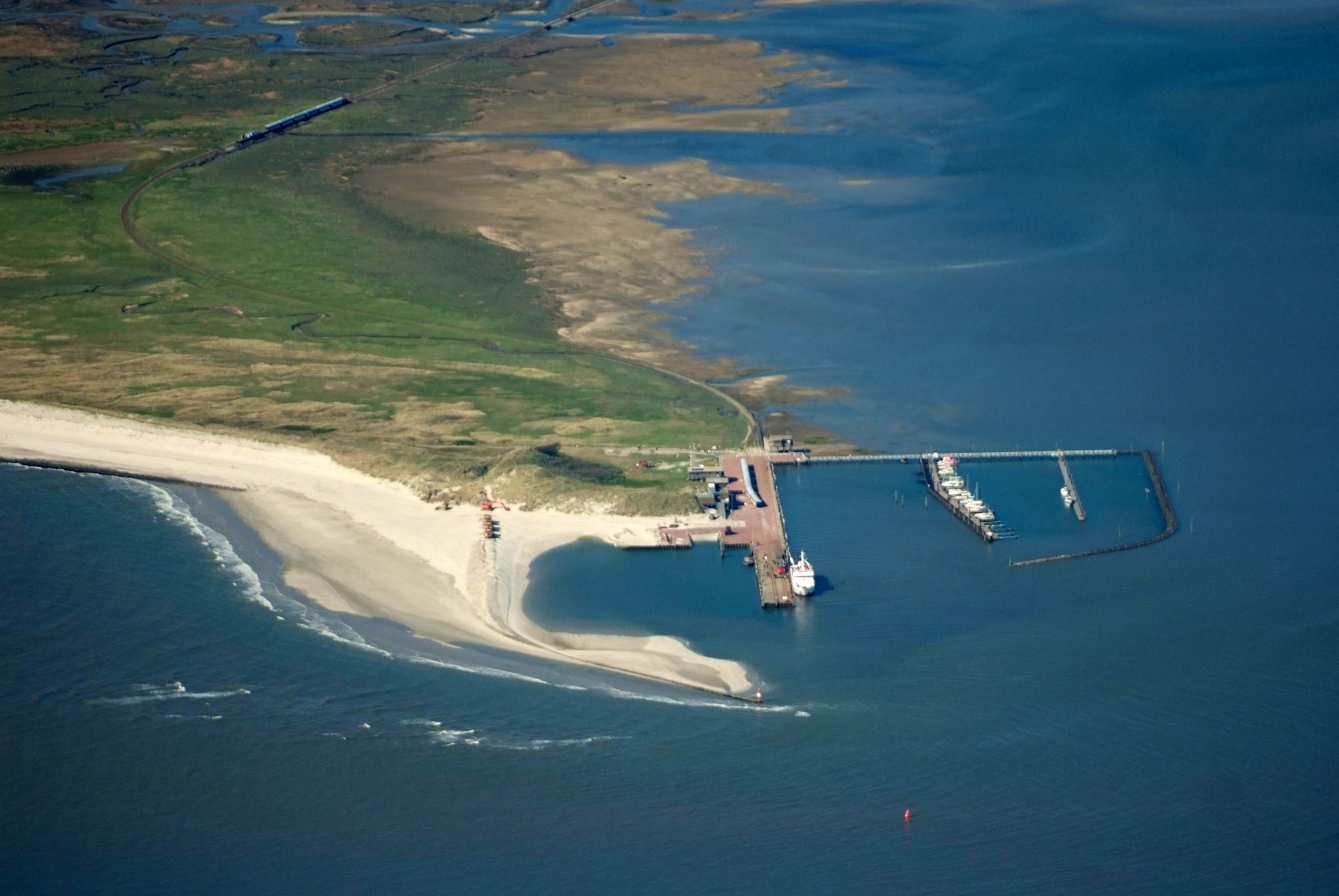
West pier Wangerooge

== Special features ==
One unique feature of the island village is Café Pudding. Centrally located, it is considered one of the island's landmarks. The café is situated on a round dune hill along the beach promenade. In 1855, a beacon was erected on the dune as a navigational marker. During World War II, the hill was transformed into a bunker. After the war, it was demilitarized on the orders of the occupying forces and later repurposed as a café.

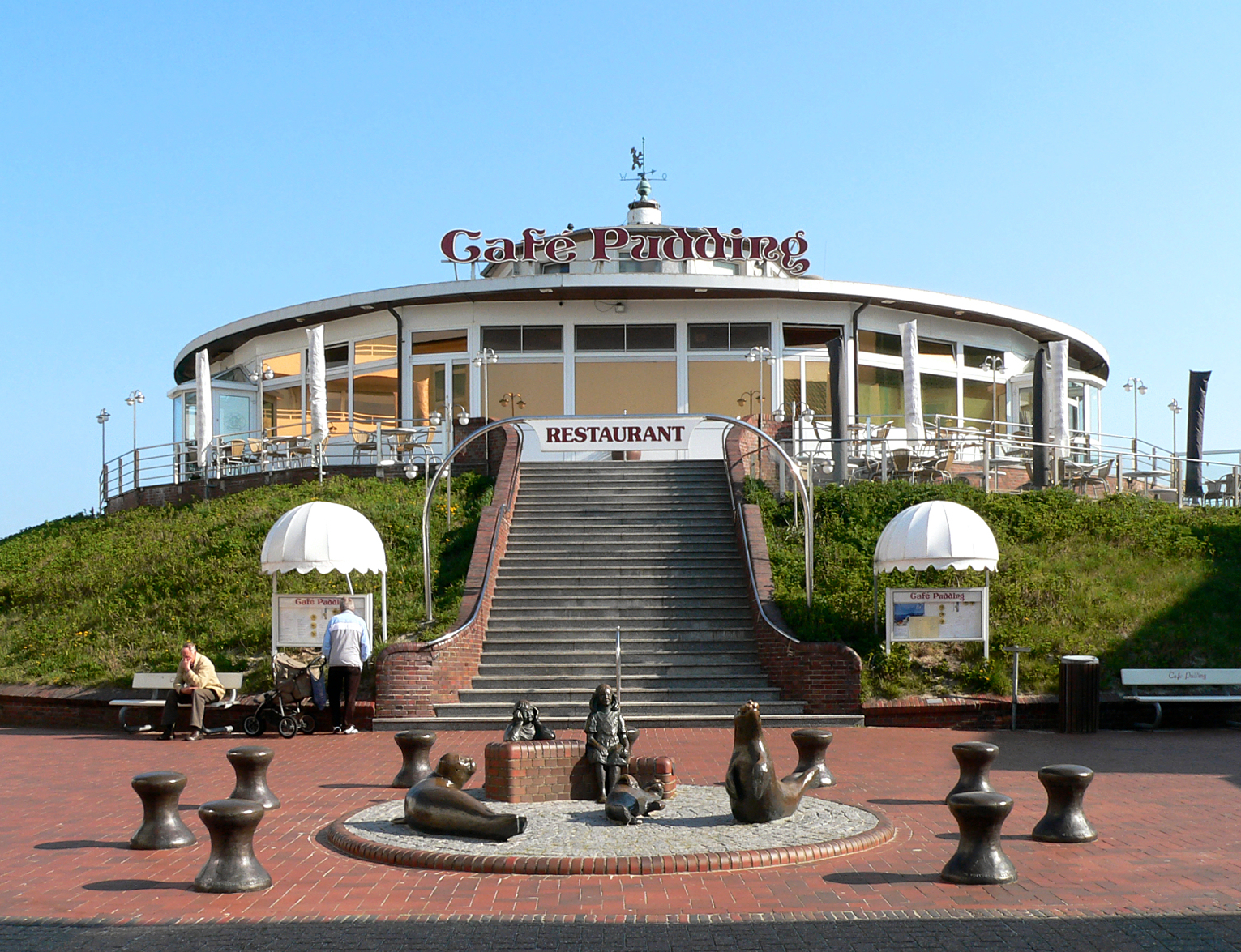
Café Pudding at the end of the pedestrian zone

=== Car-free environment ===
Wangerooge is free of cars and motor vehicles, with exceptions for emergency vehicles operated by the volunteer fire department, the rescue service, and the German Society for the Rescue of Shipwrecked Persons (Deutsche Gesellschaft zur Rettung Schiffsbrüchiger), as well as construction machinery. Other vehicles include electric carts for commercial transport and two large electric taxis. Until 2000, horse-drawn carriages were used for commercial cargo transport, but carriage rides for guests, especially for weddings, have since been reintroduced. Tourists arriving at the island's railway station often transport their luggage to their accommodations using handcarts provided by the landlords. Bicycles can be rented on the island or brought over by ferry. While pedelecs (electric bikes up to 25 km/h) are permitted, speed pedelecs (45 km/h), electric scooters, Segways, hoverboards, and e-skateboards are prohibited. The network of paths and cycle routes is well-developed, except at the far eastern end of the island.

=== Ferry ===
Ferry transport operated by DB Fernverkehr departs from the western pier in the southwest of the island. Several ferries run daily, with schedules depending on the tides. The pier, known locally as "Kanonenbrücke" (Cannon Bridge), was built in 1912 for military purposes to transport heavy artillery. It is now connected to a marina. Wangerooge's mainland harbor is Harlesiel, near Carolinensiel, which handles the majority of passenger and freight traffic to the island. Until 1958, Wangerooge had a tide-independent pier at its eastern end, which later silted up, leaving only wooden remains. Additionally, a tide-dependent marina in the island's center, south of the Saline area, was in operation until the late 1990s.

=== Air travel ===
Wangerooge can be accessed via its small airfield, Flugplatz Wangerooge, located east of the island village at the end of Charlottenstraße. Managed by Wangerooger Flughafen GmbH since 1929, the airfield is officially classified as Verkehrslandeplatz Wangerooge (commercial airfield Wangerooge). It features two runways: an 850 meter asphalt runway and a 500 meter grass runway. The airfield is served hourly by planes from FLN Frisia-Luftverkehr, which operate from the nearby Flugplatz Harle, just five flight minutes away. There is also a helicopter landing pad. The airfield is closed during midday breaks, and only rescue aircraft, such as the ADAC rescue helicopter Christoph 26 stationed at Sanderbusch Hospital in Sande, are allowed to land outside operating hours.

=== Island railway ===
The Wangerooge Island Railway is a narrow-gauge railway with a 1,000 mm track width. It regularly transports passengers and freight arriving via the ferry connection from Harlesiel over a three-kilometer route from the west pier (Westanleger) to the centrally located village railway station. A branch line to the Westen station is operated as needed. Between 1905 and 1958, the railway extended beyond the village station to the tide-independent east pier (Ostanleger). Due to the tide-dependent ferry schedules, the island railway's timetable also varies daily. A yearly schedule provides the times for each day. The railway is operated by DB Fernverkehr (long-distance transport), a subsidiary of Deutsche Bahn AG, making the Wangerooge Island Railway the only narrow-gauge railway run by Deutsche Bahn.

Impressions

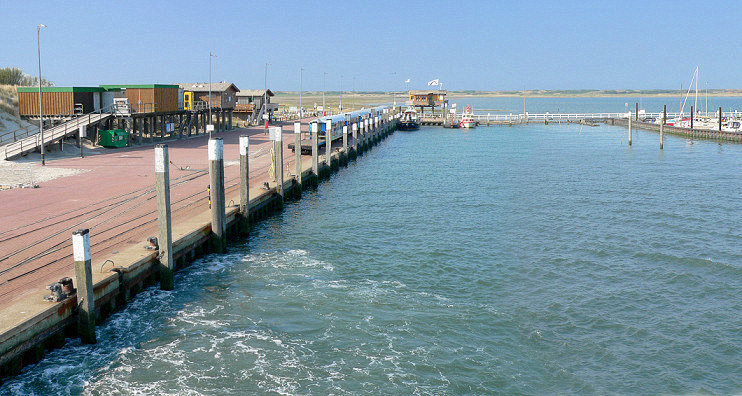
West pier

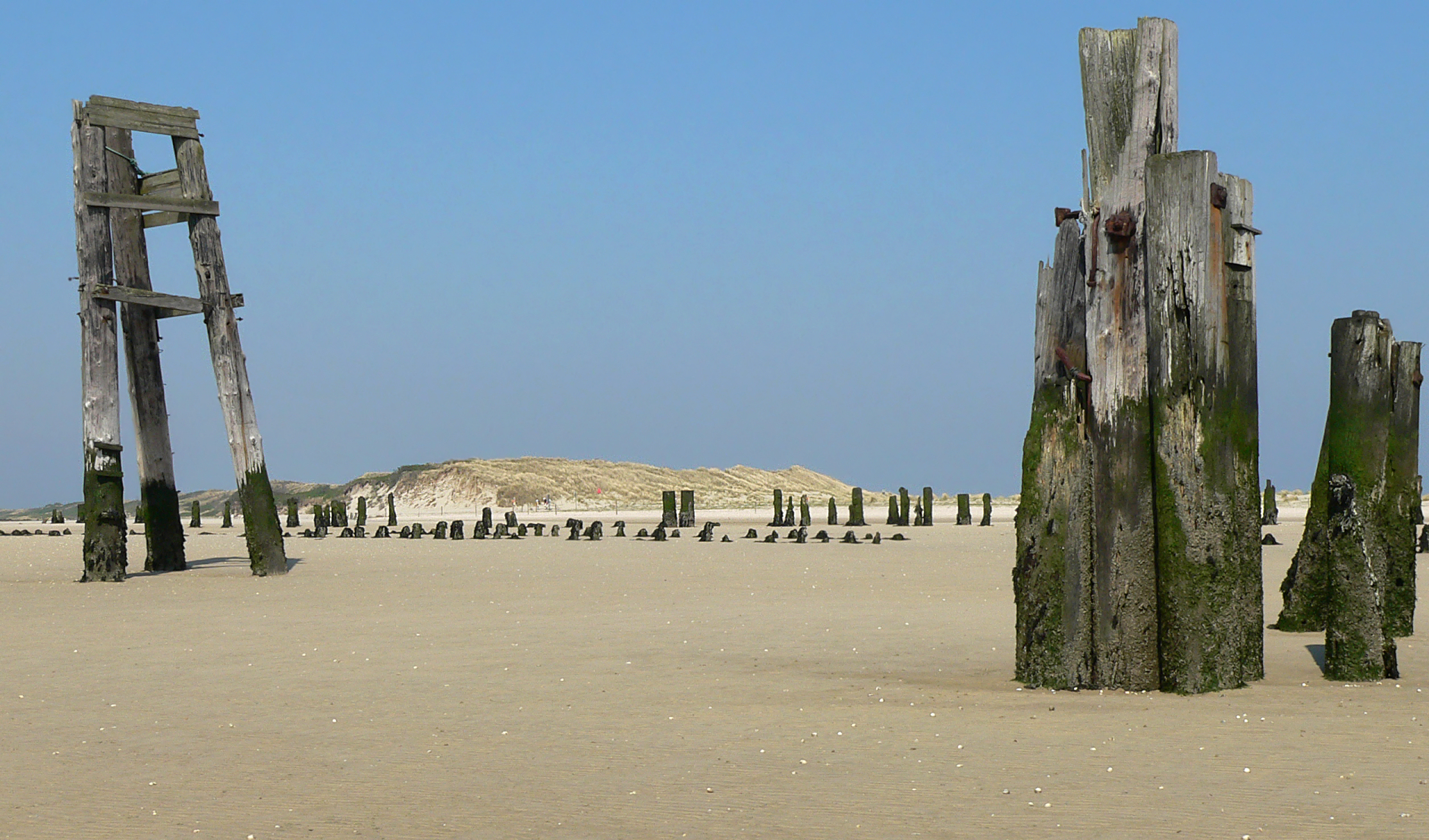
Remains of the former east pier

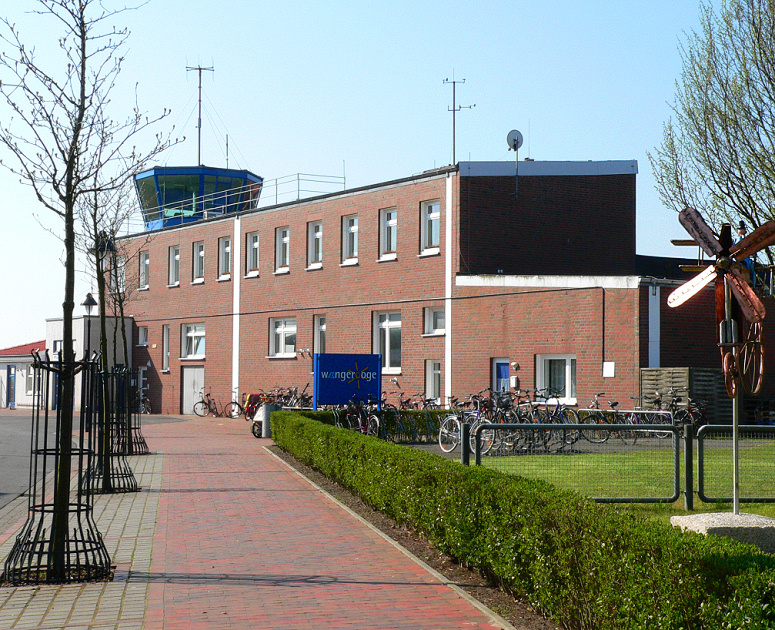
Airport building with tower

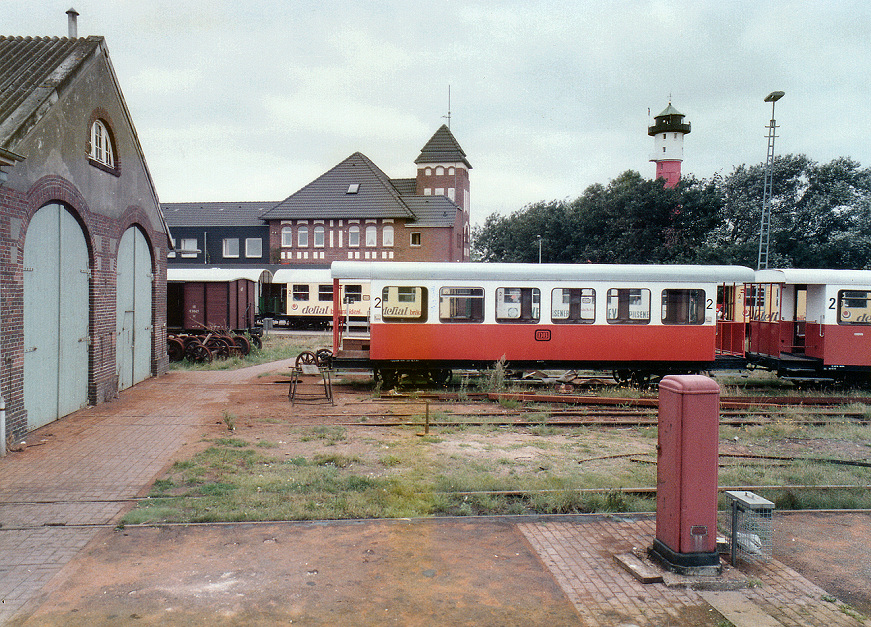
Train station with engine shed, 1984

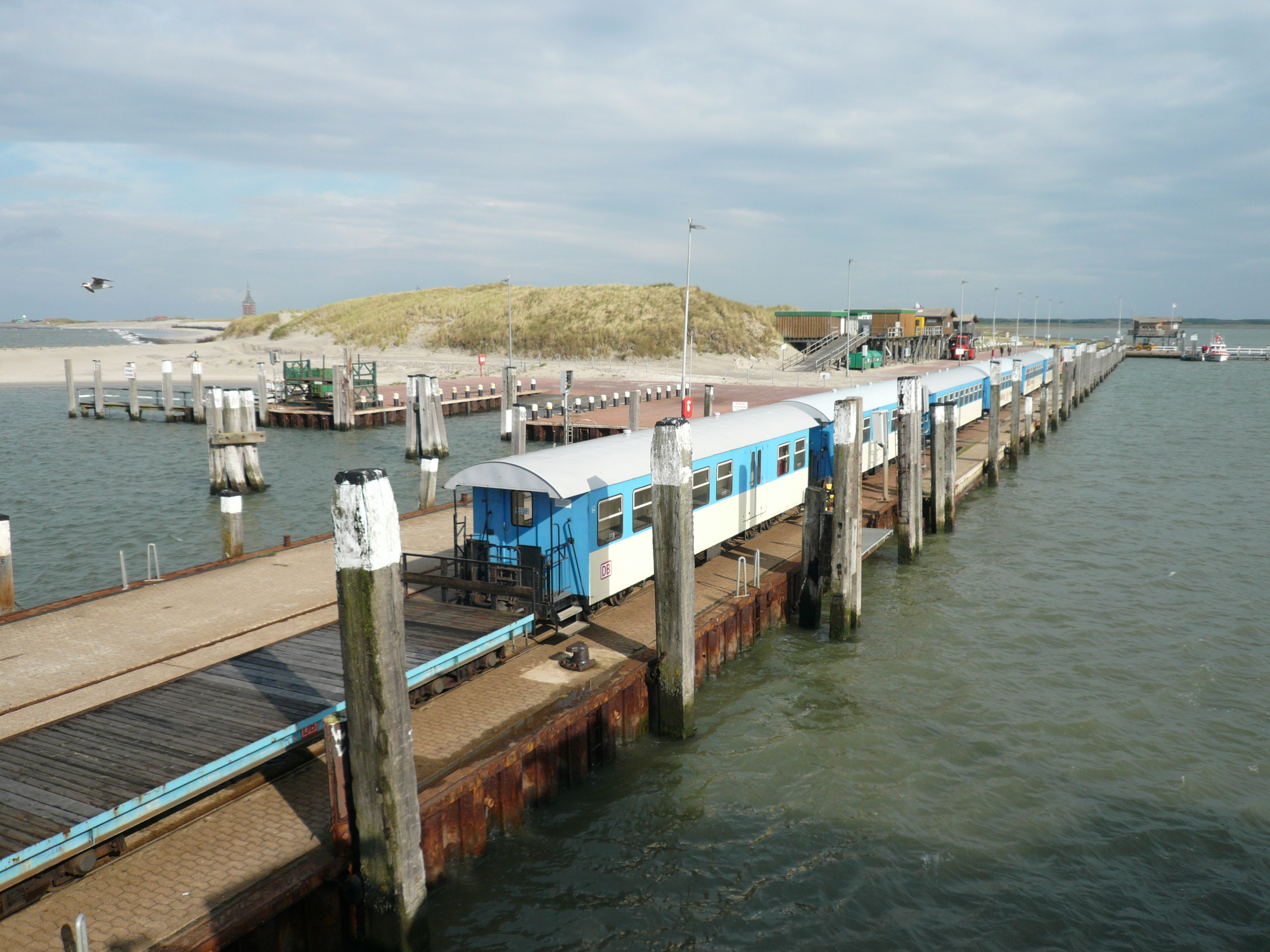
The island railway at the west pier

== See also ==
- East Frisian Islands
- List of ferry boats of the East Frisian Islands
