= Harle (gat) =

Coordinates: 53.769829°N 7.849331°E

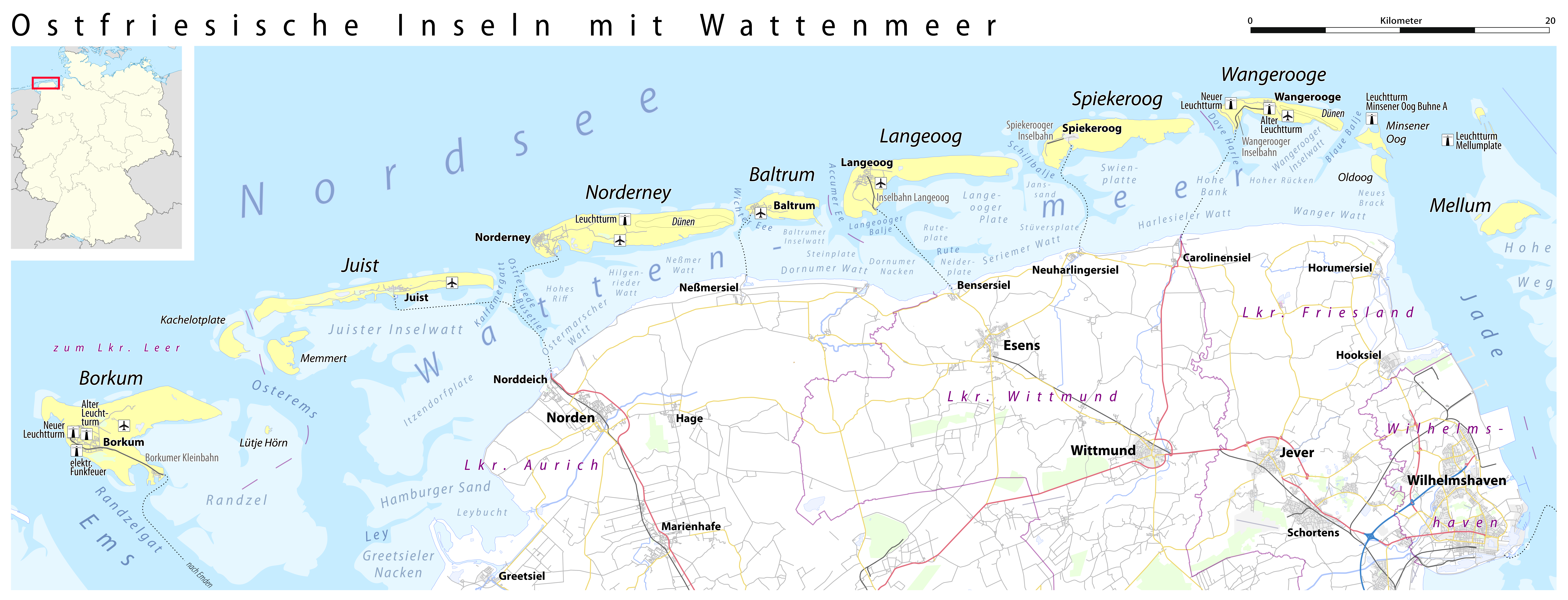
The Harle between Spiekeroog and Wangerooge

The Harle or the Harle Seegatt is a gat in the North Sea.

The Harle runs in a north-south direction between the East Frisian Islands of Spiekeroog and Wangerooge. The main channel subsequently divides into the Alte Harle (Muschelbalje) and the approach to the port of Wangerooge, the Dove Harle auf. The location and depth of the Harle navigation channel undergoes major changes. Its depth is published monthly in the notice to mariners.

For a long time Wangerooge was the island with the greatest movement from west to east. The reason was the Harle Seegatt, which continuously eroded the western tip of the island. The western tip of the island was not protected from erosion until the 1960s, when groynes and a concrete barrier were built. The longest groyne runs from the western end of Wangerooge to just in front of the eastern tip of Spiekeroog and poses a not insignificant hazard for shipping because it cannot be crossed at high tide.

As a result of the expansion of the Wangeroog harbour area, Niedersachsen Ports has become responsible for the transition zone between port and gat. The new channel is known as the Wangeroog Navigation (Wangerooge Ansteuerung).
