= Harle Airfield =

Harle Airfield Flugplatz Harle
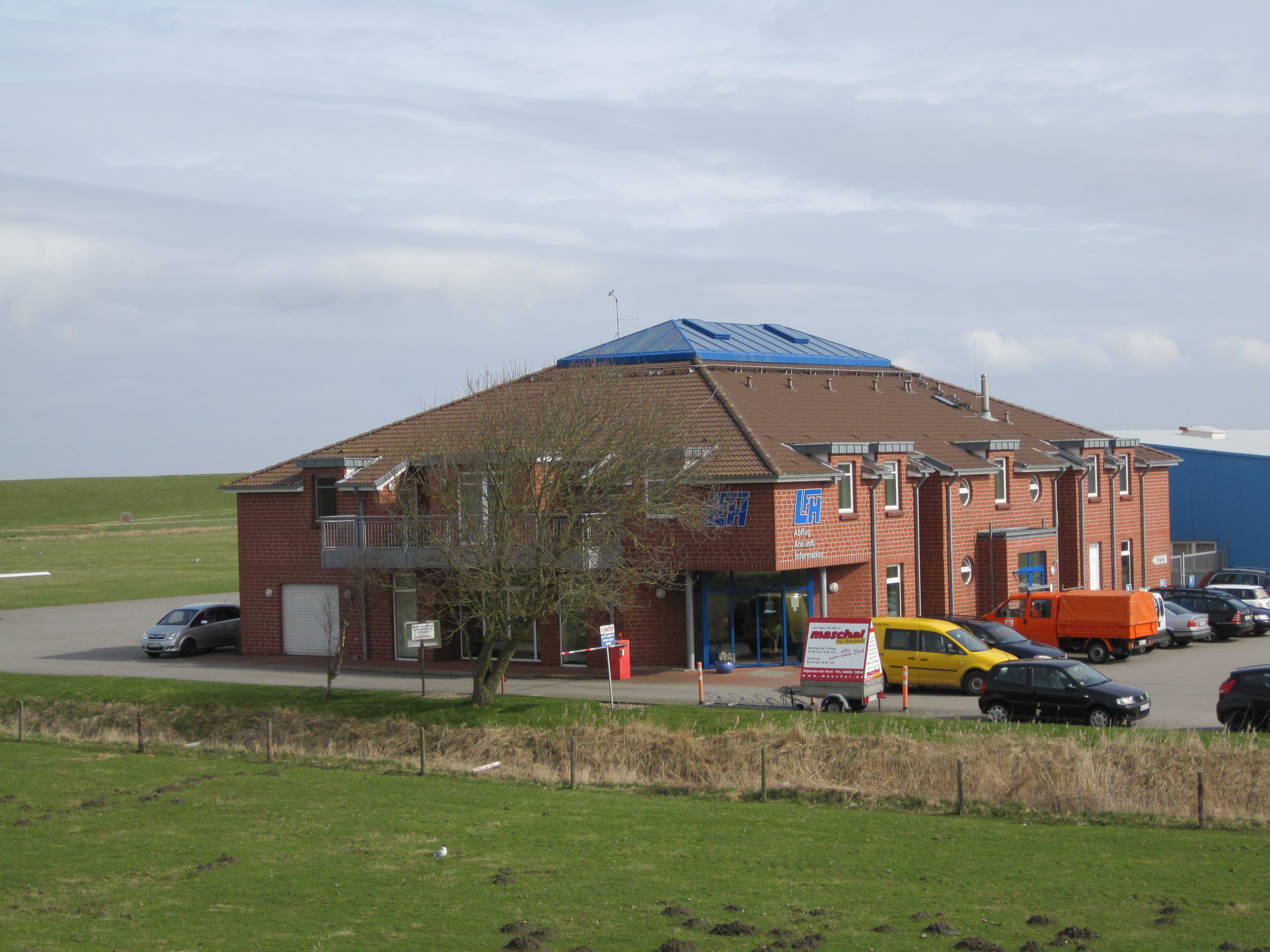
- IATA: none; ICAO: EDXP

Summary
- Operator: Friesischer Flugplatz Harle -Brunzema und Partner KG
- Location: Wangerland, Germany
- In use: 1972
- Elevation AMSL: 7 ft / 2 m
- Coordinates: 53°42′23.7″N 7°49′12″E
- Interactive map of Harle Airfield

Runways
Direction	Length		Surface
Direction	ft	m	Surface
09/27	1,673	510	asphalt

Harle Airfield, German: Flugplatz Harle (ICAO: EDXP), is a small airfield in Wangerland in the district of Friesland in Lower Saxony, Germany, about 700 meters from Harlesiel. However, the airfield has an address of the city of Wittmund, as its only access from Harlesiel is possible, which belongs to the Wittmund district Carolinensiel.

== Airlines and destinations ==
The following airlines offer regular scheduled and charter flights at Harle Airfield:

Airlines	Destinations
FLN Frisia Luftverkehr	Wangerooge
