= Harlesiel =

Coordinates: 53°42′25″N 7°48′29″E

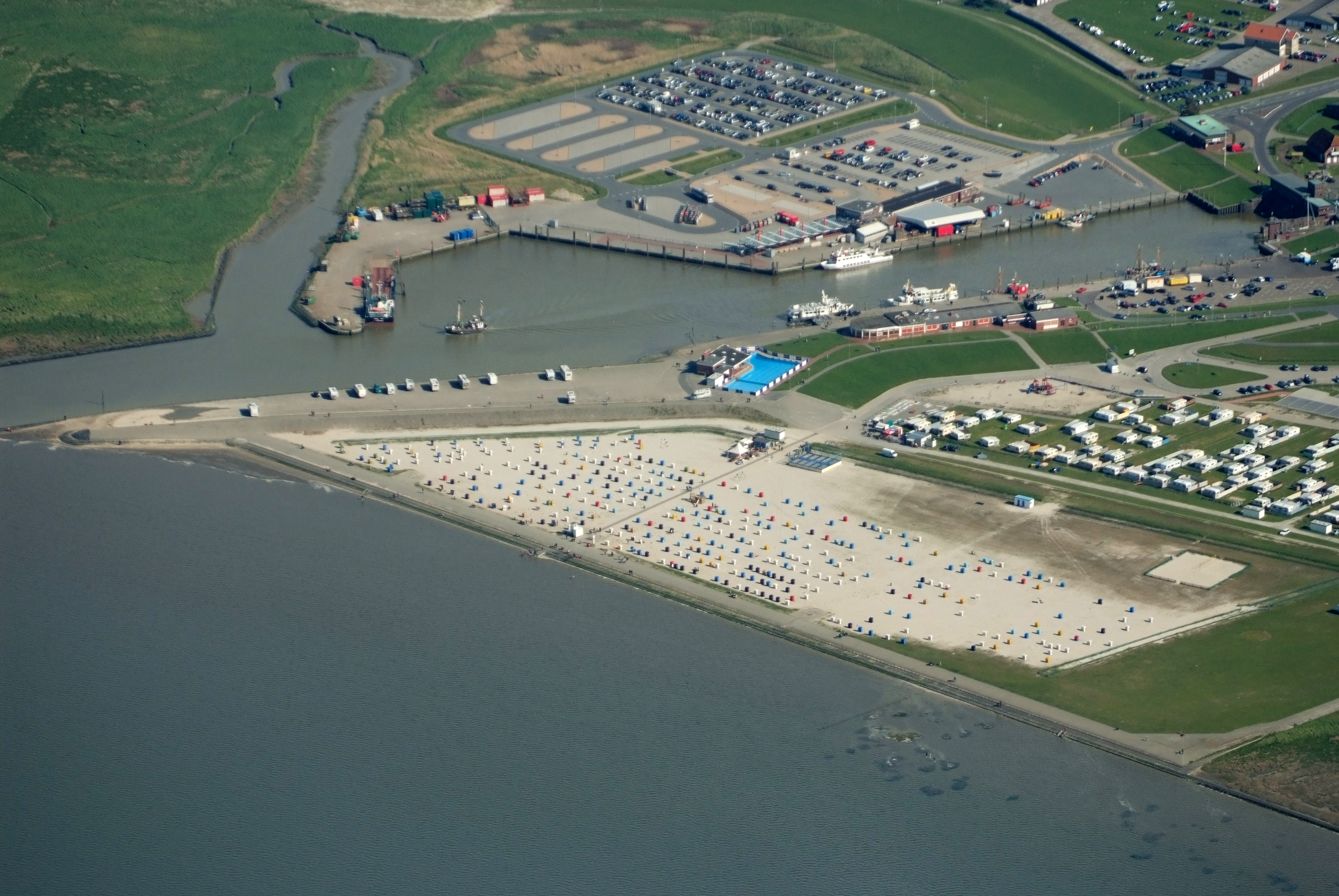
Harlesiel outer harbor, with ferry terminal and recreational facilities. The pumping station/lock is at the extreme right.

Harlesiel is a resort town on the East Frisian coast of Germany, at the mouth of the Harle River. It lies in the Wittmund district, about 1 kilometre (0.62 mi) north of Carolinensiel. It is a small town, with a population of 809 in 2009, swelled by some 4800 tourists in season.

Harlesiel was founded in 1956, part of the last stages of the draining of the Harlebucht. The inner and outer harbors of the town are divided by the pumping station which keeps the land dry; this building incorporates a lock to allow passage to the sea. Many tourist attractions and facilities were added over the years including campgrounds, a beach, a salt water swimming pool, and a miniature golf course. An airstrip was built in 1973, and a ferry runs to Wangerooge. Harlesiel was also made the terminus of the Jever-Harle railway branch until that line was abandoned in 1989; the former station building now serves as a station for the ferry service.
