= Seebäderschiff =

Seebäderschiff is a type of ship used for ferry service in the waters of Germany. Primarily to the East Frisian Islands.

The word is composed from the three words See- (Sea) Bäder- (bathing resorts) Schiff (ship).

== Gallery ==
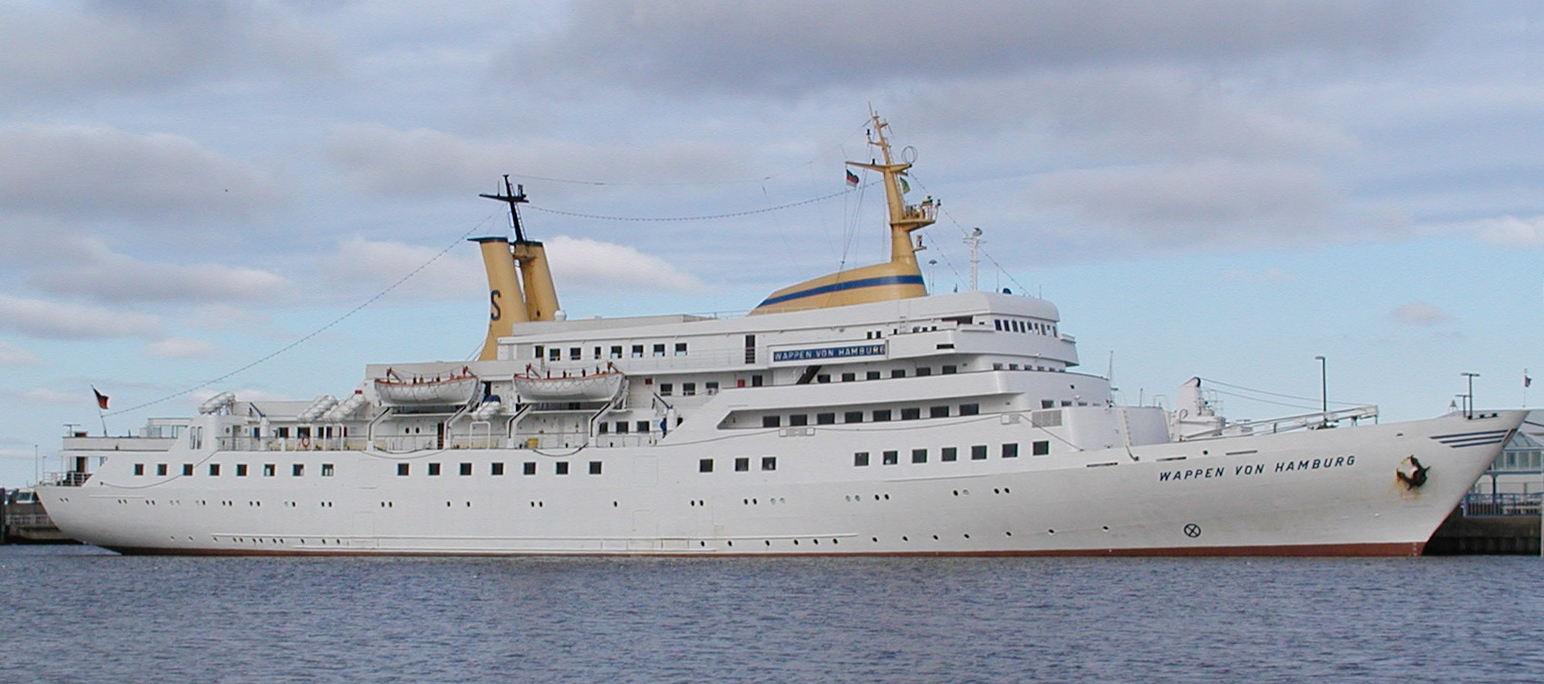
Wappen von Hamburg

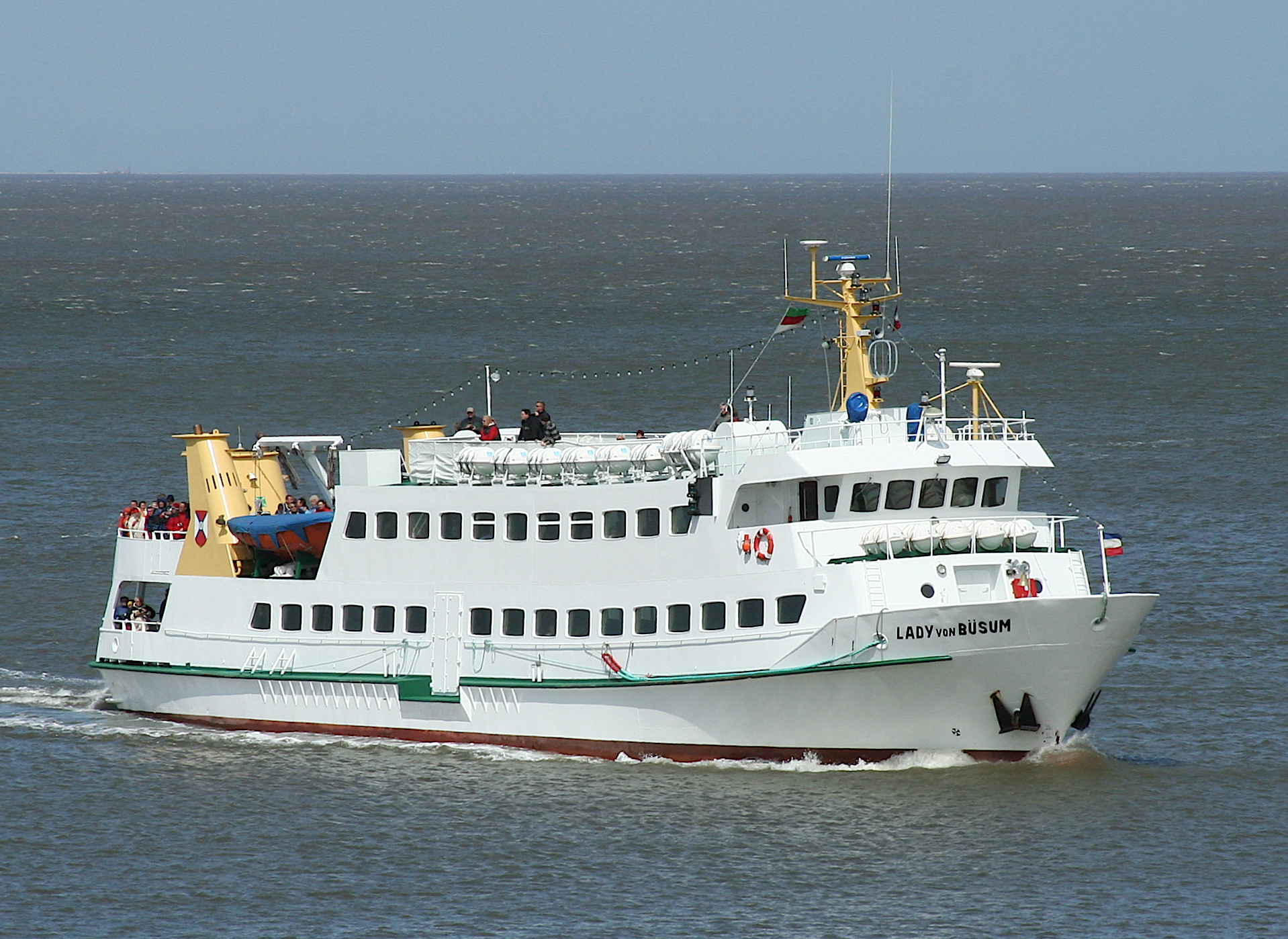
Lady von Büsum

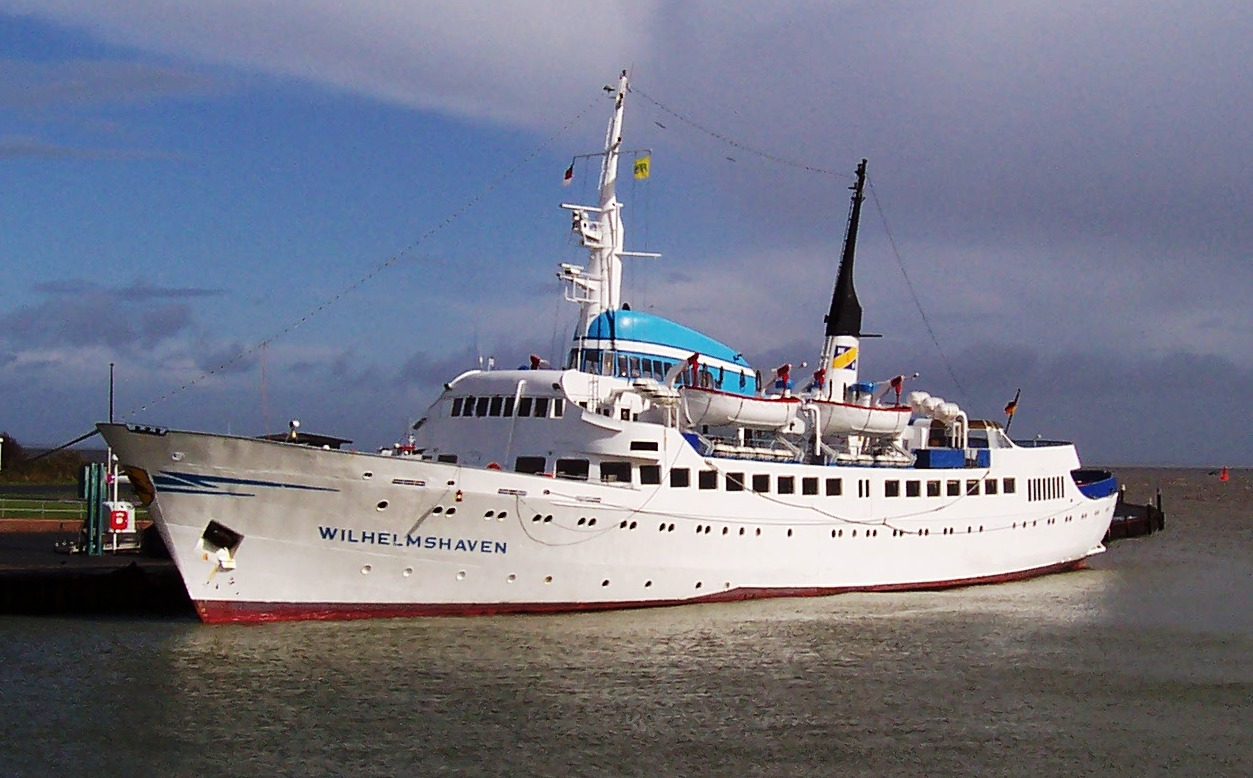
Wilhelmshaven

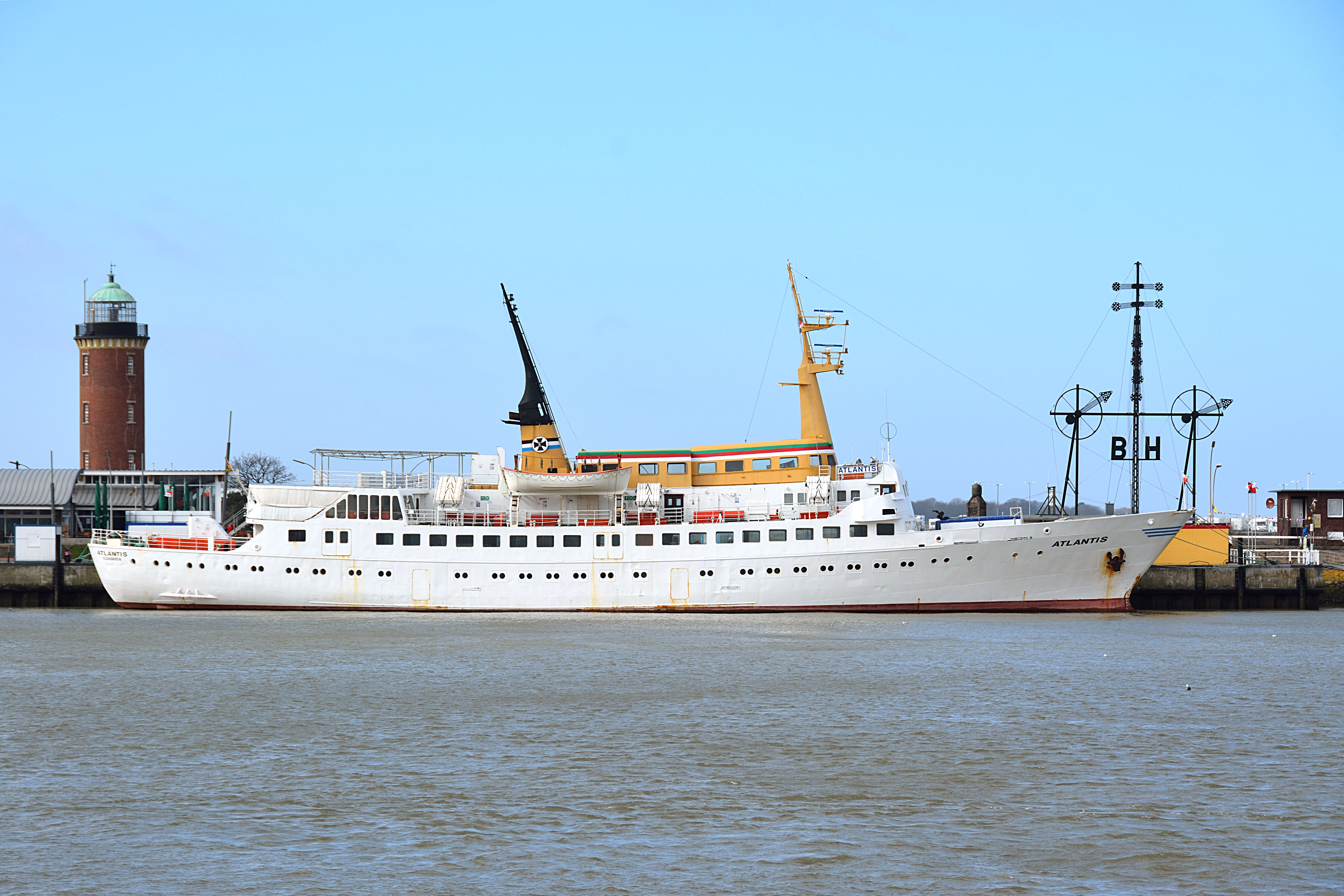
Atlantis

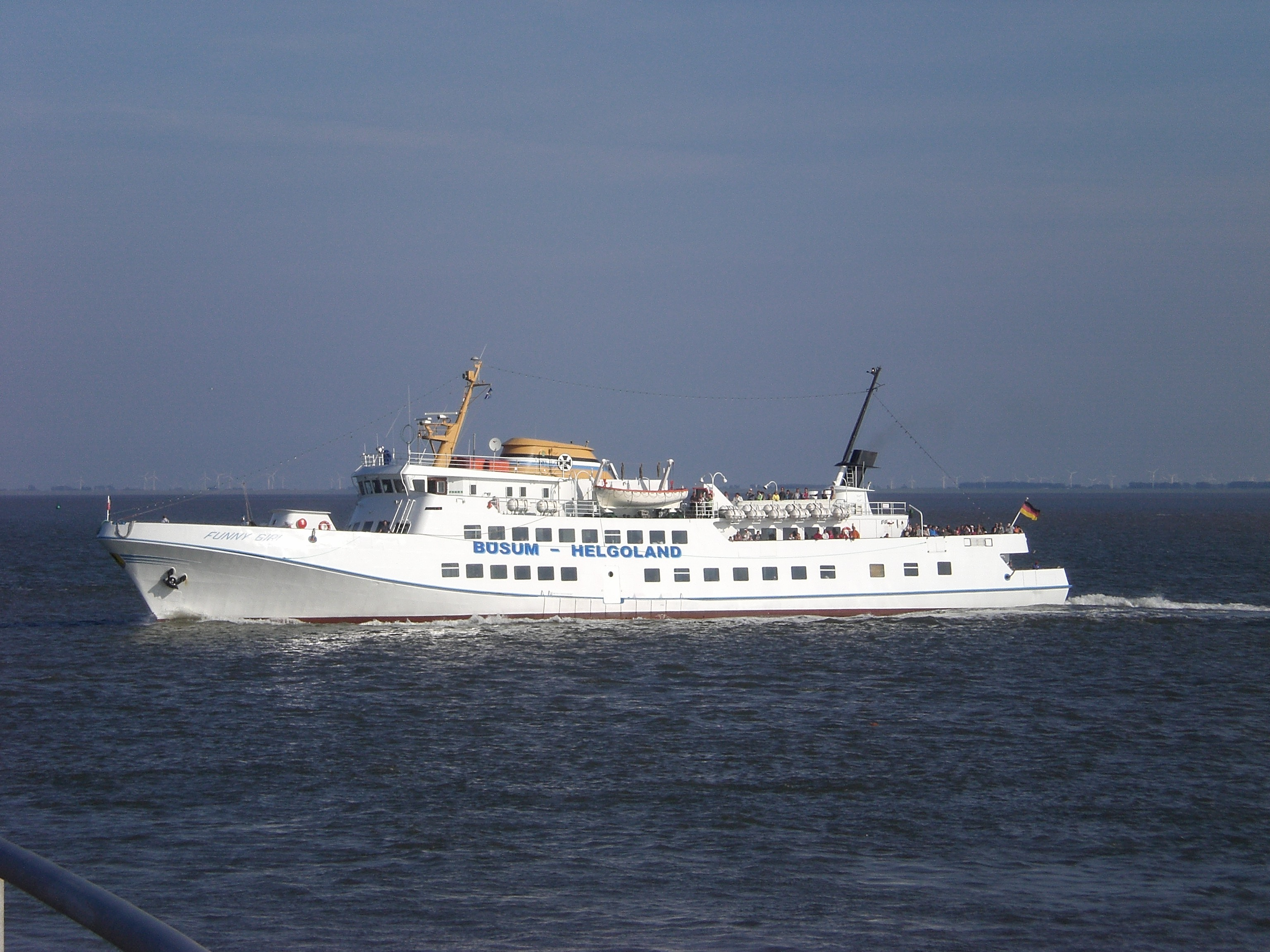
Funny Girl
