= FLN Frisia Luftverkehr =

German regional airline

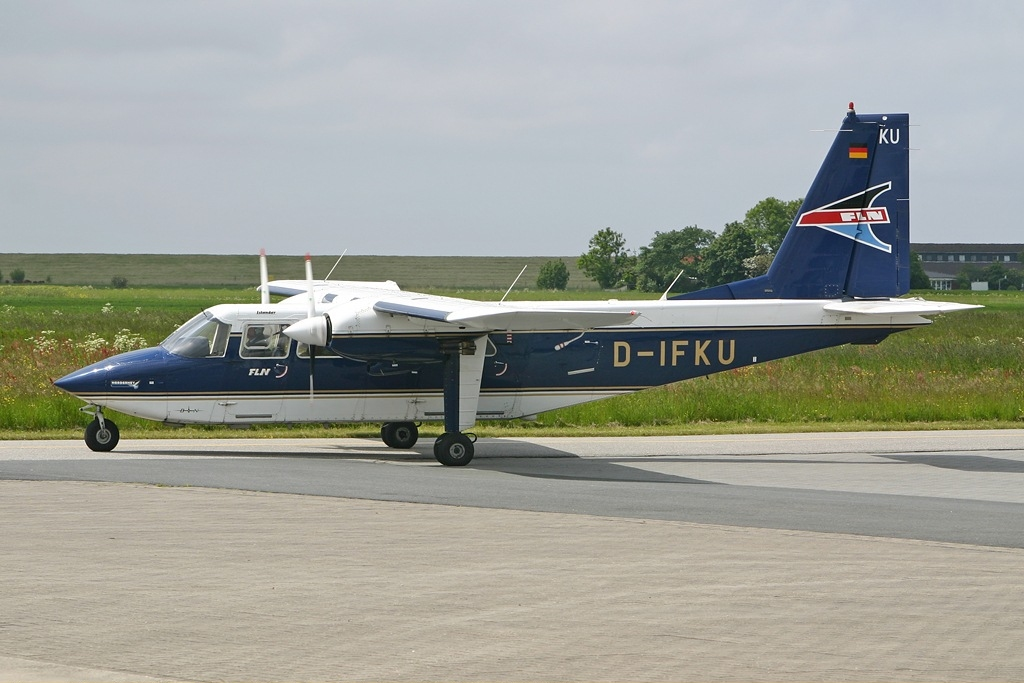
- Britten-Norman Islander
IATA	ICAO	Call sign
-	FRS	—
- Founded: 14 June 1969
- Commenced operations: 1969
- Hubs: Norddeich
- Fleet size: 9
- Destinations: 4
- Headquarters: Norden, Germany
- Website: inselflieger.de

FLN-Frisia-Luftverkehr, doing business as Inselflieger (Islandflyer in German language), is a small regional airline based in Norden, Lower Saxony, which was founded on 14 June 1969.

== History ==
Frisia-Luftverkehr GmbH Norddeich was founded in 1969 and took over the sporadic flight operations carried out by a private company from Norddeich airfield. In 1972, the tiny air company acquired half of this airfirld and began the first scheduled flights to the small Frisian Islands. In the years of peace following WWII, the islands of Borkum, Heligoland, Juist, Norderney, and Wangerooge had all become popular holiday destinations. FLN now offered the possibility of fast transport, avoiding the often rough ferry trips. From 1978 to 1988, it operated in conjunction with OLT and Dollart within the OFD-Ostfriesischer Flug Dienst holding company, established by the ferry company Reederei Norden-Frisia. The real enemies to be faced, however, remained visibility (i.e. the thick fog present in the area for many months of the year) and the effect of salinity on aircraft.

At the end of the 1980s, annual passenger traffic exceeded 35,000, with the Juist route taking first place, followed by the Norderney route. In the following years FLN became a subsidiary of OLT-Ostfriesische GmbH and in 2014 changed its corporate name to Frisia-Luftverkehr. In the same year, it absorbed fellow LFH-Luftverkher Friesland Harle, which had already been a subsidiary since 2011.

== Destinations ==
At the beginning of 2020s, FLN operated scheduled flights between Norddeich and Juist, Harle and Wangerooge as well as on-demand charter flights to other East Frisian Islands.

In 2025, FLN announced it would terminate scheduled flights between Juist and Norddeich due to decreasing passenger numbers, which prefer to use the newly established express ferries. The airline subsequently also announced it would remove four aircraft from its fleet.

== Fleet ==
As of February 2025, the FLN Frisia Luftverkehr fleet consisted of the following aircraft:

Aircraft type	In service	Passengers	Remarks
Britten-Norman Islander	6	9	4 serie 20 and 2 serie 26
Total	9		

== Accidents and incidents ==
- FLN had to write off two of its Britten-Norman Islander aircraft after crash landings (on 12 January 1979 at Juist and on 18 May 1983 at Schleswig), neither resulting in any fatalities.
