= Langeoog =

- Municipality
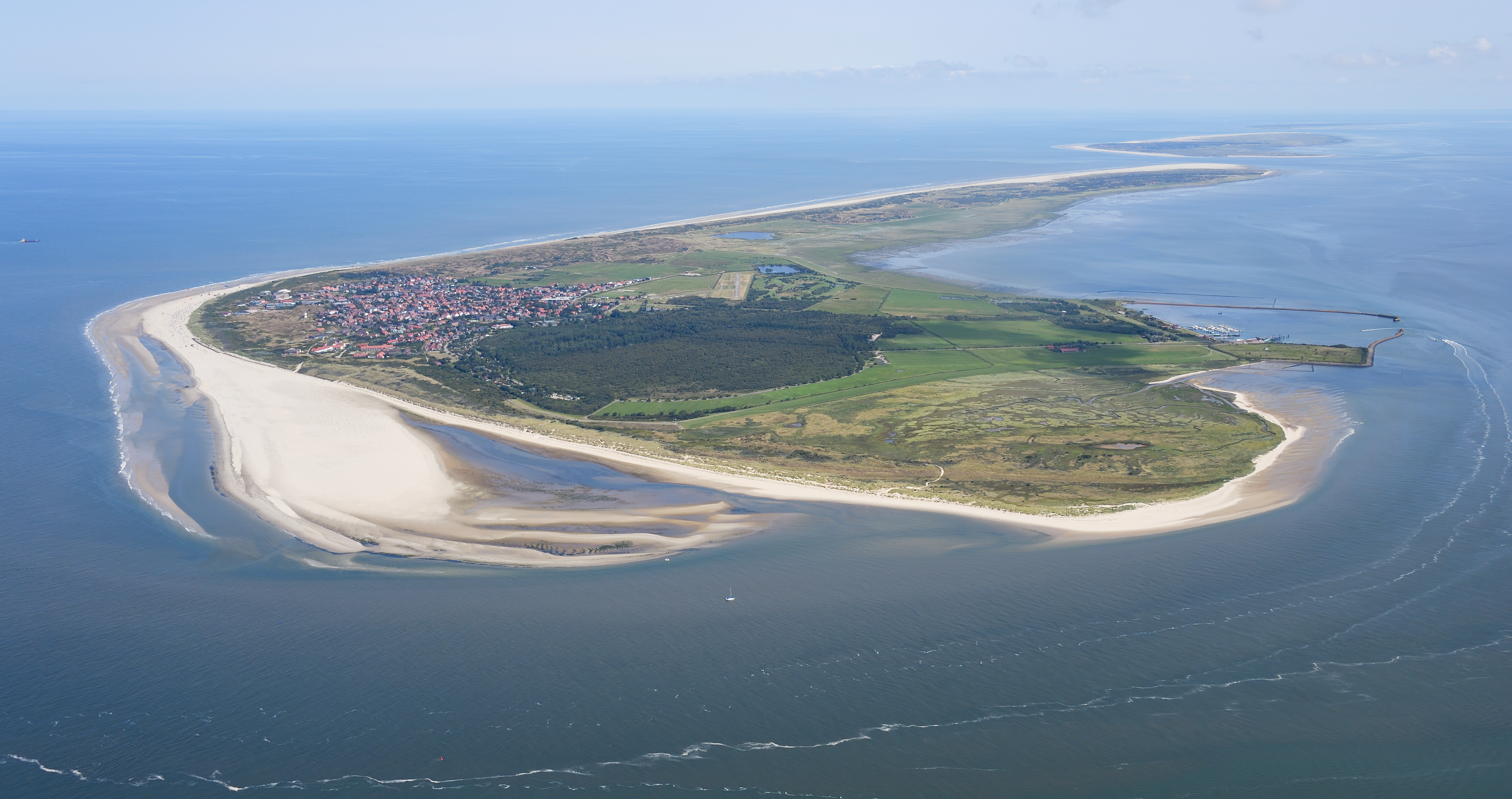
- Aerial view of Langeoog from the southwest

- Flag Coat of arms

- Location of Langeoog within Wittmund district
- Interactive map of Langeoog
- Location within Germany Location within Lower Saxony
- Coordinates: 53°44′54″N 7°28′47″E
- Country: Germany
- State: Lower Saxony
- District: Wittmund

Government
  - Mayor (2019–24): Heike Horn (Ind.)

Area
  - Total: 19.73 km^{2} (7.62 sq mi)
- Elevation: 5 m (16 ft)

Population (2025-12-31)
  - Total: 1,341
  - Density: 67.97/km^{2} (176.0/sq mi)
- Time zone: UTC+01:00 (CET)
  - Summer (DST): UTC+02:00 (CEST)
- Postal codes: 26465
- Dialling codes: 04972
- Vehicle registration: WTM
- Website: www.langeoog.de

Langeoog (German pronunciation: [ˈlaŋəˌʔoːk]; Low German: Langeoog) is one of the seven inhabited East Frisian Islands at the edge of the Lower Saxon Wadden Sea in the southern North Sea, located between Baltrum Island (west), and Spiekeroog (east). It is also a municipality in the district of Wittmund in Lower Saxony, Germany. The name Langeoog means Long Island in the Low German dialect.

== Geography ==
Langeoog's beach is 14 km (9 mi) long. Langeoog's actual size depends on the level of tide, which rises and falls about 2.5 metres (8 ft 2.4 in) in 6 hours.

=== Geology ===
Langeoog is geologically nothing but sand. Rainwater that falls into the sand has a lower density than saltwater, which makes a kind of freshwater bubble float over the saltwater surrounding and deep under the island.

The beach and the dunes are eroded by the sea in the western part of the island. Since about 1970, Langeoog's western end has moved several hundred metres to the east. This happens on every East Frisian island – some islands moved so far that the town had to be rebuilt several times. Every island except Juist and Langeoog has large concrete groynes at its western end to reduce erosion.

== History ==
=== Storm tides ===
In 1717 Langeoog was cut in three parts by the Christmas storm tide.

=== Nazi era ===
During the Nazi era, the government expanded Langeoog as an air base starting in 1940. On August 22, 1940, 250 French prisoners of war were transferred to the island to perform forced labor. Starting in 1941, 113 Soviet prisoners of war were also brought to the island. They died due to inhumane treatment; a memorial at the Langeoog Dunes Cemetery today commemorates their fate. There were also summer camps for the Hitler Youth on the island as early as the 1930s. During this same period, the expelled Jewish family of Heer were living there along with a group of Jewish children from Halberstadt who were in hiding and secretly cared for by the courageous Haus Bethanien sisters.

==== Deaths ====
The Iranologist and linguist Christian Bartholomae died on the island in 1925. The meteorologist Johannes Letzmann lived on Langeoog from 1962 to his death in 1971.

== Transportation ==
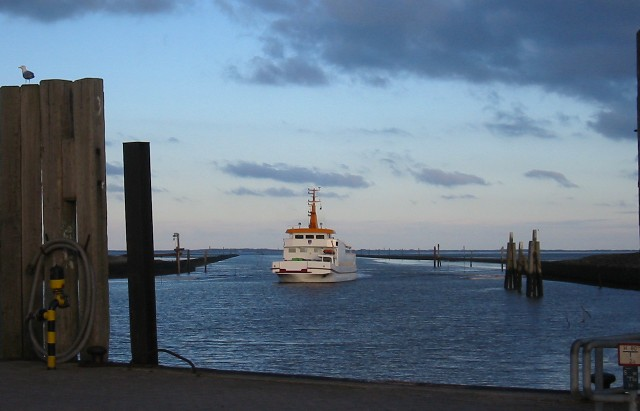
Ferry Langeoog IV in the morning

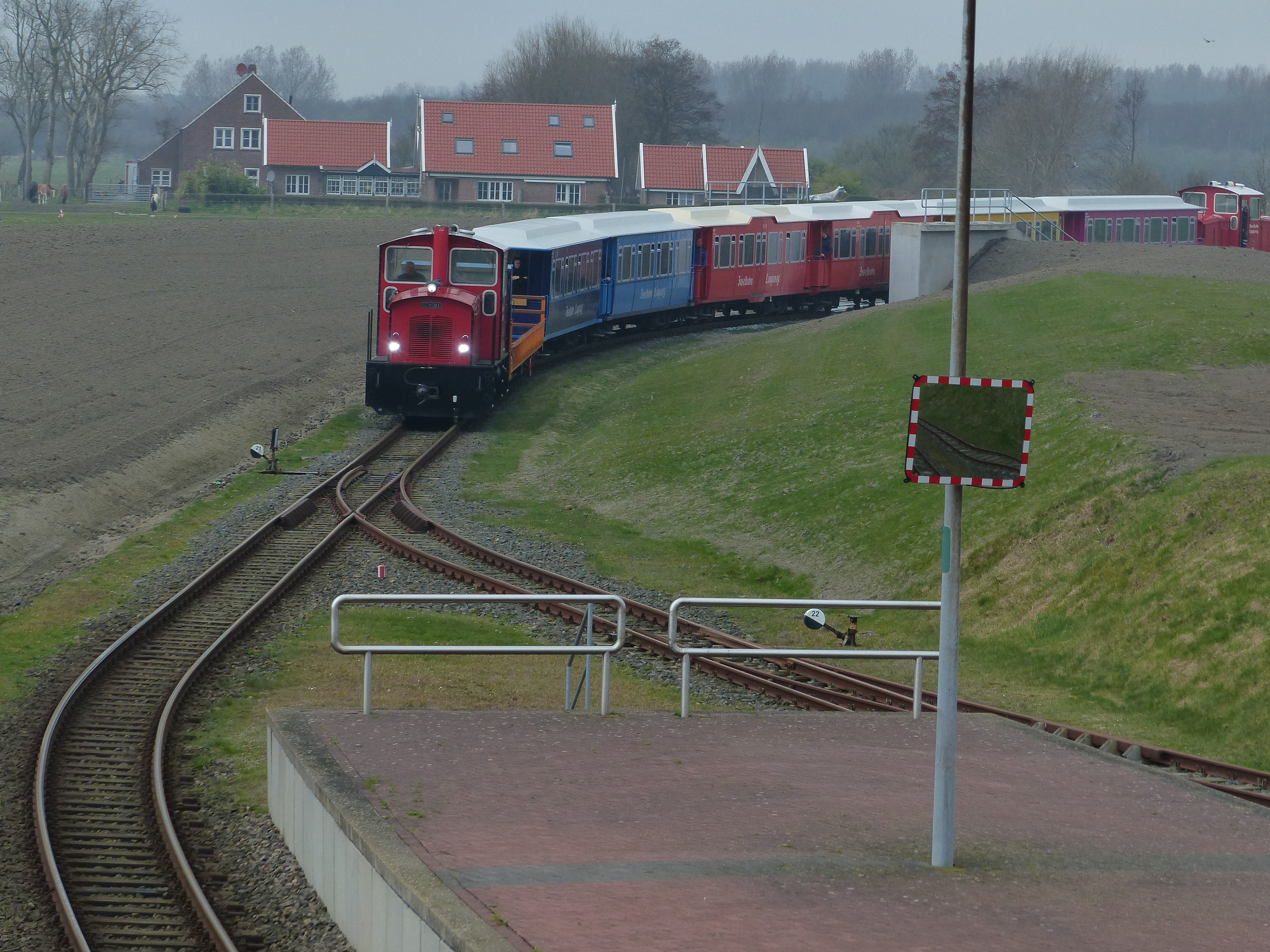
The Langeoog island railway

Langeoog can be reached from Bensersiel port on the East Frisian mainland by the ferries of the Langeoog Shipping Company: Langeoog I, Langeoog II, Langeoog III and Langeoog IV. Langeoog ferries' schedule does not depend on the tide, which is unusual among East Frisian ferries.

The port and the town are linked by a railway, and Langeoog also has an airport.

Nearest train station near the Benaersiel post is Esens on the East Frisian coastal railway, served by RB59 line from Oldenburg via Sande, Jever and Wittmund to Esens. Esens station and Benaersiel port are connected through local busses.

Langeoog largely has a no automobile policy. Visitors to the island have to leave their cars on the mainland. Only the fire department and ambulance service have standard motorized vehicles. Tractors and heavy construction vehicles can be operated within limits. The policemen and doctors get about on bicycles. Some companies (construction, drink delivery, post office, etc.) have electric cars. The post office and the shipping company have one electric car each. If one does not want to walk, one can rent a bicycle or take a horse carriage taxi.

== Tourism ==
Tourism is the main source of income for Langeoog's economy. There are guest rooms in almost all island buildings. There are also several hotels. The youth hostel is several kilometers outside the town.

The island's unpolluted air makes it popular with people who have respiratory problems.

== Landmarks ==
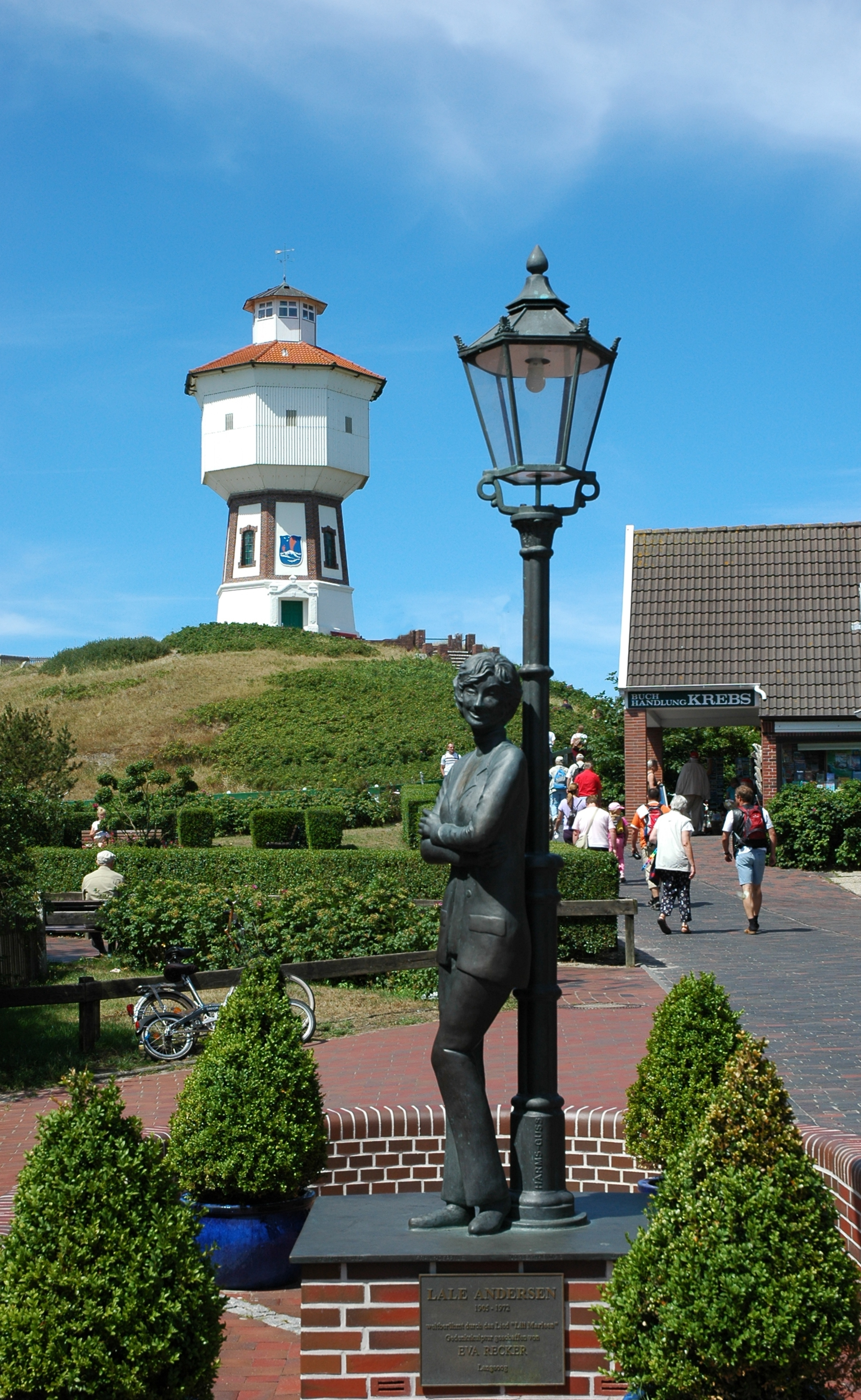
A Lili Marleen and Lale Andersen memorial in Langeoog

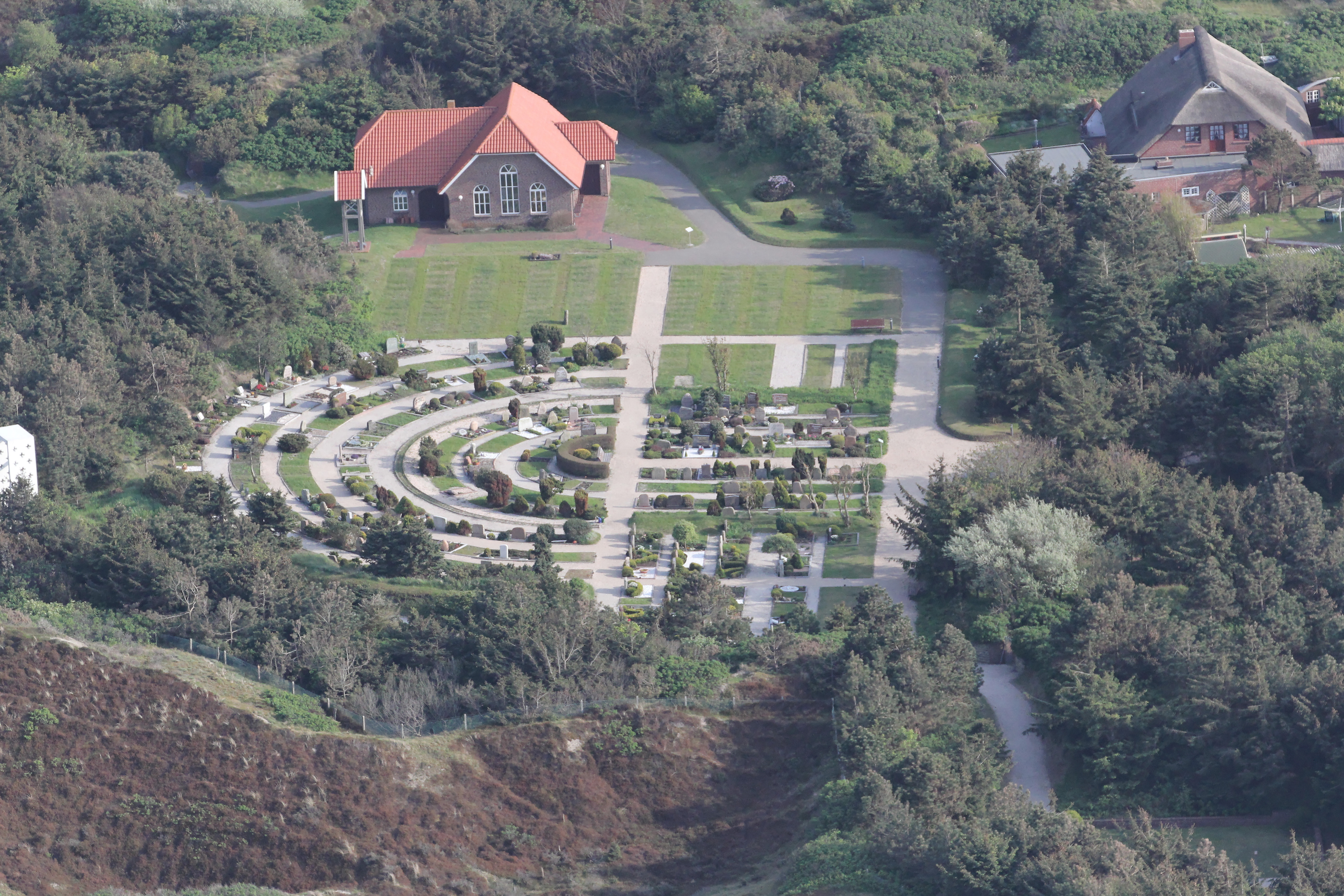
Dune cemetery with a memorial for Russian prisoners of war

Notable landmarks include Langeoog’s water tower as well as the towers of the Catholic and Protestant churches, all of which shape the island’s skyline. A prominent natural attraction was the Melkhörndüne, once the highest natural elevation in East Frisia and a popular destination for visitors. However, the large number of tourists climbing the dune each year caused sand erosion, and it is no longer the region’s highest point. This distinction now belongs to the White Dune on the neighbouring island of Spiekeroog. Another important site is the Seenotbeobachtungsstelle, the observation tower of the lifeboat service.

== Famous people ==
Singer-songwriter Lale Andersen, whose 1939 interpretation of the song Lili Marleen became tremendously popular during World War II, lived here for several years. Although she died in Vienna in 1972, she is buried on the island's dune cemetery. A bronze memorial in her honor has been erected on Langeoog.

== See also ==
- List of ferry boats of the East Frisian Islands
