= Henry Wheeler =

Henry Wheeler may refer to:

- Sir Henry Wheeler (civil servant) (1870–1950), governor of Bihar and Orissa
- Sir Neil Wheeler (Henry Neil George Wheeler, 1917–2009), Royal Air Force officer
- Henry Wheeler (cricketer) (1840–1908), English cricketer
- Henry Lord Wheeler (1867–1914), American organic chemist at Yale University and member of the National Academy of Sciences
- Henry Wheeler (politician) (1861–1935), Australian politician
- Henry Wheeler (signalman) (1925–2004), Royal Navy signalman
- Henry Wheeler of Dr. Henry Wheeler House, Grand Forks, North Dakota
- Henry Wheeler of Henry J. Wheeler Farm, Salt Lake Valley, Utah
- Henry H. Wheeler, early mail carrier in Central Oregon and namesake of Wheeler County, Oregon
- Henry W. Wheeler (1841–1904), American Civil War recipient of the Medal of Honor

== See also ==
- Harry Wheeler (disambiguation)
