= Großer Knechtsand =

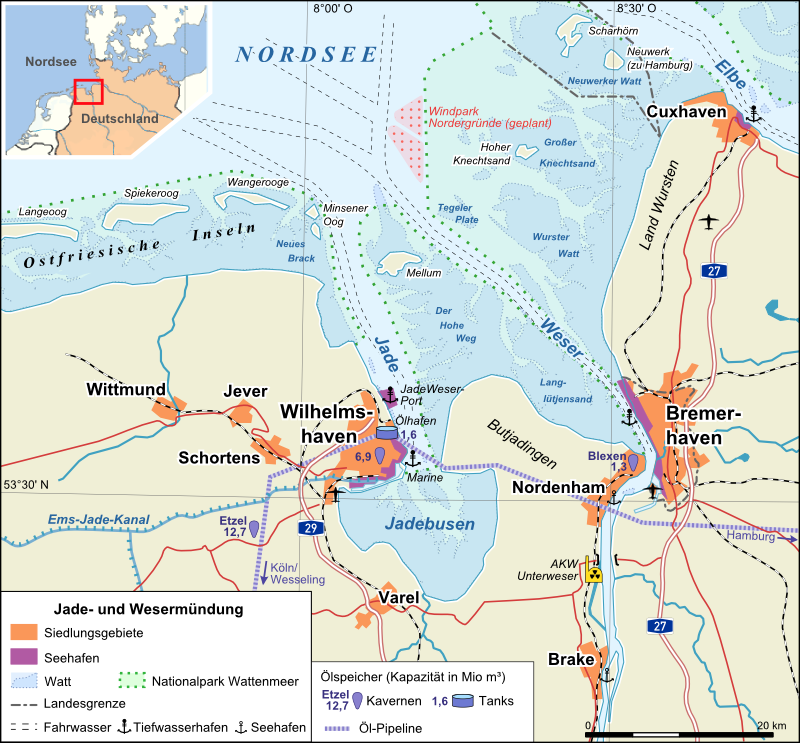
Großer Knechtsand off the Weser estuary

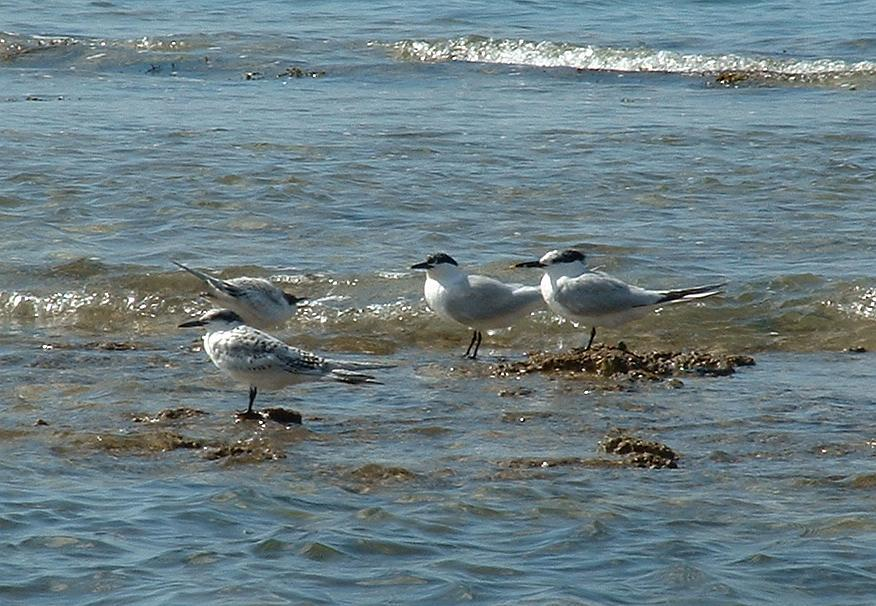
Sandwich terns on the Großer Knechtsand

The Großer Knechtsand (German pronunciation: [ˈɡʁoːsɐ ˈknɛçtˌzant]) is a large sandbank beyond the Weser and Elbe estuaries (in the Elbe-Weser Triangle) in the eastern part of Lower Saxony's Wadden Sea off the coast of North Germany. It lies between the islands of Mellum (which is 16 km (9.9 mi) to the southwest) and Neuwerk (11 km [6.8 mi] northeast). The central area of the sandbank lies above the high water mark, forming the Hochsand of Hoher Knechtsand, which was formerly an island. The Hochsand lies 11 km west of the village of Berensch on the nearest part of the mainland in the borough of Cuxhaven in the Land Wursten.

The Hoher Knechtsand measures 2.5 km (1.6 mi) in an east-west direction and is between 0.6 km (0.37 mi) wide in the west and 1.6 km (0.99 mi) wide in the east. The area of the sandbank above the high water mark is about 2.6 km^{2} (1.0 sq mi).

The Großer Knechtsand, together with the island of Trischen, is one of the most important moulting areas for the shelduck, and, with Trischen, Norderoog and Minsener Oog, has one of the largest and longest-lasting colonies of Sandwich terns. Eider duck and common seal also occur here in large numbers.

East of the Großer Knechtsand lie the mudflats of Spiekaer Barre. To the north and south it is bordered by the tidal channels (Priele) of Westertill, Ostertill and Robins Balje. Further southeast is the Wurster Watt off the coast of Land Wursten.

To enable the population of Heligoland to return to their home, the then Chancellor, Konrad Adenauer, offered the area around the Großer Knechtsand as an alternative site for military exercises. As a result, from 1952 the area acted as a target for practice bombing sharp explosive and incendiary bombs of the British Royal Air Force instead of Heligoland. A few years later, environmental awareness had increased and, when the contract expired in 1957, it was not renewed. This important area for resting and moulting shelduck and other seabirds was designated in 1957 as the largest German nature reserve in Germany. Since 1986 the area has been part of the strictly protected 'quiet zone' of Lower Saxon Wadden Sea National Park.

About 2 km northwest of the Großer Knechtsand lies the sandbanks of Kleine Knechtsände (53°50′N 8°18′E).

== Sources ==
- Friedrich, Ernst Andreas (1980). Naturdenkmale Niedersachsens. Hanover, ISBN 3-7842-0227-6.
