= Buise =

German island that became submerged in the 17th century

Coordinates: 53°42′26″N 7°08′49″E

Buise was one of the East Frisian Islands off the North Sea coast of Germany that was almost entirely engulfed by the sea in the second half of the 17th century. The only remaining part is the eastern end, known today as the island of Norderney. Buise itself was formed by the breakup of a bigger island. Two possible origins are mentioned: the breakup of the island Burchana in the flood of 1219, and the breakup of the island Bant (island) in 1170, which also formed Juist, Borkum and Memmert.

Buise broke up in two parts in 1362. The eastern part was called Osterende initially, and later "Norder neye Oog" (Nordens New Island), and today is the island Norderney. The western part disappeared slowly over the ages as a result of erosion, but sources do not agree on the exact date of the disappearance of Buise (the St. Peter's Flood of 1651 or 1690).
