= Kachelotplate =

Sandbar in the North Sea

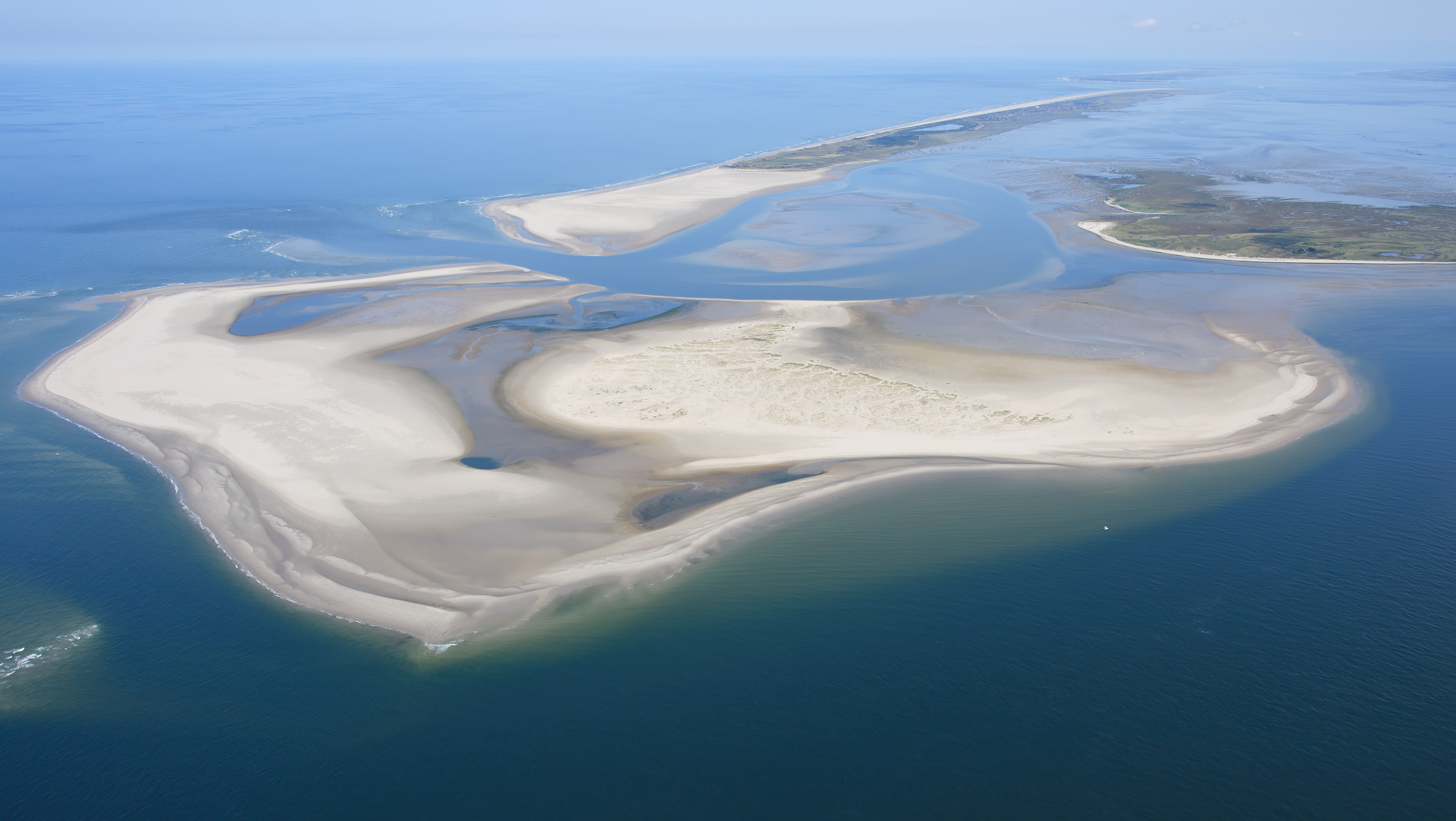
- Aerial view of Kachelotplate from the southwest with Juist in the background

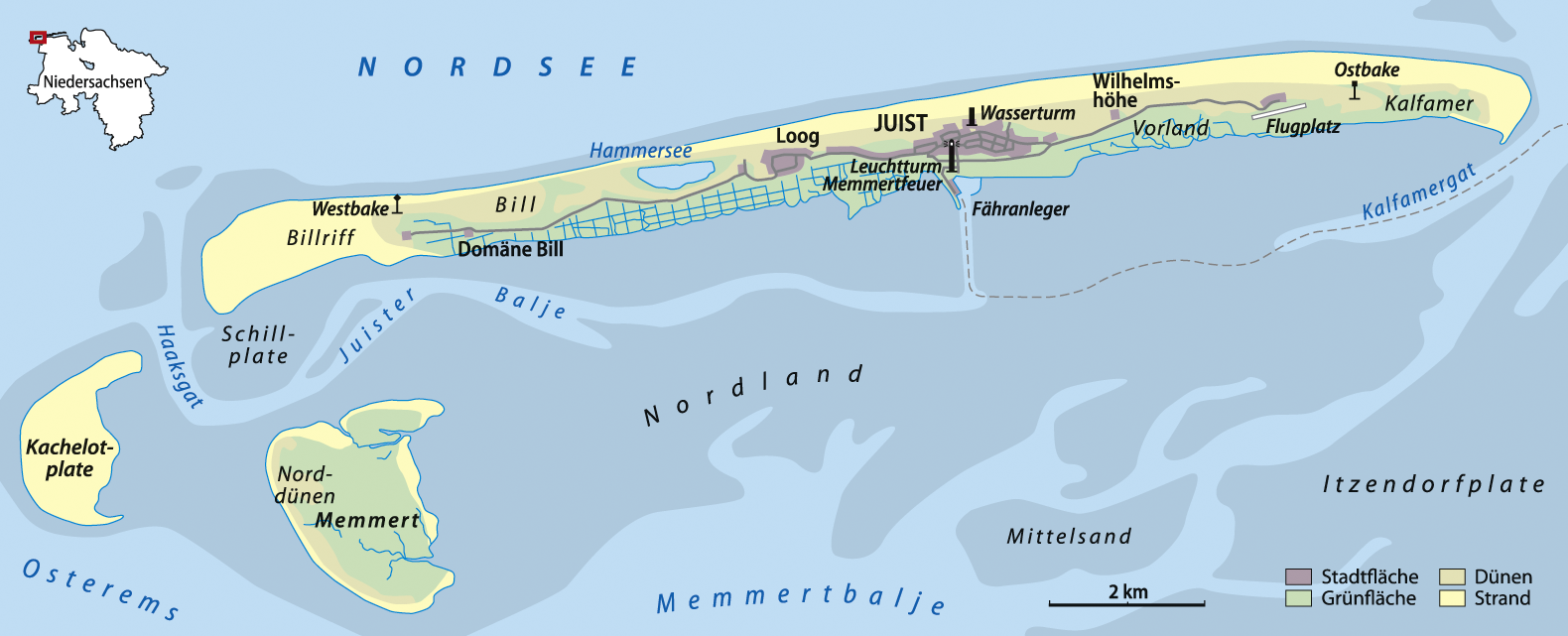
- Map of the Kachelotplate west of Juist

Geography
- Location: North Sea
- Coordinates: 53°38′42″N 6°49′8″E
- Archipelago: East Frisian Islands
- Area: 1.72 km^{2} (0.66 sq mi)
- Length: 3 km (1.9 mi)
- Width: 1 km (0.6 mi)
- Highest elevation: 2.5 m (8.2 ft)

Administration
- Germany

Demographics
- Population: 0

The Kachelotplate (German pronunciation: [ˈkaxəloːtˌplaːtə]) is a sandbar in the North Sea. It lies near the German coast, west of the island of Juist. Since 2003, enough stays above high tide that it can be called an island. Grass and dunes are settling there.

The new island is 2.5 kilometres long and up to 1.3 kilometres wide.

== Etymology ==
The island's name is derived from the French word cachalot ("sperm whale").

== Flora and fauna ==
Kachelotplate serves as a nesting area for many bird species and as a refuge for seals. It has dunes formed by wind, where vegetation has begun to grow.

== History ==
Kachelotplate is the youngest of the East Frisian Islands, although it was not officially recognized as an island until 28 July 2003. On that date, the Lower Saxony State Agency for Water Management, Coastal Defence and Nature Conservation (Niedersächsischer Landesbetrieb für Wasserwirtschaft und Küstenschutz) determined that the former sandbank of Kachelotplate had grown sufficiently large that it was no longer submerged even during the highest tides. It measured approximately 2.5 by 1.3 kilometres at the time.

== Future ==
Kachelotplate may eventually join with Memmert to form a single island, as the channel separating the two is becoming shallower. However, this process is expected to take several decades. At this time, an exceptionally severe storm combined with a strong storm surge could still temporarily submerge the island beneath the waters of the North Sea.
