= Great Break =

Great Break may refer to:

- Great Break (Soviet Union), Stalin's campaign of Soviet collectivization and industrialization
- Grande Coupure, the transition between the end of the Eocene and the beginning of the Oligocene, marked by large-scale extinction and floral and faunal turnover
- Groote Braak, a 17-18th century gap in a dam around Amsterdam
