= Harry Wheeler (disambiguation) =

Harry Wheeler (1858–1900) was a baseball player.

Harry Wheeler may also refer to:

- Harry A. Wheeler (1866–1960), President of the United States Chamber of Commerce
- Henry Lord Wheeler (1867–1914), American organic chemist at Yale University and member of the National Academy of Sciences
- Harry C. Wheeler (1875–1925), Arizona lawman
- Harry E. Wheeler (1907–1987), American geologist
- A. Harry Wheeler, American mathematician

== See also ==
- Harold Wheeler (disambiguation)
- Henry Wheeler (disambiguation)
