= Lütje Hörn =

East Frisian Island

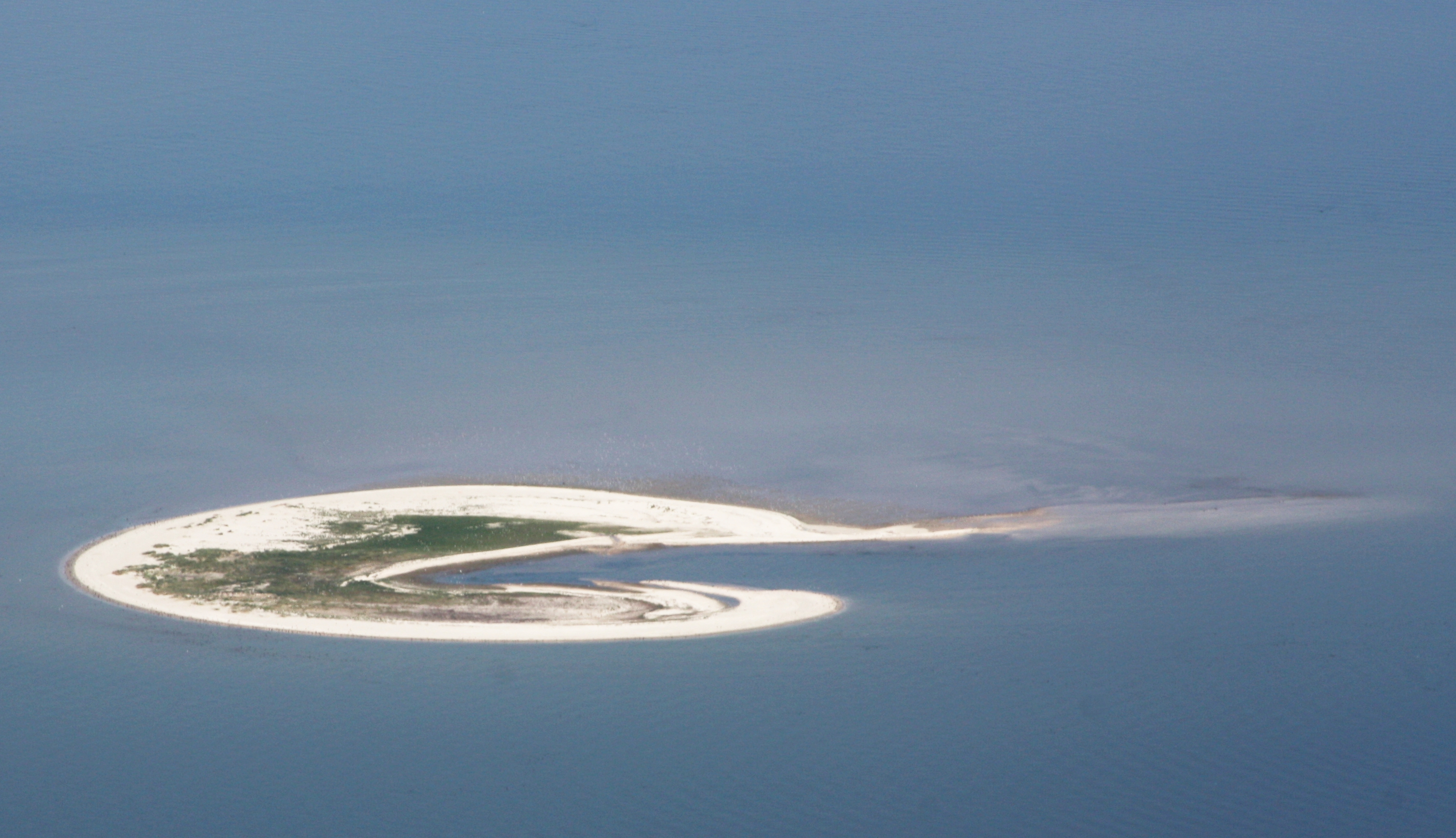
- Lütje Hörn in 2010

Geography
- Location: North Sea
- Coordinates: 53°35′24″N 6°52′01″E
- Archipelago: East Frisian Islands
- Area: 0.065 km^{2} (0.025 sq mi)

Administration
- Germany

Demographics
- Population: 0

Lütje Hörn (German pronunciation: [ˈlʏtjə hœʁn]) is an uninhabited East Frisian Island in the North Sea. It belongs to Germany and is located approximately 3 to 4 kilometres (1.9 to 2.5 mi) southeast of Borkum in the East Frisian Randzelwatt. Lütje Hörn is an unincorporated area of Leer district in Lower Saxony.

== History ==
Lütje Hörn was first mentioned in 1576 as Hooghe Hörn in a sailing guide. Since 1859 the island has been shown in topographical maps on the mudflats (Watt) southeast of Borkum.

== Geography ==
In contrast to all other East Frisian islands, Lütje Hörn is aligned in a north-south direction. This is due to the location of the island in the eastern channel of the Ems. Since the first documentary records the location of the island has moved about two kilometres further to the southeast. In just under 40 years, between 1961 and 1999, the island shifted about 600 metres (2,000 ft) east and 150 metres (490 ft) south. This corresponds to a speed of 15 metres (49 ft) per year eastwards and 5 metres (16 ft) per year southwards. Between 1999 and 2005, the island continued to migrate eastwards by another 100 metres (330 ft).

Due to erosion Lütje Hörn has continuously lost surface area. The size of the island was still relatively stable in the first half of last century: in 1891 it had an area of 61 hectares (150 acres) and, in 1937, 54 hectares (130 acres). In 1957 the high-water free area was still 58 hectares (140 acres), including about one acre of large dunes. The storm surge of February 1962 caused a significant loss of land and dune erosion, and further losses were incurred by the winter storm surges of 1989/1990. In 1987, the area above the mean high-water mark was only 23 hectares (57 acres), a few years later it had reduced to just 11 hectares (27 acres). According to the Lower Saxon Department for Water, Coastal and Nature Conservation (NLWKN), Lütje Hörn had a flood-free area of approximately 6.5 hectares (16 acres) in summer 2006.

== Access ==
The island can only be visited with the approval of the National Park Administration, because it belongs to Zone I of the Wadden Sea National Parks and is a bird protection island. There are no buildings on the island.
