= Henry Wheeler (signalman) =

English naval signalman (1925–2004)

Henry Charles Edward Wheeler
- Born: 29 July 1925; Bath, England
- Died: 22 November 2004 (aged 79); Sodbury, England
- Military career
- Allegiance: United Kingdom
- Branch: Royal Navy
- Service years: 1943–1946
- Rank: Signalman
- Conflict: World War II
- Other work: Tailor

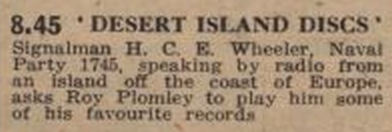
The episode's entry in the Radio Times, issue 1155, page 23

Henry Charles Edward Wheeler (29 July 1925 – 22 November 2004) was an English naval signalman during World War II.

Wheeler was born on 29 July 1925 in Bath, England, to Rose (née Snook) and Henry Arthur Wheeler, and was the eldest in a family of six. He was from Vernhan Grove in Bath, where his civilian role was as a tailor's assistant.

He joined the Royal Navy in 1943, and undertook his naval training at HMS Impregnable, a shore establishment at Plymouth. He went to France on 7 June 1944, the day after D-Day, and was later stationed in Rotterdam. While there, he began a romantic relationship with a Dutch woman, named Dine.

Shortly after the war's end, he appeared as a "castaway" on the BBC Radio programme Desert Island Discs, on 24 November 1945, at the age of 20. He was chosen to appear as he was serving, as part of Naval Party 1745, on an unspecified "small island off the European coast" – the nearest thing available to a real castaway. His appearance came one week after that of film star Deborah Kerr. One of the recordings he selected was "If You Were the Only Girl (In the World)" sung by Anne Ziegler and Webster Booth, calling it "a song I find myself singing when I think about my girl [Dine]".

He married a Miss Denboer before 1947, outside the UK. They had two sons.

It was later revealed that the island on which Wheeler was serving was Norderney — one of the East Frisian Islands off the north coast of Germany, where the British Forces Network provided the live outside broadcast, via Hamburg.

He died on 22 November 2004 in Sodbury, South Gloucestershire. He was cremated at Westerleigh Crematorium.
