= Lower Saxon Wadden Sea National Park =

National Park in Lower Saxony, Germany

- Nationalpark Niedersächsisches Wattenmeer
- IUCN category II (national park)
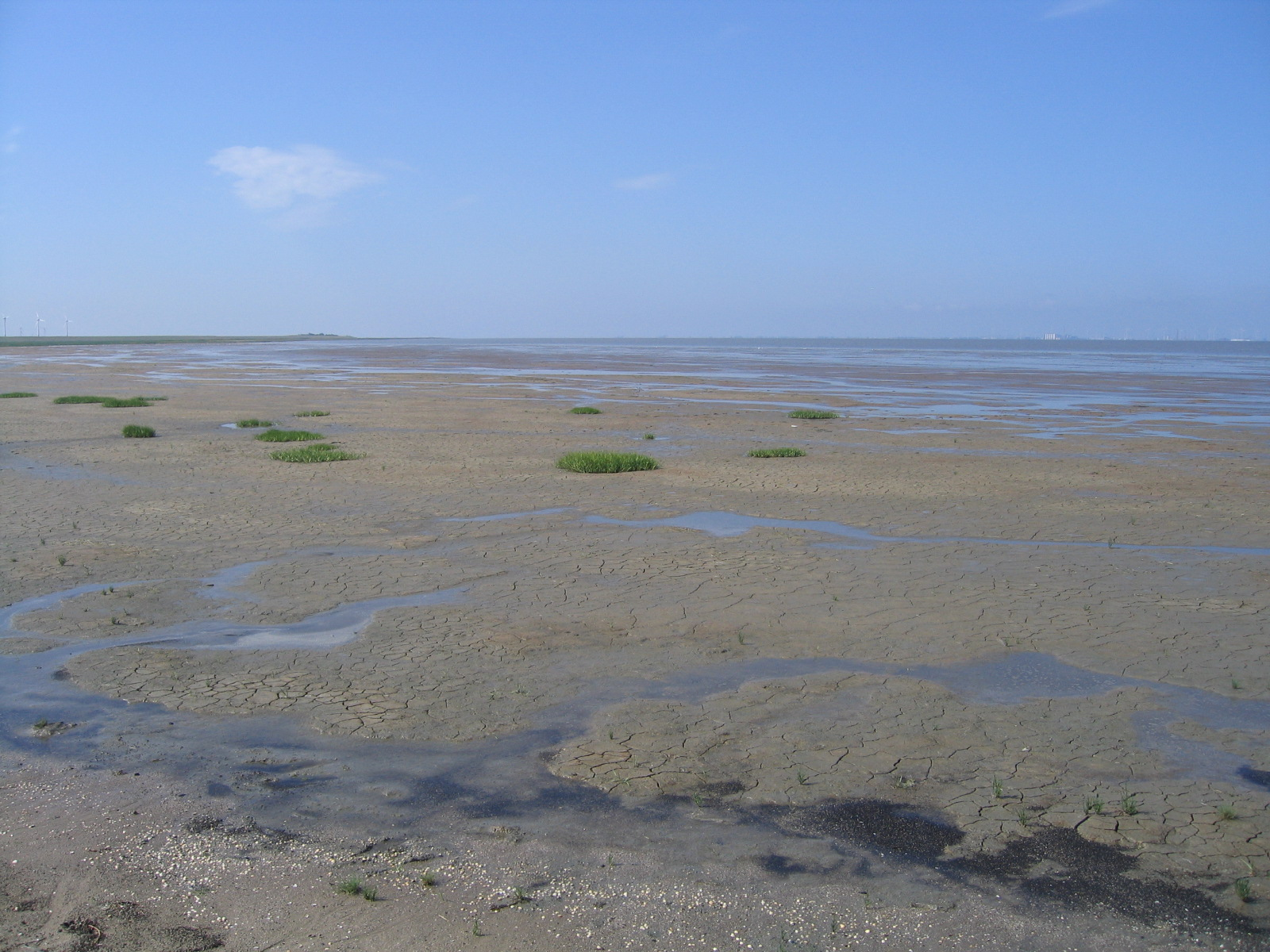
- The Pilsumer Watt from the Leyhörn peninsula, East Frisia

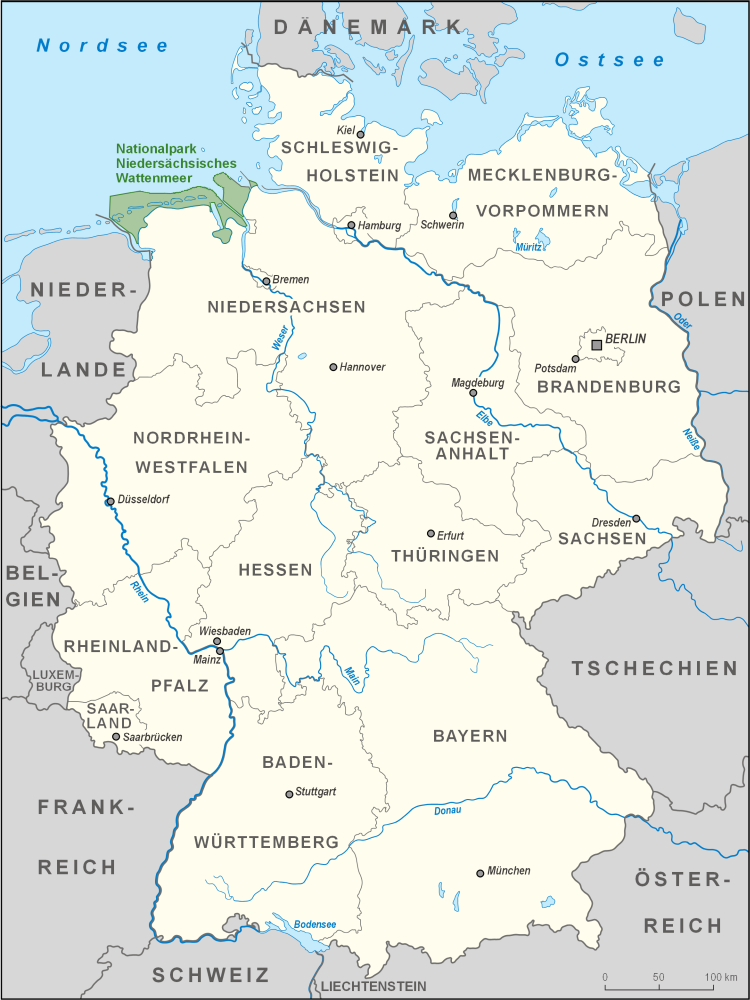
- Germany
- Location: Lower Saxony, Germany
- Coordinates: 53°42′N 7°20′E
- Area: 345.8 km^{2} (133.5 sq mi)
- Established: January 1, 1986
- World Heritage site: 2009

Ramsar Wetland
- Official name: Wattenmeer, Ostfriesisches Wattenmeer & Dollart
- Designated: 26 February 1976
- Reference no.: 82

Lower Saxon Wadden Sea National Park (German: Nationalpark Niedersächsisches Wattenmeer) was established in 1986 and embraces the East Frisian Islands, mudflats and salt marshes between the Bay of Dollart on the border with the Netherlands in the west and Cuxhaven as far as the Outer Elbe shipping channel in the east. The national park has an area of about 345,800 hectares (1,335 sq mi). The National Park organisation is located in Wilhelmshaven. In June 2009, the National Park became a UNESCO World Heritage Site along with the Schleswig-Holstein Wadden Sea and the Dutch Wadden Sea, highlighting its unique intertidal ecosystem and high biodiversity.

== Ecology ==
The habitats to be protected by this park include the mudflats, salt marshes, beaches, dunes and estuaries on the North Sea. Special attention is given to the wildlife and flora typical of the Wadden Sea of which the park forms a part.

The coast of the North Sea is unusually flat. The seabed descends in places only a few centimetres per kilometre. Twice daily the tide brings sand, clay and silt into the Wadden Sea. Dunes, formed by the wind out of fine grains of sand from the exposed mudflats, characterise the coast.

The Wadden Sea is the second most productive ecosystem after the tropical rainforest—only the latter surpasses the Wadden Sea in terms of its living biomass. The forms of life found in the Wadden Sea include diatoms, snails, worms, mussels and shrimp. A typical inhabitant of the sandy mudflats is the lugworm, which lives in a U-shaped tube under the surface of the mud.

More than 10,000 animal and plant species exist in the park, and up to 4,000 specialize in the unusually food-rich habitat of the Wadden Sea. For example, shelduck live on the snails, which are found in hundreds of thousands on the surface of the flats. The approximately 180,000 birds of north-western Europe's shelduck population also spends their moulting season from July to September in the Wadden Sea, as do about 200,000 eider; and about 1,000 pairs of eiders use the mudflats of the North Sea as a breeding area. Most of them breed on the island of Amrum.

At the same time, the Wadden Sea is a resting place for breeding birds from northern countries that feed here to build up the fat reserves they need for successful breeding. For example, about 10–12 million waders, geese, ducks, and gulls gather in the whole Wadden Sea area.

Seals may also be observed on the sandbanks of the Wadden Sea and the adjacent salt marshes, sandy beaches and sand dunes. The salt marshes are a breeding area for the pied avocet and terns as well as a habitat for the sea holly and sea lavender that bloom in summer. The typical plant of the dunes is the beachgrass, which anchors the dunes with its extensive root system.

== History of the national park ==
Since the Ramsar Convention of 1971, the present-day national park regions and the Dollart Bay have been protected as "wetlands of international importance".

In 1979 Hans-Joachim Augst and Holger Wesemüller submitted a report, which developed a zoning model based on the different levels of importance of the various areas of the Wadden Sea that were worth protecting. The 1982 Lower Saxon regional development programme subsequently set the development of a national park for the "East Frisian Islands and coast" as a state planning objective. This idea was taken up in 1983, when plans for a comprehensive national park began. In early 1984 the cabinet decided to approve the national park in principle and on 1 January 1986 the national park regulation came into force.

According to the UNESCO "man and biosphere" programme, the entire national park became recognized as a biosphere reserve in 1992 (see Lower Saxony Wadden Sea Biosphere Reserve).

All zones of the national park are designated as bird reserves under the EU's Birds Directive, and zones I and II are designated as Special Areas of Conservation under the Habitats Directive and therefore fall under the protection of Natura 2000 guidelines.

Initially the national park was protected by a 1986 regulation; this was superseded in 1999 by a law. But by 11 July 2001, the law was amended by the Lower Saxon State Parliament so that many areas were removed from the scope of the national park in order to support tourism or had their zoning downgraded. To compensate, an area of sea in front of the islands of Borkum and Baltrum and the former nature reserve in the eastern part of the Dollart were added to the national park. This increased the size of the protected area from 240,000 hectares to almost 280,000 hectares.

In January 2002 the East Frisian conservation group Wattenrat Ost-Friesland complained to the EU Commission in Brussels about the removal or downgrading of more than 80 areas in order to support tourism; these were predominantly on the islands of East Frisia. The appeal was incorporated by the Commission into ongoing infringement proceedings against Germany (Complaint No. 2002/4099, Ref: ENV A2/MD/avdm D (2005) 6096). After more than four years, the EU Commission informed the Wattenrat-Ostfriesland in October 2006 that the complaint was closed "because the Federal Republic of Germany has now identified sufficient areas which are proposed as Special Areas of Conservation (Az: ENV A.2/MD/pd D 2006 21 119). The conservation group argued that this did not make sense from a nature conservation perspective, as the national park belonged to a previously designated special area of conservation and bird reserve and that, contrary to the provisions of the Natura 2000 directive, it was now in a worse state of repair. It claimed the EU was supporting largely economically motivated changes to the national park to provide additional tourist facilities at the cost of valuable plant habitats and bird breeding or migration sites.

In July 2006 the twentieth anniversary of the Wadden Sea National Park was celebrated on the beach at Neßmersiel on the initiative of the state of Lower Saxony. The Lower Saxon nature conservation organizations under the auspices of the WWF, marked the 20-year anniversary with a critical "national park balance", which highlights its many conflicting uses in detail.

The Wadden Sea National Park is listed by the IUCN under its "Category II, National Parks".

In 2008, the Wadden Sea in Lower Saxony and Schleswig Holstein was proposed to UNESCO for nomination as a UNESCO World Heritage Site. The President of the German UNESCO Commission since 2003 is Walter Hirche (FDP), the former Economic Minister in Lower Saxony from 2003 to 2009.

Prior to the nomination of the Wadden Sea as a UNESCO World Heritage Site, an inspection visit was held by a senior officer of the Swiss-based International Union for the Conservation of Nature (IUCN) was held in summer 2008, together with representatives of the tourism industry in and around the Wadden Sea. Following this, there were newspaper reports claiming that the UNESCO nomination was an "internationally effective marketing tool for the tourism industry" and that additional restrictions imposed for conservation purposes were not involved. On 26 June 2009, the Wadden Sea National Park was recognised as a UNESCO World Heritage Site in Seville, along with the Dutch Wadden Sea and the Schleswig-Holstein Wadden Sea National Parks. Hamburg and Denmark have so far refused to allow their mudflats to be nominated.

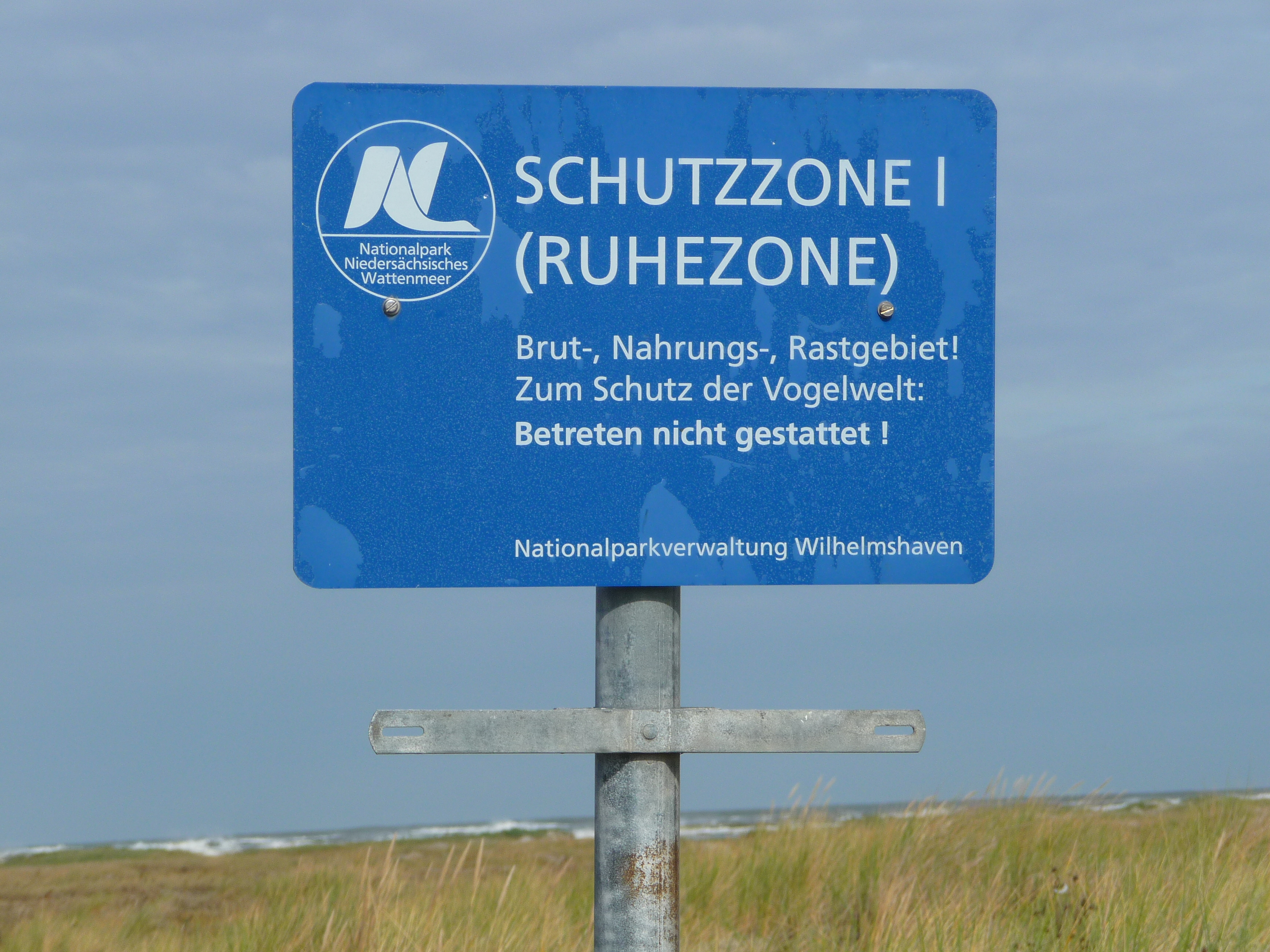
Notice board on the island of Juist

== Zoning ==
The national park is divided into three zones with different protection status.

- Zone I: the most strictly protected quiet zone accounts for about 68.5% of the area and may only be entered in a few areas, such as along paths or as part of guided mudflat walks, whatever the time of year.
- Zone II: The intermediate zone forms 31.0% of the area and may, with the exception of designated bird reserves, be entered at any time of year on designated routes. The bird reserves may only be entered on marked trails during the main breeding, feeding and resting times of the birds from 1 April to 31 July.
- Zone III: The recreation zone has the smallest area, making up only 0.5% of the total, and is primarily intended for recreational purposes.

== Islands ==
The national park includes land on the islands of Baltrum, Borkum, Langeoog, Juist, Mellum, Memmert, Minsener Oog, Norderney, Spiekeroog and Wangerooge. Only the actual settlements and infrastructure on the inhabited islands are completely excluded from the national park's protection. In addition, certain areas that are used primarily for recreation (for example, stretches of beach) have limited protection under Zone III.

== See also ==
- Wadden Sea
- Schleswig-Holstein Wadden Sea National Park
- Hamburg Wadden Sea National Park
- Wadden Sea Conservation Station
- Mudflat hiking

== Films ==
- Im Nationalpark Wattenmeer. Documentary, 45 min., Germany, 1998, by Jens-Uwe Heins und Michael Sutor, Production: Komplett-Media-GmbH, Grünwald (ISBN 3-89672-492-4),
