= Wadden Sea National Parks =

Coordinates: 53.902097°N 8.290216°E

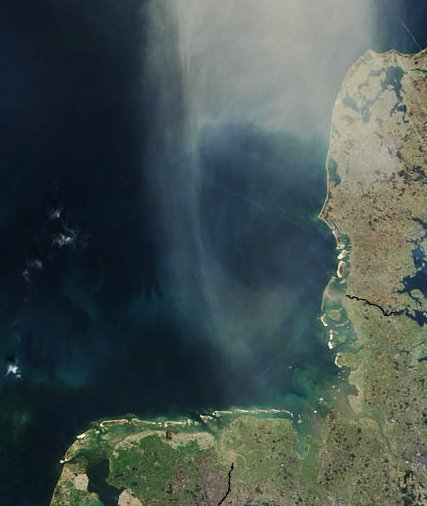
Satellite view of the German Bight and the Wadden Sea

The Wadden Sea National Parks in Denmark, Germany and the Netherlands are located along the German Bight of the North Sea. In Germany and Denmark they also mark the area of the UNESCO World Heritage Site of the Wadden Sea. Divided from each other by administrative borders, they form a single ecological entity. The purpose of the national parks is the protection of the Wadden Sea ecoregion.

== Denmark ==
- Wadden Sea National Park (Nationalpark Vadehavet), from Blåvandshuk to Rudbøl in Denmark

== Germany ==
- Schleswig-Holstein Wadden Sea National Park, comprising the west coast of Schleswig-Holstein and the North Frisian Islands
- Hamburg Wadden Sea National Park, extending from the mouth of the Elbe to the tiny islands of Neuwerk and Scharhörn, part of Hamburg
- Lower Saxony Wadden Sea National Park, comprising the northern coast of Lower Saxony and including the East Frisian Islands

== Netherlands ==
- Lauwersmeer National Park consists of the southern and eastern parts of the Lauwersmeer in the Netherlands
- Schiermonnikoog National Park covers the majority of the island Schiermonnikoog
- Dunes of Texel National Park is located on the Dutch island of Texel and includes dune systems.

== Gallery ==
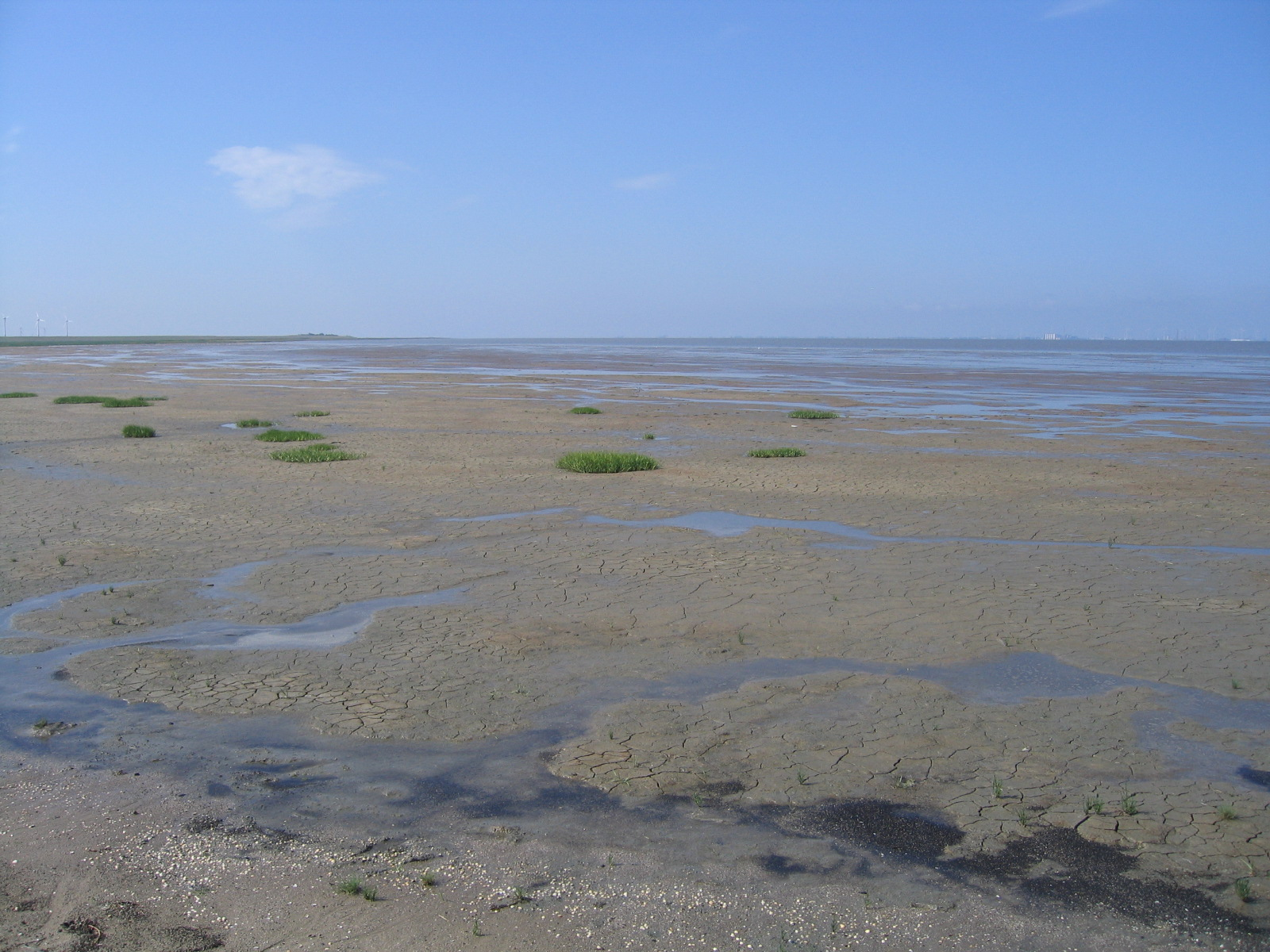
The mudflats of the Pilsumer Watt near Greetsiel, Germany

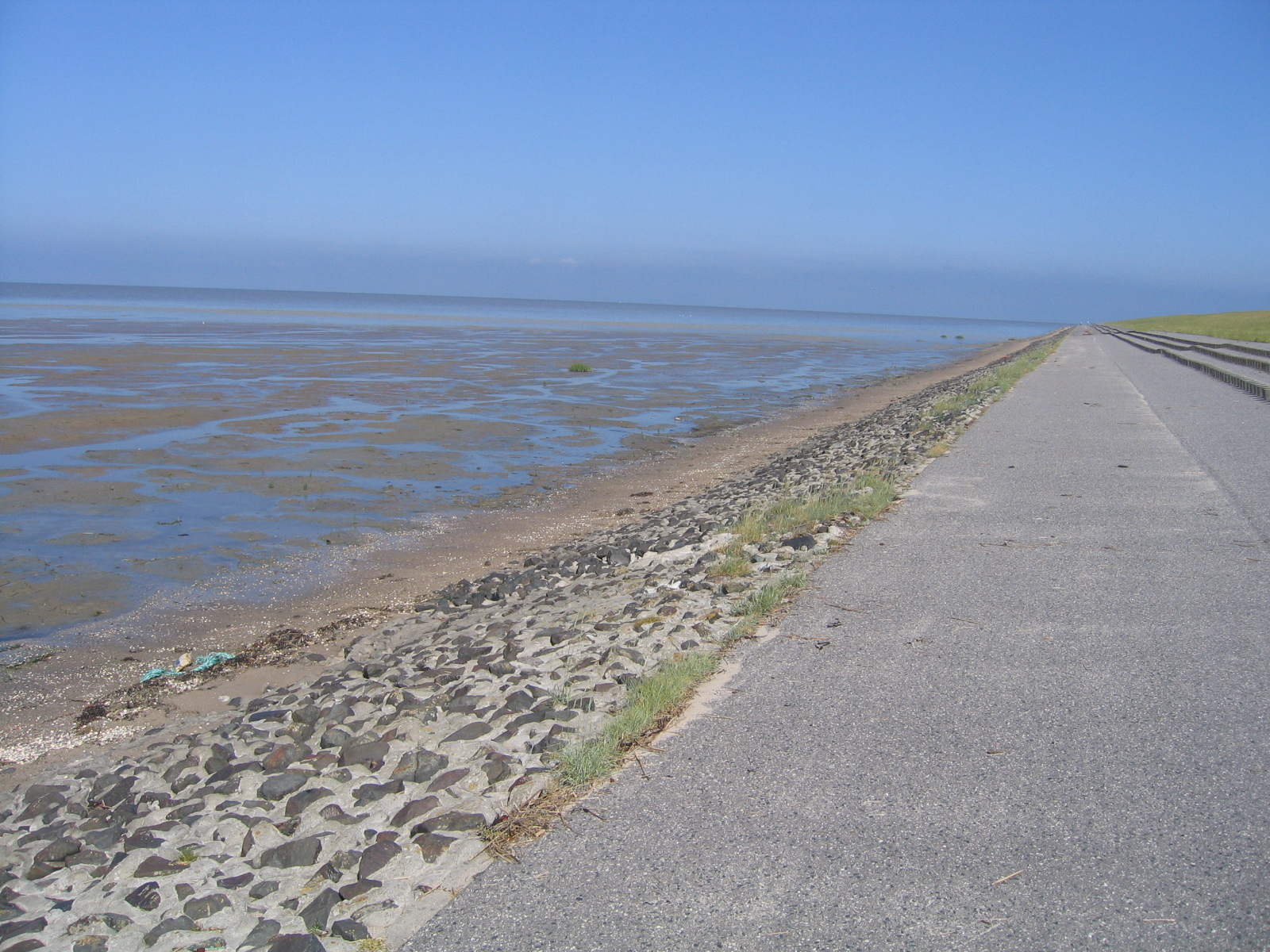
The mudflats of the Greetsieler Nacken along the western side of the Leyhörn near Greetsiel

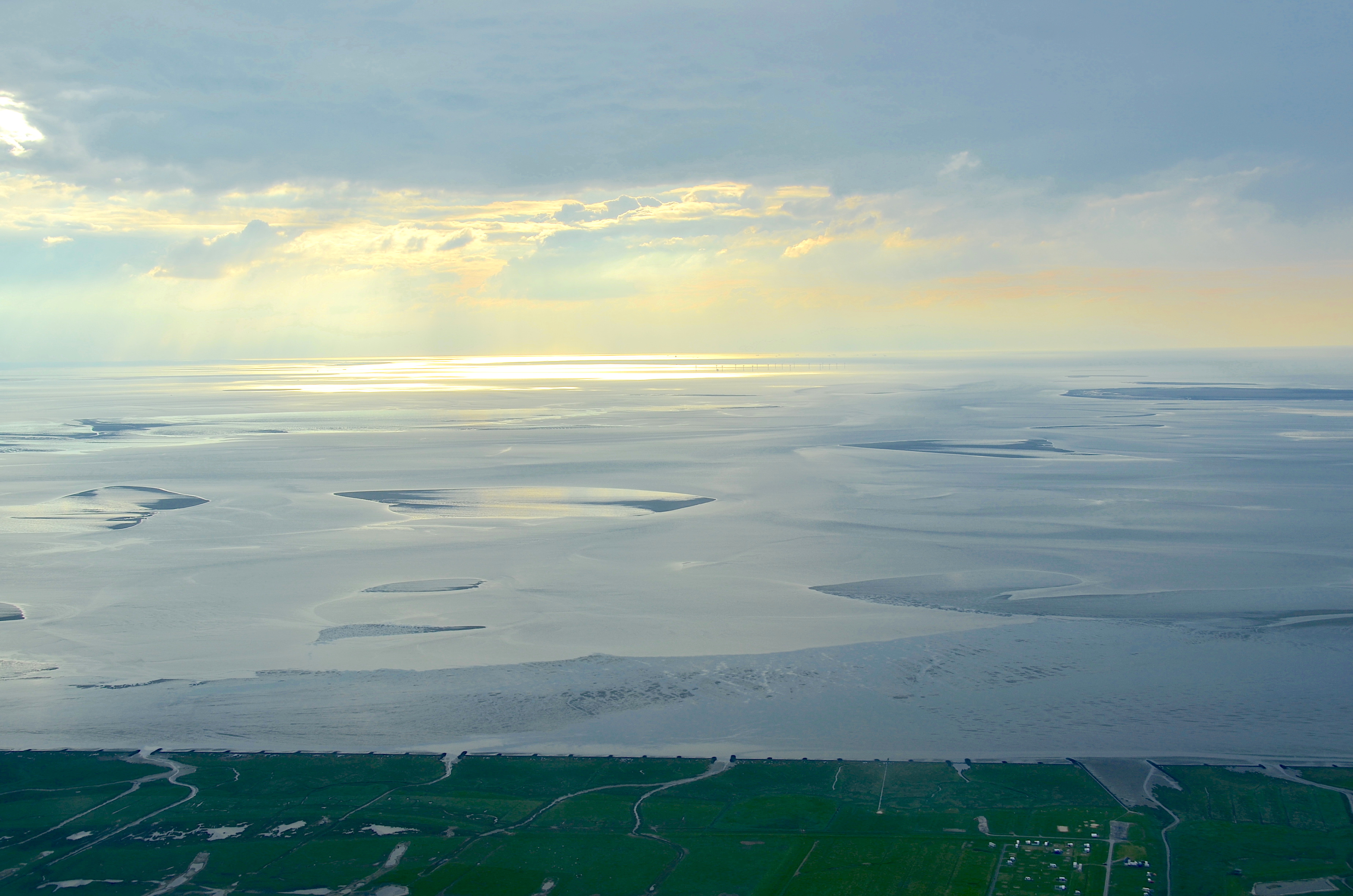
Shoals at Mudflats of Lower Saxon Wadden Sea National Park

== See also ==
- Wadden Sea / UNESCO Official Website
- Wadden Sea
