= St. Peter's flood =

Two storm tides that struck the coasts of Netherlands and Germany in 1651

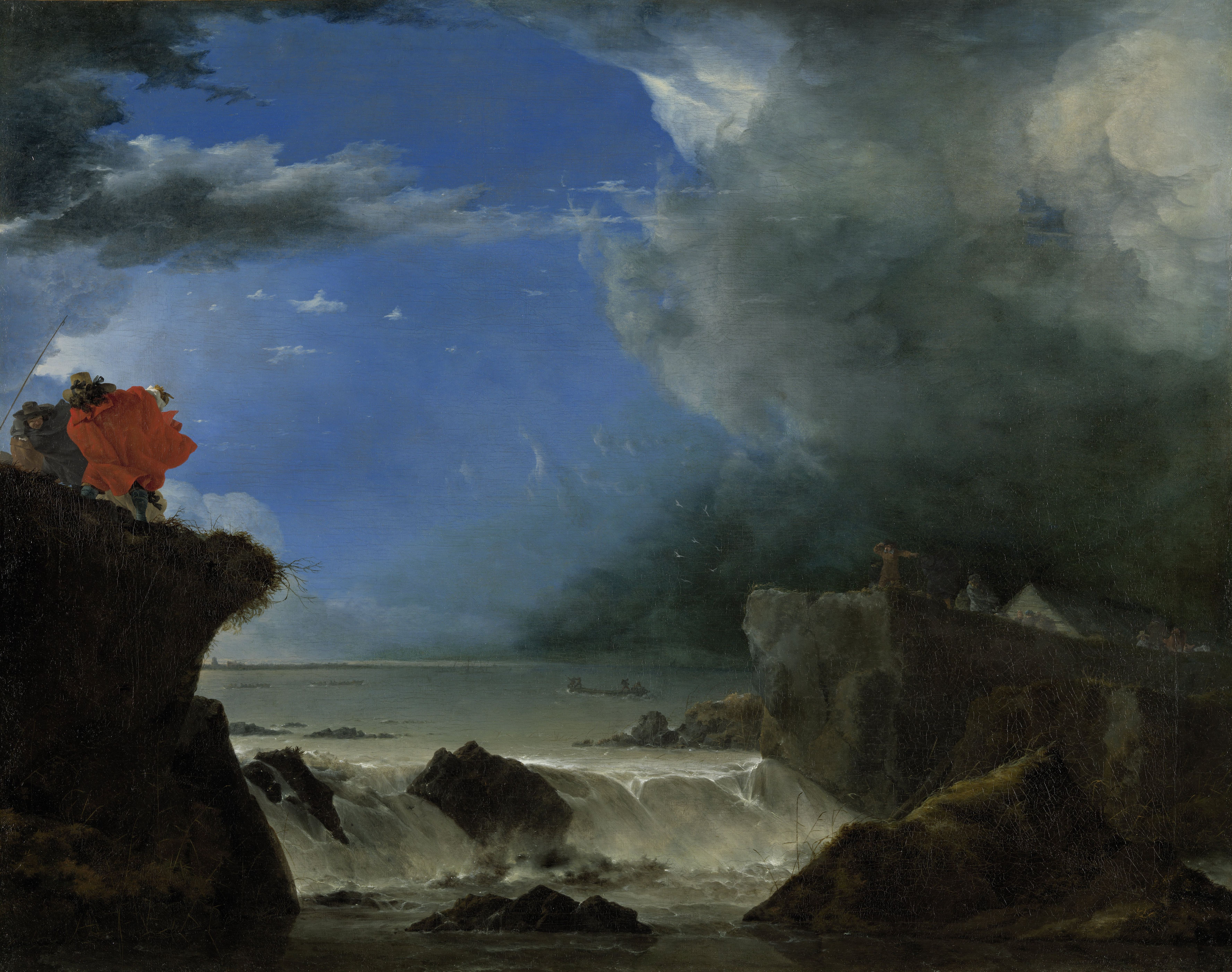
The Breach of the Saint Anthony's Dike near Amsterdam by Jan Asselijn

St. Peter's flood (Dutch: Sint-Pietersvloed, German: Petriflut) refers to two separate storm tides that struck the coasts of Netherlands and Northern Germany in 1651. During the first storm tide, on 22 February, the East Frisian island of Juist was split in two. During the second disaster, on 4–5 March, the city of Amsterdam was flooded.

In the past, the two storm tides were thought to have been a single event. The two disasters were confused with each other because two different calendars were in use at the time. The Julian calendar was still in use in Northern Germany and some parts of the Netherlands, while the Gregorian calendar had already been adopted in Holland, Zeeland and other parts of the Netherlands.

The year 1651 was something of an annus horribilis for flooding, with many disastrous floods in Europe. In the Netherlands, for instance, another storm tide that struck during the night of 25–26 February broke through a number of dikes and flooded large parts of the eastern Netherlands.

== The storm tide on 22 February 1651 ==
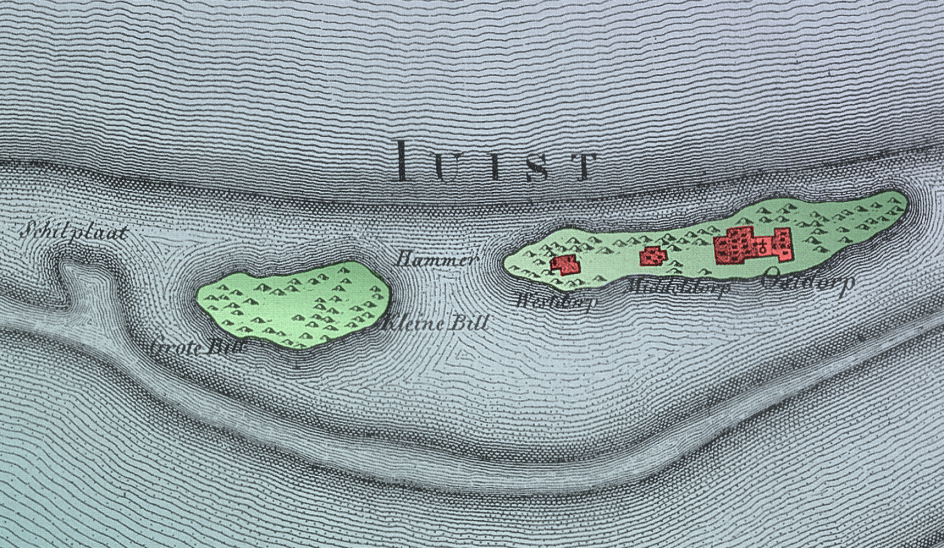
Map of Juist island drawn in 1805 by Karl Ludwig von Lecoq. The 'Hammer' channel indicates the separation of the old island.

The storm tide on 22 February struck the North Sea coast in Northern Germany, including the German Bight. Thousands were drowned; according to some accounts the disaster claimed 15,000 lives.

The storm tide broke through the dunes of the islands Juist and Langeoog and split Juist in half. Only in 1932 would the two halves of Juist be reunited. The western half of the island of Buise disappeared, leaving only the eastern half, now known as Norderney. According to some sources, however, the western half of Buise did not disappear until 1690. The foundations of Juist's church were undermined by the floodwaters, causing the church to collapse in 1662.

The coastal towns of Dornumersiel, Accumersiel, and Altensiel were devastated by the storm tide. The floodwaters reached the church mound (terp) of Fulkum; many corpses were buried on the mound. The flood even reached the Altes Land, south of the city of Hamburg, leaving the lake of Gutsbrack.

== The storm tide on 4–5 March 1651 ==
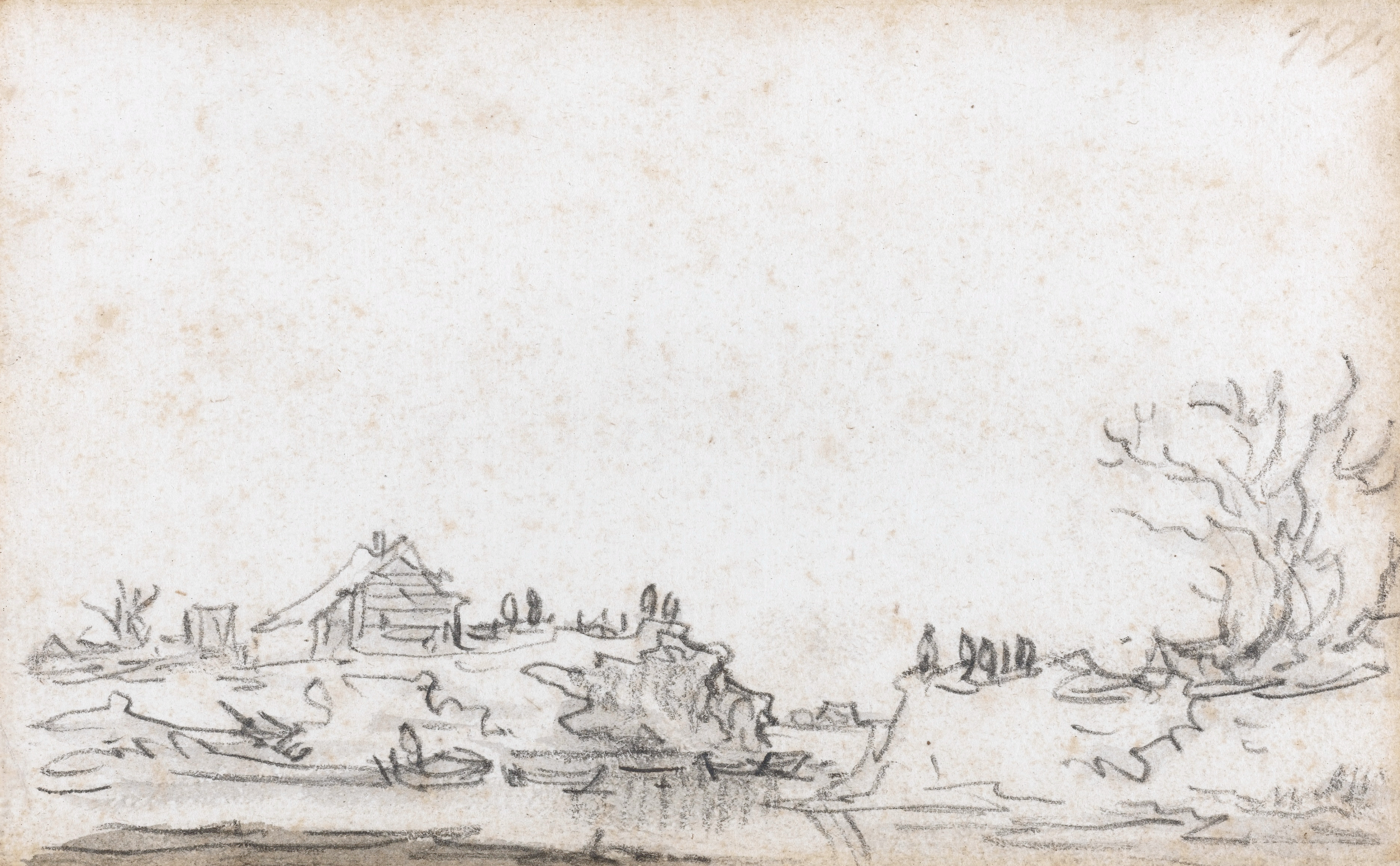
The breach in the dyke at Houtewael

The storm tide during the night of 4–5 March 1651 primarily struck the Dutch Zuiderzee coast. In the Netherlands, it was considered the heaviest storm tide to hit the shores in 80 years.

The dikes protecting the east of Amsterdam broke in a number of places, flooding the Watergraafsmeer polder and much of the city of Amsterdam. Two gaps struck in the Zeeburgerdijk left two ponds in what is now the Indische Buurt neighbourhood of eastern Amsterdam. The Groote Braak ("Great Break") or St. Jorisbraak ("St. George's Break") was filled in 1723 and the smaller Braak was filled in 1714. The storm tide also left a small lake, the Nieuwe Diep (Amsterdam), which was never filled in and is still in existence.

In the Watergraafsmeer polder, five people were killed. After the disaster, the dikes were restored and the floodwater was pumped out again and on 15 July 1652, the inhabitants of the Watergraafsmeer paraded through their polder to celebrate that it was dry once again.

The storm tide also struck elsewhere in Holland. In Scheveningen, Katwijk and Den Helder, houses were carried away by the waves. The newly constructed dike between the cities of Amsterdam and Haarlem was breached, flooding the area around Haarlem. A dike was also breached at Edam.

The northern provinces of Friesland and Groningen were affected as well. In Friesland, the storm tide broke through the dikes surrounding the Dokkumer Grootdiep (a canal connecting Dokkum to the sea), leaving a small, round pond, the Mallegraafsgat or Sint Pitersgat, which is still in existence. The disaster spurred plans to close off the Dokkumer Grootdiep from the sea with sluice gates. In Groningen, the Dollart bay was struck by the storm tide.
