= Harold Wheeler =

Harold Wheeler may refer to:

- Harold Alden Wheeler (1903–1996), American engineer
- Harold Wheeler (musician) (1943–2026), American musician

== See also ==
- Harry Wheeler (disambiguation)
