= East Frisian Islands =

Chain of German islands in the North Sea

Coordinates: 53°44′N 7°25′E

Native name: Ostfriesische Inseln (German) Eastfryske eilannen (West Frisian) Aastefräiske Ailounds (Saterland Frisian)
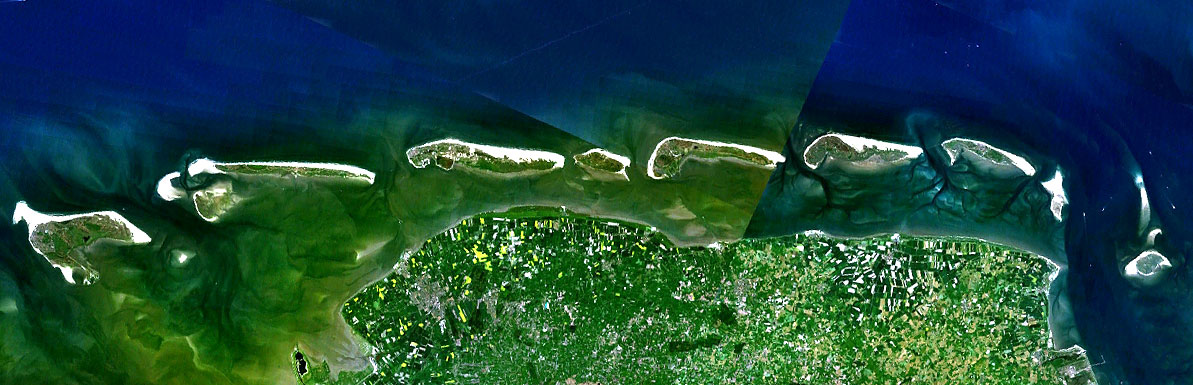

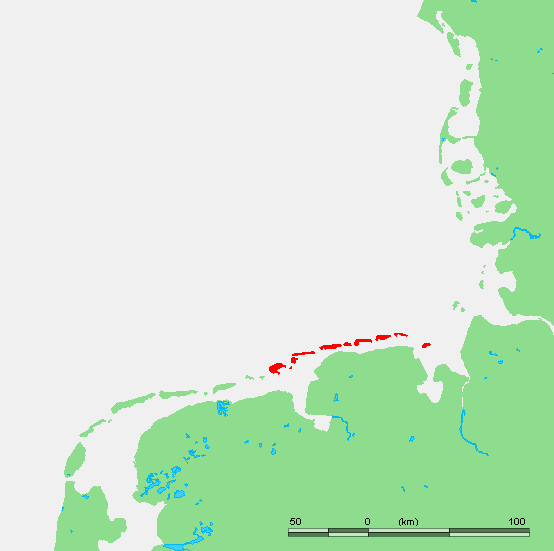

Geography
- Location: Wadden Sea
- Total islands: 12
- Major islands: Borkum, Norderney

Administration
- Germany
- State: Lower Saxony
- Districts: Leer; Aurich; Wittmund; Friesland

Demographics
- Ethnic groups: Germans, Frisians

The East Frisian Islands (German: Ostfriesische Inseln, pronounced [ˈɔstˌfʁiːzɪʃə ˈɪnzl̩n]; West Frisian: Eastfryske eilannen; Saterland Frisian: Aastefräiske Ailounds) are a chain of islands in the North Sea, off the coast of East Frisia in Lower Saxony, Germany. The islands extend for some 90 kilometres (56 mi) from west to east between the mouths of the Ems and Jade / Weser rivers and lie about 3.5 to 10 kilometres (2.2 to 6.2 mi) offshore. Between the islands and the mainland are extensive mudflats, known locally as Watten, which form part of the Wadden Sea. In front of the islands are Germany's territorial waters, which occupy a much larger area than the islands themselves. The islands, the surrounding mudflats and the territorial waters (The Küstenmeer vor den ostfriesischen Inseln nature reserve) form a close ecological relationship. The island group makes up about 5% of the Lower Saxon Wadden Sea National Park.

The largest island by surface area is Borkum, located at the western end of the chain; the other six inhabited islands are from west to east: Juist, Norderney with the largest town in the islands, Baltrum, Langeoog, Spiekeroog and Wangerooge. There are also four other small, uninhabited islands: Lütje Hörn east of Borkum, Memmert and Kachelotplate southwest of Juist, Minsener Oog, a dredged island southeast of Wangerooge, and Mellum at the eastern end of the island chain which, following the boundary revision by the Federal Office for Nature Conservation, no longer belongs to the East Frisian Islands, but to the mudflats of the Elbe-Weser Triangle (Watten im Elbe-Weser-Dreieck).

== Overview of the islands and sand flats ==
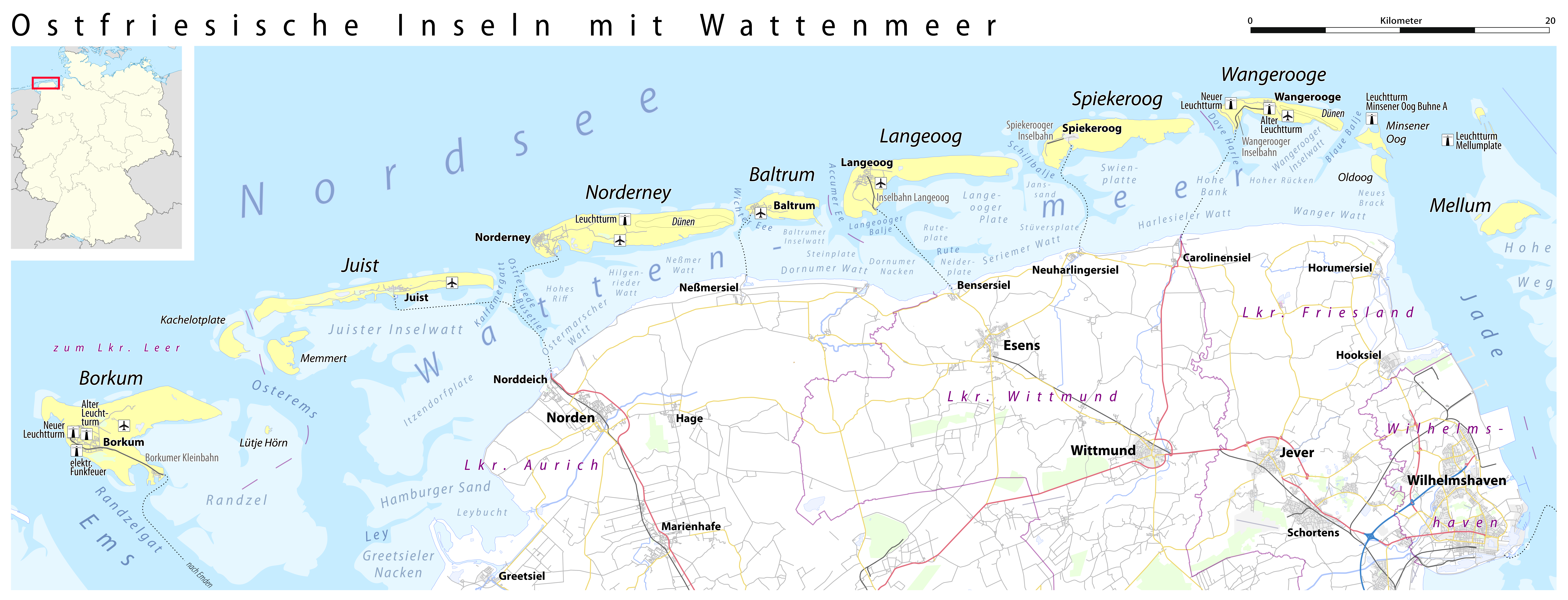
The chain of the East Frisian Islands off the coast of Lower Saxony

The following table contains basic information about the islands and sand flats (Sandplaten). The uninhabited and unparished sand flats are highlighted in yellow.

Coat of arms	Island/Sand flat	Municipality	District	Area in km^{2} (2004/05)	Distance to the mainland in km (2004)	Population as at: 31 December 2008	Population density per km^{2}
	Borkum	Town of Borkum	Leer	30.74	10.5	5,186	169
	Kachelotplate	not municipalised		no data		uninhabited	−
	Lütje Hörn	Island of Lütje Hörn¹	Leer	0.1	12.5	uninhabited	−
	Memmert	North Sea island of Memmert¹	Aurich	4.3	13	uninhabited	−
	Juist	Juist	Aurich	16.43	8	1,696	103
	Norderney	Town of Norderney	Aurich	26.29	3	5,810	221
	Baltrum	Baltrum	Aurich	6.5	4.5	488	75
	Langeoog	Langeoog	Wittmund	19.67	5	1,953	99
	Spiekeroog	Spiekeroog	Wittmund	18.25	6.5	781	43
	Wangerooge	Wangerooge	Friesland	7.94	6,5	923	116
	Minsener Oog artificially dredged	Butjadingen²	Wesermarsch	2.2	3.5	uninhabited	−
	Mellum³	Butjadingen²	Wesermarsch	4.9	6	uninhabited	−
East Frisian Islands				134.35	−	16,837	129
¹ unparished area ² former parish of Langwarden, which was incorporated in 1974 into Butjadingen (today the Gemarkung of Langwarden) ³ east of the outer Jade, after the boundary revision by the Federal Agency for Nature Conservation no longer part of the East Frisian Islands, but belongs to the mudflats in the Elbe-Weser Triangle Watten im Elbe-Weser-Dreieck.

Norderney is the remaining part of Buise, which was almost entirely engulfed by the sea in the 17th century. Lütje Hörn east of Borkum is in constant danger of being washed away. In 2003 the German Coastal Defence (NLWK) announced that the sandbank Kachelotplate can now be called an island too, because it is no longer regularly flooded by high tide. However, it is not larger than 2 km^{2} and will remain unsettled. Kachelotplate is located north of the mouth of the Ems river.

Most of the islands do not allow cars. The exceptions are Borkum and Norderney, which are also the most crowded islands. There are no bridges connecting the mainland with the islands. Each island is accessible by ferry.

Borkum and Norderney, the Nazi labour camps on Alderney, were named after the islands.

The islands and the surrounding sea are part of the Lower Saxony Wadden Sea National Park.

== Effects of storms and currents ==
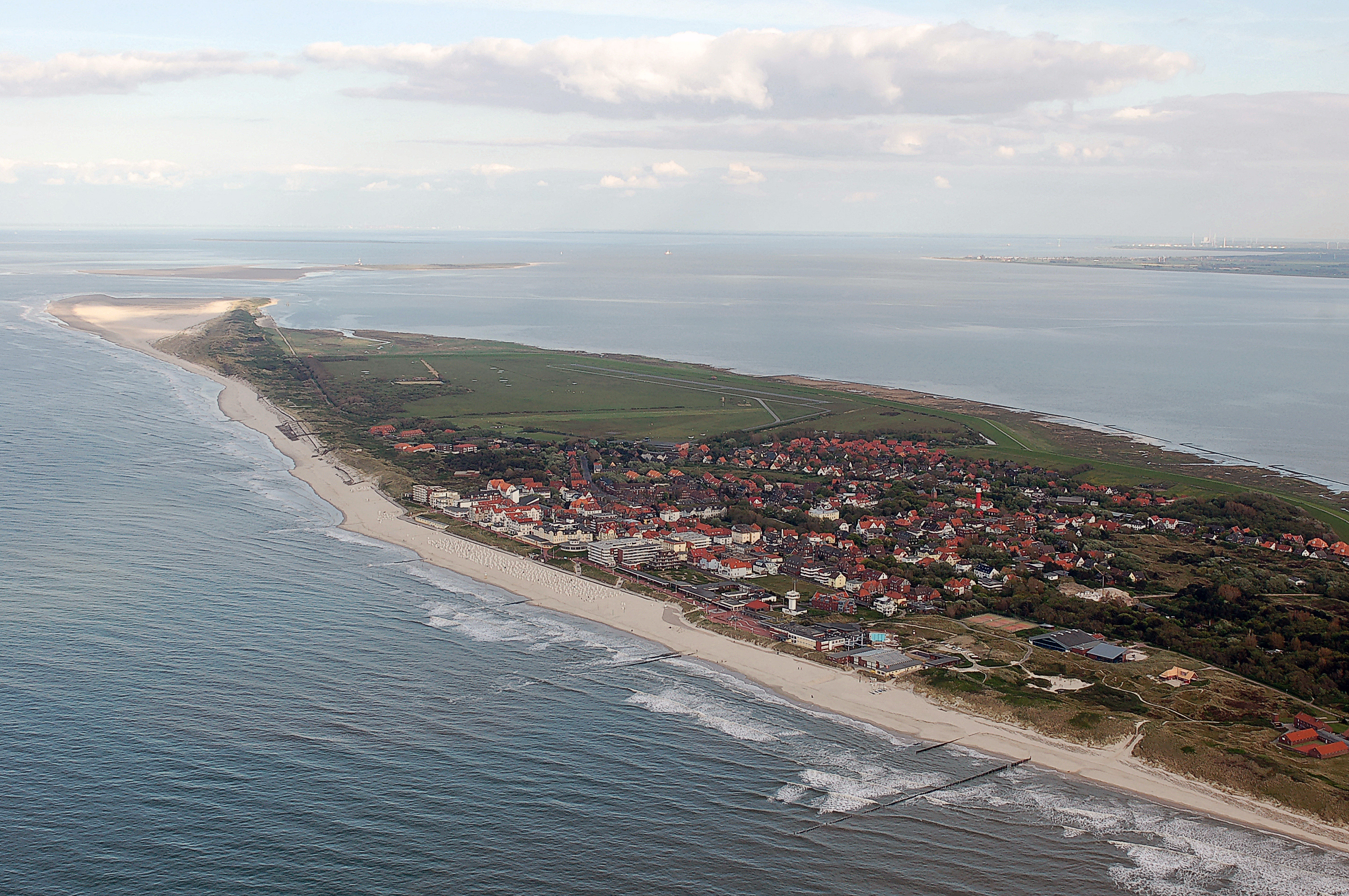
Aerial view of Wangerooge

Even though today they are established islands, some of them continue to be in motion. On the East Frisian island of Juist for example, since the year 1650 there are five different proven sites for the church, as the spot for rebuilding the church had to keep pace with the ever-moving island. At times, Juist even consisted of two islands, which eventually grew back together. The island of Wangerooge in the last 300 years has moved a distance equivalent to its own length to the east, its church tower, destroyed at the outbreak of World War I apparently moving from east to west.

In this process, land is slowly eroded on the western coasts, while sediments are deposited on the eastern coasts. As a result, western coasts are increasingly protected by human action. The canals between the islands serve as passages for the tides, so that in these places the scouring action of current prevents the islands gradually joining one to another.

=== Storm surges ===
The East Frisian Islands and its population have been subject to storm surges for centuries. Prominent examples include the Christmas Flood 1717, the February Flood 1825 and the New Years Flood 1855 each of which caused many fatalaties. More recent examples are the Storm Surge of 1962 and the All-Saints Day Flood 2006. Both of these storm surges hit multiple East Frisian Islands and led to severe destruction. Due to global warming, storm surges have increased in frequency which multiplies the destruction and amount of sand being swept away by them.

=== Sea level rise ===
The worldwide sea level rise resulting from global warming, also presents an imminent threat to the existence of large parts of the East Frisian Islands. Located only a few meters above sea level, researchers warn that Borkum, Juist, Norderney, Spiekeroog and Langeoog as well as large parts of Föhr could be flooded one day. The slowly shrinking land on the islands is also one of the reasons for the climb in real estate prices. The residents of the islands try to mitigate the consequences of sea level rises and storm surges with the help of expensive technological processes e.g. land reclamation or preliminary sand fills.

== Economy and politics ==
Number of Tourists 2024
Island	Guests	Overnight stays
Borkum	300.889	2.245.256
Juist	134.375	869.305
Norderney	573.785	3.778.172
Baltrum	57.187	416.446
Langeoog	233.659	1.567.576
Spiekeroog	87.490	613.925
Wangerooge	123.987	880.186
total	1.511.372	10.370.866

Nowadays the main economic pillar of the islands is almost exclusively tourism. They are popular travel destinations with well-developed tourist infrastructure which leads to the islands all being state-recognized sea spa towns. During the Covid-19 pandemic on the islands, like many other tourist destinations, struggled with the sudden loss of income and so the dangers of an economy solely based on tourism became visible.

Traditionally, the islands' economy was based on fishing and agriculture. Both became economically unimportant or almost obsolete toward the end of the 20th Century. Norderney's milk industry, for example, was given up in 1978. In small measure, hay is still produced today as food for horses. Another minor economic branch parallel to tourism is the health sector with medical rehabilitation centers, as well as balneological and other therapeutic institutions.

The biggest East Frisian Island, Borkum, had to face a loss of over 20 percent of its jobs when its marine base closed in 1996. Many islanders were relocated to other military bases.

Wangerooge and Minsener Oog are geographically counted as part of the East Frisian Islands, but politically they belong to the district of Friesland and not East Frisia.

East of the islands right before the Weser estuary is the sand bank Hoher Knechtsand located, which used to be an island. Other islands in Lower Saxony which are not counted as part of the East Frisian Islands are the artificial islands Langlütjen I and II.

== Cooperation ==
Due to their similarities, different forms of social, political and economic collaboration have developed among the seven populated islands. Under the name Insulaner unner sück ("Islanders among themselves"), cultural associations have been meeting annually since 1977 on one of the islands for joint events and discussions. The islands' mayors, spa town directors (German: Kurdirektoren) and council members also meet once or twice per year for the so-called insularen Erfahrungsaustausch ("exchange of experiences among islanders"). In some cases, they also take joint positions on political issues, such as opposing the building of coal power plants in Eemshaven and Wilhelmshaven, as well as speaking out against natural gas drilling in the North Sea.

=== Joint company ===
After leaving the Nordsee GmbH (German for 'North Sea GmbH'), the seven populated islands founded the Ostfriesische Inseln GmbH (OFI - German for 'East Frisian Island GmbH') in 2017 as a joint destination marketing company. The company's aim is to streamline tourist marketing and represent the islands' interest politically and socially. Shareholders of the company are the local spa town administrations and shipping companies. Since 2025, Corina Habben and Wilhem Loth are CEOs of the company. The predecessor of the OFI was the Werbegemeinschaft Ostfriesische Inseln GbR (German for 'Marketing Community East Frisian Islands GbR').

== In popular culture ==
A German invasion fleet masses in the Frisian Islands in the pre–World War I invasion thriller The Riddle of the Sands.

German students memorize the names of the seven inhabited islands by using a mnemonic device:

Welcher Seemann liegt bei Nanni im Bett? ("Which seaman lies with Nanni in bed?")
Wangerooge, Spiekeroog, Langeoog, Baltrum, Norderney, Juist, Borkum (east to west)

== See also ==
- Frisia
  - West Frisian Islands
  - North Frisian Islands
- Frisian languages
- Frisians
- East Frisian Low Saxon
- List of islands of Germany
- List of ferry boats of the East Frisian Islands
