= Minsener Oog =

East Frisian island

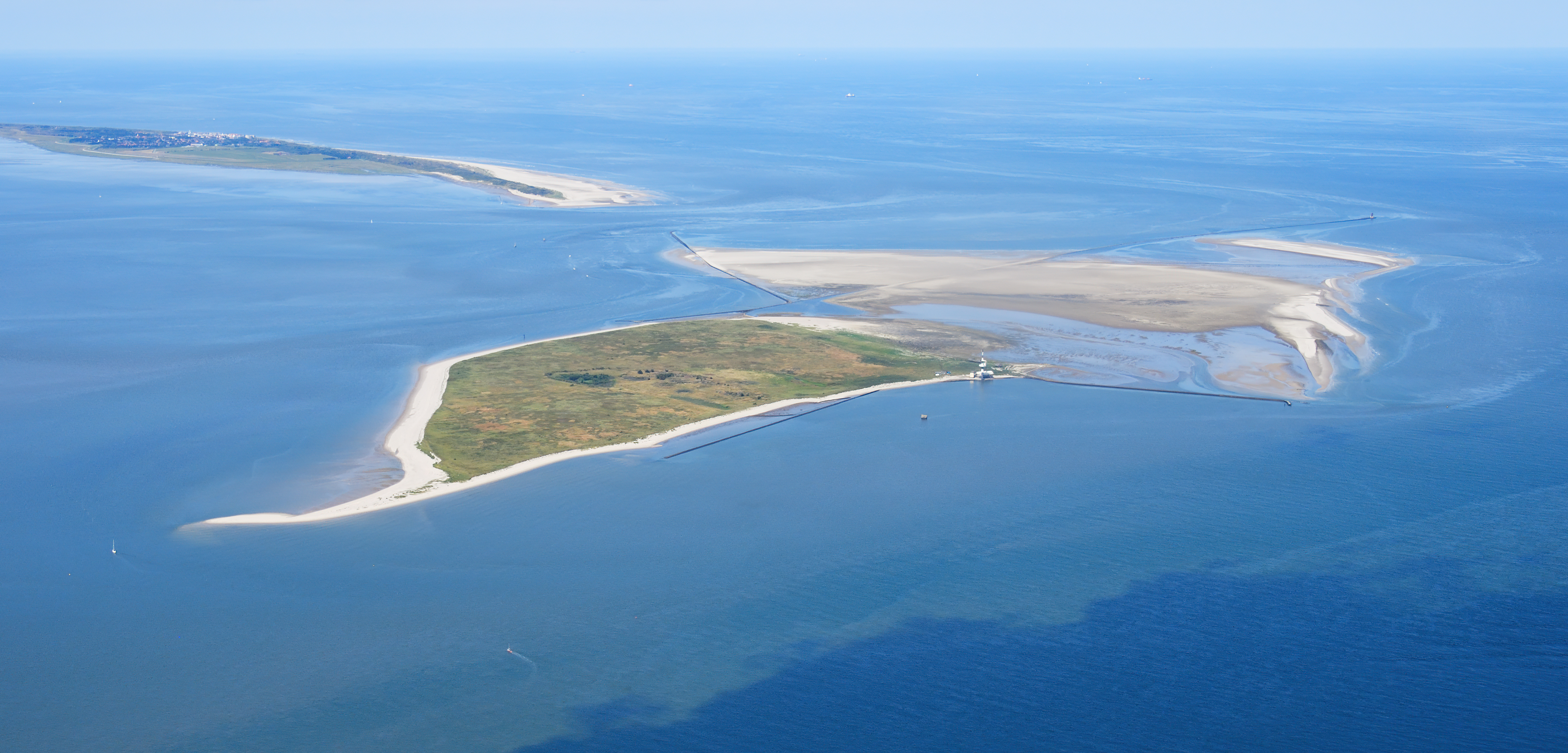
- Aerial view of Minsener Oog
- Interactive map of Minsener Oog

Geography
- Location: North Sea
- Coordinates: 53°45′47″N 8°0′48″E
- Archipelago: East Frisian Islands
- Area: 3.7 km^{2} (1.4 sq mi)
- Length: 4.5 km (2.8 mi)
- Width: 1.5 km (0.93 mi)
- Highest elevation: 12 m (39 ft)

Administration
- Germany

Demographics
- Population: 0
- Minsener Oog Buhne C Lighthouse
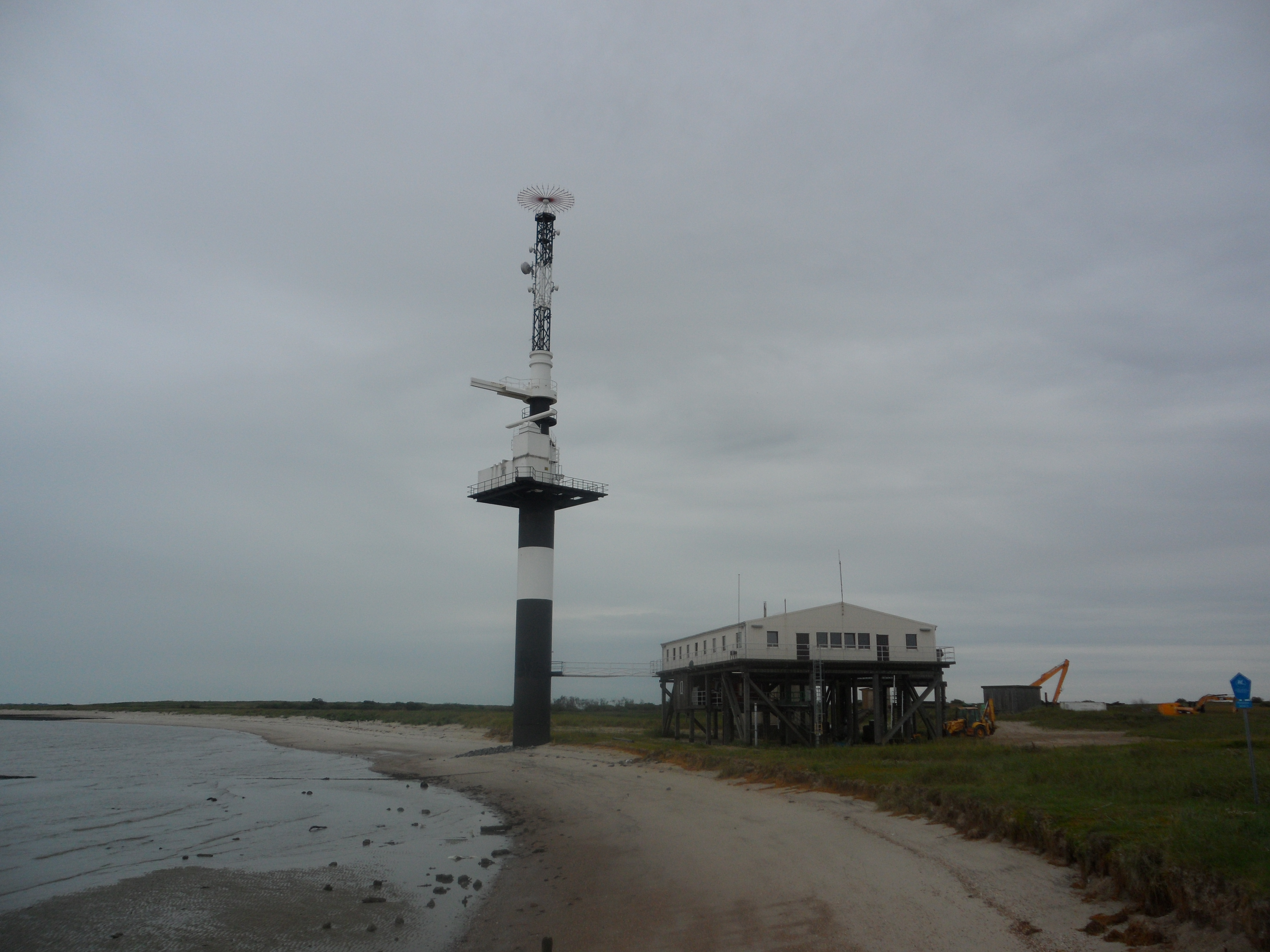
- Constructed: 1976
- Construction: concrete tower
- Height: 53 m (174 ft)
- Shape: cylindrical tower with a communications and radar tower on the summit
- Markings: tower with white and black horizontal bands
- Deactivated: 1998
- Focal height: 22 m (72 ft)
- Characteristic: Fl WRG 4s

Minsener Oog (German pronunciation: [ˈmɪnzənɐ ˈʔoːk]), also Minser Oog or Minsener Oldeoog, is an uninhabited East Frisian island that belongs to the parish of Wangerooge in the north German district of Friesland in the state of Lower Saxony. It has been artificially enlarged through the construction of groynes.

== Location ==
The island is located just two kilometres southeast of the island of Wangerooge, from which it is separated by the creek of Blaue Balje, and four kilometres north of the mainland. The nearest towns on the mainland are Minsen and Schillig. The island's landowner is the Wilhelmshaven Water and Shipping Authority (Wasser- und Schifffahrtsamt Wilhelmshaven or WSA).

== Name ==
The name of the isle comes from the village of Minsen which lies opposite it on the mainland. There is a legend that Minsen was originally established on the island of Minsener Oog. The fishermen of the village caught a mermaid with the lower body of a fish, which then had the village drowned by a flood in revenge. In commemoration of the legend, there is in Minsen a bronze sculpture of the Minsen Seewiefken, which is also the emblem on the coat of arms for the parish of Wangerland.

== History ==
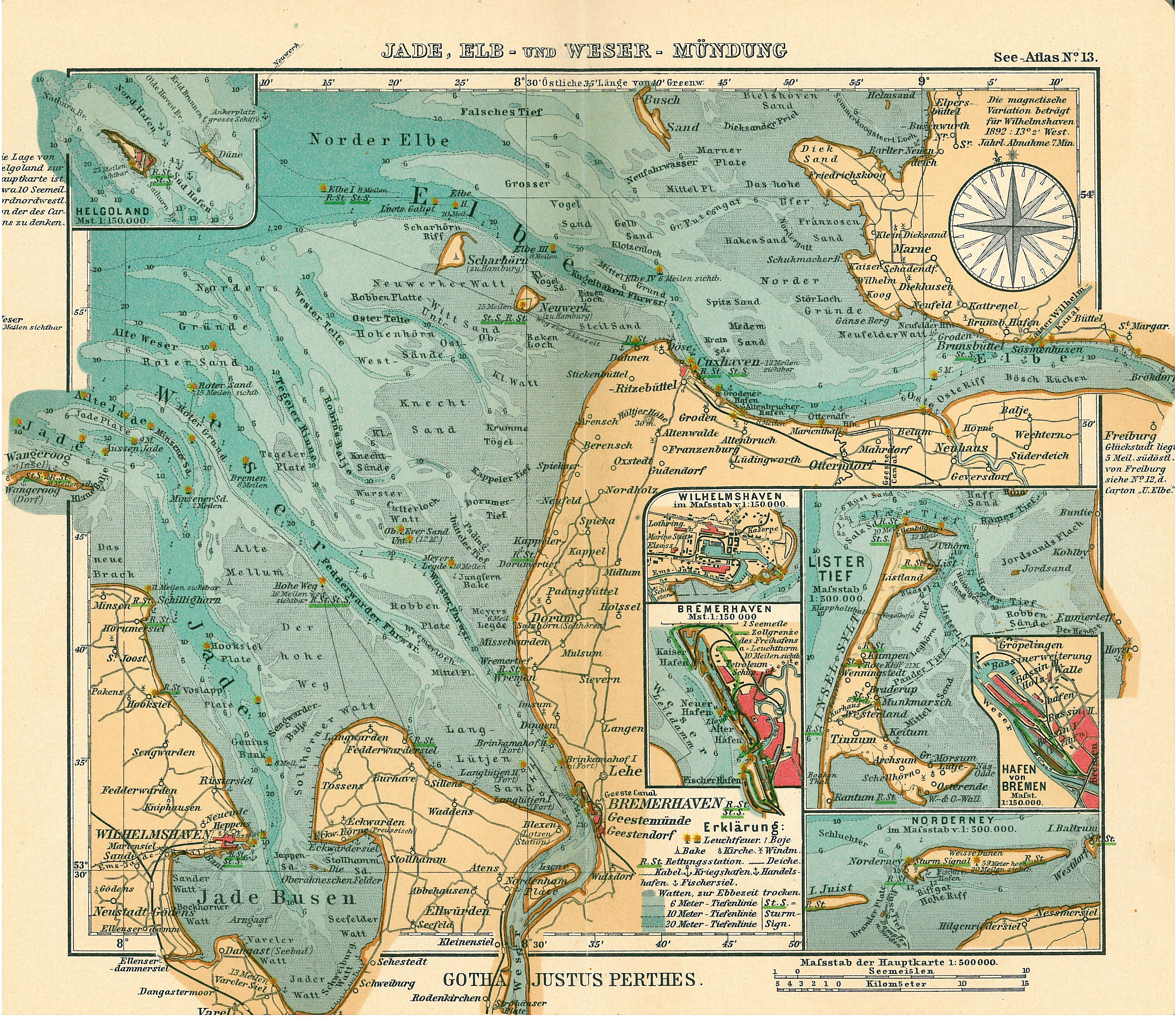
On a 1906 map only the Minsener Sand lighthouse is shown

Minsener Oog was formed from the Minsener Oog sandbanks and the Olde Oog or Steen Plate sandbank, 200 to 300 metres to the south. In 1906 the Wilhelmshaven Marine Construction Authority erected groynes and embankments on the Olde Oog and dams to prevent the channel of the River Jade from silting up. This was intended to keep the channel to Wilhelmshaven clear of sand drifting from east to west, especially for the fleet of the German Imperial Navy. On the original 7 km^{2} sand bank of Olde Oog there was a small area of dunes, as on Minsener Oog. By building long connecting groynes the sand was held back and formed a "fore-dune" which quickly established itself as a breeding ground for seabirds.

Originally it was planned to connect Wangerooge with Minsener Olde-Oog, to prevent the erosion of Wangerooge. In the 1930s, this project was temporarily reinstated, but the events of war prevented further work in this direction. After the Second World War, the British occupation forces tried to render Wilhelmshaven unusable as a naval base by letting the Jade estuary silt up completely. A major embankment on Minsener Oog was blown up, but no further action was taken.

== Present state ==
To keep the Jade channel clear, a new large-scale dune island was formed in the 1970s. Between 1975 and 1978 about 10 million m^{3} of dredged material was dumped from the Jade channel thus increasingly enlarging the southern part of the island. This now has sand dunes up to 12 m high and is covers an area of about 370 hectares. Through the planting of beachgrass, erosion could be largely contained. The island is 4.5 km long from north–south, and up to 1.5 km wide.

After the Second World War, the Wilhelmshaven Water and Shipping Authority (WSA) was particularly active on the Minsener Oog. Two groyne wardens did shift work looking after the various maintenance tasks on the island. In addition to the radar tower built in 1976, a larger accommodation facility was erected in the form of pile dwellings for the WSA's staff.

At the end of the groyne A in the north there is still a small flak tower made of concrete, which was built during the Second World War and served as a lighthouse until 1998. In 1998, the Wilhelmshaven Water and Shipping Authority (WSA) gave up its permanent presence on the island for reasons of cost and only deploys staff as needed.

Since the automation of the beacon, however, only a bird warden from the Mellumrat resides on Minsener Oog during the summer (breeding season), who shares the living quarters of the water and shipping authority. The island is considered one of the most important research areas for the Institute of Avian Research (Institut für Vogelforschung).

== Gallery ==
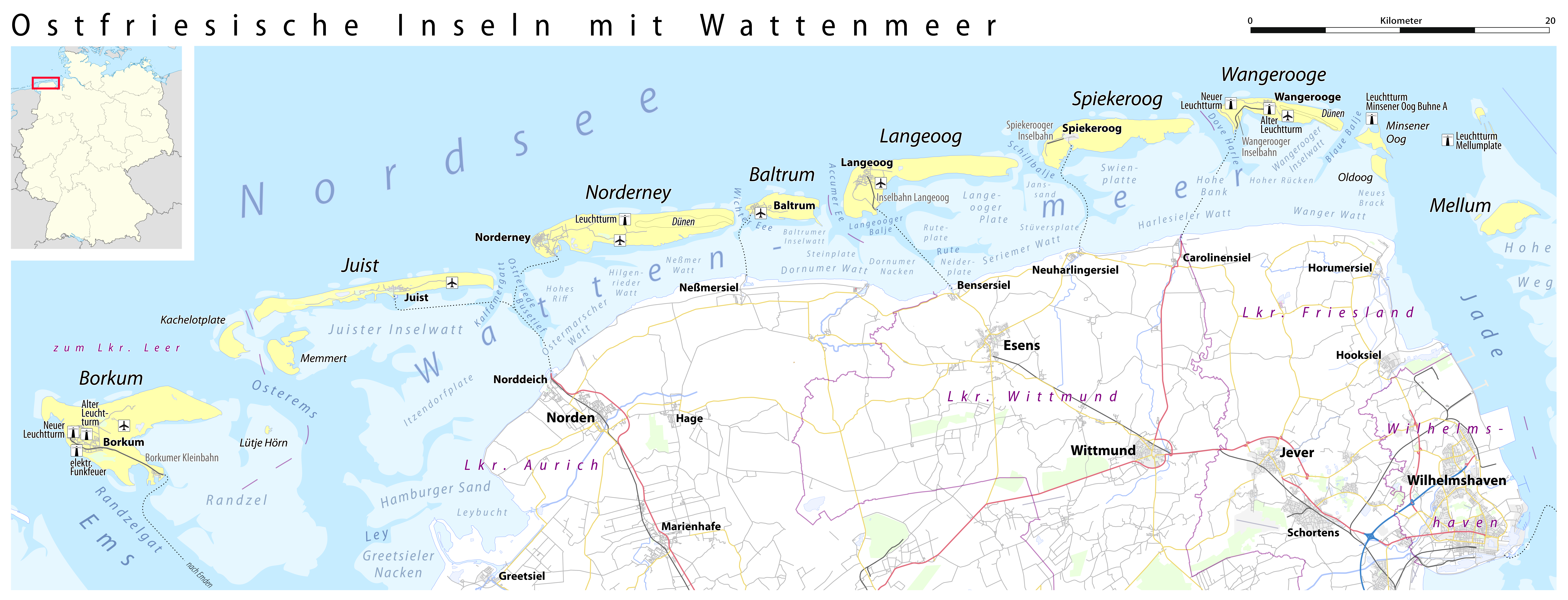
Location of Minsener Oog within the East Frisian Island

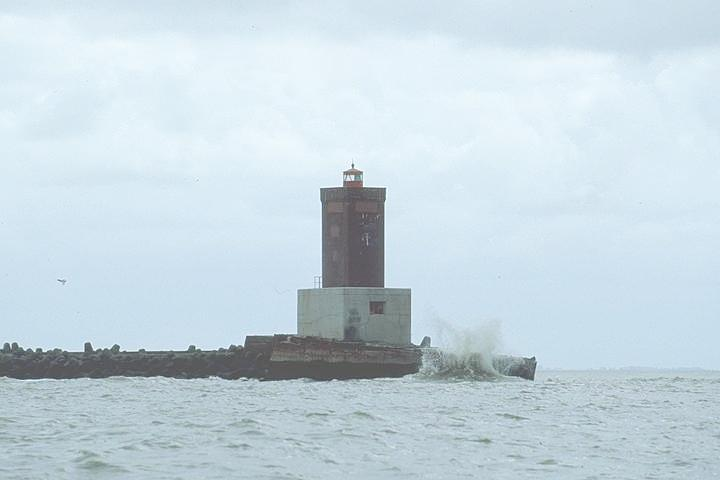
Lighthouse in the north at the end of Groyne A

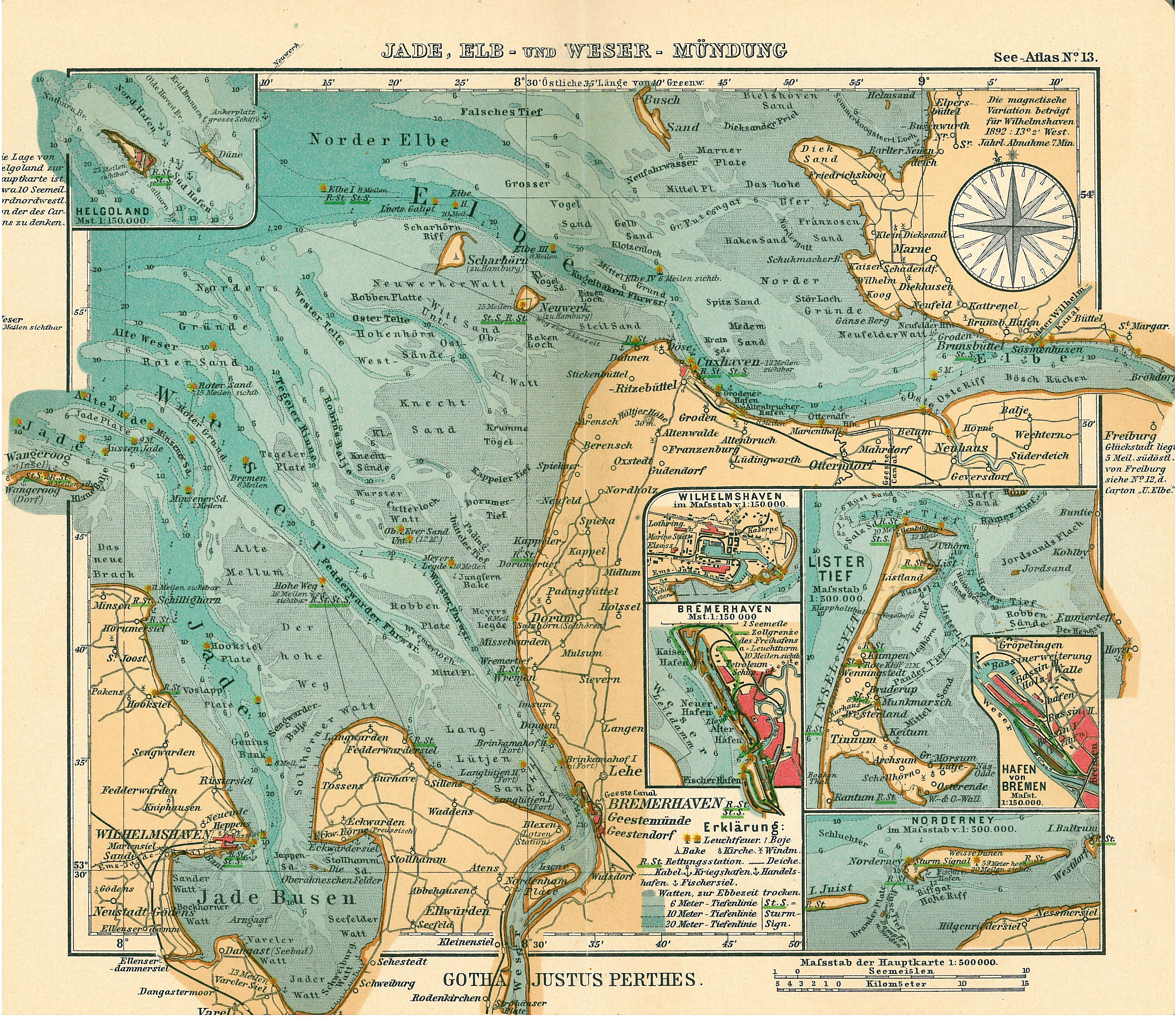
On a 1906 map only the Minsener Sand lighthouse is shown

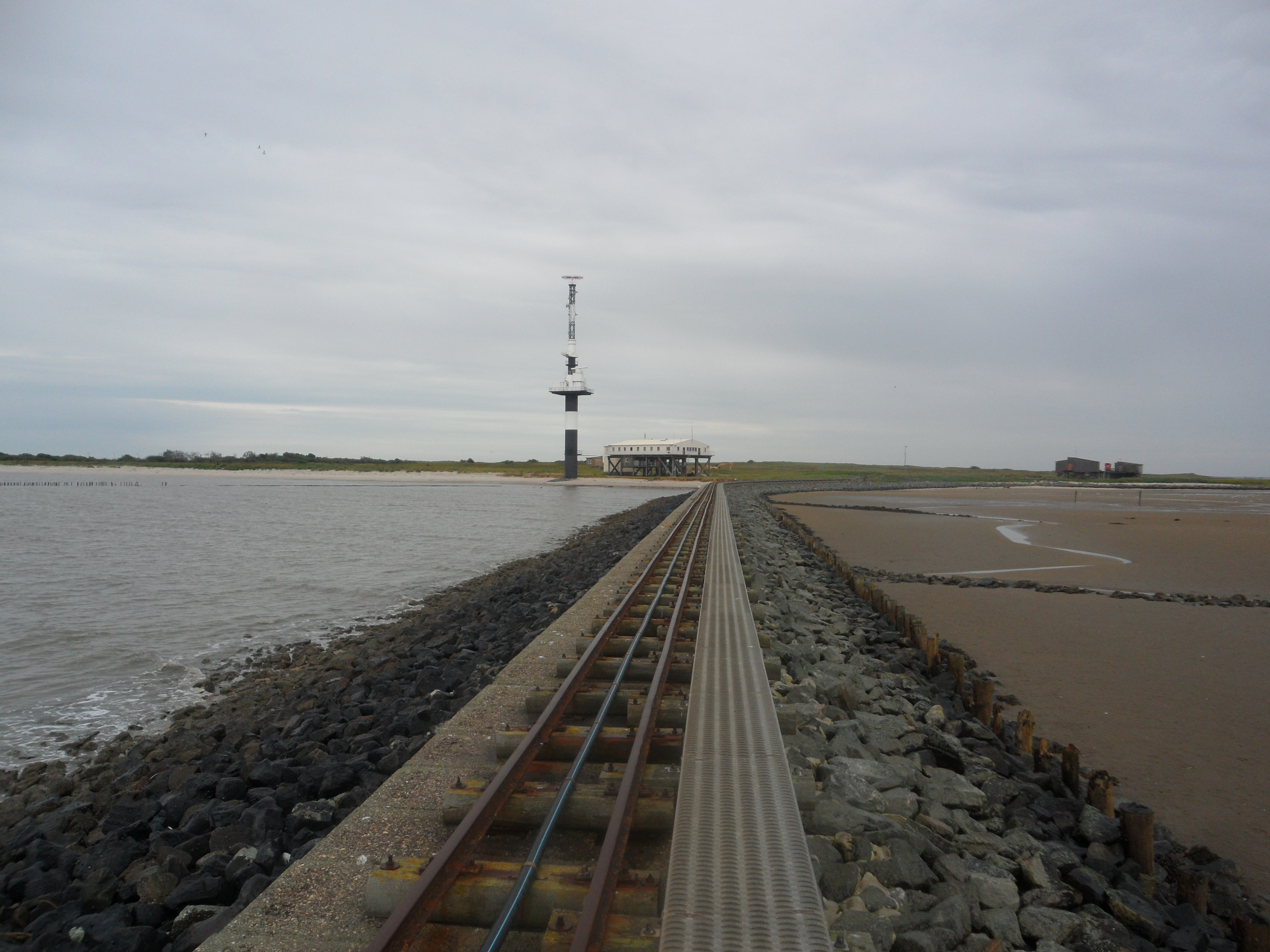
Radar tower, narrow-gauge railway on Groyne C and WSA building yard
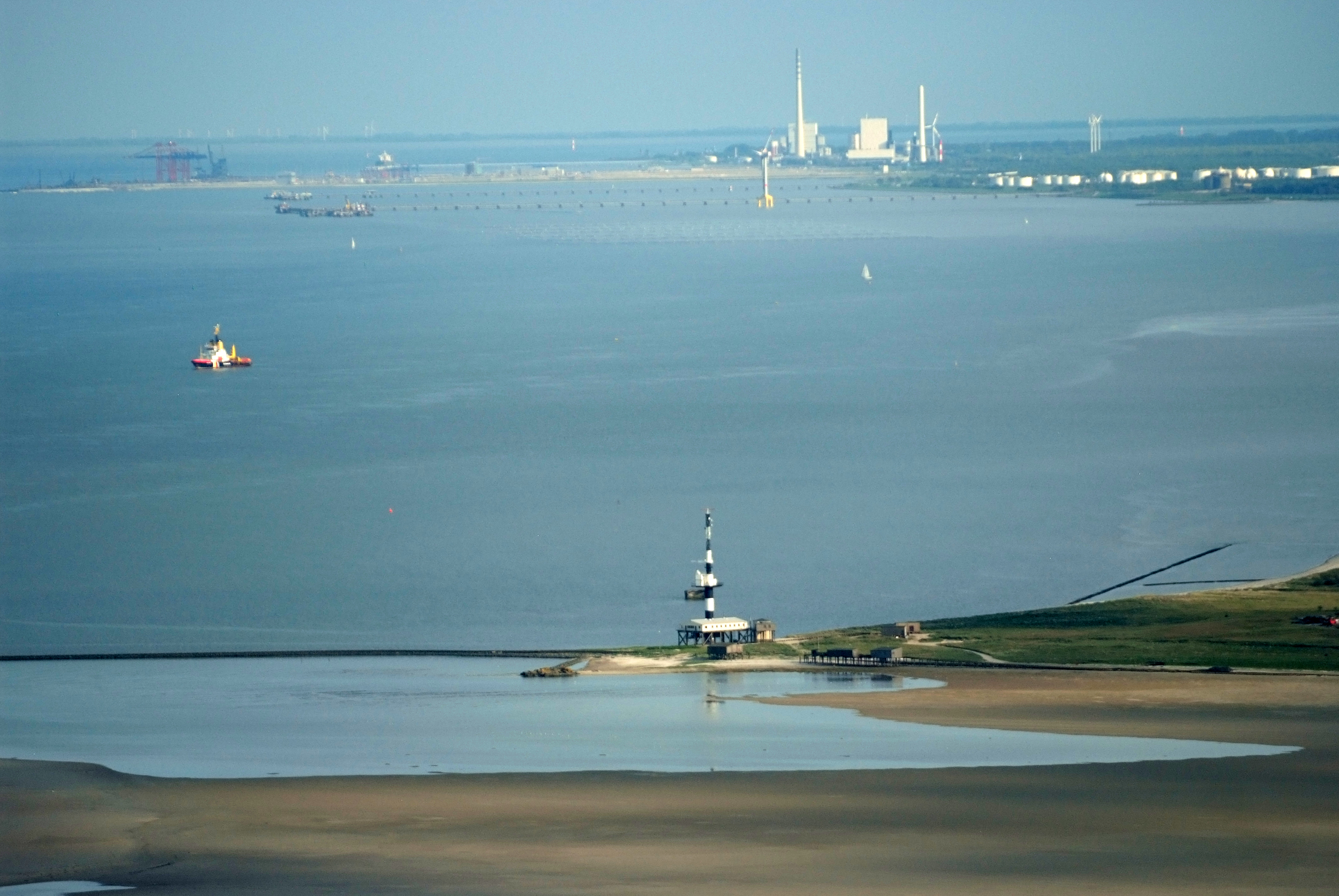
Aerial view of the radar tower; in the background: mainland with JadeWeserPort, Wilhelmshaven Power Station (E.ON) and oil tanks of Nord-West Oelleitung (May 2012)

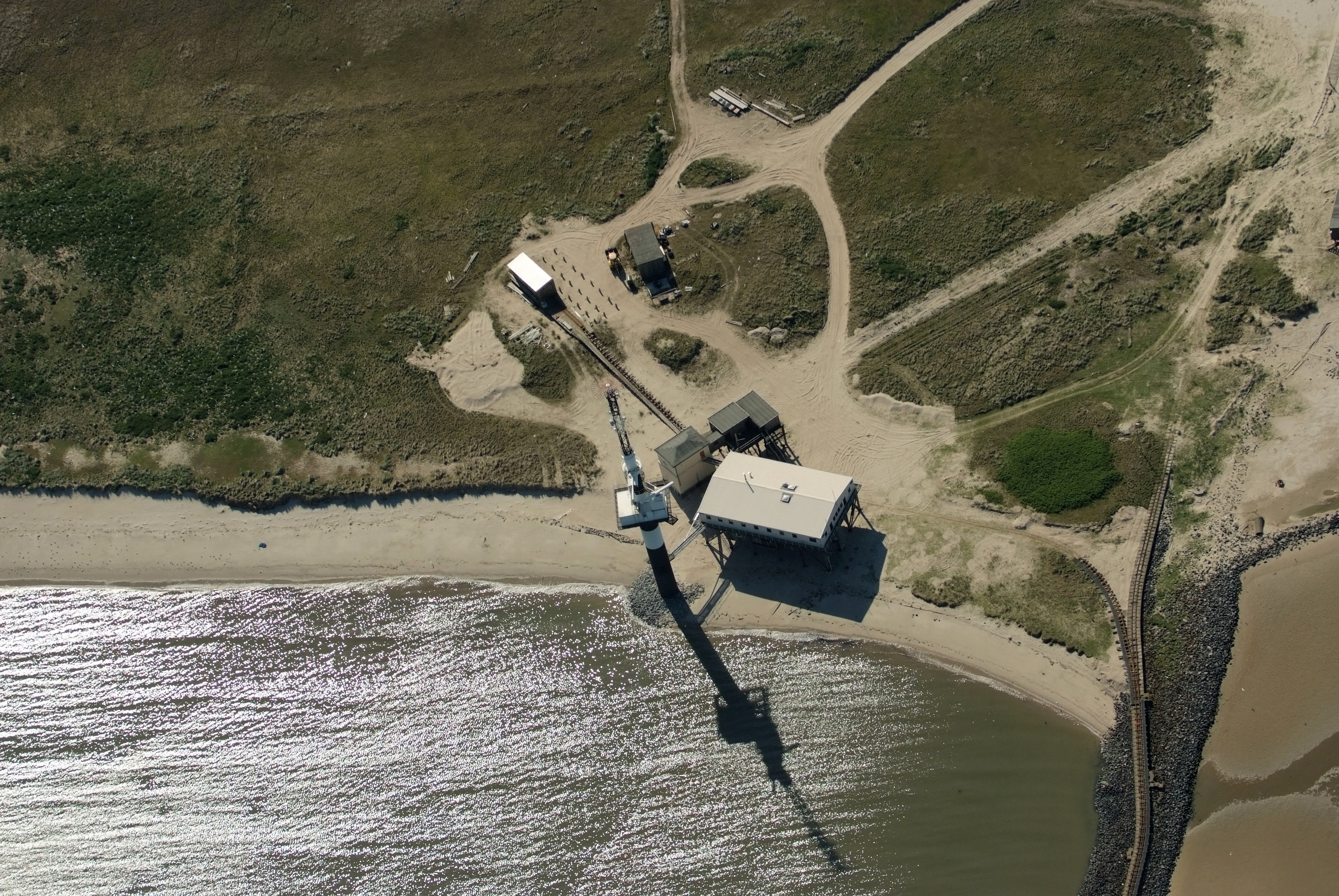
Radar tower and WSA building yard

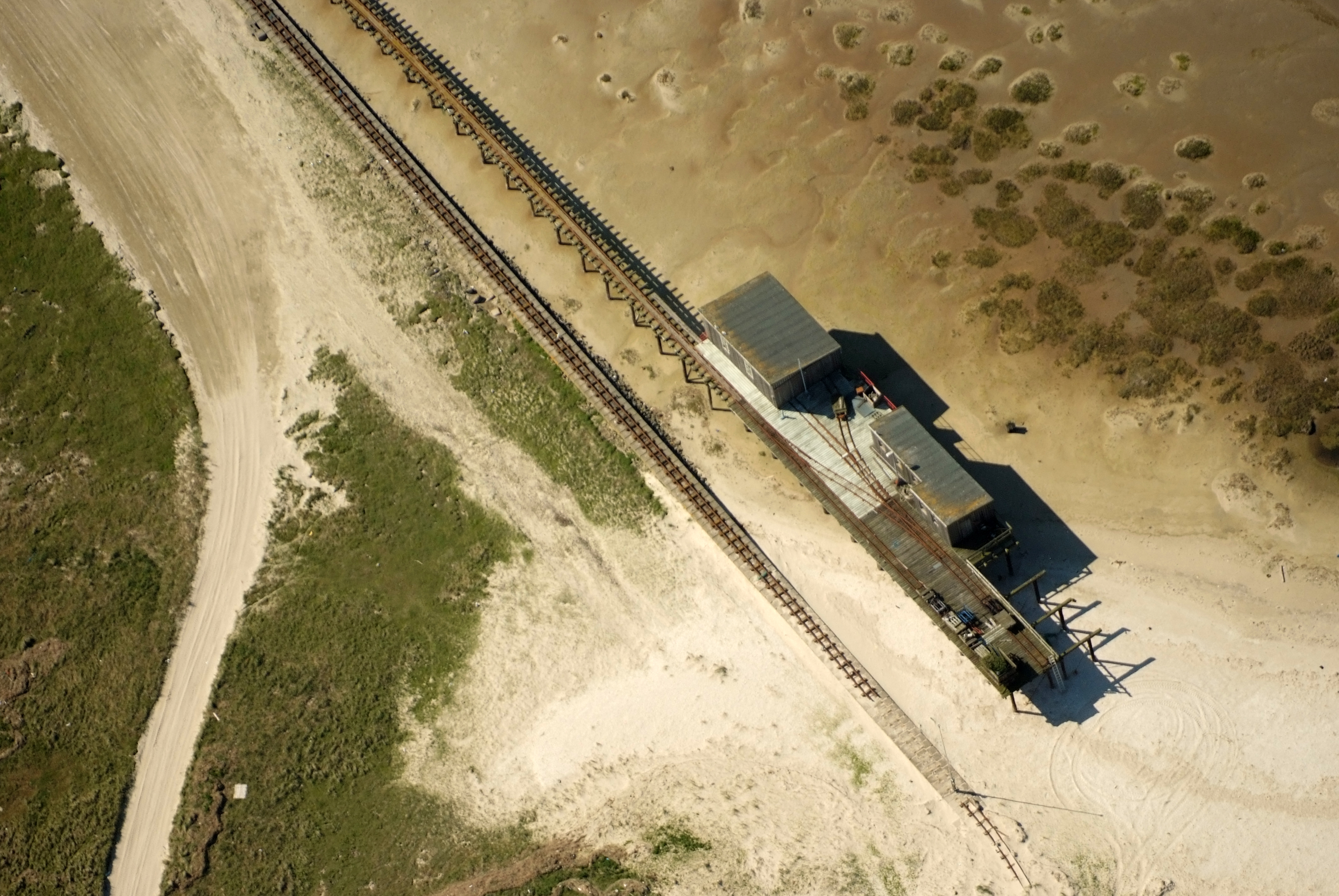
Aerial view of the narrow gauge railway

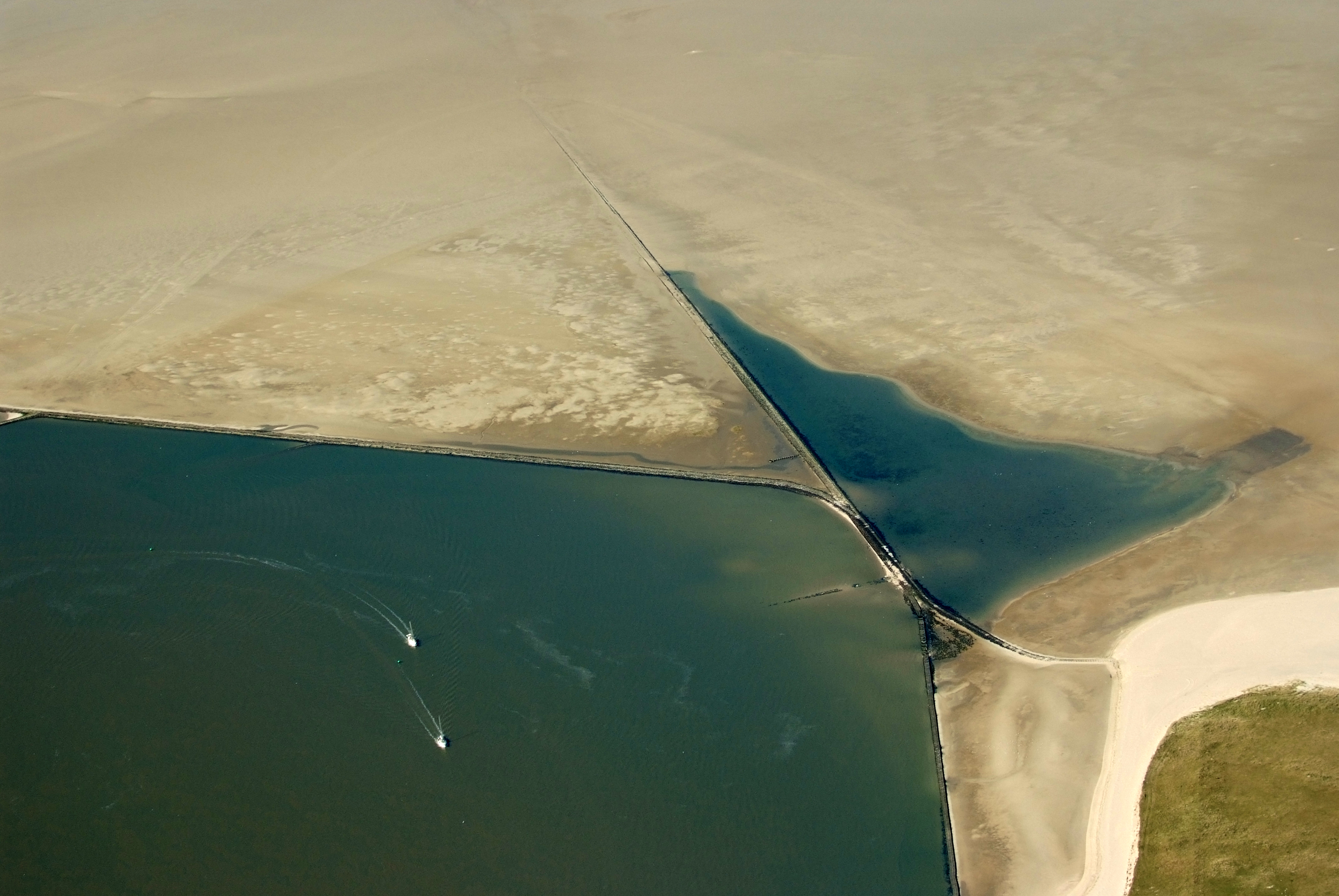
Aerial view of the island

== Fauna ==
Lighthouse keepers who used to live on the island introduced rabbits as a living food reserve.

The island was placed under protection in 1959 as a major breeding site for seabirds. Breeding birds in 2004 were the herring gull, lesser black-backed gull, common gull, common tern, Arctic tern, Sandwich tern and little tern, as well as the magpie, carrion crow and swallow. While the numbers of terns amount to more than 2,000 pairs, only a few pairs of the little tern were noted. Shelduck and stock dove have bred in the rabbit holes.

== Tourism ==
In the summer months mudflat hikes are conducted from Schillig on the mainland to the island. But, for conservation reasons, only a small part of the island may be entered The whole island is a nature reserve and belongs to the "quiet zone" of the Lower Saxon Wadden Sea National Park.

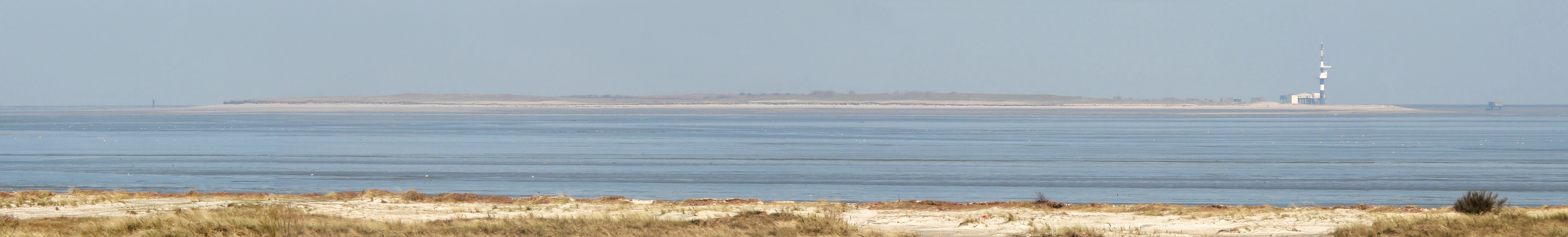
Minsener Oog seen from Schillig. Right: the Minsener Oog Groyne C radar tower and accommodation huts

== Sources ==
- Coldewey, Tim (2004). Anthropogener Eingriff in die maritime Morphodynamik einer unbewohnten Nordseeinsel. Wilhelmshaven
- Friedrich, Ernst Andreas (1982). Gestaltete Naturdenkmale Niedersachsens, Landbuch-Verlag, Hanover, ISBN 3-7842-0256-X
