= Dr. Henry Wheeler House =

Historic house in North Dakota, United States

- U.S. National Register of Historic Places
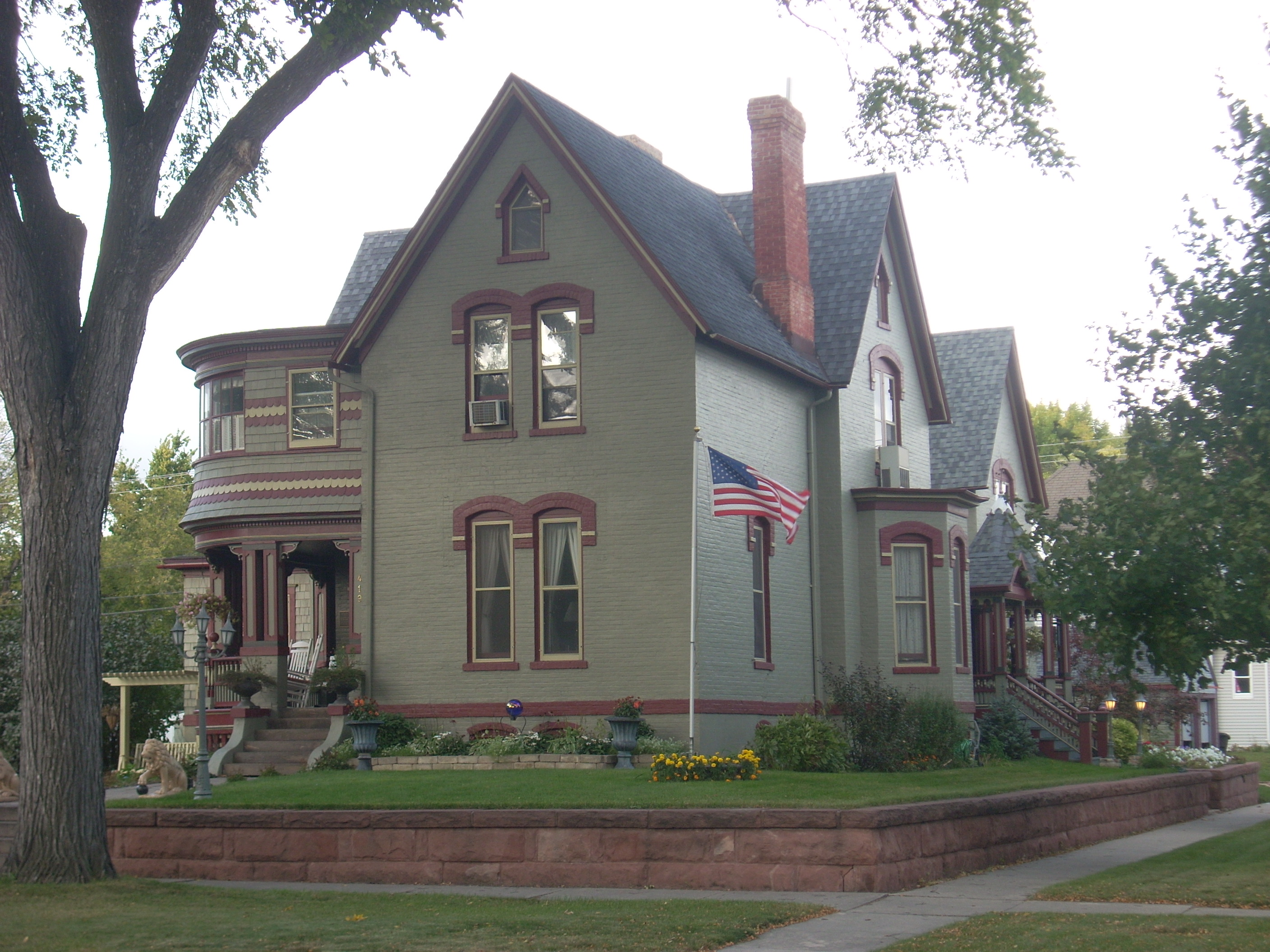

- Location within North Dakota Location within the United States
- Location: 420 Franklin St., Grand Forks, North Dakota
- Coordinates: 47.92026°N 97.02598°W
- Area: less than 1 acre (0.40 ha)
- Built: 1884-1885
- Architect: Wheeler, George
- Architectural style: Italianate
- NRHP reference No.: 86000166
- Added to NRHP: January 16, 1986

The Dr. Henry Wheeler House is a property in Grand Forks, North Dakota, United States, that was listed on the National Register of Historic Places in 1986. It was built in 1884 or 1885. It was probably designed by George Wheeler, a New York architect, younger brother of Henry. It includes Italianate architecture. The property includes just one contributing building, the house. Also included is one non-contributing building, a more modern garage. The listing is for an area of less than 1 acre (0.40 ha). The listing is described in its NRHP nomination document.

It's a red brick building that stands out in its neighborhood near the Red River of the North.
