= Henry Wheeler (cricketer) =

English cricketer

Personal information
- Full name: Henry James William Wheeler
- Born: 27 March 1840; Gibraltar
- Died: 29 October 1908 (aged 68); Westminster, London, England

Domestic team information
- Years: Team
- 1864: Middlesex

Career statistics
Competition	FC
Matches	1
Runs scored	44
Batting average	22.00
100s/50s	–/–
Top score	27
Balls bowled	–
Wickets	–
Bowling average	–
5 wickets in innings	–
10 wickets in match	–
Best bowling	–
Catches/stumpings	1/–
- Source: Cricinfo, 27 November 2010

Henry James William Wheeler (27 March 1840 – 29 October 1908) was an English cricketer. Wheeler's batting and bowling styles are unknown. He was born on Gibraltar.

Wheeler made his one and only first-class appearance for Middlesex in 1864 against Sussex at the Royal Brunswick Ground in Brighton. In this match he scored 44 runs in two innings, with a high score of 27 and a batting average of 22.00, while in the field he took a single catch.
