= Mellum =

Island in Germany

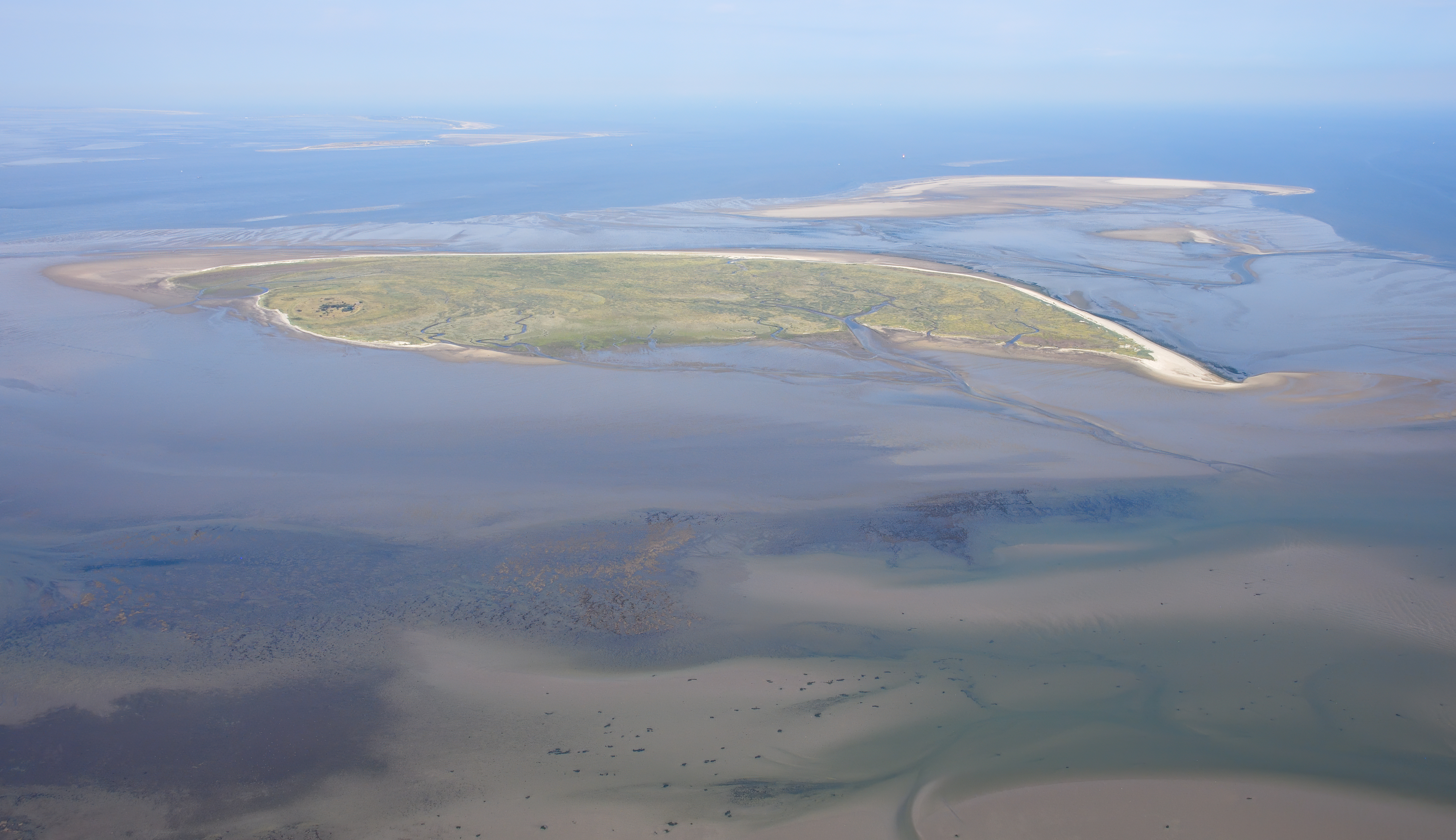
- Aerial view of Mellum
- Interactive map of Mellum

Geography
- Location: North Sea
- Coordinates: 53°43′16″N 8°8′58″E
- Area: 3 km^{2} (1.2 sq mi)
- Length: 3 km (1.9 mi)
- Width: 1.8 km (1.12 mi)
- Highest elevation: 3 m (10 ft)

Administration
- Germany

Demographics
- Population: 0

Mellum (German pronunciation: [ˈmɛlʊm]) is an uninhabited island lying southeast of Wangerooge, off the coastal settlements of Horumersiel and Schillig in Germany.

Mellum formed as an island off the end of the Butjadingen peninsula—which divides the outflows into the Wadden Sea of the Jade and Weser rivers—only at the end of the nineteenth century. It is chiefly composed of dunes and tidal marshes. The influence of sea currents and winds is constantly altering the shape and position of the island, which in 2006 had a total surface area of approximately 750 hectares (1853 acres).

An important breeding and feeding ground for wild birds, Mellum is part of the Lower Saxony Wadden Sea National Park and a nature protection zone. The island's only house is today used during the summer months for wildlife observation and scientific research purposes only.
