= Henry Lord Wheeler =

American organic chemist (1867–1914)

- Born: September 14, 1867; Chicago, Illinois, U.S.
- Died: October 30, 1914 (aged 47); Manhattan, New York City, U.S.
- Education: Yale University
- Scientific career
- Fields: Organic chemistry
- Workplaces: Yale University

Henry Lord Wheeler (September 14, 1867 – October 30, 1914) was an American organic chemist at Yale University whose research focused on the chemistry of pyrimidine compounds and related heterocyclic molecules. Working largely at the Sheffield Scientific School of Yale, he contributed to early studies of compounds such as cytosine, thymine, and uracil, and collaborated extensively with the chemist Treat Baldwin Johnson.

== Education and career ==
Wheeler studied chemistry at the Sheffield Scientific School of Yale University, graduating in 1890. He received his Ph.D. at Yale in 1893 under Horace L. Wells.

After a period of study in Germany and a brief appointment at the University of Chicago, Wheeler returned to Yale, where he joined the faculty of the Sheffield Scientific School. He was appointed associate professor in 1899 and later became professor of organic chemistry.

== Research ==
Wheeler investigated many aspects of the chemistry of pyrimidine derivatives, particularly cytosine, thymine, and uracil. His work also examined reactions of aniline derivatives, thioureas, amidines, and hydantoin compounds, including their reactions with halogens and alkyl halides, as well as halogen derivatives of amino acids such as alanine, phenylalanine, and tyrosine.

Much of this research was carried out with his student Treat Baldwin Johnson, and a number of their studies were later compiled in the volume Papers on Pyrimidines published by the Sheffield Scientific School of Yale University.

== Honors ==
Wheeler was elected a Fellow of the American Association for the Advancement of Science in 1901 and a member of the National Academy of Sciences in 1909.

== Later life ==
In 1911 Wheeler retired from his professorship at Yale following a divorce proceeding that received contemporary press attention.

He died on October 30, 1914, in Manhattan, New York City. He was buried in Graceland Cemetery in Chicago.
