= Memmert =

East Frisian island off the northern coast of Germany

Coordinates: 53°38′N 6°54′E

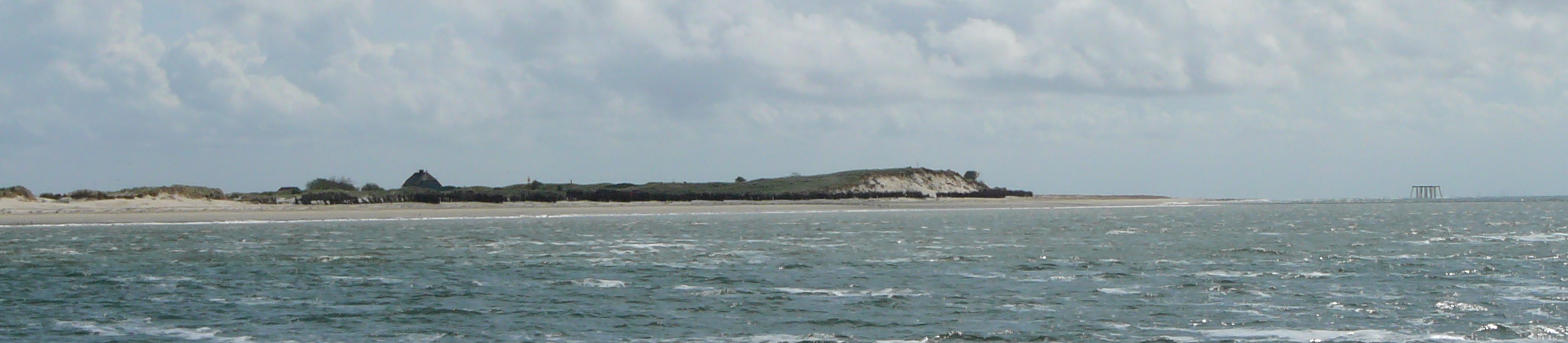
A view of Memmert from the North

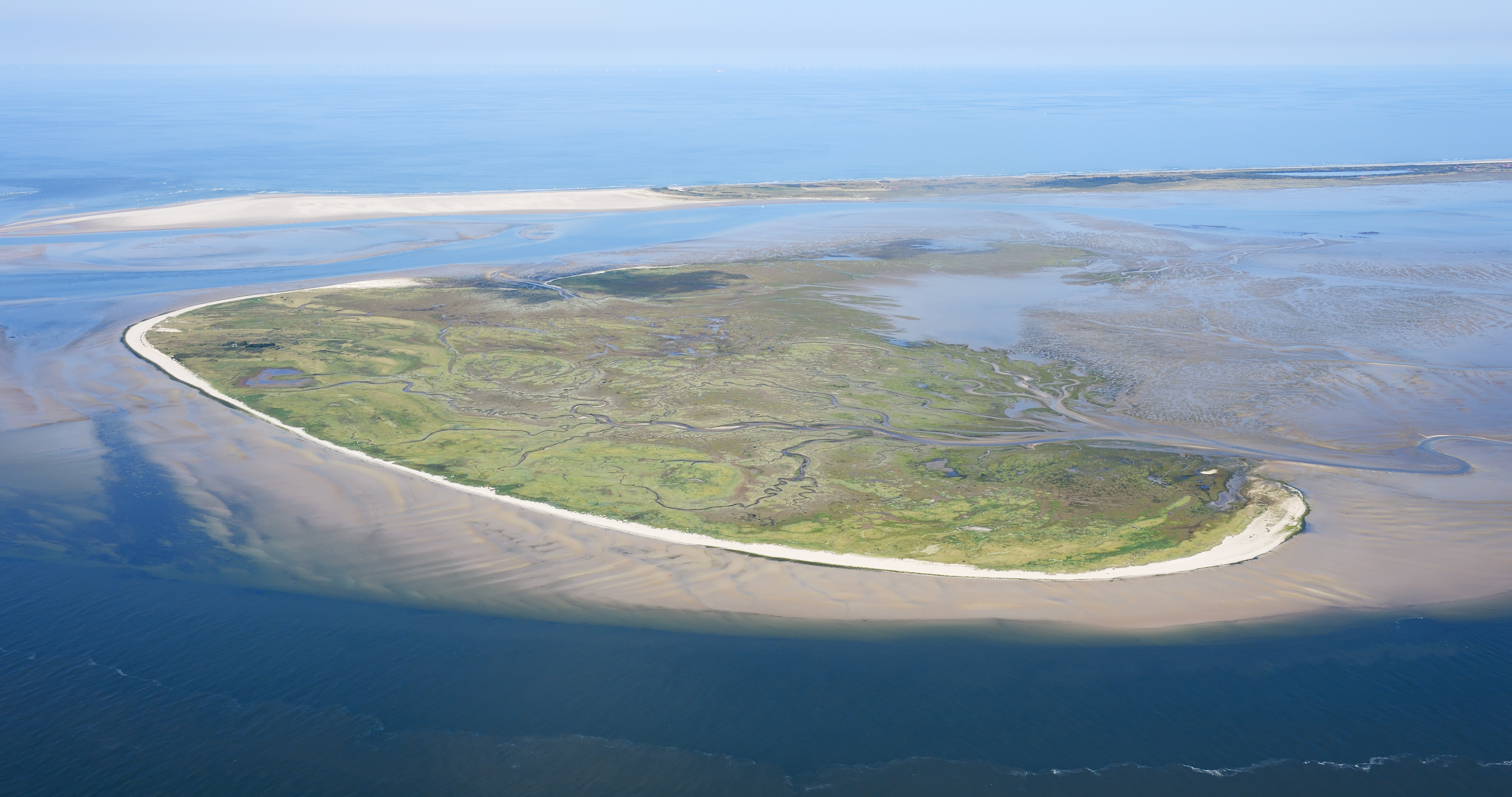
Aerial view of Memmert from the south

Memmert (German pronunciation: [ˈmɛmɐt]) is a small East Frisian island off the northern coast of Germany, with an area of 5.2 square kilometres (2.0 sq mi). Memmert is uninhabited, with only one house on the island for wildlife-spotting purposes. Occasionally, some guests from the neighboring islands visit Memmert for recreation. Memmert is officially a wildlife protected area.

The island plays an important role in Erskine Childers's novel, The Riddle of the Sands (1903).

== Notable people ==
- Otto Leege
