= Balje =

Balje may refer to:

== People ==
- Duda Balje (born 1977), Kosovan politician
- Hamza Balje (born 1970), Kosovan politician

== Places ==
- Balje, Lower Saxony, Germany
- Blaue Balje, Germany
- Otzumer Balje, Germany
