= Baltiysk =

Town in Kaliningrad Oblast, Russia

Baltiysk Балтийск
- Town
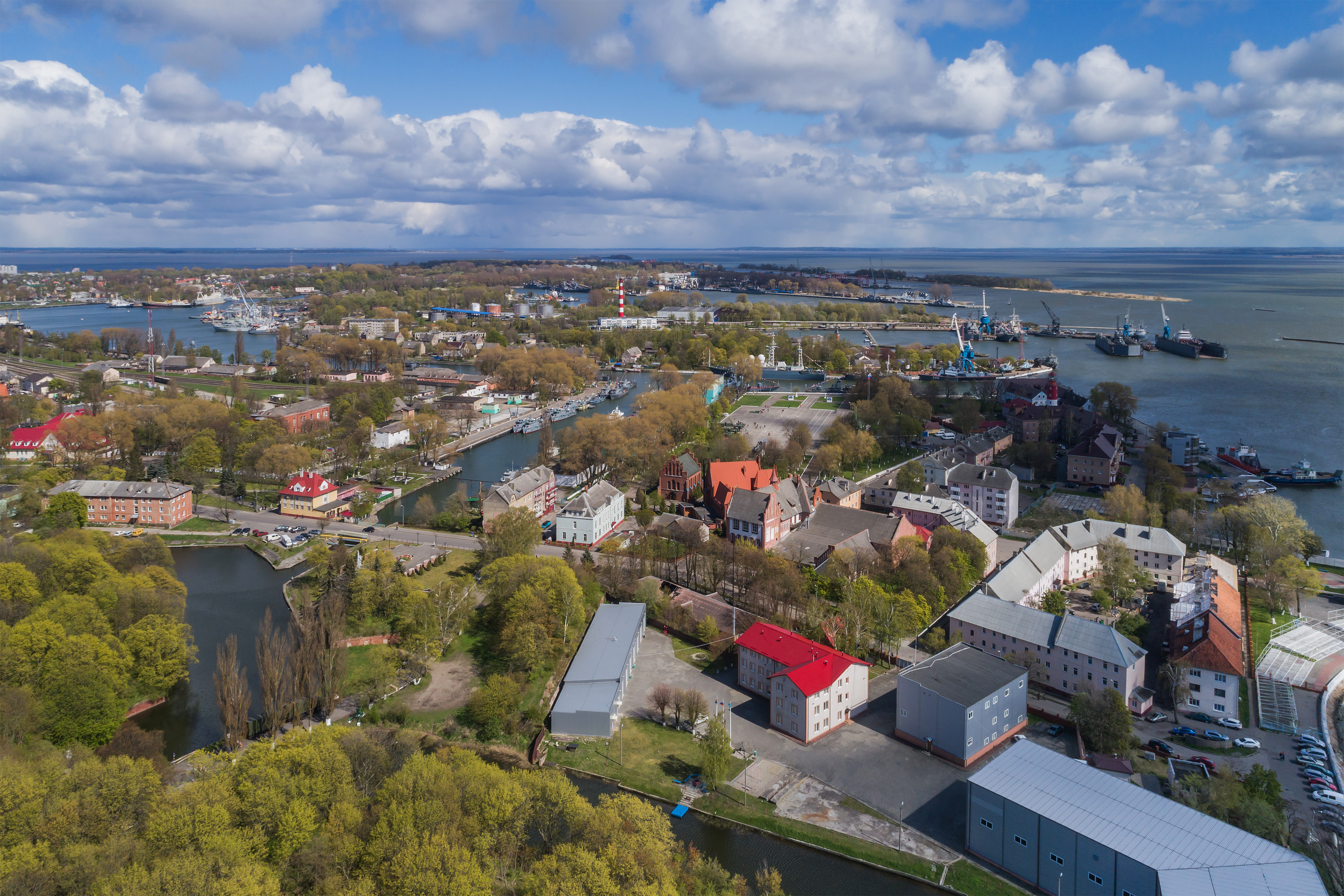
- Aerial view of Baltiysk

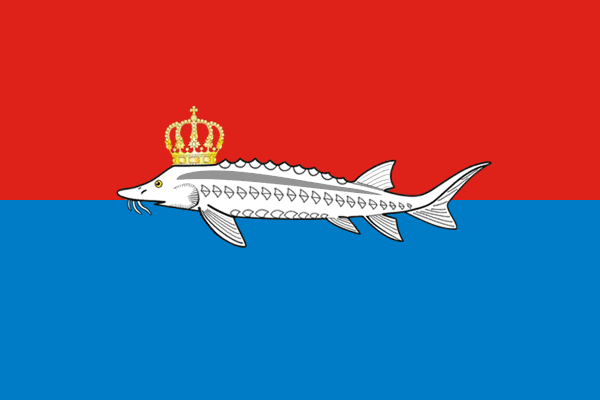
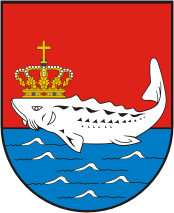
- Flag Coat of arms
- Interactive map of Baltiysk
- Location of Baltiysk Baltiysk (European Russia) Baltiysk (Europe) Baltiysk (Baltic Sea)
- Coordinates: 54°39′N 19°55′E
- Country: Russia
- Federal subject: Kaliningrad Oblast
- Administrative district: Baltiysky District
- Town of district significanceSelsoviet: Baltiysk
- Founded: 13th century
- Town status since: 1725

Government
  - Head: Maksim Brychuk
- Elevation: 10 m (33 ft)

Population (2010 Census)
  - Total: 32,697
  - Estimate (2025): 27,318 (−16.5%)

Administrative status
  - Capital of: Baltiysky District, town of district significance of Baltiysk

Municipal status
  - Municipal district: Baltiysky Municipal District
  - Urban settlement: Baltiyskoye Urban Settlement
  - Capital of: Baltiysky Municipal District, Baltiyskoye Urban Settlement
- Time zone: UTC+2 (MSK–1)
- Postal codes: 238520–238522, 238525, 238527, 238528
- Dialing code: +7 40145
- OKTMO ID: 27705000001
- Website: балтийск39.рф

Baltiysk (/bɔːlˈtiːsk/ bawl-TEESK), (Note: Russian: Балтийск, romanized: Baltijsk, IPA: [bɐɫˈtʲijsk]) prior to 1946 known by its German name Pillau, is a seaport town and the administrative center of Baltiysky District in Kaliningrad Oblast, Russia, located on the northern part of the Vistula Spit, on the shore of the Strait of Baltiysk separating the Vistula Lagoon from Gdańsk Bay. It had a population of 33,946 (2021 census); 32,697 (2010 census); 33,252 (2002 census); 27,070 (1989 Soviet census).

Baltiysk, the westernmost town in Russia, is a major base of the Russian Navy's Baltic Fleet and is connected to St. Petersburg by ferry.

== History ==
=== Old Prussian village ===
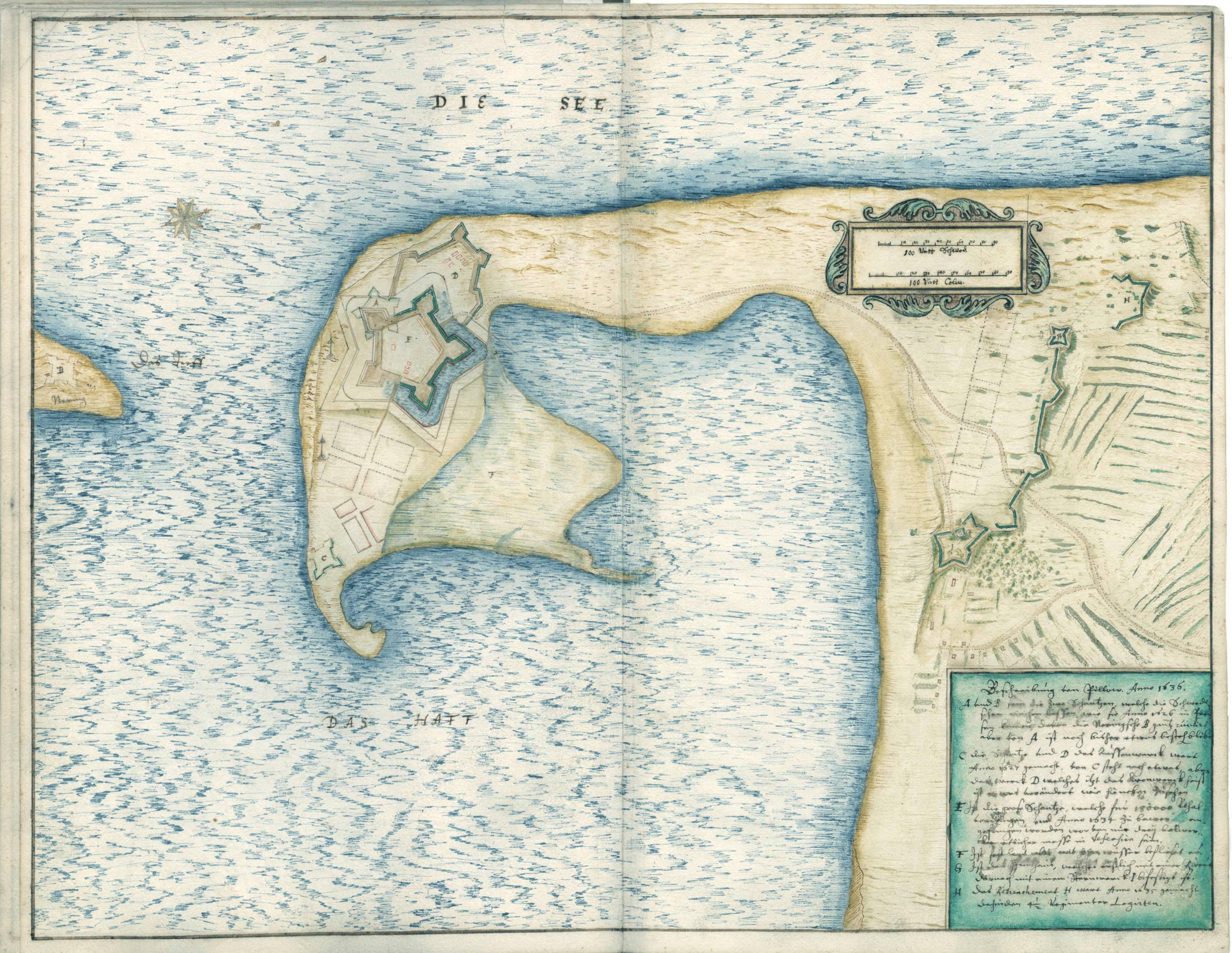
Map of Pillau in 1636.

Baltiysk was originally the site of an Old Prussian fishing village that was established on the coast of the Vistula Spit at some point in the 13th century. The village was named as "Pile" or "Pil" in several documents, possibly taking its name from pils the Old Prussian language word for fort. It was eventually conquered by the Teutonic Knights, with the name evolving into the German form of Pillau. In 1497, a storm surge dug a new gat in front of the village, and another large storm created the navigable Strait of Baltiysk through the gat on September 10, 1510. This fostered the growth of Pillau into an important port of the Duchy of Prussia, a vassal duchy of Poland, and a blockhouse was constructed in 1537, followed by a system of storehouses in 1543, and the earliest fortifications in 1550. During the Thirty Years' War, the harbor was occupied by Sweden in the aftermath of their victory over the Polish–Lithuanian Commonwealth, and King Gustavus Adolphus landed there with his reinforcements in May 1626. After the Truce of Altmark in 1629, the Swedes retained Pillau and set out upgrading its fortifications, constructing a star fort which remains one of the town's landmarks. In 1635, the citizens of Pillau paid the ransom of 10,000 thalers, whereupon Swedish forces handed over the settlement to the Elector of Brandenburg. In 1638, King Władysław IV Vasa introduced Polish maritime customs duties in the local port. In 1652, a mission house was established by Jesuits from Braniewo, Poland.

=== Prussian town ===
Map of town and fortress (around 1686)

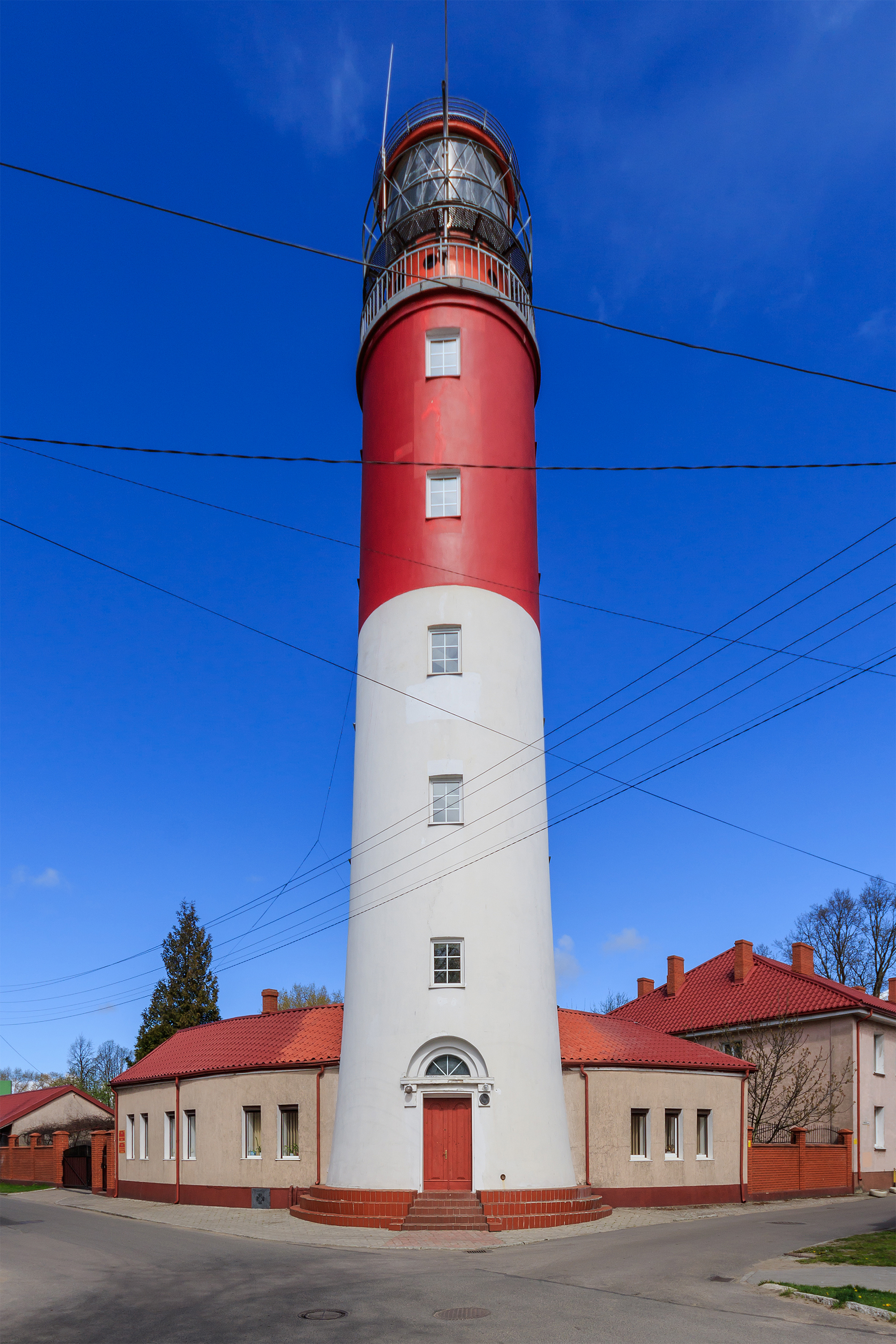
A lighthouse

By the end of the 17th century, Pillau had expanded considerably, and a lighthouse and a stone church were built. Peter the Great, the Tsar of Russia, visited Pillau on three occasions, the first being in 1697 in connection with his Grand Embassy to Western Europe. A statue of Peter the Great currently stands next to the lighthouse. After Pillau was granted town privileges in 1725, the Baroque-style town hall was constructed and inaugurated in May 1745 but was destroyed at the end of World War II. Russian forces occupied the town during the Seven Years' War and built a small Orthodox church there, with the event commemorated by the equestrian statue of Empress Elizabeth, unveiled in 2004. In the late 18th century, the present-day southern part of the town, the part located on the Vistula Spit, was annexed by Prussia in the Partitions of Poland. In June 1807, Pillau was stormed by Napoleon's Grande Armée during the Napoleonic Wars, although no outstanding events took place during the rest of the 19th century. Records of a Scottish "colony" established in Pillau in 1815 appeared in an 1890 publication, although their authenticity is questionable. The lighthouse was built up to a height of 31.38 meters (103.0 ft) and the entire fortress was updated and rebuilt by the Prussians in 1871. In 1886, the town had a population of 3,434, apart from the fortress garrison.

The importance of Pillau declined from 15 November 1901, when a shipping canal was opened linking the Vistula Lagoon near Zimmerbude (now Svetly) to Königsberg. Pillau's economy was heavily based on large shipping vessels being forced to dock in the town due to the shallow depth of the lagoon near Königsberg, the capital and the largest city of East Prussia, and the goods would then be transported from Pillau to Königsberg by other means. Constructed at a huge cost of thirteen million marks, the canal allowed vessels of a 21 feet (6.4 m) draught to moor alongside the city or to sail directly to Königsberg without stopping at Pillau, causing a serious decline to the town's economy.

=== World War II ===
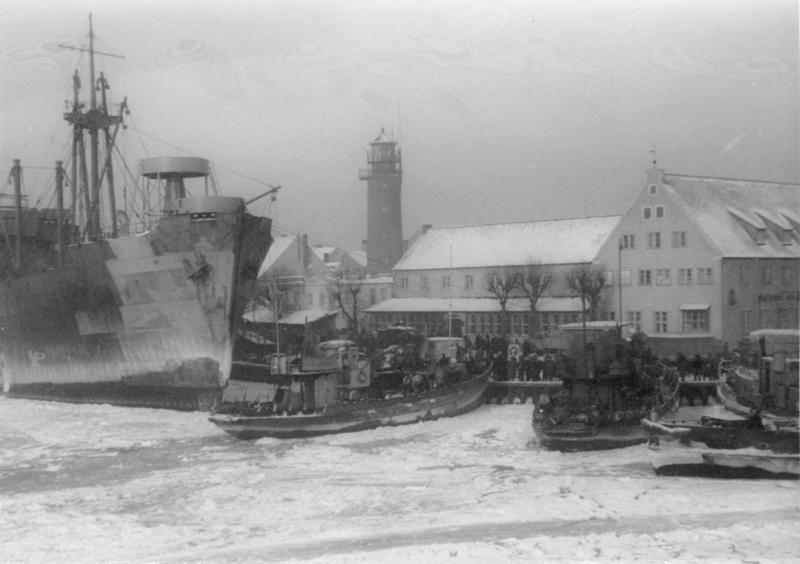
Evacuation of German civilians from Pillau, 26 January 1945, fleeing from the Red Army

During World War II, a Sammellager prisoner-of-war camp was located in the town in October and November 1939, following the German invasion of Poland. The Polish resistance conducted espionage in the town.

Pillau had a U-boat training facility, and on 16 April 1945, the German submarine U-78 was sunk by Red Army artillery fire while she was docked near the electricity supply pier in Pillau port, and was the only U-boat to be ever sunk by land-based forces in World War II. As the Red Army entered East Prussia, more than 450,000 refugees were ferried from Pillau to central and western Germany. The town was eventually captured by Soviet forces on 25 April 1945, only a few days before the end of the war and as the last part of East Prussia to be abandoned by Germany.

=== Modern Baltiysk ===
After the war, Pillau was included in the northern part of East Prussia passed to the Soviet Union that became Kaliningrad Oblast, and the German inhabitants were expelled in accordance with the Potsdam Agreement. During the Russification campaign, the town's name was changed to Baltiysk in 1946.

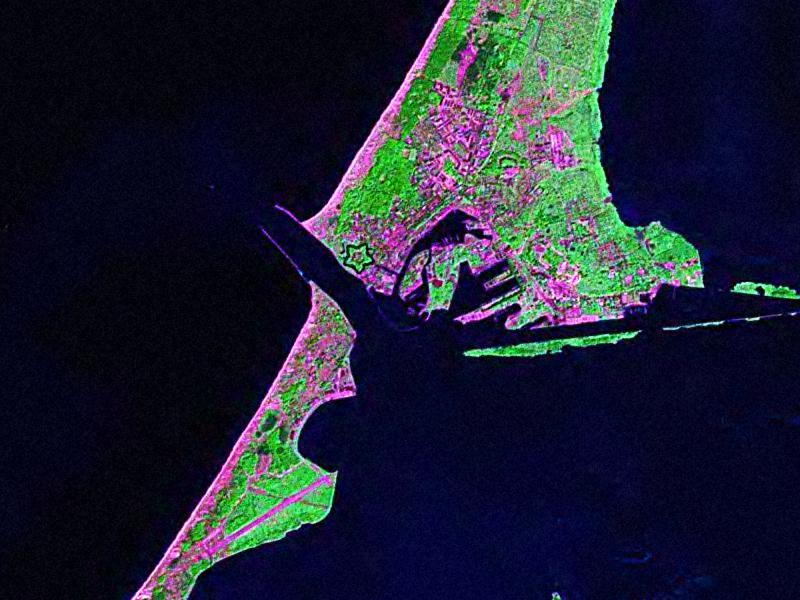
Landsat satellite photo taken circa 2000

In 1952, the Soviet authorities inaugurated a naval base for the Baltic Fleet of the Soviet Navy at Baltiysk, and as a result, it became a closed town with access forbidden to foreigners or those without a permit. During the Cold War it was served by the Baltiysk Air Base. The town, along with Kaliningrad, remains one of only two year-round ice-free ports along the Baltic Sea coastline available to Russia.

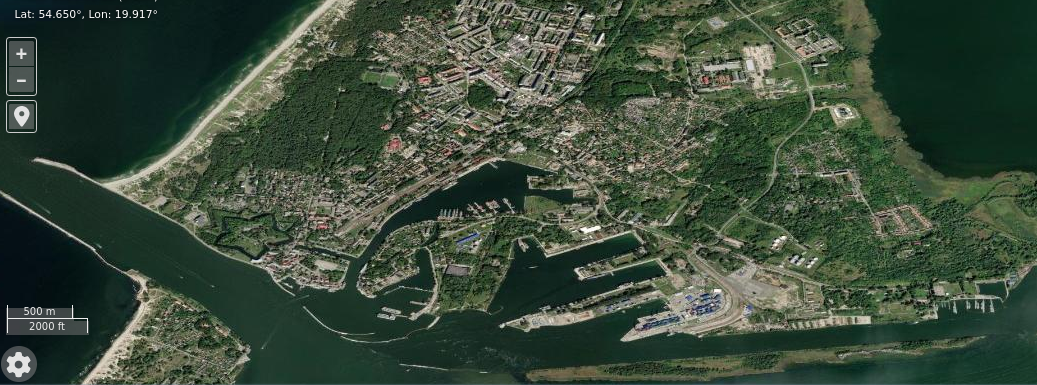
Satellite imagery of Baltiysk port

In 2019, on a wave of anti-Western sentiment following Russia's annexation of Crimea, there were calls to change the town's German-era coat of arms, which features a sturgeon wearing the crown of King Frederick William I of Prussia. The historic arms had been granted to the town, then known as Pillau, in 1725.

== Administrative and municipal status ==
Within the framework of administrative divisions, Baltiysk serves as the administrative center of Baltiysky District. As an administrative division, it is, together with two rural localities, incorporated within Baltiysky District as the town of district significance of Baltiysk. As a municipal division, the town of district significance of Baltiysk is incorporated within Baltiysky Municipal District as Baltiyskoye Urban Settlement.

== Geography ==
The town is located on the northern part of the Vistula Spit, on the shore of the Strait of Baltiysk separating the Vistula Lagoon from Gdańsk Bay.

=== Climate ===
Baltiysk has a temperate oceanic climate (Köppen Cfb borders on Dfb). Winters are cold to mild, while summers are warm. In July and August, the warmest season, high temperatures average 21 °C (70 °F) and low temperatures average 15 °C (59 °F). In January and February, the coldest season, high temperatures average 3 °C (37 °F) with low temperatures averaging −2 °C (28 °F).

Climate data for Baltiysk
Month	Jan	Feb	Mar	Apr	May	Jun	Jul	Aug	Sep	Oct	Nov	Dec	Year
Record high °C (°F)	14.5 (58.1)	17.1 (62.8)	14.9 (58.8)	25.0 (77.0)	27.1 (80.8)	29.4 (84.9)	31.7 (89.1)	31.3 (88.3)	26.7 (80.1)	22.6 (72.7)	17.1 (62.8)	17.0 (62.6)	31.7 (89.1)
Mean daily maximum °C (°F)	2.5 (36.5)	2.5 (36.5)	4.6 (40.3)	9.7 (49.5)	14.9 (58.8)	17.8 (64.0)	20.6 (69.1)	21.0 (69.8)	16.8 (62.2)	12.4 (54.3)	6.4 (43.5)	3.5 (38.3)	11.1 (52.0)
Daily mean °C (°F)	0.3 (32.5)	0.4 (32.7)	2.5 (36.5)	7.0 (44.6)	11.7 (53.1)	15.0 (59.0)	17.9 (64.2)	18.4 (65.1)	14.4 (57.9)	10.1 (50.2)	4.6 (40.3)	1.4 (34.5)	8.7 (47.7)
Mean daily minimum °C (°F)	−1.8 (28.8)	−1.6 (29.1)	0.3 (32.5)	4.0 (39.2)	8.2 (46.8)	11.8 (53.2)	14.8 (58.6)	15.6 (60.1)	12.1 (53.8)	8.1 (46.6)	2.9 (37.2)	−0.4 (31.3)	6.2 (43.2)
Record low °C (°F)	−20.8 (−5.4)	−17.6 (0.3)	−12.9 (8.8)	−4.0 (24.8)	−0.2 (31.6)	1.4 (34.5)	7.8 (46.0)	8.1 (46.6)	4.3 (39.7)	−1.4 (29.5)	−8.8 (16.2)	−14.8 (5.4)	−20.8 (−5.4)
Average precipitation mm (inches)	65 (2.6)	54 (2.1)	50 (2.0)	41 (1.6)	53 (2.1)	71 (2.8)	78 (3.1)	69 (2.7)	73 (2.9)	62 (2.4)	66 (2.6)	73 (2.9)	752 (29.6)
Source: Kaliningrad-meteo.ru

== Landmarks ==
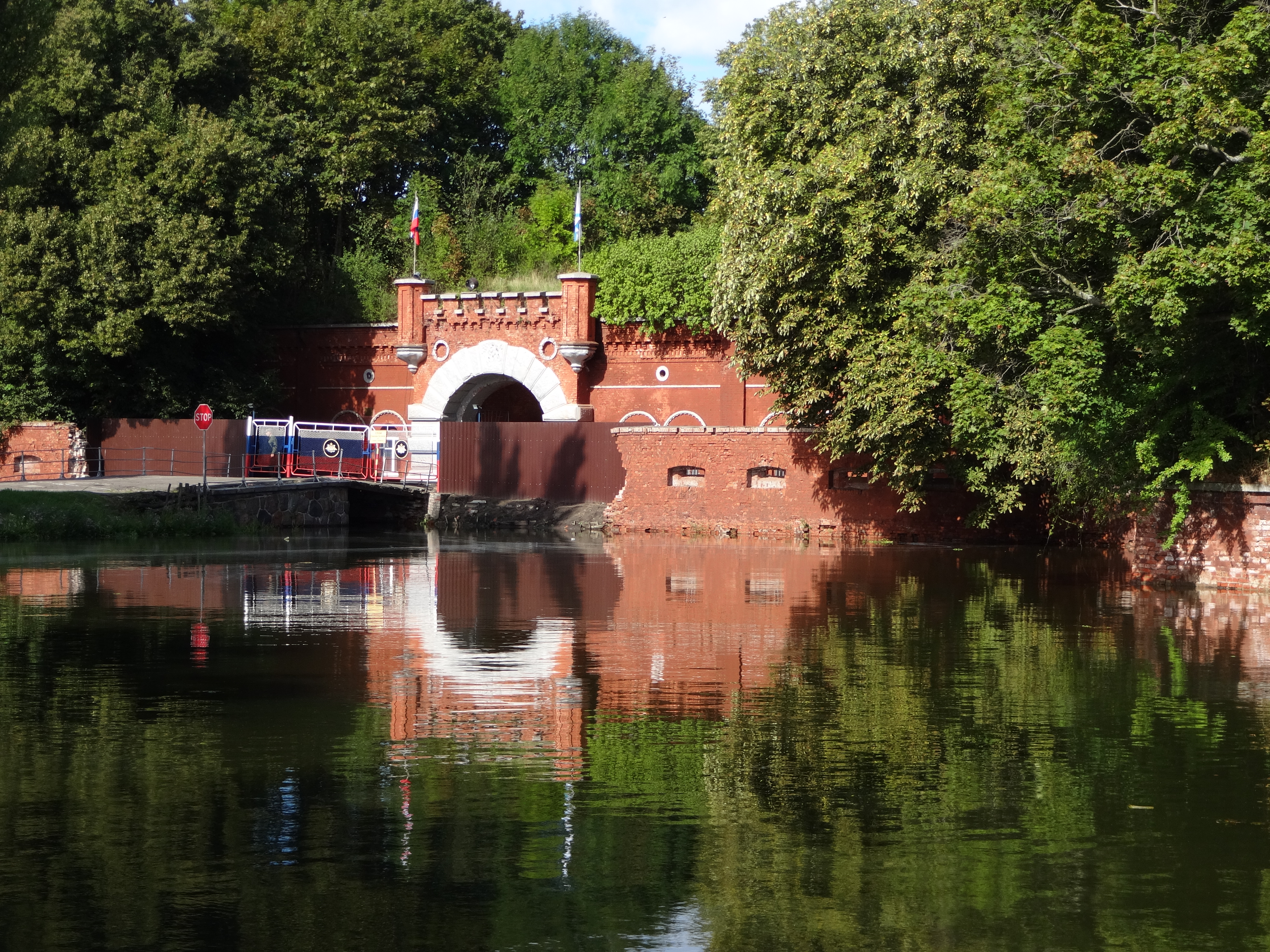
Fortress

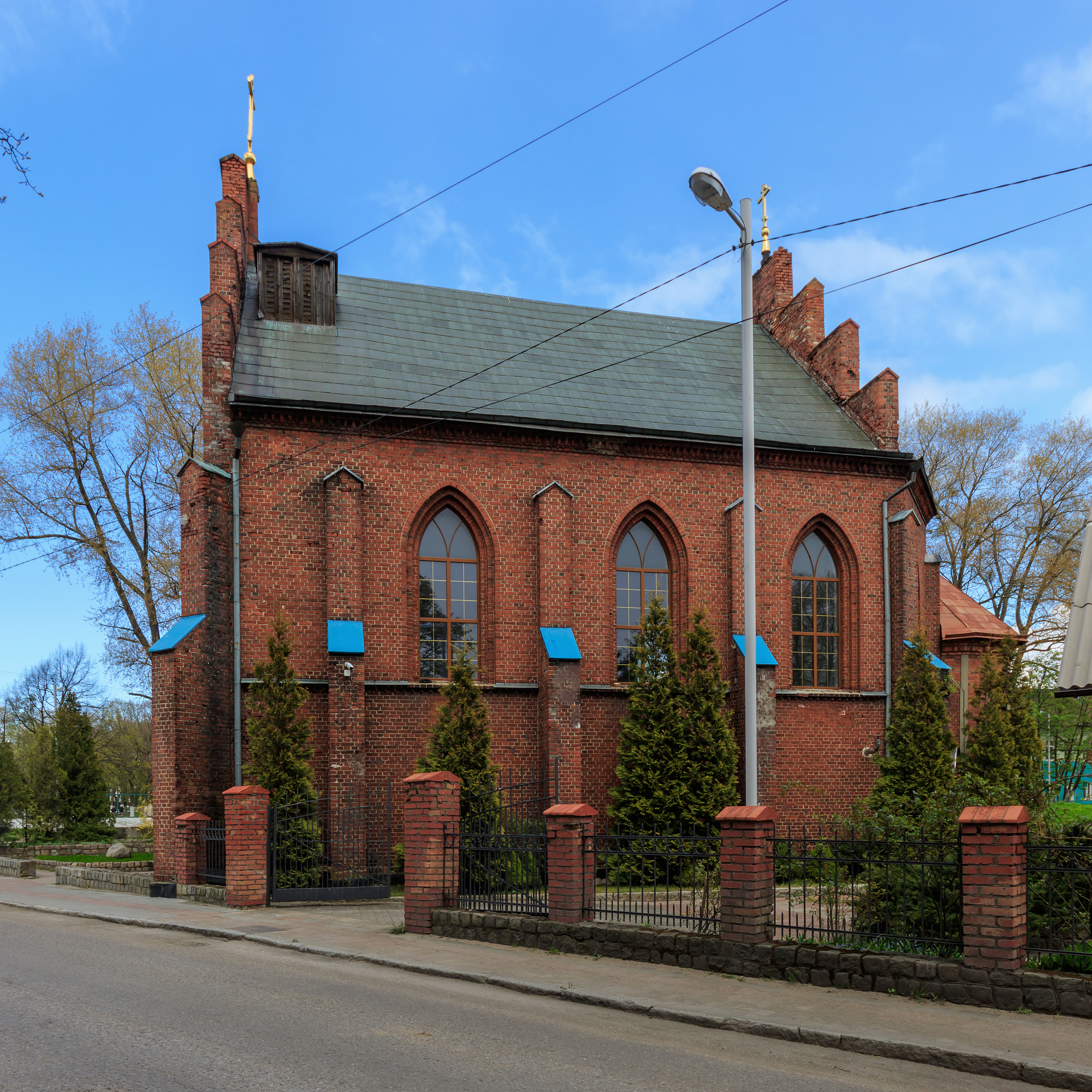
Saint George church

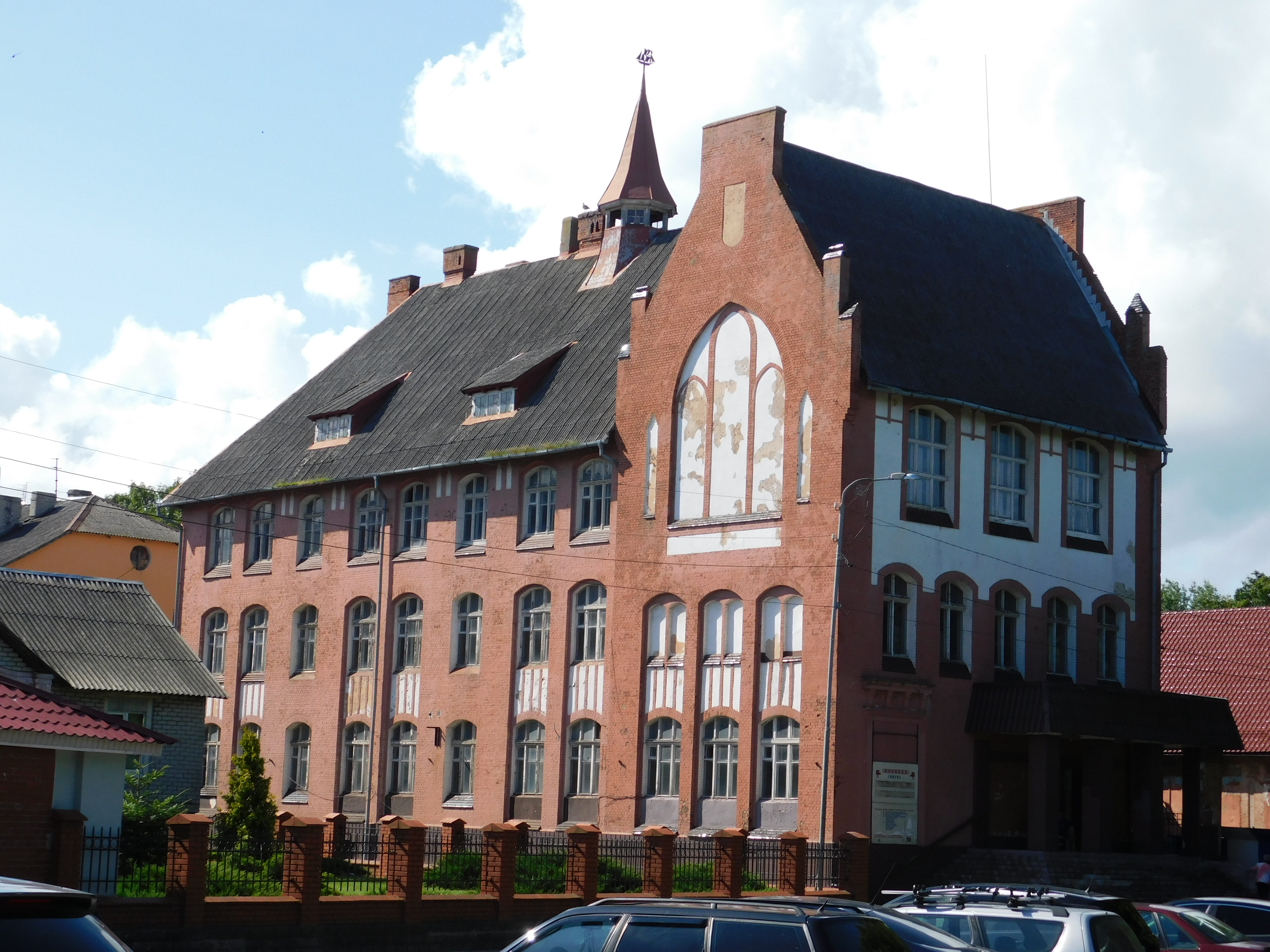
Sailor's club

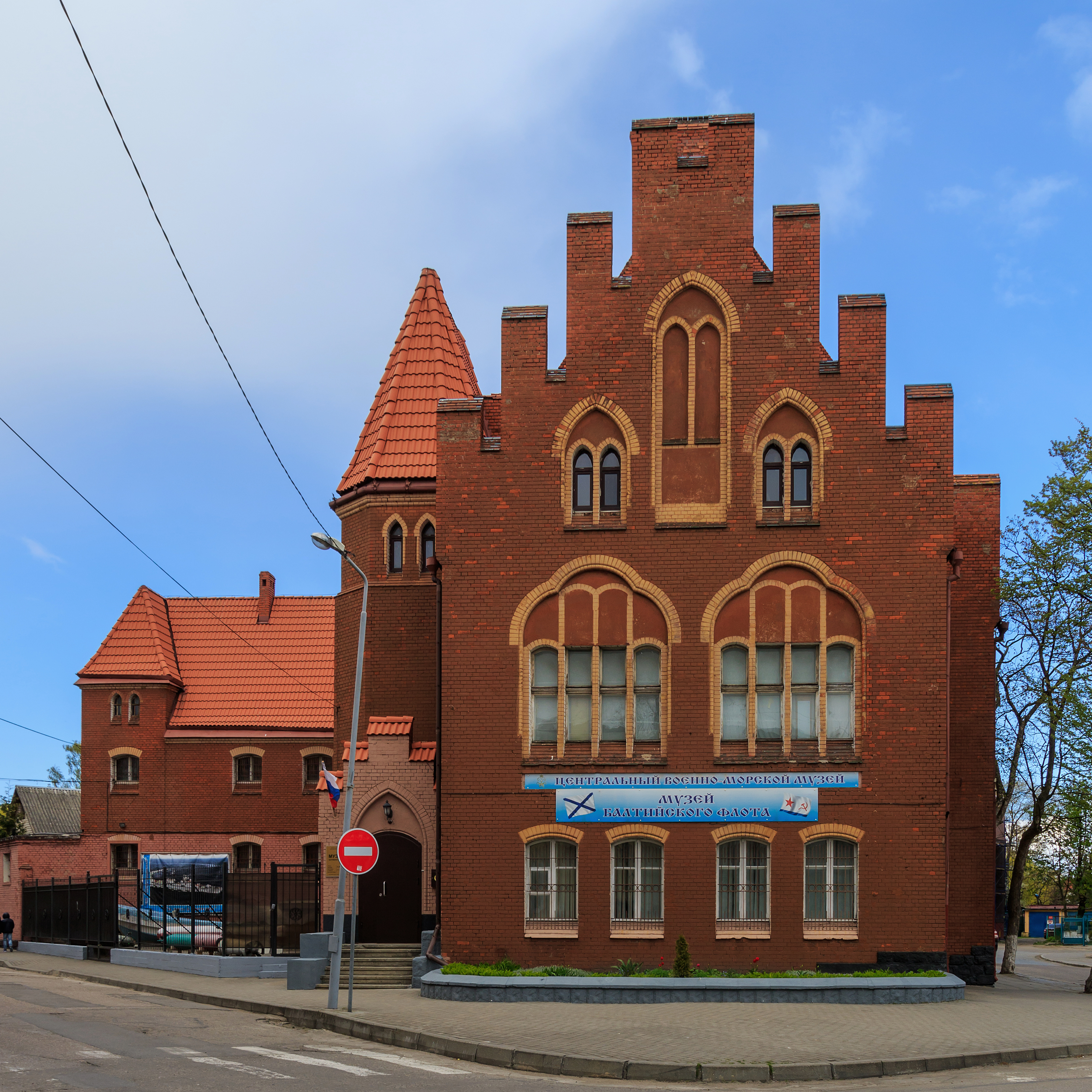
Baltic Fleet Museum

Historical buildings in and around the town include the pentagonal Pillau Citadel, founded by the Swedes in 1626, completed by the Prussians in 1670, renovated in 1870, and currently holding a naval museum; the ruins of the 13th-century Lochstadt Castle; a maze of 19th-century naval fortifications; the Naval Cathedral of St. George (1866); the 32-meter (105 ft) Expressionist observation tower (1932); the Gothic Revival building of the Baltic Fleet Museum (1903); and an elegant lighthouse, dating from 1813 to 1816. A stone cross, erected in 1830 to commemorate the supposed spot of St. Adalbert of Prague's martyrdom, was destroyed by the Soviets and restored a millennium after the event, in 1997. There is a seaside monument of Empress Elizabeth of Russia, erected postwar by the Russian sculptor Georgy Frangulyan.

== Notable people ==
- Karl Heinrich Barth (1847–1922), German pianist
- Otto Dempwolff (1871–1938), German linguist and anthropologist
- Fritz Gajewski (1885–1965) a German businessman with IG Farben
- Renate Garisch-Culmberger (1939–2023), an East German athlete
- Manfred Schaefer (1943–2023) a German former association football defender
- Grigoriy Korchmar (1947–2025) a Russian composer and pianist.

== International relations ==
=== Twin towns and sister cities ===
Baltiysk is twinned with:

- Karlskrona, Sweden

=== Former twin towns ===
- Elbląg, Poland
- Nysa, Poland

On 28 February 2022, Elbląg ended its partnership with Baltiysk as a response to the Russian invasion of Ukraine.
