= Baltrum =

- Municipality
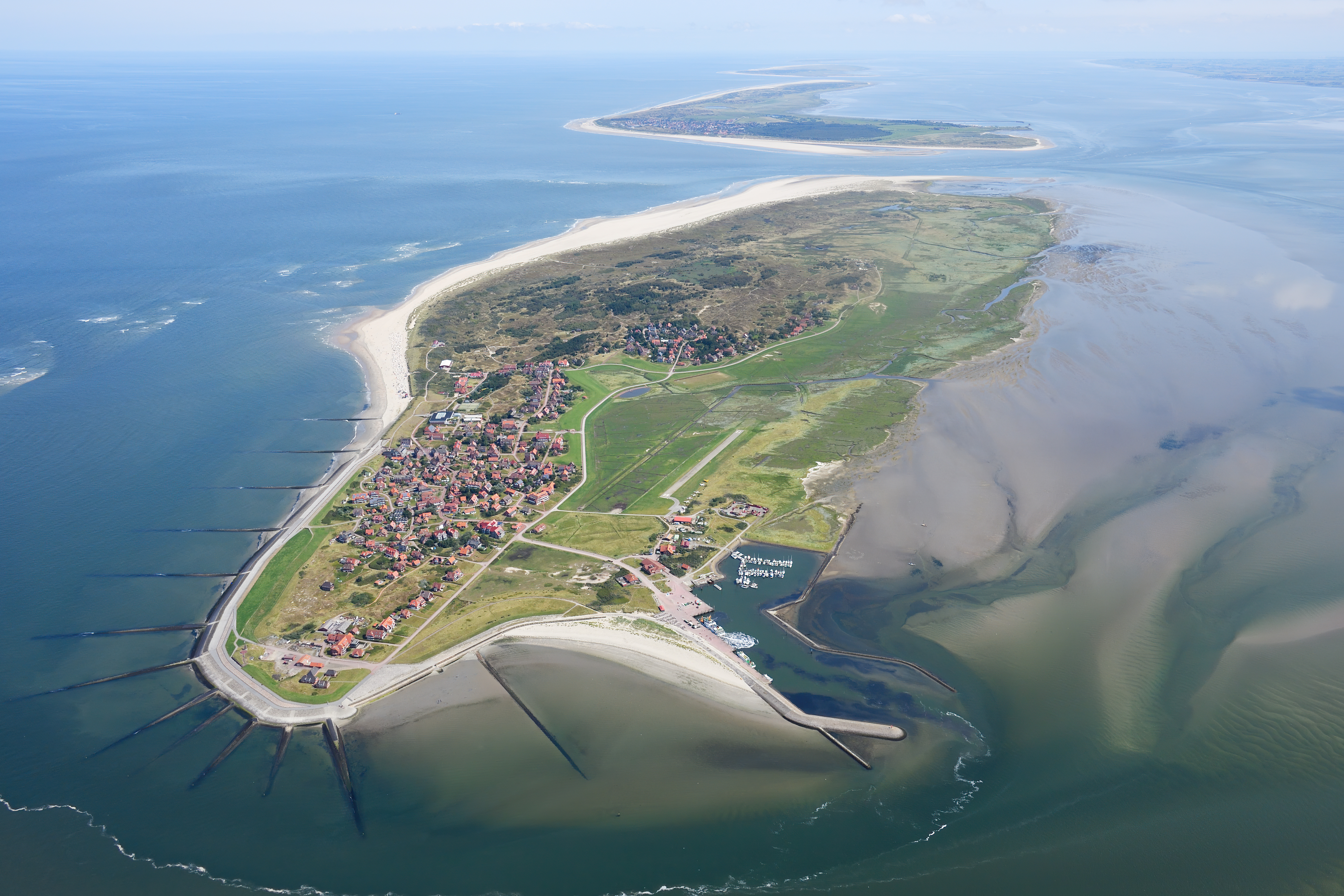
- Aerial view of Baltrum from the west

- Flag Coat of arms

- Location of Baltrum within Aurich district
- Interactive map of Baltrum
- Location within Germany Location within Lower Saxony
- Coordinates: 53°43′44″N 07°22′06″E
- Country: Germany
- State: Lower Saxony
- District: Aurich

Government
  - Mayor (2020–25): Harm Olchers (Ind.)

Area
  - Total: 6.5 km^{2} (2.5 sq mi)
- Elevation: 5 m (16 ft)

Population (2025-12-31)
  - Total: 485
  - Density: 75/km^{2} (190/sq mi)
- Time zone: UTC+01:00 (CET)
  - Summer (DST): UTC+02:00 (CEST)
- Postal codes: 26579
- Dialling codes: 04939
- Vehicle registration: AUR
- Website: www.baltrum.de

Baltrum (German pronunciation: [ˈbaltʁʊm]; Low German: Baltrum) is a barrier island off the coast of East Frisia (German: Ostfriesland), in Germany, and is a municipality in the district of Aurich, Lower Saxony. It is located in-between the chain of the seven inhabited East Frisian Islands. Baltrum is the smallest island in this chain by area and inhabitants. It has a land area of 6.5 square kilometres, and a population in (2011) of just over 500 resident inhabitants.

== Geography ==
It is located in the middle of the island chain known as the East Frisian Islands (German: Ostfriesische Inseln) and is the smallest permanently inhabited island in the chain according to the area and number of inhabitants. The gat or tidal channel of Wichter Ee in the west separates Baltrum from Norderney and the tidal creek Accumer Ee in the east separates it from Langeoog. There are two villages on the island – Ostdorf (English: Eastern village) and Westdorf (English: Western village) – although they have essentially merged into one. The ferry for Baltrum departs from the small port near the village of Neßmersiel (in the parish of Dornum) with connection to the train station of Norden. The island has its own ferry terminal and a small airstrip.

The island is about 5 kilometres (3.1 mi) long and 1.5 kilometres (0.93 mi) wide. It covers an area of 6.5 square kilometres (2.5 sq mi) and has a population of around 600 people, swelling to about 3,500 during the summer months due to tourism. Tourists (mainly from the Ruhr Area in North Rhine-Westphalia) travel to Baltrum to enjoy the countryside of the Lower Saxony Wadden Sea National Park, the beach and attractions such as the indoor swimming pool filled with sea water or a miniature golf course. The highest point on the island is a central coastal dune with a viewing platform on top called Aussichtsdüne in German and is 19.3 metres (63 ft) above sea-level.

== Etymology ==
The origin of the name Baltrum is not clearly clarified. In 1398, the island was mentioned for the first time in a document of enfeoffment as Balteringe meaning either "pasture" or "[the place of] the sons or followers of Balter" in Old Frisian. Another assumption is that the name is derived from the Norse god Baldr – son of Odin and Frigg. In the recent past an ironic version arose, one would be bald 'rum (English: soon around) when encircling the island, as the island is small it would not take a long time to walk around Baltrum. Nevertheless, the circumference amounts to about 15 kilometres (9.3 mi).

== History ==
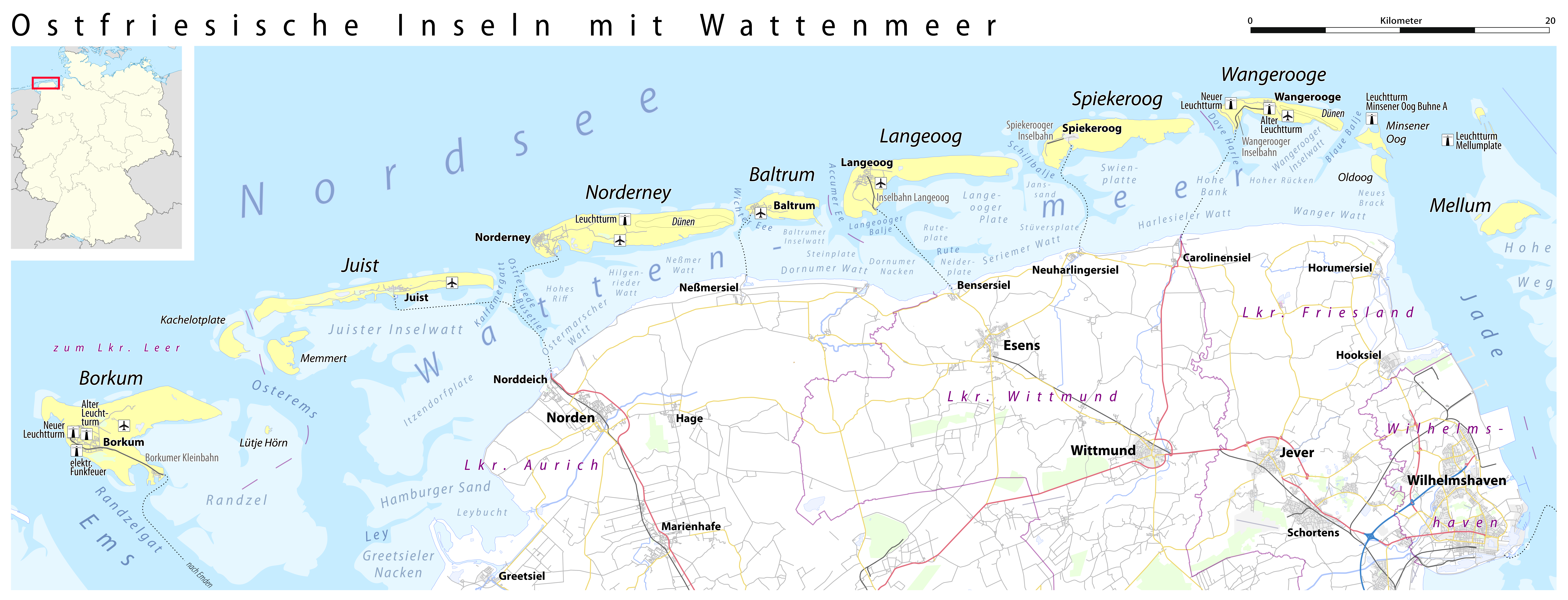
Location of Baltrum within the East Frisian Islands

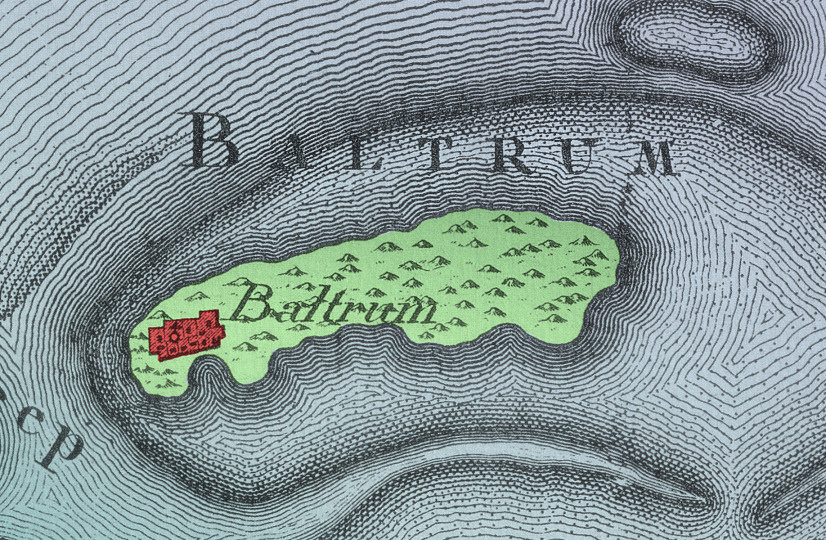
Map of Baltrum by Karl Ludwig von Lecoq 1805 with the village

The geographers Strabo and Pliny the Elder provide an indication that the island existed since the first century BC and AD. During the era of the East Frisian chieftains, from 1350 to 1464, the East Frisian islands belonged to the powerful family tom Brok. In 1398 Baltrum was mentioned in a document for the first time, when Widzel tom Brok assigned Balteringe (besides the other islands) to Duke Albert I of Bavaria and received them back as fief.

In the 17th century Baltrum had an elongated shape similar to the present shape of the barrier islands Norderney and Juist. Through the centuries Baltrum lost a huge amount of land at its west coast due to wind and sea conditions which the extension at the east coast could not compensate. Between 1650 and 1960 the island moved about 5 kilometres (3.1 mi) at its west side to east, whereas the east coast moved only 1.5 kilometres (0.93 mi) to east. A journey from a committee in 1650 reports that the 14 inhabitants on the island of that time were in jeopardy by the sea. In 1737 there was a village with a church which had to be abandoned due to silting of shifting sand dunes in 1800. The new village, named Western village, was settled down around 800 metres (2,600 ft) to the west of the present day west coast (near the present day shoal Othelloplate in-between Baltrum and Norderney) and in the east there was the Eastern village. A storm surge in 1825 disrupted the island in several pieces and it became mostly uninhabitable, followed by deserting the Western village.

From 1870 onwards the island was protected against the power of the sea with groynes, wooden palisades and revetments. Furthermore, are levees protecting the built-up area against floodings.

On the island exist no official street names but house numbers, instead. Currently (retrieved 2009), are about 300 numbers assigned to houses. The numbering is based on the date of the house construction in ascending order. So the numbers reveal some history of the buildings on the island. However the numbers do not change if a building is replaced by a newer construction.

== Tourism ==
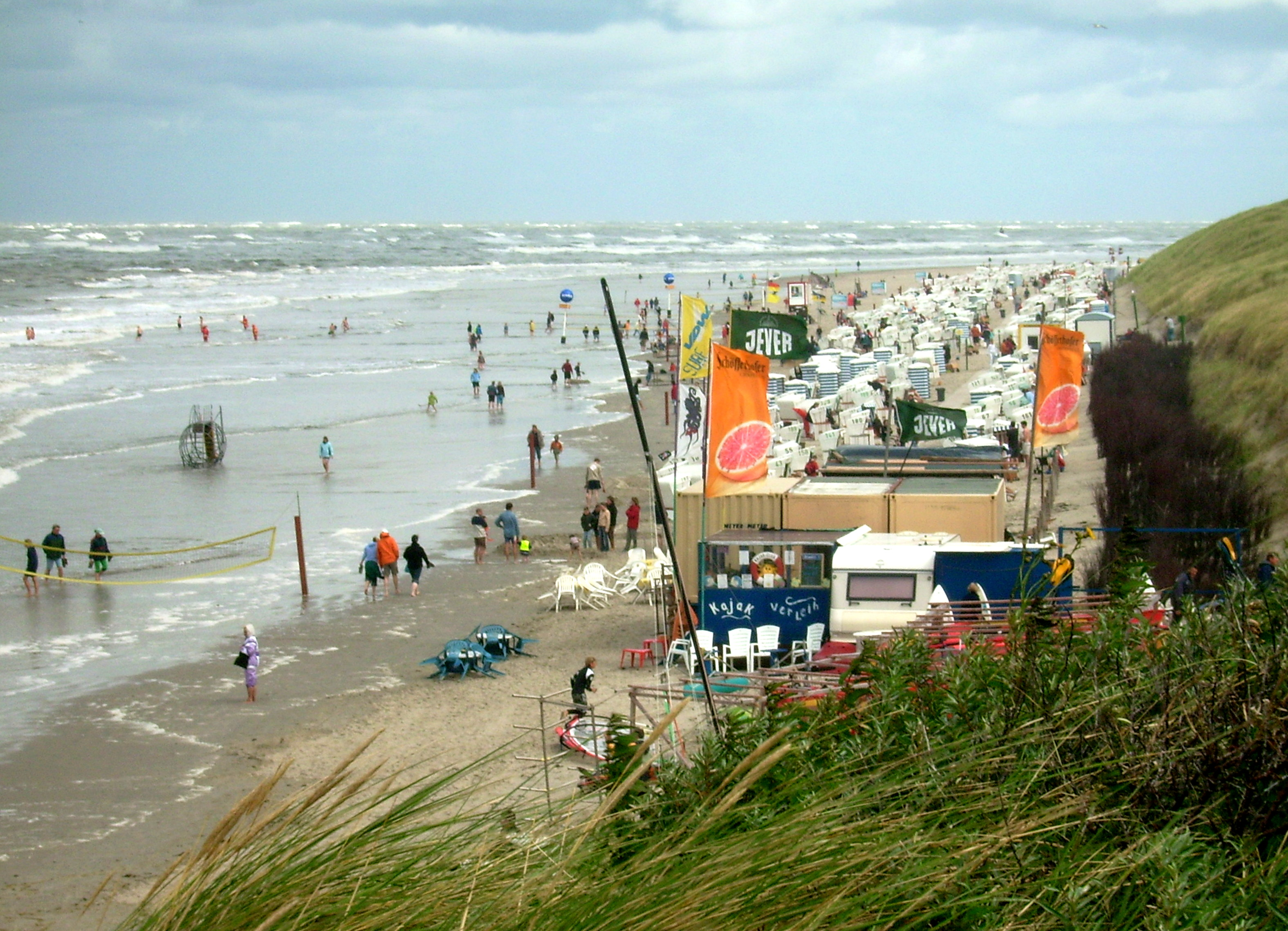
Beach of Baltrum

Although Baltrum became a seaside resort in 1876, the tourism grew very slowly. Since 1966 Baltrum has been a seaside health resort approved by the state of Germany. Two hotels were opened in the end of the 19th century, Hotel Küper in 1892 and Hotel zur Post in 1895. Before the World War II broke out 5,000 to 6,000 people visited Baltrum annually. In 1960 nearly 17,000 tourists showed up and since the 1970s there are over 30,000 people making holidays every year during the peak season. Besides the approximately 500 inhabitants about 3,000 guests are constantly living on the island during the peak seasons exhausting the acceptance capacity of the two small villages.

== Points of interest ==
- Old church of the island: In 1826 the church was built as Lutheran church, later used as Catholic church, afterwards as a morgue. In present days it is only used for marriage ceremonies, baptisms and cultural events.
- Great Lutheran church of the island: This church was built in the years of 1929–30. Both naves were attached in 1959, the tower was elevated in 1964–65.
- Saint Nicholas church: The foundation block of the Catholic church was laid on Saint Nicholas Day in 1956 and consecrated on Ascension Day in 1957. The church has a closed building used during the winter (winter church) and a thatching roofed building used in the summer season (summer church). The winter church has seats for 50 people and the summer church can receive up to 300 people. The constructor of the church was the architect Heinrich Feldwisch-Drentrup from Osnabrück, the glass windows were created by Margarete Franke.
- Historical palisade for protection: The palisade for protection (German: Historisches Pfahlschutzwerk) is located at the southwestern side. It was positioned in the 1880s and renewed in 1930–31. Nowadays it is only a section of the original palisade in-between the tiny harbor and the western end. It is heritage-protected and due to extensive restoration works in 2008 repaired at the western side.
- Museum of local history in the old custom house: The museum was opened in the old custom house by the association of local history of Baltrum on May 24, 2007. The exhibition covers the local and the natural history.
- National park museum: Founded in 1987 in the former shed of the shipping company Baltrum Linie and focuses on the tides.
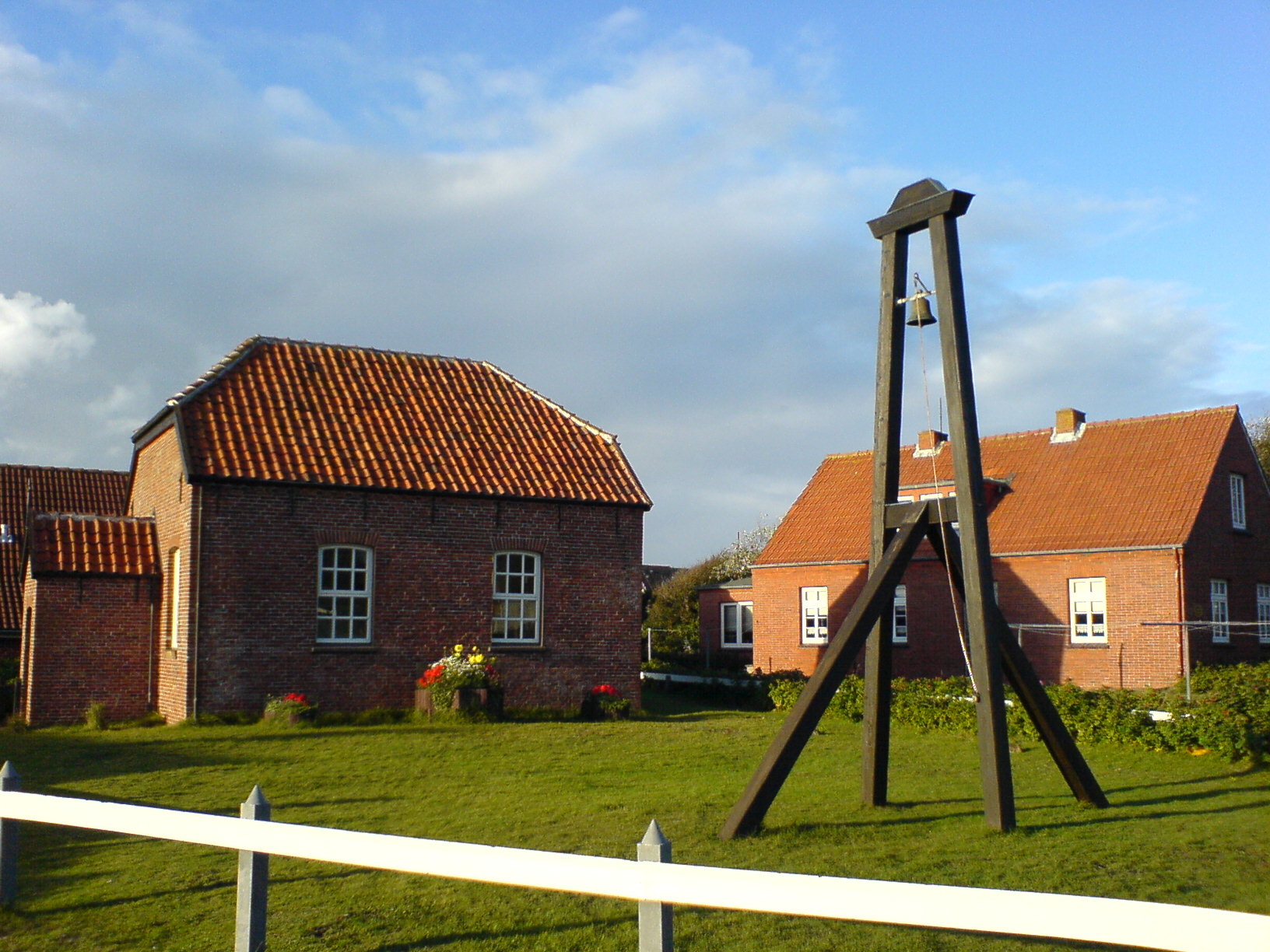
Old church of the island

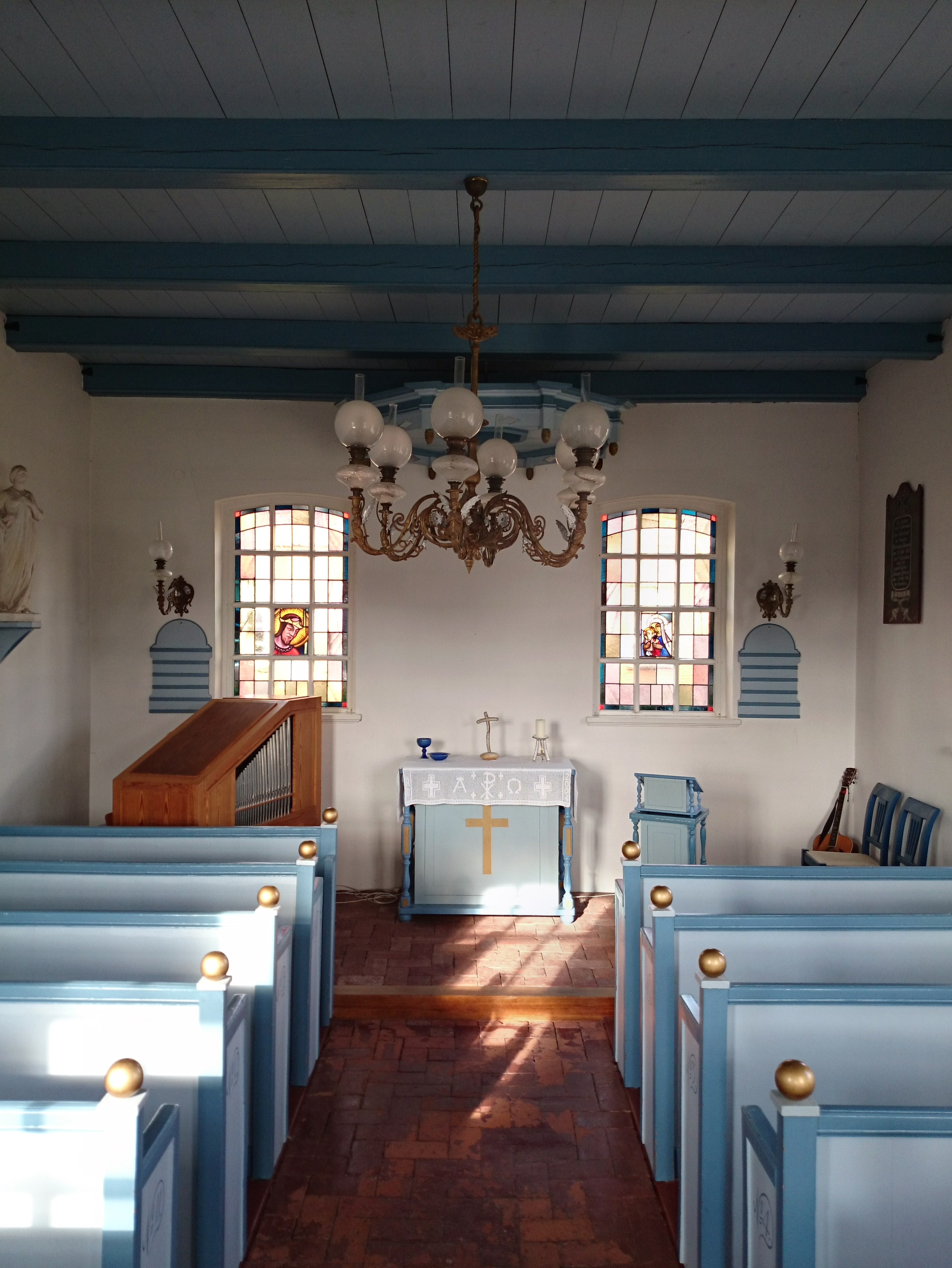
Old church of the island indoors

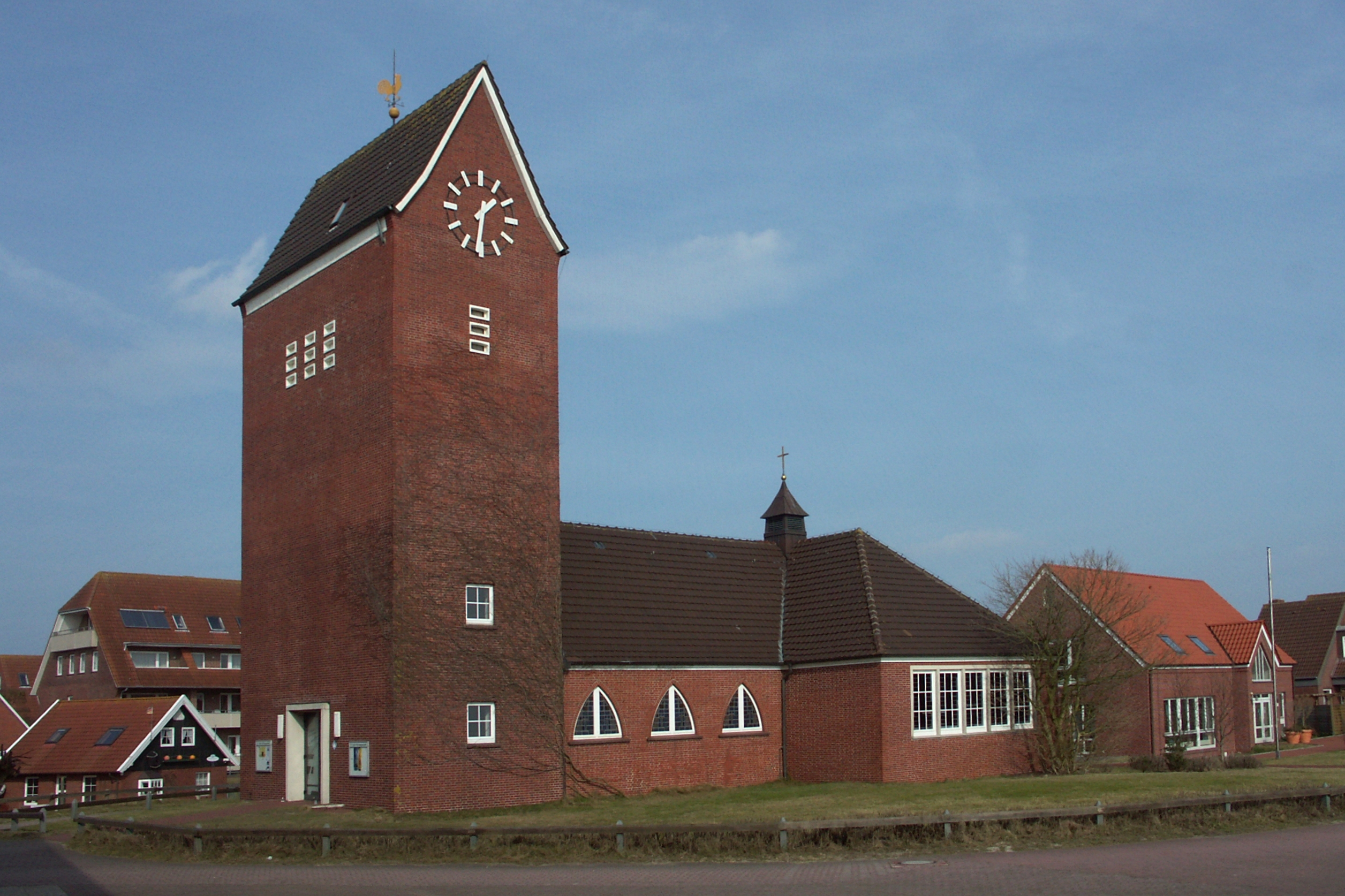
Great Lutheran church of the island

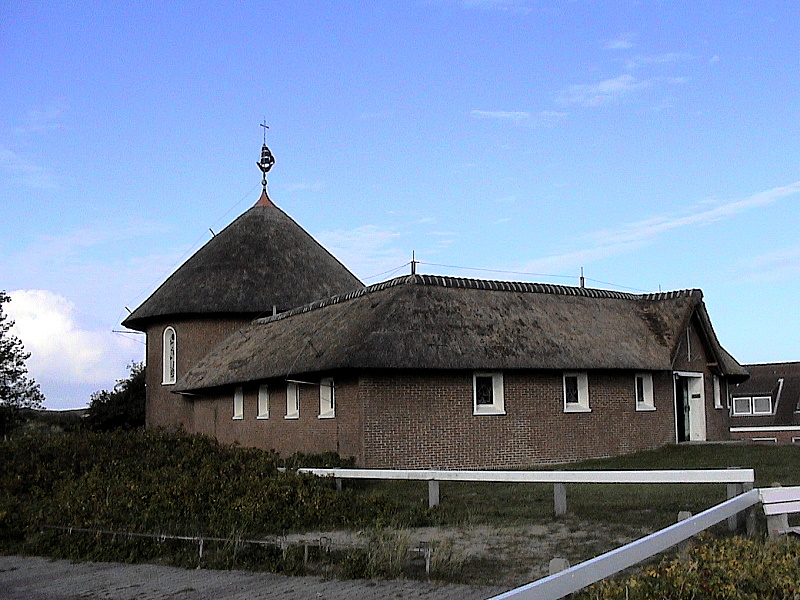
Saint Nicholas church

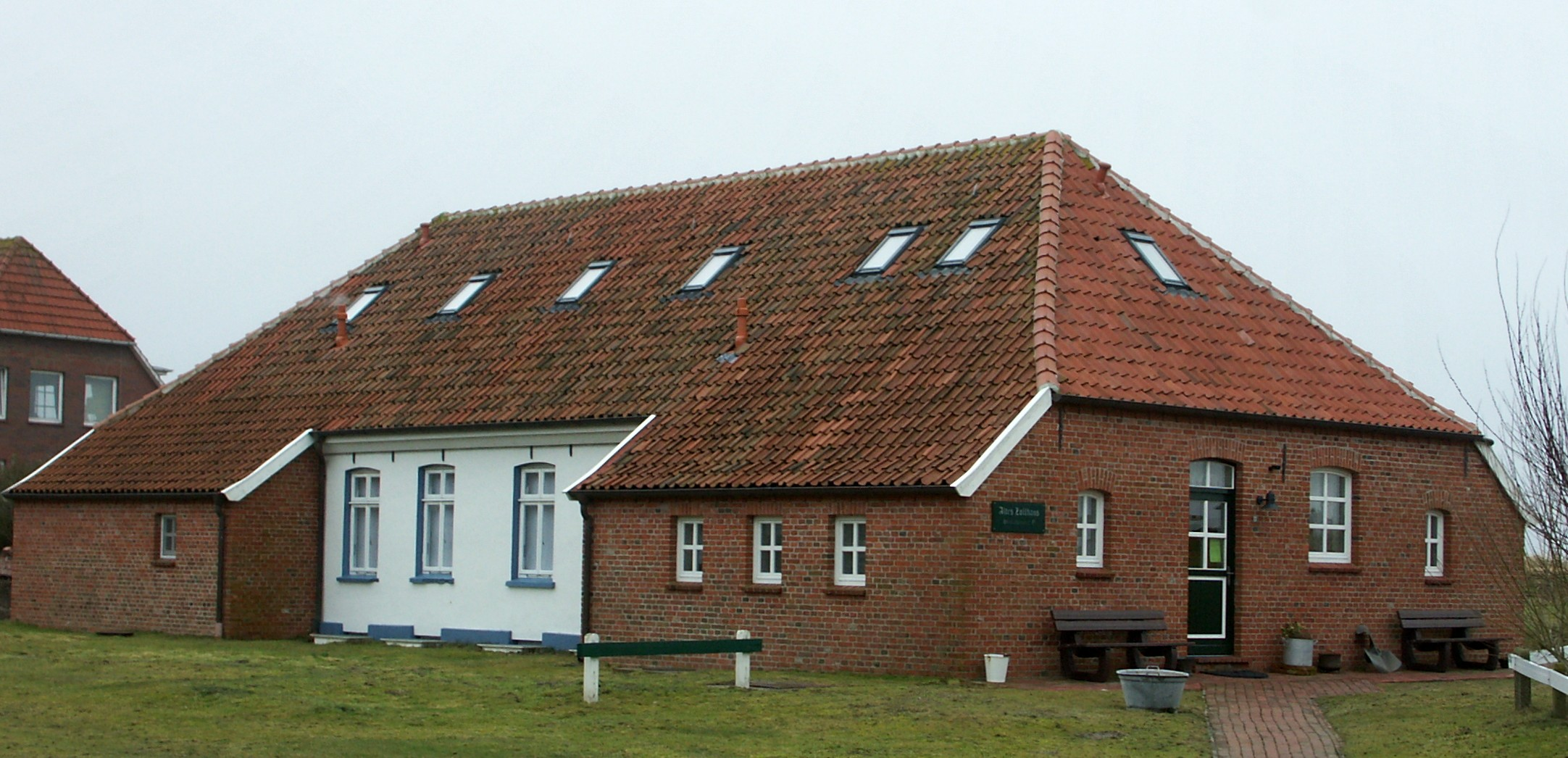
Museum of local history in the old custom house

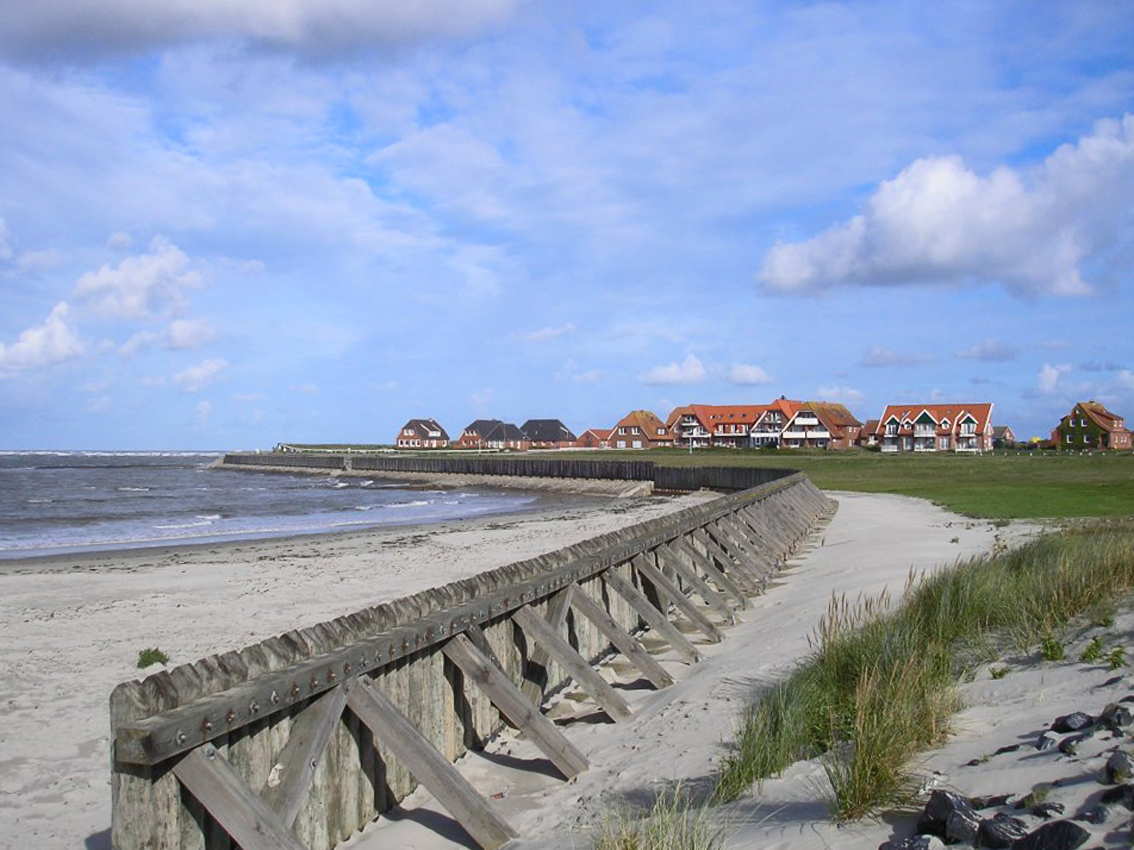
Historical palisade for protection

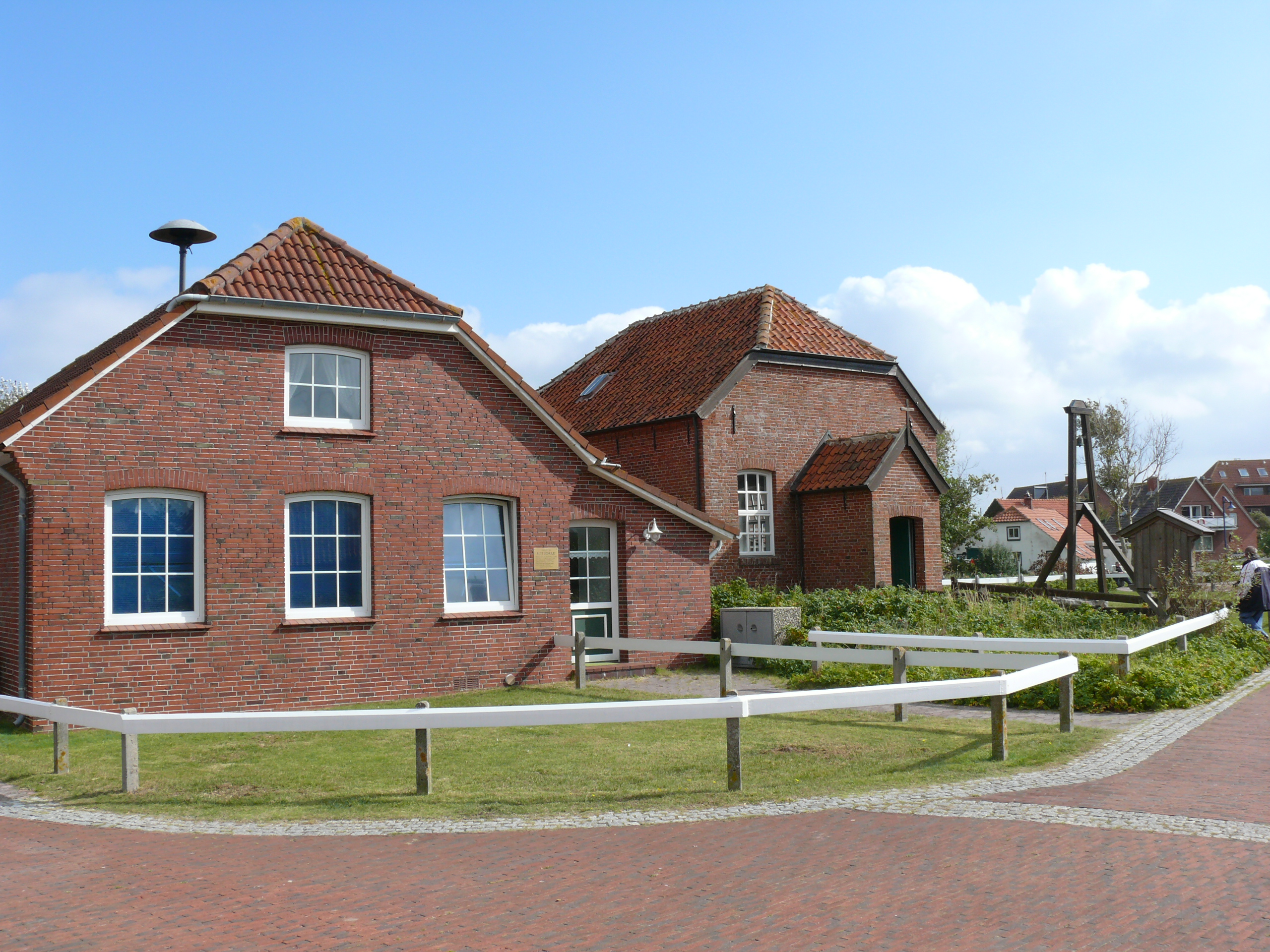
Former school

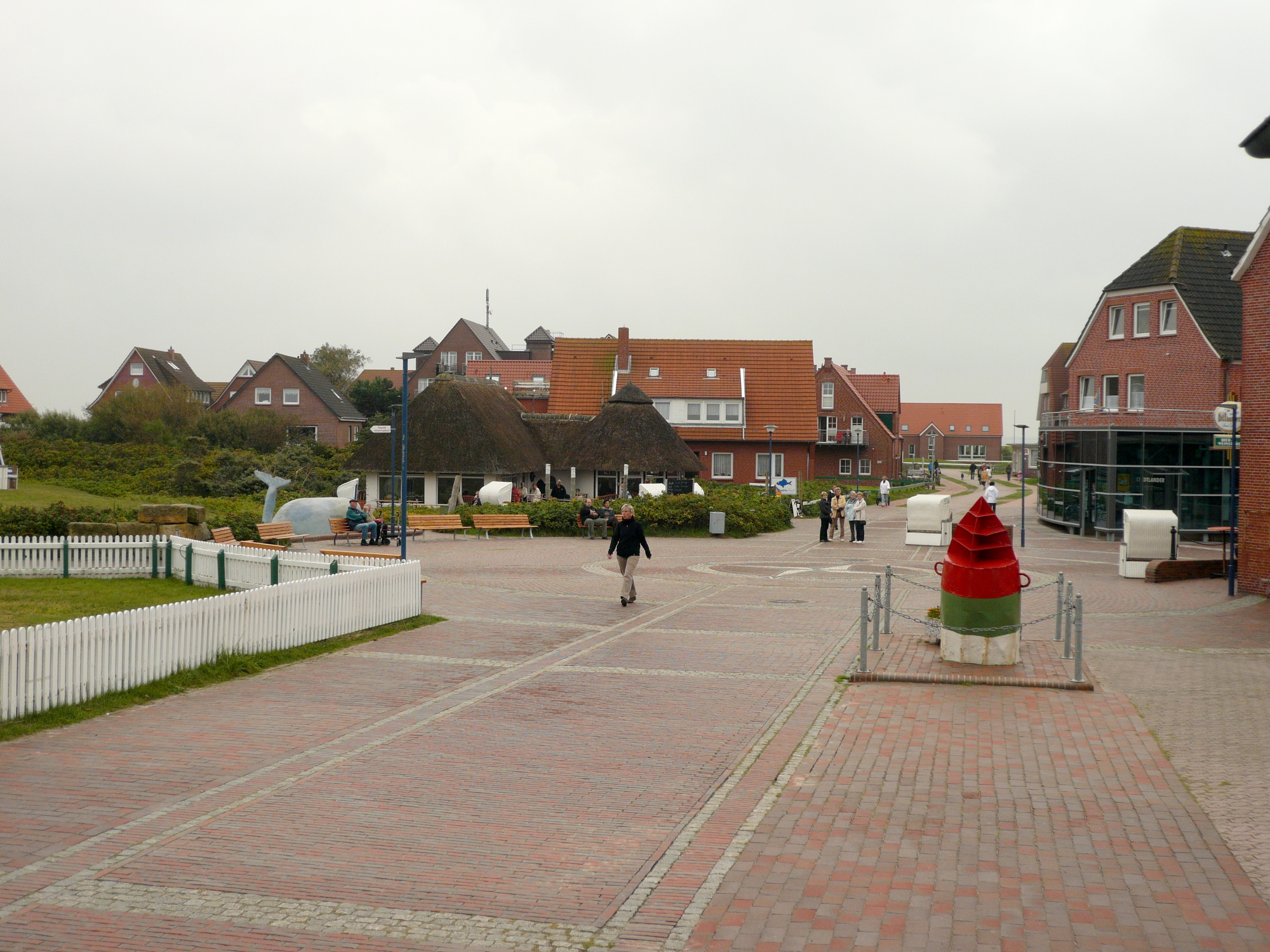
Heart of the Western village of Baltrum

== Traffic ==
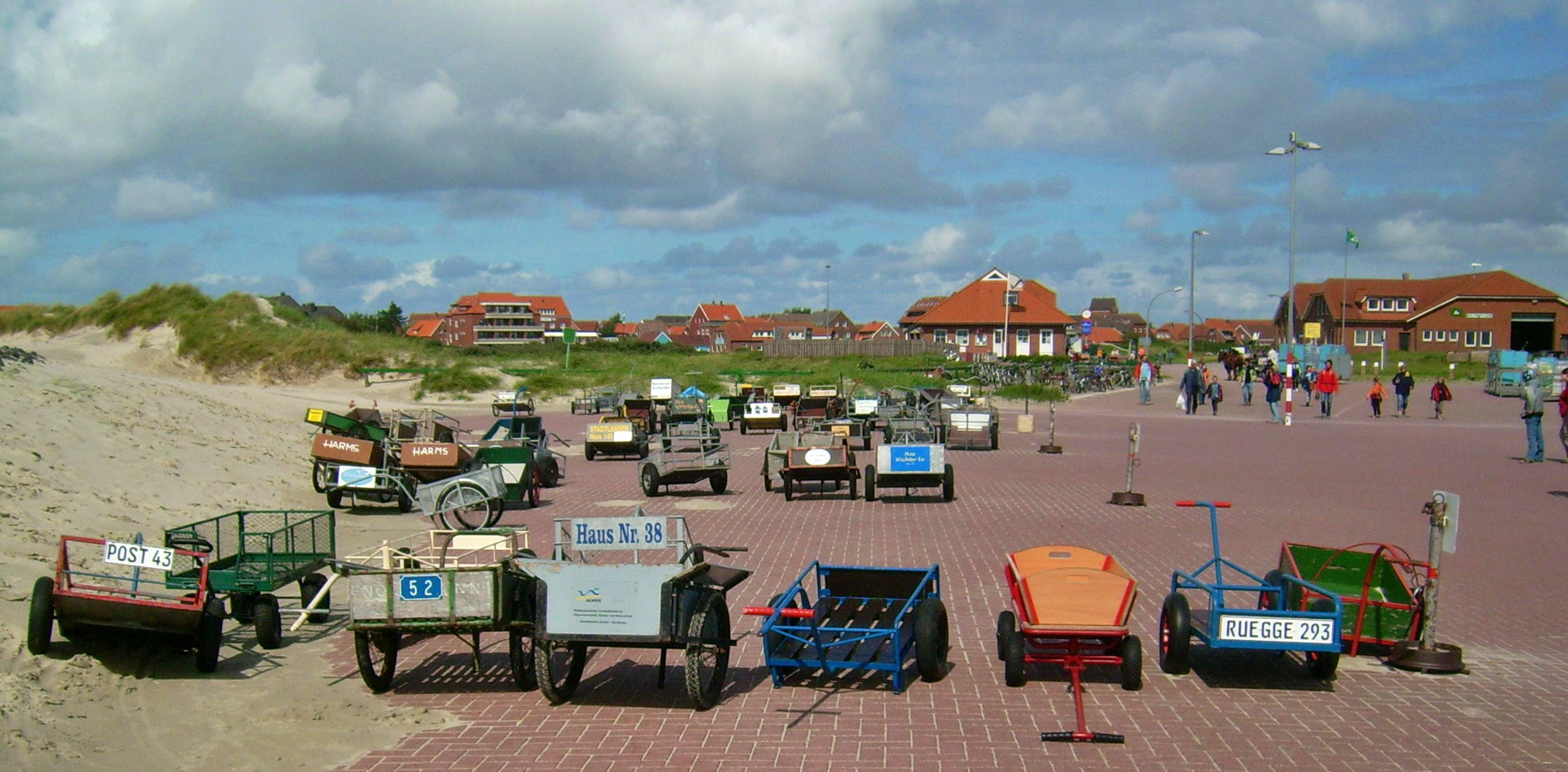
Car-free Baltrum

Baltrum is a completely car-free island, because of the traffic ban of all kind of motor vehicles. The only exceptions are vehicles of the volunteer fire department, an ambulance, a few wheel loaders and some machines needed for the coastal protection. From 1949 until 1985 there was a small single track Inselbahn Baltrum (English: Baltrum Island Railway) which was an unelectrified narrow gauge railway for baggage and cargo transportation. No bicycle sharing system exists on Baltrum and the tourists are asked not to bring their own bicycles onto the island, riding bicycles is the privilege of inhabitants. The passenger and freight transportation is accomplished by horse-drawn carriages. The baggage is transported by two-wheeled or four-wheeled carts or also carriages, use of electrical bicycles is the latest trend.

There are no street names on Baltrum, and postal addresses are related to the chronology of the development of the areas meaning that the numbering is geographically independent.

There is a search and rescue station presently on Baltrum which is operated by the German Maritime Search and Rescue Service.

== Transport ==
=== Ferry services ===
Baltrum is tidal independent laid by ferries owned by the shipping company Baltrum Line, founded in 1928, starting in Neßmersiel. The journey takes about 30 minutes and depending on the season and tourist season one ferry leaves once up to four times for each direction daily. The baggage is containerized and transported in the same ferry as the vacationers. The highlights of the passage are the seals on the shoals ahead of Norderney passed by the ferry. The shipping company manages a bus connection to the train station of Norden, Lower Saxony. Until 2006 the freight traffic was accomplished with the ferry Baltrum II via the port in Norddeich, Lower Saxony, but since then is transacted via the port in Neßmersiel. The port of Neßmersiel was inaugurated in 1970 and extended by a cargo wharf with 35 metres (115 ft) in length from April to August 2008 due to the relocation of the freight transportation.

=== Airport ===
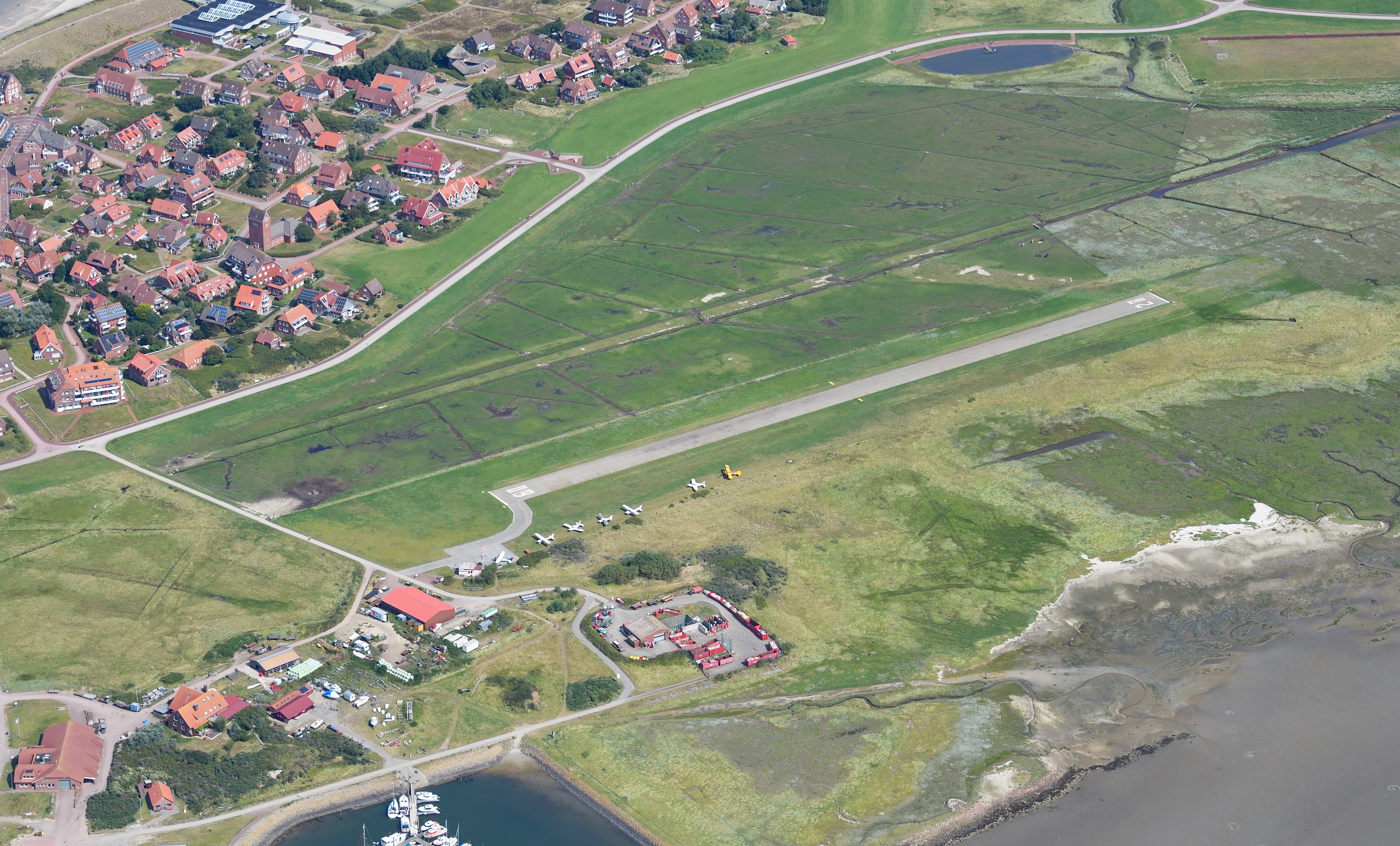
Baltrum Airstrip

The Baltrum Airfield (ICAO: EDWZ) is a small special-use airfield located on the East Frisian island of Baltrum in Lower Saxony, Germany, serving as an important transport link between the car-free island and the mainland. Established in the early 1970s, the airfield developed alongside the growth of tourism and local infrastructure, with a paved runway completed in 2002 to improve operational reliability. The airfield features a single paved runway (09/27) measuring approximately 360 m in length and 15 m in width and lies only a few metres above sea level on the low-lying “Heller” area of the island, which can be affected by storm surges and high tides. Due to its short runway and environmental restrictions, operations are limited primarily to light single-engine aircraft, motor gliders, ultralight aircraft, and helicopters. Scheduled and charter flights—most notably short connections to Norden-Norddeich—play a significant role in supplying residents and transporting visitors, making aviation an essential complement to ferry services for this remote North Sea community.

=== Walk ===
At the event of low water Baltrum is reachable from the port of Neßmersiel as a guided walk across the mudflats taking 2.5 hours.

== Literature ==
- Richard Pott (1995), Farbatlas Nordseeküste und Nordseeinseln: Ausgewählte Beispiele aus der südlichen Nordsee in geobotanischer Sicht (in German), Stuttgart: Verlag Eugen Ulmer, ISBN 3-8001-3350-4
