= Neßmersiel =

- Village of Dornum
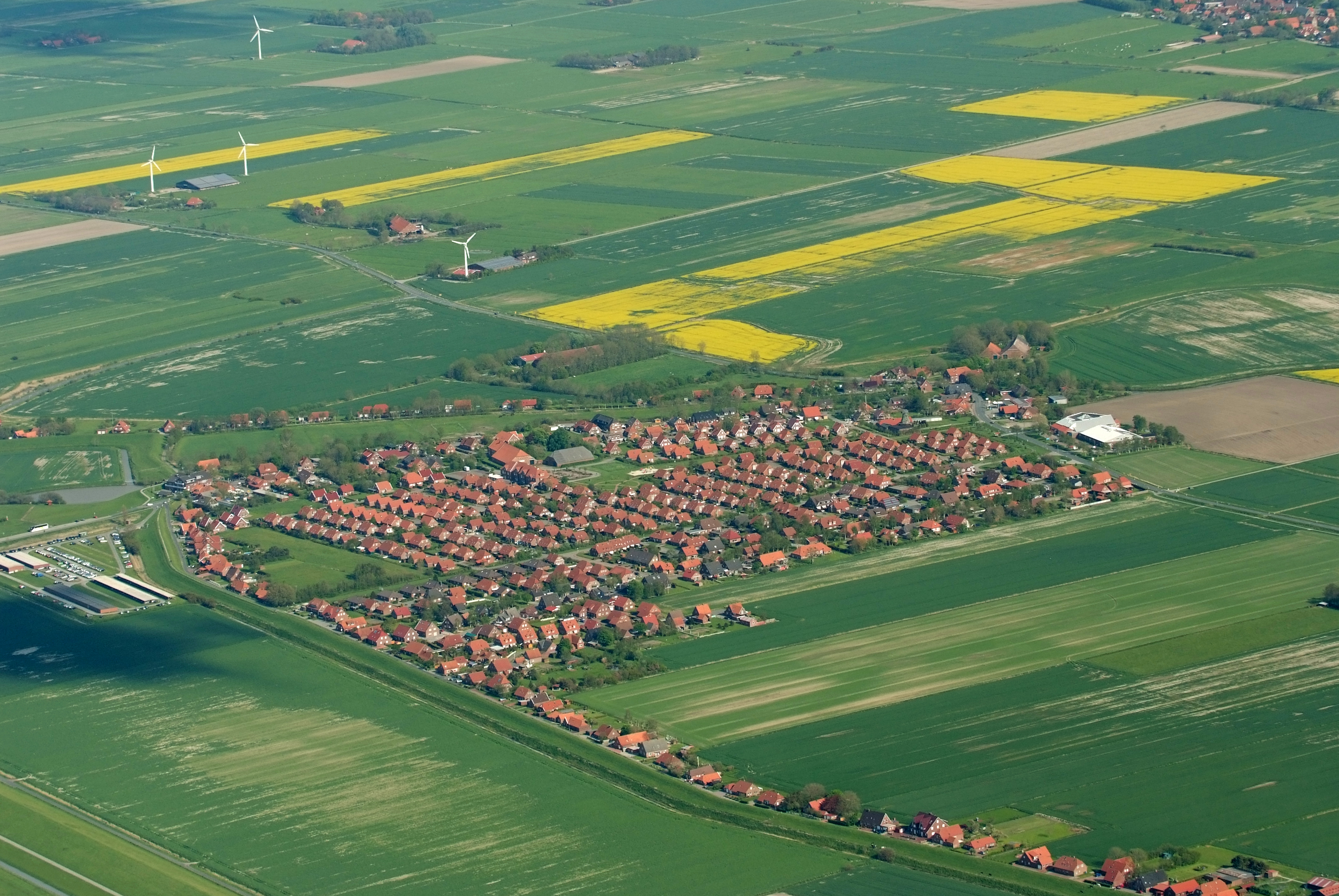
- Aerial view of Neßmersiel

- Coat of arms
- Interactive map of Neßmersiel
- Location within Germany Location within Lower Saxony
- Coordinates: 53.67091°N 7.35336°E
- Country: Germany
- State: Lower Saxony
- District: Aurich
- Municipality: Dornum
- Elevation: 2 m (6.6 ft)

Population
  - Metro: 355
- Time zone: UTC+01:00 (CET)
  - Summer (DST): UTC+02:00 (CEST)
- Dialling codes: 04933
- Vehicle registration: 26553

Neßmersiel is an East Frisian village and seaside resort on the Wadden Sea coast in Lower Saxony, Germany. It is an Ortsteil of the municipality of Dornum, in the district of Aurich. Neßmersiel is located about 5 kilometers northwest of Dornum.

The village of Neßmersiel lies directly behind the dike and contains mostly holiday homes. There are also restaurants, hotels, cafes, and numerous shops. A playground for children is at the beach. Most coastal tours of the north German sea coast begin at Neßmersiel. Each year 10–12 million migratory birds visit the nearby Lower Saxon Wadden Sea National Park.

== Etymology ==
Neßmersiel is a former sluice village with a sluice operating from 1600 to 1953. The place was recorded for the first time in 1599 as Nesser Zill. In 1719 it was recorded as Nesmer Siel: "the sluice belonging to Nesse".

== History ==
The original port was built about 1570. Grain was shipped to Bremen, Hamburg, the Netherlands and Norway. By 1700, the harbor had to be moved closer to the sea when the original location was filled with silt from the dikes. By 1930, the new location was also closed. The ferry to Baltrum was built in 1969/1970.

A Bavarian sex comedy was filmed near Neßmersiel in 1973 ("The East Frisian Report"). You can still find some locations from the movie.

From 1867 to 1977, Neßmersiel belonged to the district of Norden.

== Gallery ==
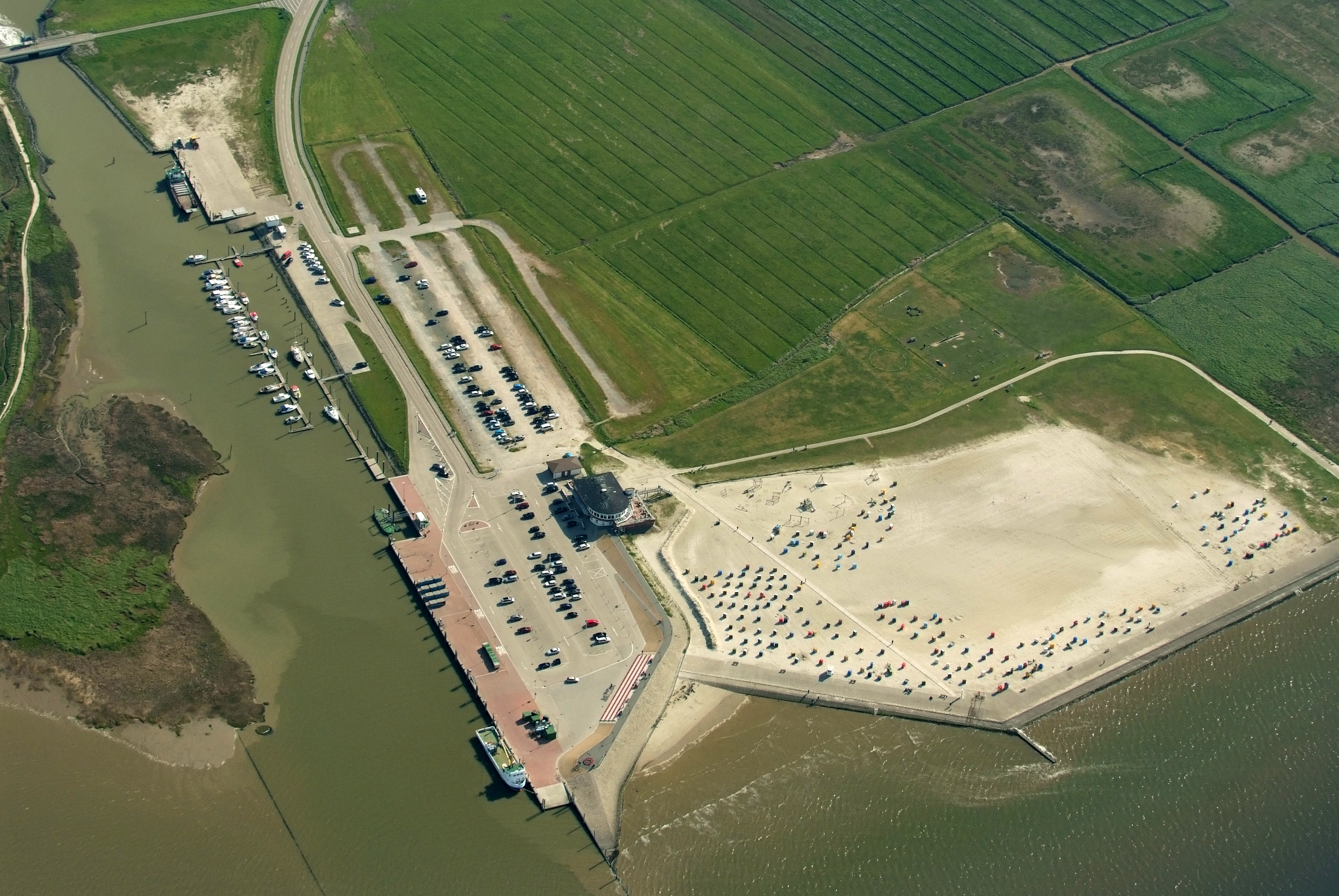
Port of Neßmersiel

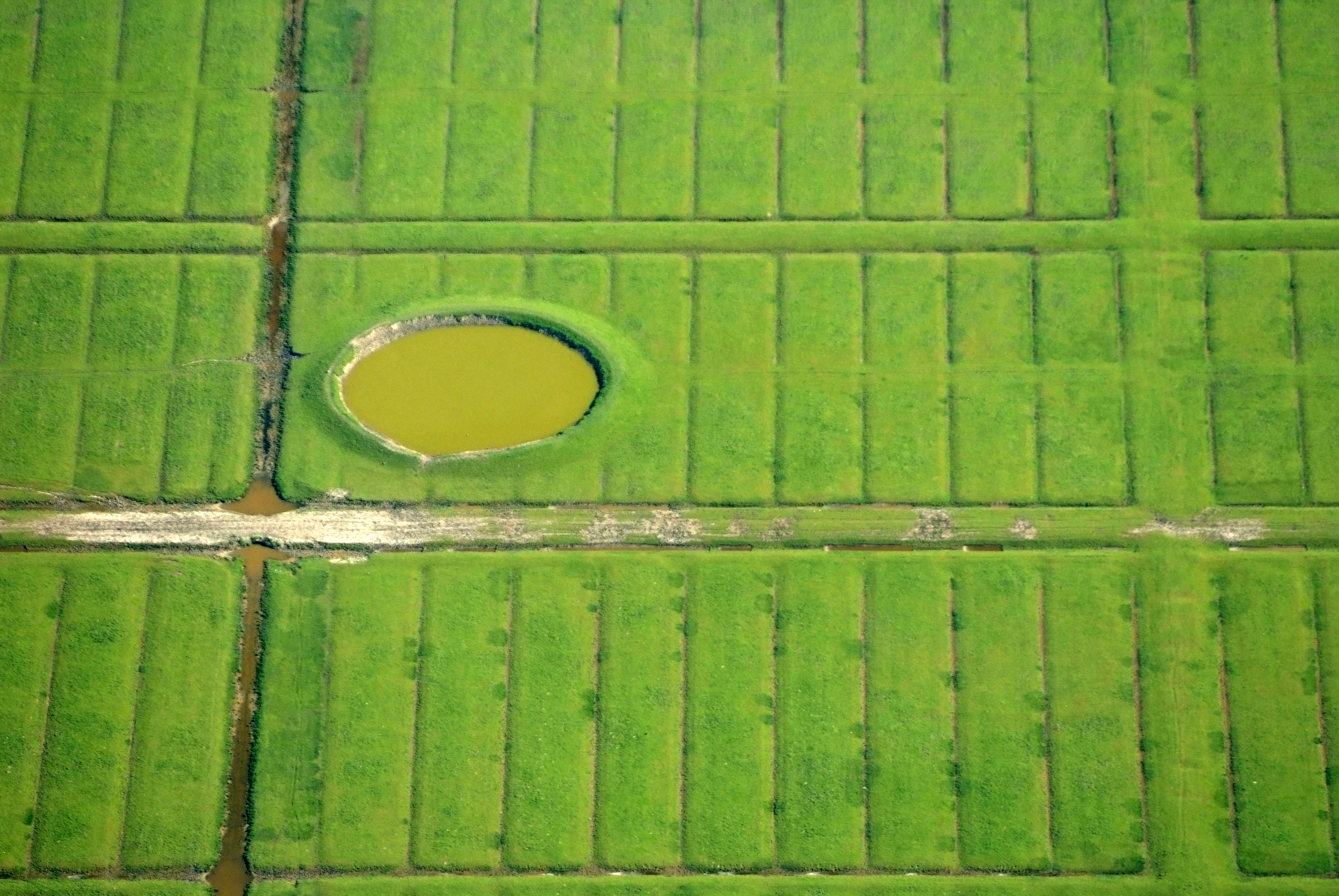
Bomb crater from the Second World War

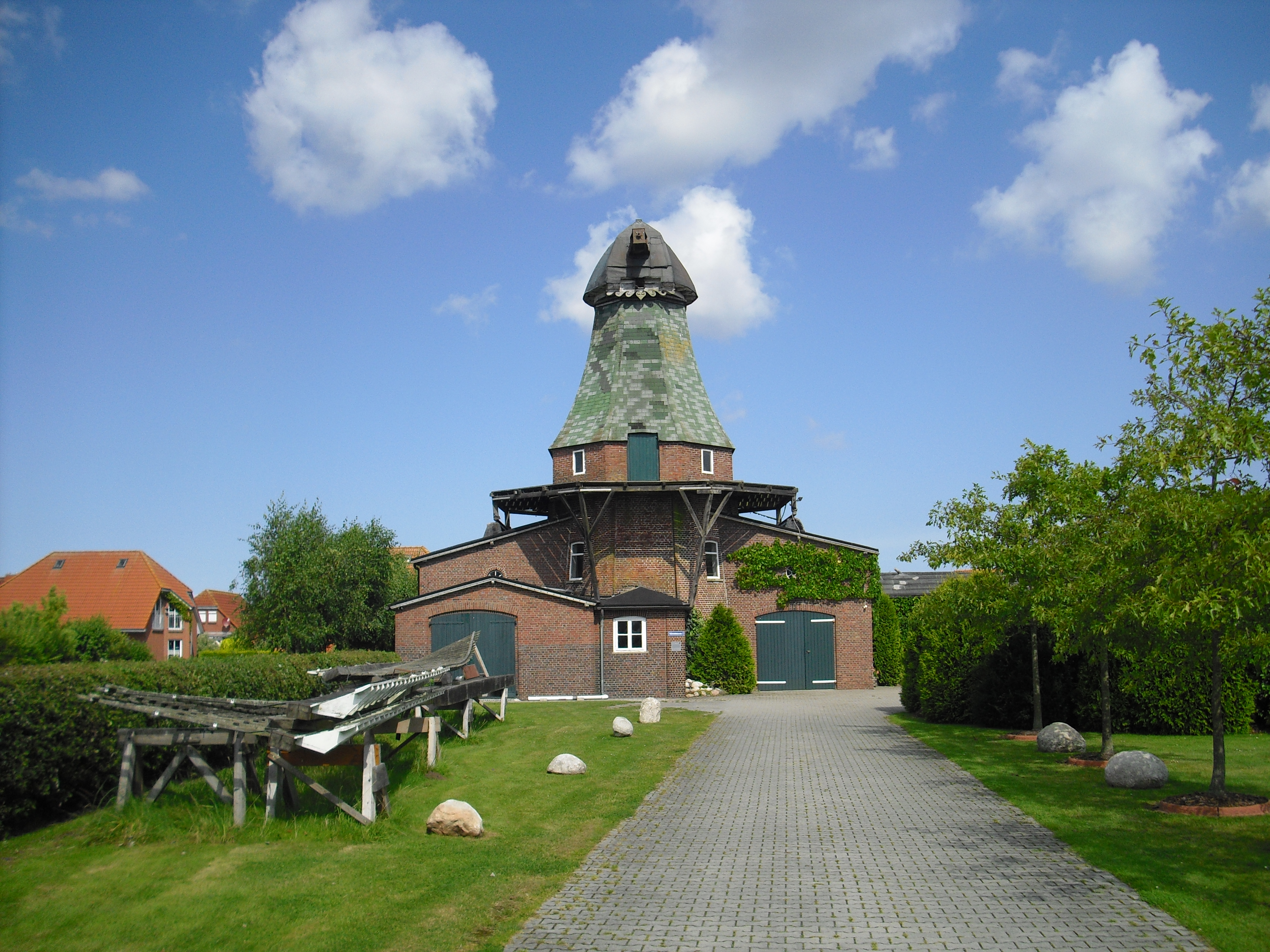
Windmill
