= Blaue Balje =

Coordinates: 53°45′44″N 7°57′51″E

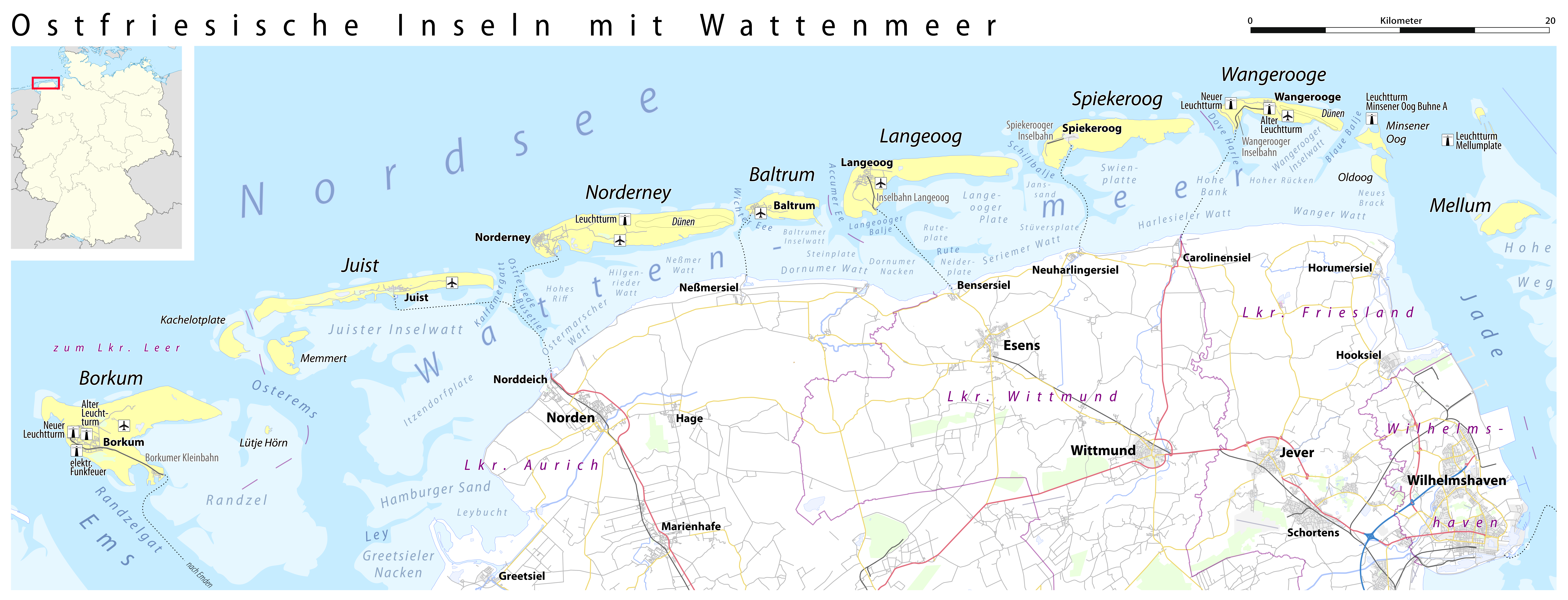
In the east the Blaue Balje between Wangerooge and Minsener Oog

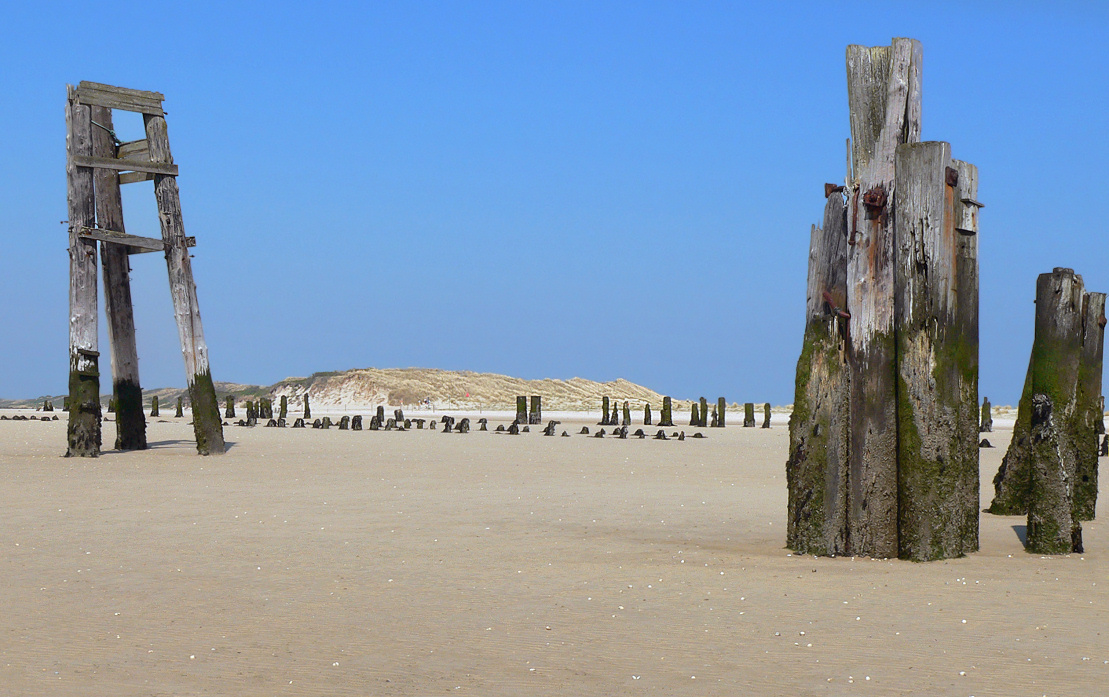
Remains of Wangerooge's East Pier

The Blaue Balje is a gat in the southeastern North Sea in the outer estuary of the Jade.

It runs in a north-south direction between the East Frisian Islands of Wangerooge and Minsener Oog. Its main channel divides towards the south into the three channels of Telegraphenbalje, Mittelbalje and Minsener Balje. The location and depth of the actual shipping channel in the Blaue Balje is subject to constant changes.

At the eastern tip of Wangerooge are the stumps of posts that supported the old landing stage of the East Pier (Ostanleger). The landing stage was abandoned in 1958 and has since fallen increasingly into ruins. From 1905 to 1958 the East Pier was the main landing stage on Wangerooge and a terminus on the island railway. As on the other East Frisian Islands, a lot of sand was deposited on the eastern side of Wangerooge, the resulting silting up making it increasingly difficult to land at the East Pier. The dredging needed to keep the pier accessible was not cost-effective, and in 1958 the pier was closed and the eastern section of the island railway dismantled.
