= Strait of Baltiysk =

Strait in Kaliningrad Oblast, Russia

Coordinates: 54°38′28″N 19°52′42″E

Sambian peninsula

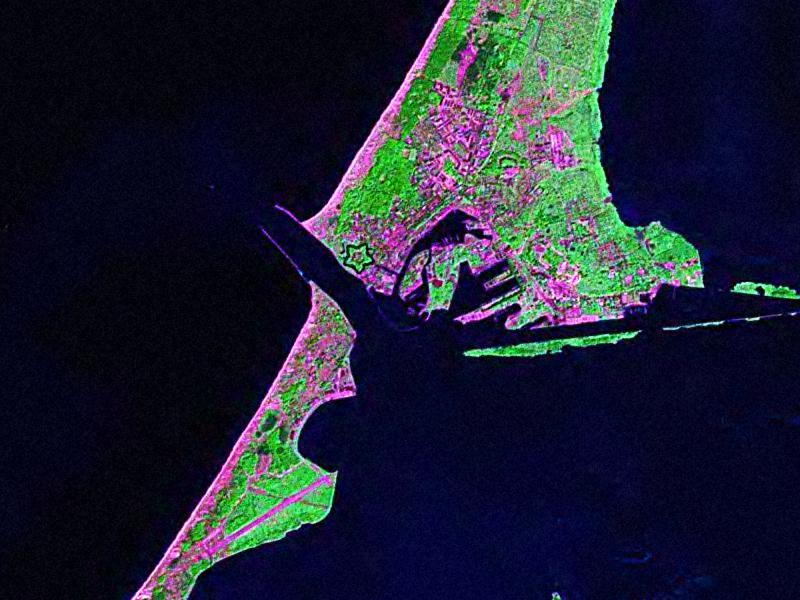
Landsat satellite photo taken circa 2000

The Strait of Baltiysk (Russian: Балтийский пролив, Polish: Cieśnina Piławska, German: Pillauer Tief) is a strait enabling passage from the Baltic Sea into the brackish Vistula Lagoon, located in Kaliningrad Oblast, Russia. The strait, initially a storm-created gat and later expanded via construction, separates the Vistula Spit on the south side from the peninsula containing the town of Baltiysk on the north side (called Pillau Peninsula in Russia: Пиллауский полуостров, after the Pillau Fortress). The latter peninsula was part of the Vistula Spit in the 15th century and now is part of the larger Sambia Peninsula.

== Shipping ==
The strait is the shipping connection from the high sea to the important Russian ports of Baltiysk and Kaliningrad in the northeastern lagoon. It also provides access to the Polish ports of Elbląg, Braniewo, Tolkmicko, Frombork, Sztutowo, Krynica Morska, and Nowa Pasłęka in the southeastern lagoon.

International navigation through the Strait of Baltiysk is governed by a non-suspendable innocent passage regime under the United Nations Convention on the Law of the Sea (dead-end strait). Despite the law, Russia since the 1990s has periodically blocked navigation to Polish ports via the strait.

From 2006, Poland considered digging another canal across the Vistula Spit to circumvent this restriction. Poland started construction of the Vistula Spit canal in 2019 and opened it on 17 September 2022 (symbolically the same day in 1939 that the Red Army invaded Poland), allowing ships to enter the Polish port of Elbląg without passing through the Strait of Baltiysk.

== History ==
In 1497 a storm surge dug a new gat, then called the Neues [Pillauer] Tief or Pillauer Seetief (New [Pillau] Deep, Pillau Sea Deep), through the Vistula Spit. In 1510 another storm surge widened and deepened that gat to navigability. It measured 550 metres (1,800 ft) in length and 360 metres (1,180 ft) in width. In 1626 King Gustavus Adolphus of Sweden landed with 37 ships next to the gat, at a spot already slightly fortified, transforming it into the Pillau Fortress, and holding it for ten years (till the Treaty of Stuhmsdorf), also in order to pressure his brother-in-law George William, Duke of Prussia and Elector of Brandenburg, to support him in the Polish–Swedish War and the Thirty Years' War. The Swedes extended the adjacent Pillau village and built its first place of worship, a Lutheran church. In 1638 the Duke moved his residence to the close-by ducal capital Königsberg in Prussia.

In the 1960s the gat was expanded and now it measures 400 metres (1,300 ft) in width and 12 metres (39 ft) in depth.
