= Wichter Ee =

Coordinates: 53°43′27″N 7°21′16″E

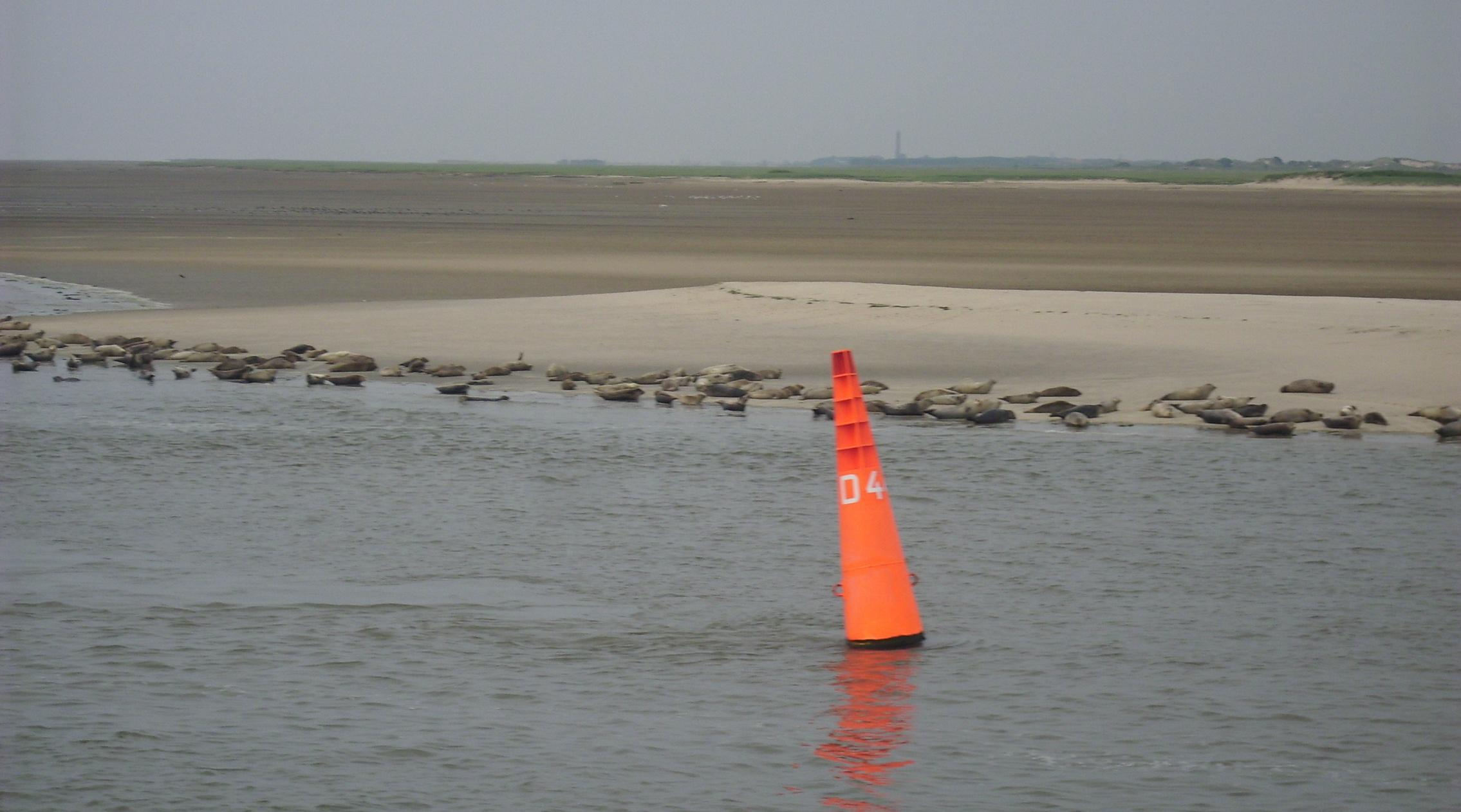
Common and grey seals on the western shore of the Wichter Ee

The Wichter Ee is a gat between the East Frisian Islands of Norderney (to the west) and Baltrum (to the east).

At the eastern end of the island of Norderney in the Wichter Ee are sandbanks occupied by common and grey seals. The western end of Baltrum is formed by the port and massive coastal defences, that protect the island from storm surges driven by westerly winds that would otherwise flood the island.
