= Otzumer Balje =

Gat in the North Sea

Coordinates: 53.75°N 7.63333°E

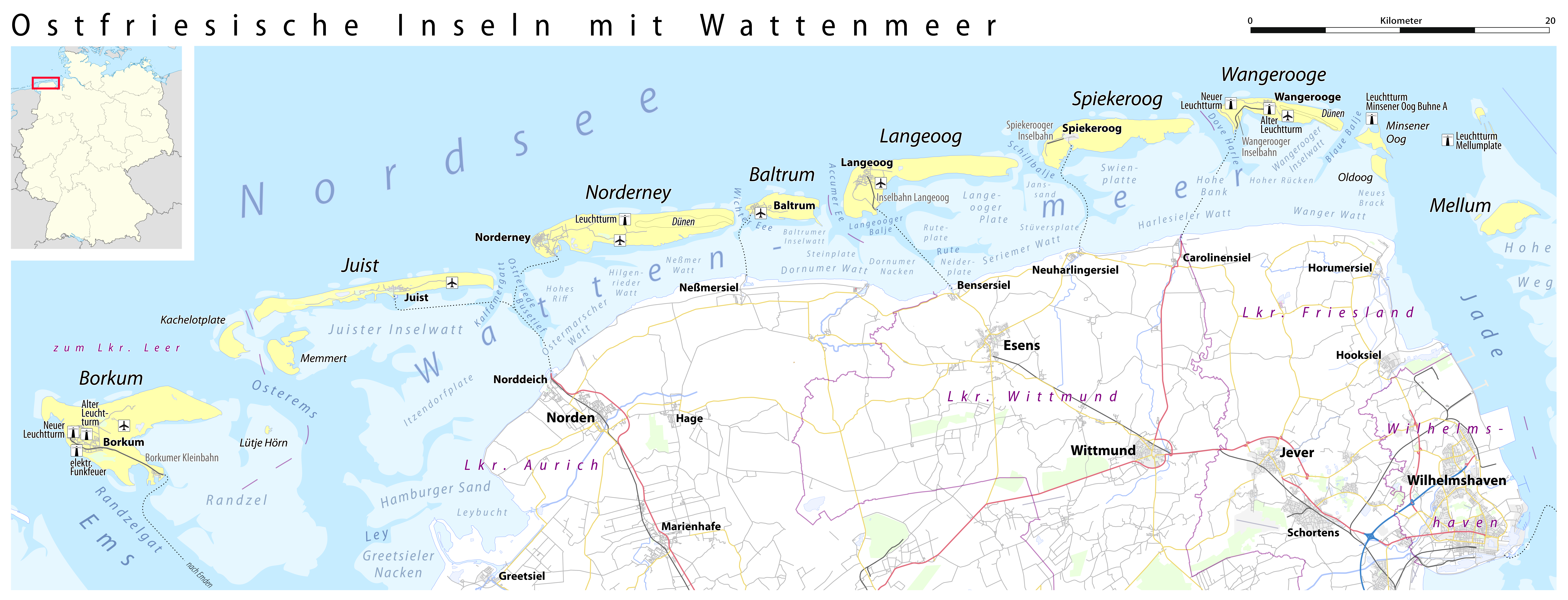
Location of the Otzumer Balje between Langeoog and Spiekeroog

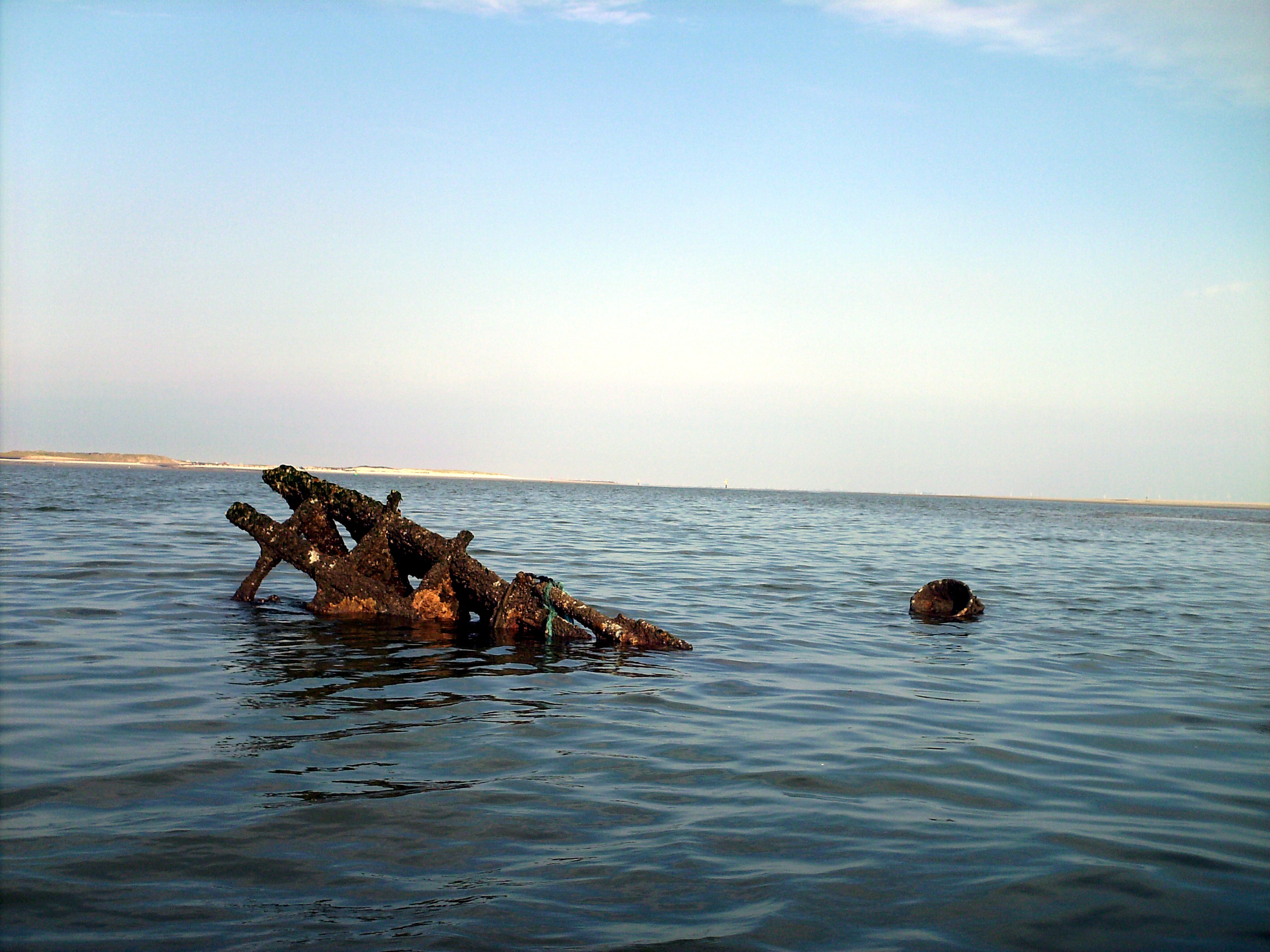
Wreck of the Heinrich Horn

The Otzumer Balje is a gat in the North Sea.

The gat runs in a north–south direction between the eastern end of the North Sea island of Langeoog and the western end of neighbouring Spiekeroog. About five kilometres below the Otzumer Balje there is a salt dome, 1.5 to 3 kilometres thick and 6,000 metres in diameter - containing Zechstein salts. The shipping channel is marked by navigation aids and has a depth of up to 19 metres. On 5 December 1917 the steamer, Heinrich Horn, built in 1900, sank here. Its wreck is still visible at low tide.
