= Hamza Balje =

Kosovan politician

Vice Minister of Economic Development
- Incumbent
- Assumed office 2018

Member of the Assembly of the Republic of Kosovo
- In office 2010–2014

Personal details
- Born: Restelica, Kosovo
- Party: Nova Demokratska Stranka
- Occupation: Politician

Hamza Balje (born 13 September 1970) is a Kosovan politician of Bosnian origin. He served as a member of the Kosovan Assembly from 2010 to 2014 and was appointed as a Vice Minister for Economic Development in 2018. Balje is the founder of the Center of Democratic Union, a political subject later integrated to the Nova Demokrataka Party (Nds).
