= Gat (landform) =

Relatively narrow but deep strait that is constantly eroded by currents

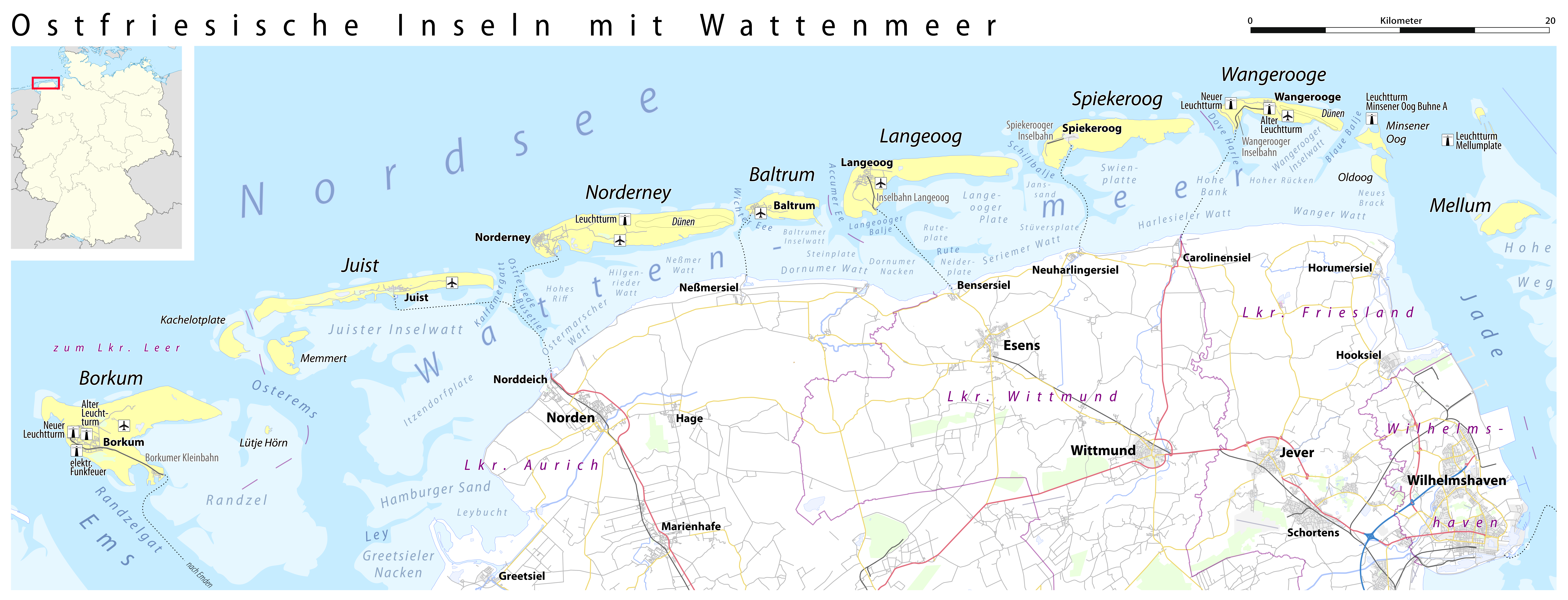
Map of the East Frisian Islands, showing the gats between the islands

A gat (Dutch: zeegat, gat; German: Seegatt, Seegat or diminutive Gatje) is an inshore channel or strait connecting coastal waters with the open sea or dividing two landmasses, such as two islands or an island and a peninsula. Gats are usually relatively narrow but deep and are in many instances constantly eroded by currents flowing back and forth, such as tidal currents. The term is mostly used for features on the North Sea and Baltic Sea coasts.

According to Whittow a gat is either a strait dividing offshore islands from the mainland e.g. the Frisian Islands, or it is an opening in a line of sea cliffs allowing access to the coast from inland. The term sometimes also refers to a shallower passage on lagoon coasts, including those without any tidal range, and can also refer to shallow bars in an area of mudflats.

It is similar, but not identical, to a gut, which is usually a strait subject to strong tides, a term mostly (but not entirely) used in North America. Leser restricts the use of "gut" in Europe to deep, but relatively narrow inlets in the Wadden Sea that are scoured out by currents, giving the example of the gap between the Frisian islands of Juist and Nordeney.

In Dutch the term can be interpreted quite broadly, as it can refer to an entrance to the open sea formed by the mouth of an inlet, an inland sea or even a river; and also to an opening between coastal islands or coasts in general.

== Description ==
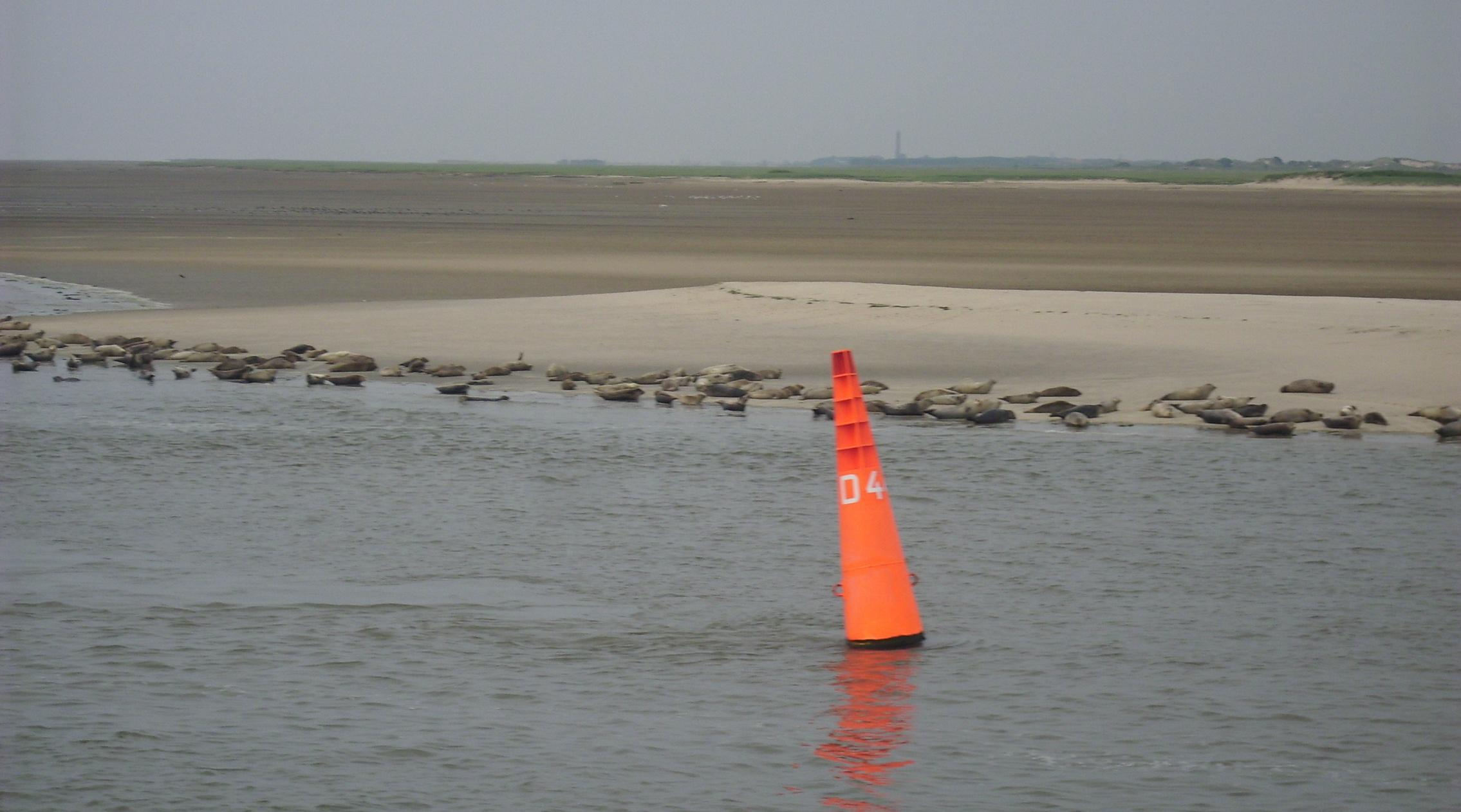
Common seals and Grey seals on the western shore of the Wichter Ee, a gat between Norderney and Baltrum

The term "gat" is primarily (though not exclusively) applied to waterways of the North Sea and Baltic Sea coasts of Europe. A similar term of related but not identical meaning, gut, is mainly applied to channels of the coastal waters of the Atlantic coast of North America.

Passages between inner and outer coastal waters, such as at the ends of spits of lagoons or along bodden coasts are also referred to as gats.

=== Tidal effects and erosion ===
The comparatively large quantities of water that flow quite quickly through a gat cause heavy erosion that results in a channel deeper than the rest of the surrounding seabed and also endangers neighbouring islands. When the water masses from mud flats behind the islands surge out again into the sea as ebb currents, they flow rapidly again through the narrow gat. But as these water masses break out into the open sea, they spread out and slow down. As a result, on this seaward side of the gat, the particles of sand and mud carried with the water settle and form an ebb delta with its shallower waters between the islands. The sandbanks so formed are often known in Germany as plate (pronounced "plah-ter", see Kachelotplate). The point where the water pouring out of the gat runs over these banks, which often lie in an arc between the islands, is the sand bar (German: Barre). This is the shallowest part of the gat for shipping, but also the deepest point on the shallowest line between the islands. A flood delta is formed in a similar way on the landward side of the gat.

A navigation channel to the open sea is usually marked out in the gats by the waterway and shipping authorities. The area of the bar is usually the most dangerous spot; this is where rip tides and, especially when the current flows against the wind, very dangerous ground swells may occur.

== Etymology ==
The name comes from the Low German and Dutch word "gat" which means "gap". "Gat" is incorporated into some Dutch or Dutch-derived proper names of passages (e. g. Kattegat, Veerse Gat) which may or may not be proper gats. In English names, both "gat" (e. g. Fisherman's Gat) and "gut" (e. g. Digby Gut, Hull Gut, Gut of Canso) are seen.

In German, "Gat" (as well as "Seegatt" and the diminutive "Gatje") can refer to an arm of the sea which is not necessarily subject to strong tidal currents; for instance, the Prerower Strom ("Prerow Stream"), which is a regressive delta, is a gat. Seegatt (also "Neues [Pillauer] Tief" [New {Pillau} Deep]) is the German proper name of the Strait of Baltiysk (Pillau) which connects the Vistula Lagoon to the Baltic Sea.

The name of Hell Gate, a gat (or gut) in the East River of New York City, is derived from archaic Dutch Hellegat (meaning possibly "clear opening"), a fairly common toponym (place name) for waterways in the Low Countries.

== List of gats ==
The following is a list of gats, including named gats that may or may not be true gats as defined above:

=== German Bight ===
- Blindes Randzelgat
- Dukegat
- Dwarsgat
- Emshörngat
- Evermannsgat
- Großputengat
- Haaksgat
- Harle-Seegatt
- Homme Gat
- Horsborngat
- Hubertgat
- Hungat
- Kalfamergat
- Nordergat
- Norderneyer Seegat
- Otzumer Balje
- Randzelgat
- Riffgat
- Rütergat
- Skittgat
- Spaniergat
- Stickers Gat
- Wagengat
- Wichter Ee

=== Netherlands ===
- Amelander Gat
- Duinkers Gat
- East Gat, West Cappel
- Eijerlandse Gat
- Homme Gat
- Molengat
- North Gat, Texel
- Russian Gat, Vlie
- Schulpe Gat
- Veer Gat

=== Baltic Sea ===
- Kattegat (not strictly a gat despite its name)
- Seegatt

=== United Kingdom ===
- Cockle Gat, Yarmouth
- Fisherman's Gat, Thames Estuary
- Foulger's Gat, Thames Estuary
- Hasborough Gat, Yarmouth
- Nicholas Gat, Yarmouth

== See also ==
- Gut (coastal geography)
