= Hamburg Wadden Sea National Park =

German Wadden Sea National Park

- Nationalpark Hamburgisches Wattenmeer
- IUCN category II (national park)
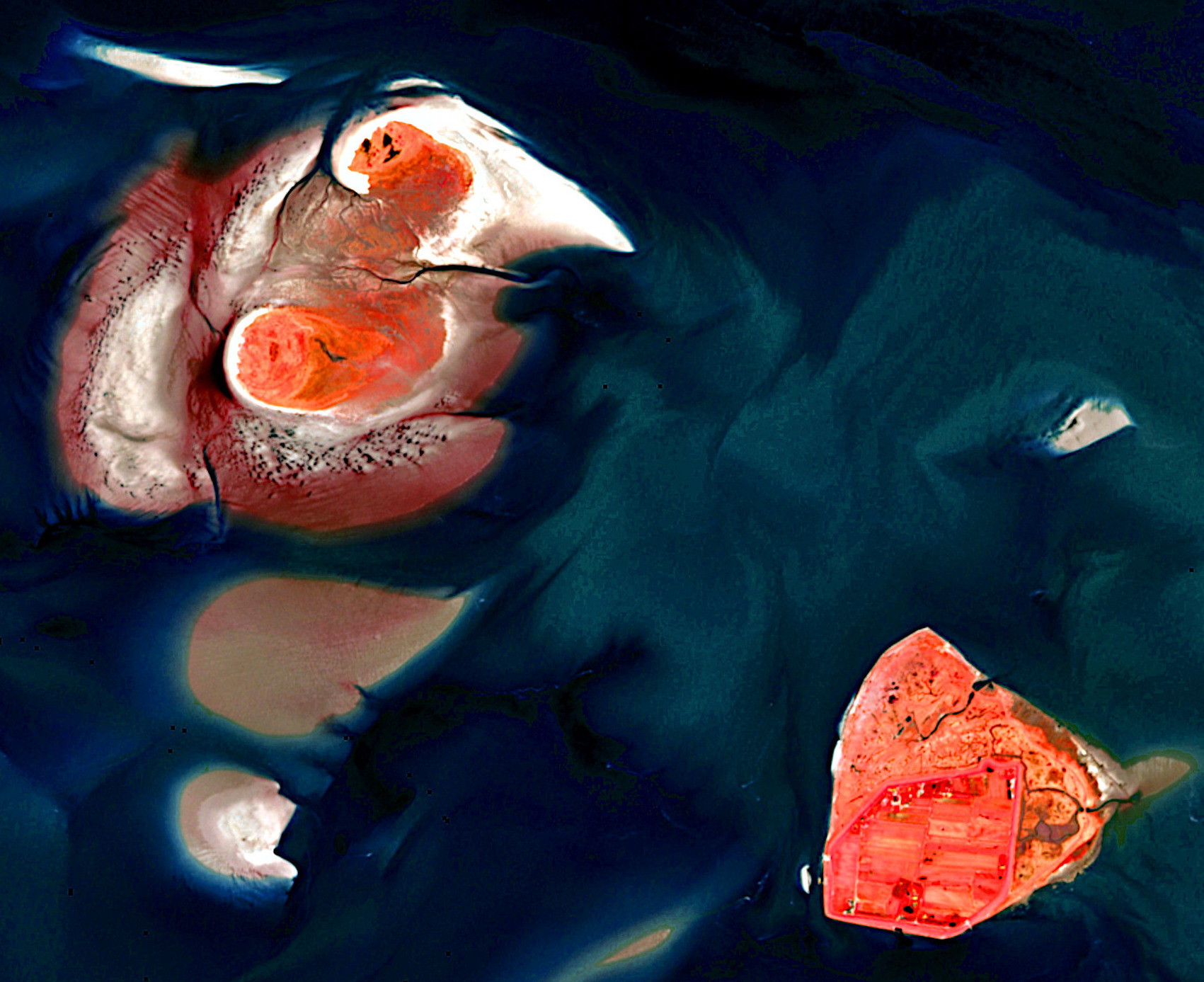
- Satellite picture of the 3 islands of the national park

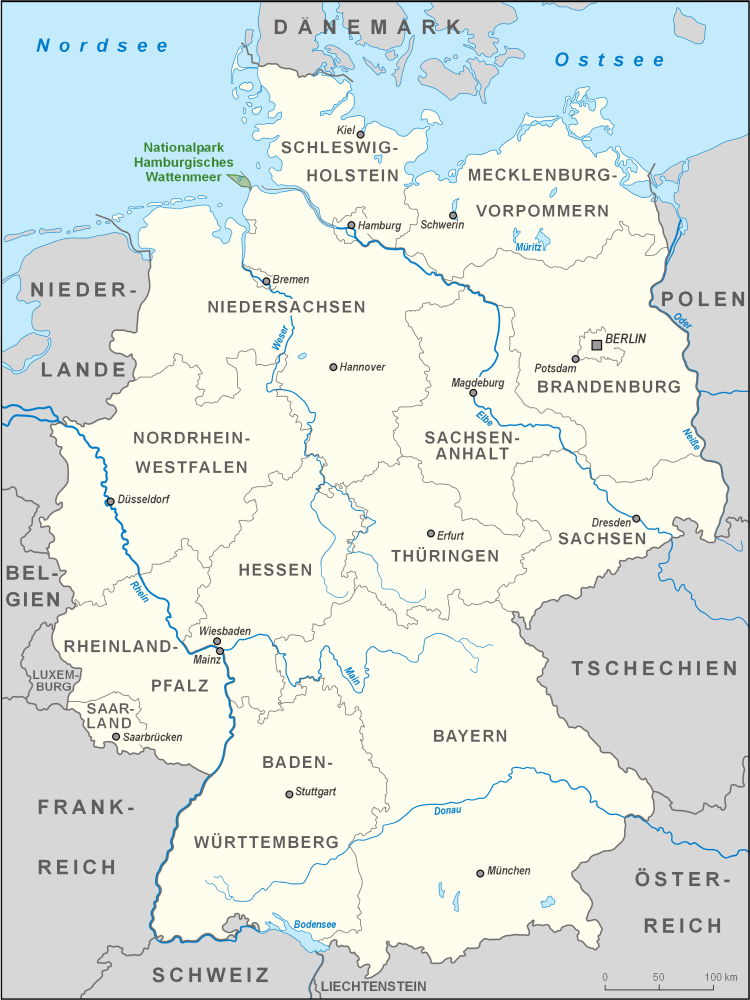
- Location of the park in northern Germany
- Location: North Sea coast, Hamburg, Germany
- Coordinates: 53°56′07″N 8°28′22″E
- Area: 13,750 ha (53.1 sq mi)
- Established: April 9, 1990

Ramsar Wetland
- Official name: Hamburgisches Wattenmeer
- Designated: 1 August 1990
- Reference no.: 501

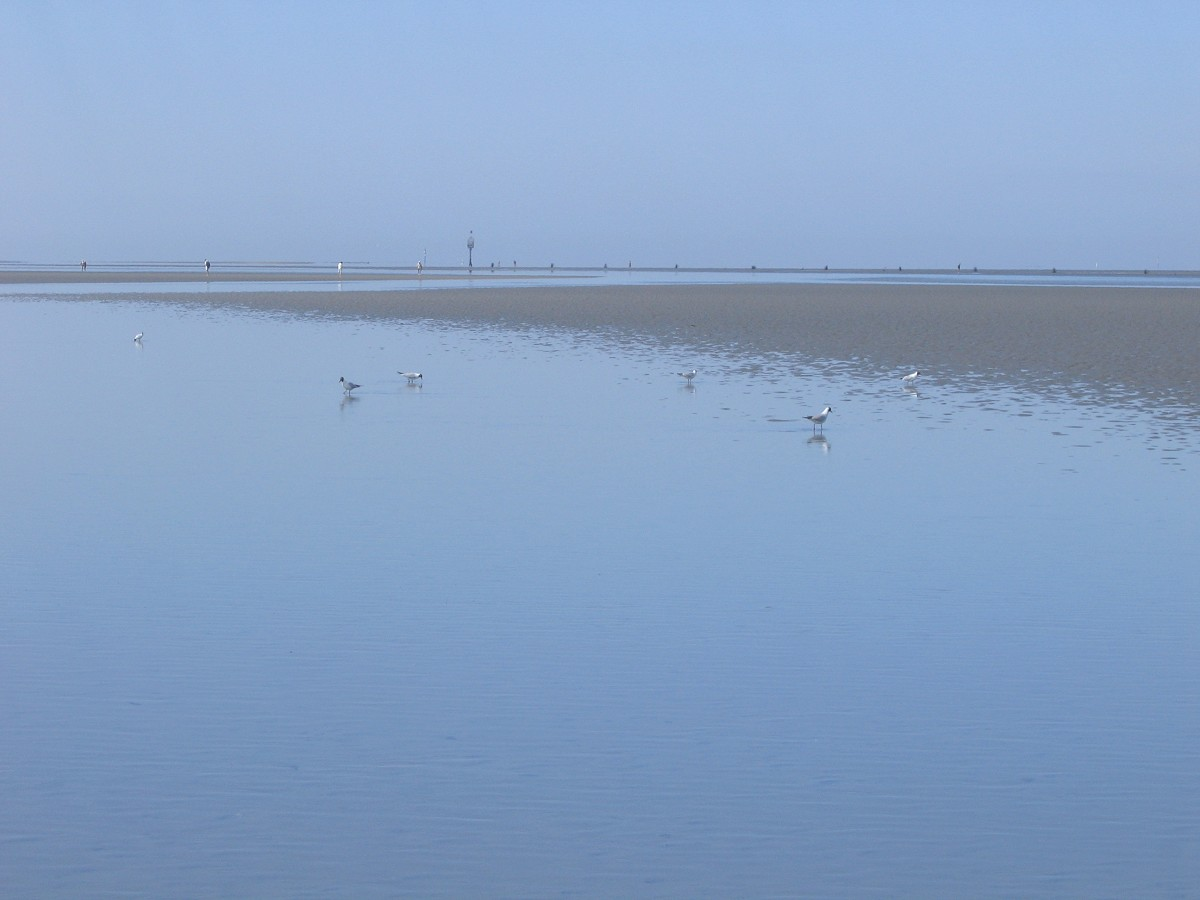
The Wadden Sea near Duhnen

Hamburg Wadden Sea National Park (German: Hamburgisches Wattenmeer) is the smallest of the three German Wadden Sea National Parks which protect the single ecological entity of the Wadden Sea reaching from Den Helder to Esbjerg.

It is an exclave of the city state of Hamburg in North Germany and lies 12.5 km off Cuxhaven in the estuary of the Elbe in the North Sea (German Bight) and includes the islands of Neuwerk, Scharhörn and Nigehörn. It is made up mainly of sand and mixed mudflats with shallow creeks, sand bars (Plaaten), and dune islands. In 2011 the national park was added to the Wadden Sea World Heritage Site, highlighting its intact intertidal ecosystem, importance as a breeding area for many species of birds, and uniquely high biodiversity.

== National park ==
Following a ruling by the Hamburg Parliament on 9 April 1990 the area was reclassified as the Hamburg Wadden Sea National Park. On 5 April 2001, the law was updated and the national park area expanded as a result.

The total area of the national park (Zones 1 and 2) is 13,750 hectares (53.1 sq mi). The Zone 1 areas are under special protection, limiting mudflat hiking and horse and carriage rides to designated routes.

Within the national park, there are about 2,000 animal species, of which about 250 are endemic to the salt marshes of the Wadden Sea. Of particular note are the common seal and the gray seal. Due to the natural influx of sediment, there is a high concentration of food for young fish and seabirds at the mouth of the Elbe. The national park is, therefore, an important resting and molting area for seabirds.

For example, shelducks live on the snails that are found in hundreds of thousands on the surface of the mudflats. The approximately 180,000 birds of the north-western shelduck population spend also their molting period from July to September in the Wadden Sea, which is protected by the three national parks in the states of Lower Saxony, Schleswig-Holstein and Hamburg. About 200,000 eider ducks also spend their molting season here; about 1,000 pairs of eiders also use the mudflats of the North Sea as a breeding area. Most of them breed on the island of Amrum.

At the same time, the Wadden Sea is a resting place for breeding birds from northern climes that eat up the fat reserves they need for successful breeding. As a result, there are about 10-12 million waders, geese, ducks and gulls in the Wadden Sea as a whole.

The park works closely with the Jordsand Society (Verein Jordsand), especially in the area of bird conservation.

== Biosphere reserve ==
Since 1992 the national park has also been designated as a biosphere reserve, something which increases the importance of the park, because since then it has been placed under international protection in accordance with the UNESCO programme, "man and biosphere". The national park management is responsible for the care of the biosphere reserve and its national aspects.

== Addresses ==
Nationalpark Hamburgisches Wattenmeer
Nationalpark-Station Neuwerk, Turmwurt
D - 27499 Insel Neuwerk
Tel.: 04721 / 69271

and

Behörde für Umwelt, Klima, Energie und Agrarwirtschaft
Nationalpark-Verwaltung Hamburgisches Wattenmeer
Neuenfelder Straße 19
D - 21109 Hamburg

== Sources ==
- Umweltbehörde Hamburg, Naturschutzamt, ed. (2001), Nationalpark-Atlas Hamburgisches Wattenmeer. Nationalparkplan: Teil I (= Naturschutz und Landschaftspflege in Hamburg, Schriftenreihe der Umweltbehörde, Heft 50) (PDF, 16,2 MB) (in German), Hamburg, pp. 1–165

== Filmography ==
- Im Nationalpark Wattenmeer. Documentary, 45 min., Germany, 1998, by Jens-Uwe Heins and Michael Sutor. Production: Komplett-Media-GmbH, Grünwald (ISBN 3-89672-492-4). Short description by ARD.

== See also ==
- Wadden Sea
- Lower Saxony Wadden Sea National Park
- Schleswig-Holstein Wadden Sea National Park
- Wadden Sea Conservation Station
- Mudflat hiking
