= Schleswig-Holstein Wadden Sea National Park =

National Park in Schleswig-Holstein, Germany

- Nationalpark Schleswig-Holsteinisches Wattenmeer
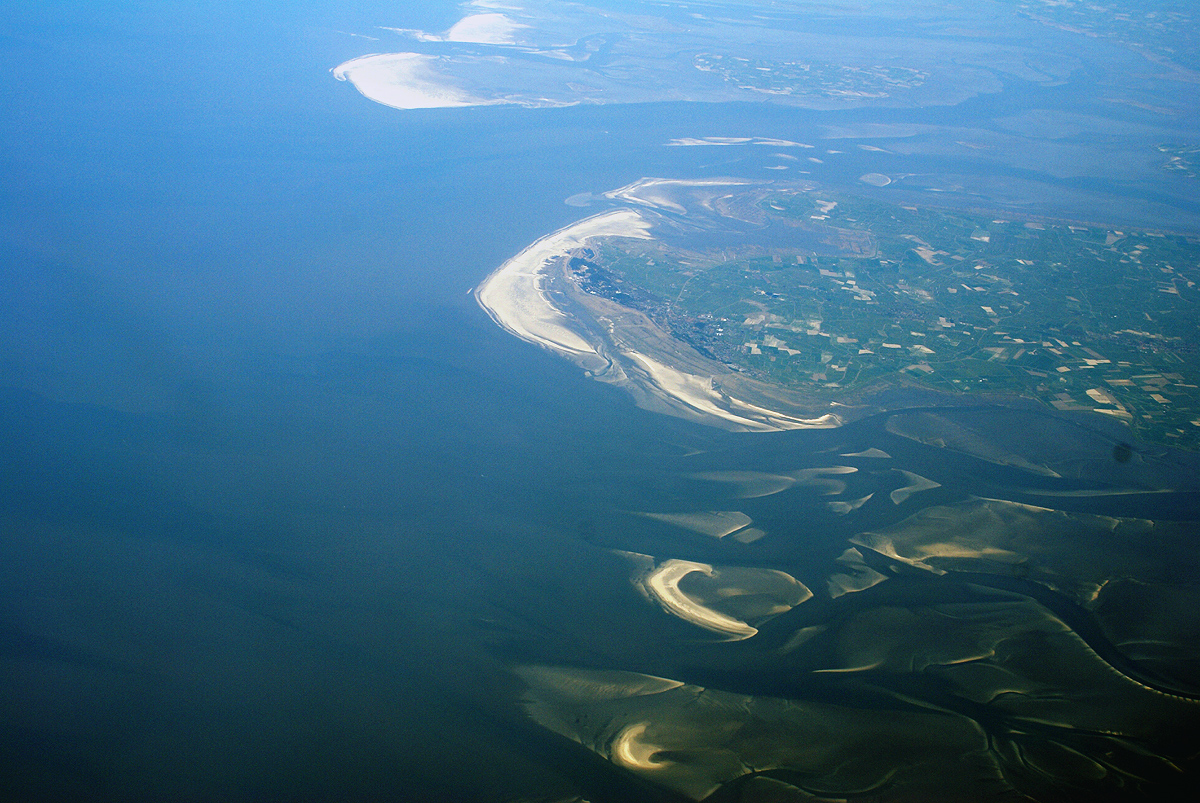
- Aerial photo of Trischen, Eiderstedt and the southern North Frisian barrier islands

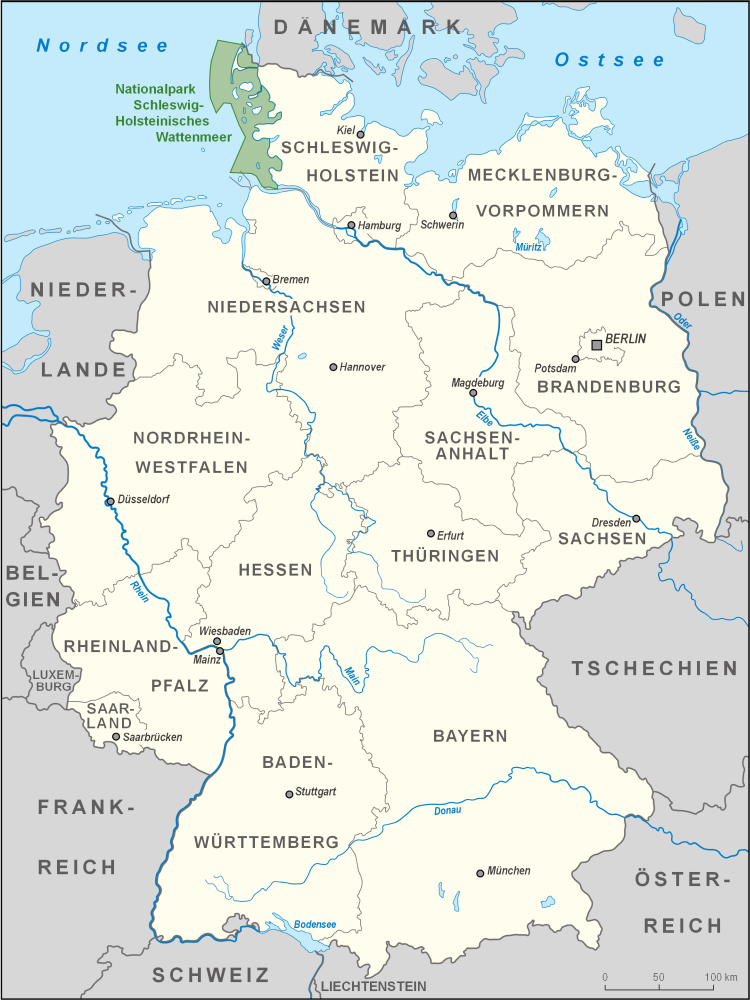
- The park is located in northern Germany
- Location: North Sea coast, Schleswig-Holstein, Germany; Address: Webseiten des Nationalparks; Schlossgarten 1; 25382 Tönning
- Nearest city: Westerland, Husum. Tönning. Heide
- Coordinates: 54°27′23″N 8°38′47″E
- Area: 441,500 ha (1,705 sq mi)
- Established: 1 October 1985
- Visitors: 1,746,293 (in 2002)

Ramsar Wetland
- Official name: Schleswig-Holstein Wadden Sea and adjacent areas
- Designated: 15 November 1991
- Reference no.: 537

Schleswig-Holstein Wadden Sea National Park (German: Nationalpark Schleswig-Holsteinisches Wattenmeer) is a national park in the Schleswig-Holstein area of the German Wadden Sea. It was founded by the Parliament of Schleswig-Holstein on 1 October 1985 by the National Park Act of 22 July 1985 and expanded significantly in 1999. Together with the Lower Saxon Wadden Sea National Park, the Hamburg Wadden Sea National Park and those parts of Elbe estuary which are not nature reserves, it forms the German part of the Wadden Sea.

The national park extends from the German-Danish maritime border in the north down to the Elbe estuary in the south. In the North Frisian area, it includes the mudflats around the geest-based and marsh islands and the Halligen (undyked islands). There, the mudflats are 40 km wide in places. Further south lie areas of mudflats which contain particularly large sandbanks. In addition to the plants and animals that are typical of the entire Wadden Sea, especially large numbers of porpoise, shelduck and eelgrass may be seen in the Schleswig-Holstein part.

With an area of 4410 km^{2} it is by far the largest national park in Germany. Some 68% of its area is permanently under water and 30% is periodically dry. The land element consists mainly of salt marshes. Since 1990, the national park, including the North Frisian Halligen, has been designated as a UNESCO recognised biosphere. Together with other German and Dutch Wadden Sea areas it became a UNESCO World Heritage Site on 26 June 2009 because of its relatively undisturbed intertidal ecosystem and its unique biodiversity.

== Geography ==
=== National park area ===
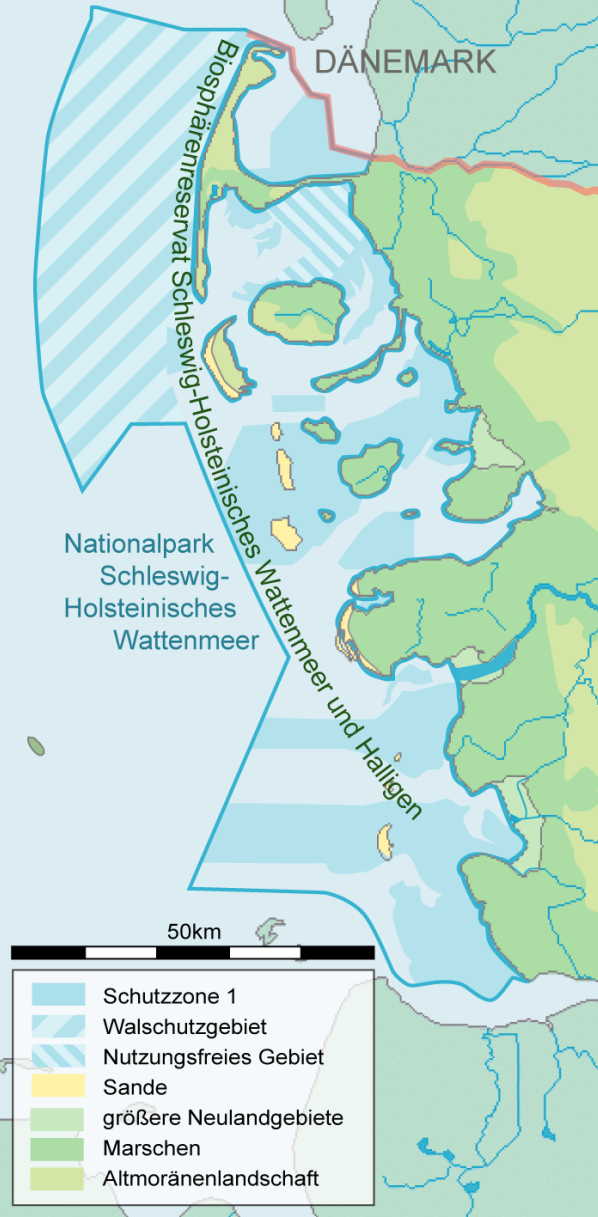
Map of the national park with designated protected zones

The national park covers an area from the North Sea coast of Schleswig-Holstein by the Danish border in the north to the Elbe estuary in the south. In the northern area (roughly as far as Amrum), the national park boundary extends to the twelve mile territorial limit; to the south it reaches to about the three mile line. On the land side it runs in the sea 150 metres off the coast. Sea dykes and the foreland immediately in front of the dykes are not part of the national park; beaches are thus largely excluded from the protected zone. Also excluded from the national park are the inhabited areas in the sea, including the five German North Frisian Islands and the larger Halligen islands of Langeness, Hooge, Gröde, Oland and Nordstrandischmoor. Part of the park comprises uninhabited islands, islets and Halligen, such as Trischen, Blauort or the North Frisian Barrier Island. Under the classification of the natural regions of Germany the national park area belongs to the "Schleswig-Holstein Wadden Sea, Islands and Halligen" region within the Schleswig-Holstein Marshes, and to the major unit of the German Bight.

The national park can be divided into two areas. In the north, between the Danish border and the peninsula of Eiderstedt is the North Frisian part; on the south coast of Eiderstedt up to the Elbe estuary is the Dithmarschen part. The North Frisian Wadden Sea, together with the Danish Wadden Sea, belongs to the North Sea. It is screened from the open sea by the North Frisian Islands and the Halligen. The islands were mainly formed from elements of the mainland, which became separated, mainly as a result of flood disasters. The mudflats are protected and the transition between the flats and the sea is often clearer, because the former lie to the east of the large islands and the latter to the west of them. There are no major river estuaries and the tidal range is relatively low at less than two metres. In the northern Wadden Sea there are still geest cliffs formed in the ice ages, so that the highest elevations occur here on the coast in an otherwise very flat area. The Dithmarschen part and the south coast between the Elbe and Eider estuaries form the central part of the Wadden Sea. A tidal range of over three metres has largely prevented the formation of islands. Some sandbars emerge from the sea, but only Trischen is high enough and safe enough from storm surges, to allow saltwater-loving vegetation to grow. Compared to the geologically similar East Frisian Islands of the southern Wadden Sea, Trischen is considerably smaller and younger. All attempts by human inhabitants to fortify the island have failed. With several large estuaries the salinity in the central Wadden Sea is lower than in the rest of the Wadden Sea and is subject to higher fluctuations.

=== Protection areas of the National Park ===
The national park divides into two zones that correspond to different levels of protection. Zone 1 has a size of 162.000 ha and covers a third of the whole national park. The zone consists of 12 bigger units which all contain marshland, intertidal estuarine mudflat, mixed sediment mudflat, sand flat, tidal creeks as well as deep and flat areas that are permanently under water (sublittoral). Additionally there are smaller units around sensible places like breeding areas of coastal birds, sandbars of seals, places where migratory birds moult or geomorphological meaningful areas with natural surface structure. Zone 1 is principally closed for the public. Exceptions are made for the mudflat areas directly bordering the coastline, some routes for guided mudflat hiking tours and fishery. South of the Hindenburgdamm, facing the landside of Sylt, a human use of the first zone is completely prohibited (Zero use zone). This part is 12.500 ha big, whereof 3500 ha are permanently covered with water.

Zone 2 forms a 'buffer' around the first zone, in which a sustainable use is possible. In protection zone 2 west of Sylt´s coast locates a protection area for small whales, e.g. the common porpoise, with a size of 124.000 ha. It is an important reproduction area of the porpoise, whose population declined about 90 per cent in the North Sea during the 20th century. Activities like swimming, sailing or traditional crab fishing are still allowed in the area, while international industry fishing, jet-skis, ship velocities over 12 knots, military activities and resource exploitation (sand, grit, gas, oil) should be prevented.

=== Land, sea and mudflats ===
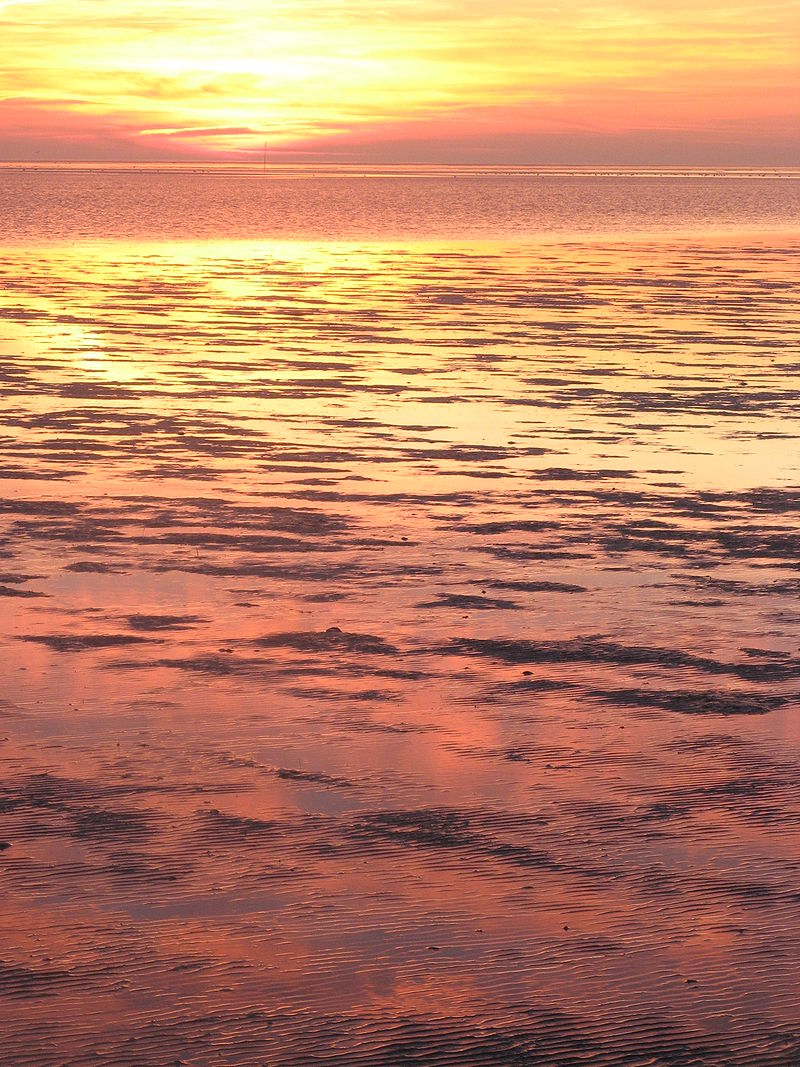
Sunset in the Wadden Sea

The North Sea coast is very flat; in places the ocean floor only descends a few centimetres per kilometre. Twice a day the high tide carries sand, clay and silt into the Wadden Sea. The tidal range in Schleswig-Holstein's part of the Wadden Sea accounts for between 1.5 m and 3.7 m, increasing from north to south. The lowest tidal ranges occur on Sylt's north coast, the highest in southern Dithmarschen. Everywhere in the Wadden Sea the amount of time the water needs to stream in is only 85% of the time it needs to run off again. Therefore the current of the water coming in, is much stronger and the low tide does not have the power to remove the sediments the high tide accumulated.

Over 2/3 of the national park are covered with water permanently (sublittoral), 30% of mudflat that is lying dry during low tide and gets flooded with water during high tide (eulittoral). The rest is land area that only gets flooded under certain conditions (supralittoral). The water areas contain the offshore part of the park as well as huge tidal currents like the Lister Tief, the Heverstrom, the Purrenstrom, the Wesselburener Loch or the Piep. Outside the mudflat area runs a constantly strong current from south to north, coming from the southern North Sea and going on to the Norwegian Trench. Owing to the river mouths of several big European waters (like the Rhine or Elbe), the current's salinity of 20–30 psu lies below that of the ocean, and above that of the river mouths.

Since inhabited regions are not part of the national park, the land areas are nearly completely covered with salt marshes and a small part contains sandbars and dunes. The salt marshes cover over 10,000 ha, of which 70% developed on land protected by breakwaters, 10% are situated on the downwind side of the islands and the remainder formed around the Hallig Islands. Between 1988 and 2001 the area of the salt marshes expanded about 700 ha. Widely natural and use-free salt marshes can be found around the islands and ashore around Schobüll and St. Peter-Ording.

The whole Wadden Sea is ruled by an Atlantic climate. Strong westerlies and the heat storage capacity are determining factors which often generate strong winds, but at the same time balance the temperatures. Thus occur cold summers (July: 14.5 °C) and mild winters (January: 1.8 °C).

== Flora and fauna ==
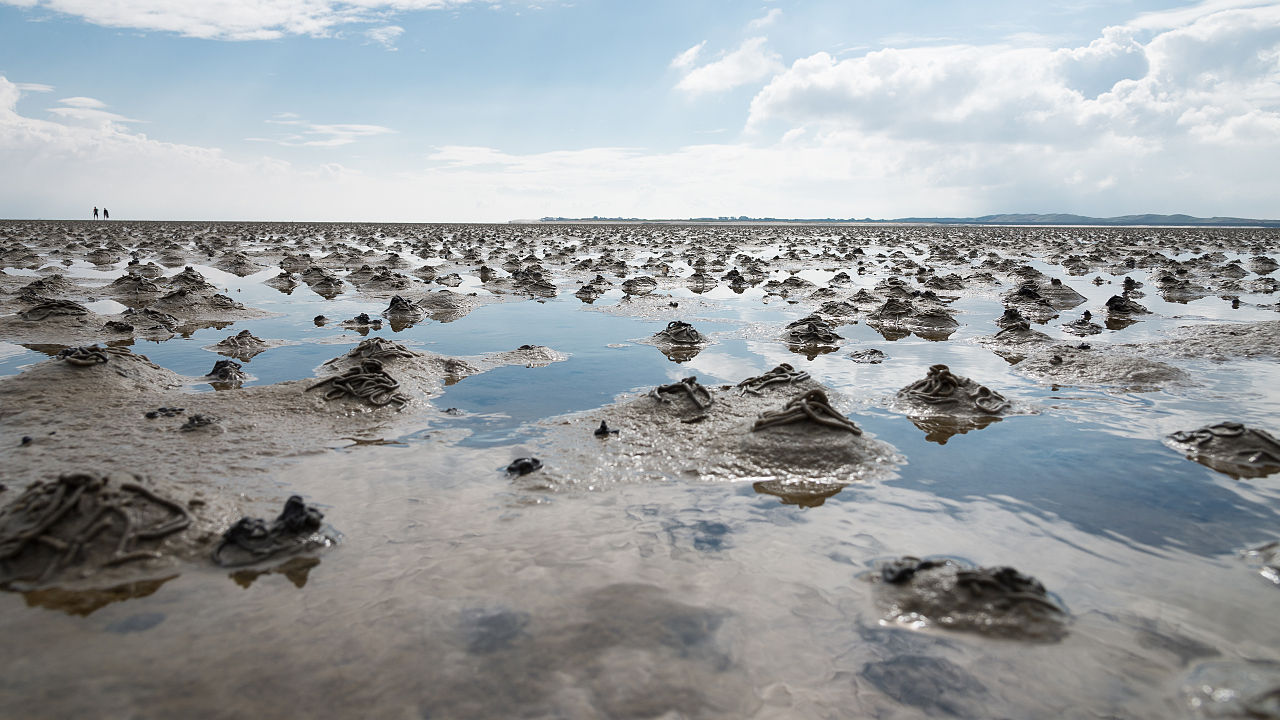
Rockworm piles in the Wadden Sea

Saltwater, tide and strong winds characterize the environment in the Wadden Sea area. Only extremely specialized organisms can cope with the conditions. Fishes, breeding birds and most of the marine mammals living in the Wadden Sea use it as nursery. Besides that, giant flocks of migratory birds visit the Wadden Sea regularly in spring and fall using it as a food source. In the Wadden Sea of Schleswig-Holstein you can find about 700 plant and 2500 animal species, of which 10% are endemic.

=== Plants ===
Eelgrass is the only flowering plant in the Wadden Sea which is capable of living under water. In 1930 most of the eelgrass in the Atlantic Ocean was killed by an epidemic. The eelgrass stocks haven't regenerated since. The plants are mainly located in the northern part of Schleswig-Holstein’s Wadden Sea and cover an area of 6000 ha. Compared to 705 ha in Lower Saxony and 130 ha in the Netherlands, it is quite large. Also in contrast to the worldwide trend of decreasing eelgrass stocks, the stocks in the Frisian Wadden Sea area are increasing. During the maximum spatial extent in August eelgrass covers up to 13% of the North Frisian Wadden Sea. Eelgrass areas provide habitats for marine organisms and are an important food source for barnacle geese (Branta leucopsis).

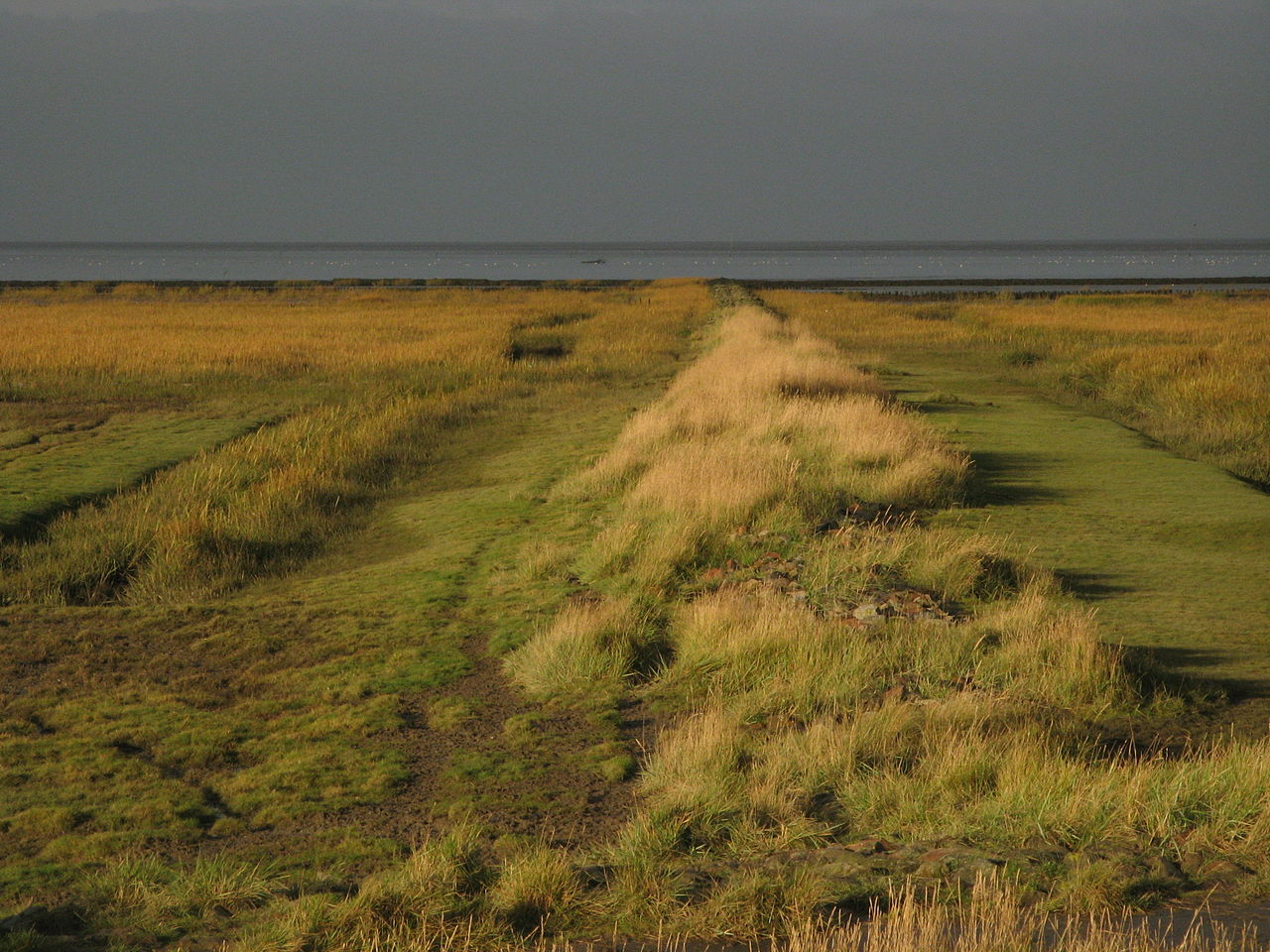
Salt marshes make up the biggest part of the National Park's vegetation.

Salt marshes are the dominant landscape in the transition zone between open sea and inland. They are regularly flooded between 10 and 250 times a year depending on the tidal range. Salt marshes build different zones relative to the local salinity. The lower marsh zone which is flooded the most has a higher salinity than the upper marsh zone which is less frequently flooded because of the higher elevation. In total about 50 species of flowering plants can be found in the local salt marshes. In low elevation areas plants like common salt marsh grass (Puccinellia maritima), sea-aster (Hordeum marinum), sea-blite (Sueda maritima) and sea-purslane (Halimione portulacoides) are characteristic. High elevation areas are a lot more diverse in plant species. Common plants are seaside centaury (Centaurium littorale), red eyebright (Odontites rubra), see plantain (Plantago maritima) and distant sedge (Carex distans).

In the dunes small amounts of plants can be found; due to the extreme conditions only some dune heaths grow there. The rain-laden dune valleys resemble the vegetation of a marsh, with plants like cotton grass (Eriophorum angustifolium), drosera or marsh gentian (Gentiana pneumonanthe).

=== Animals ===
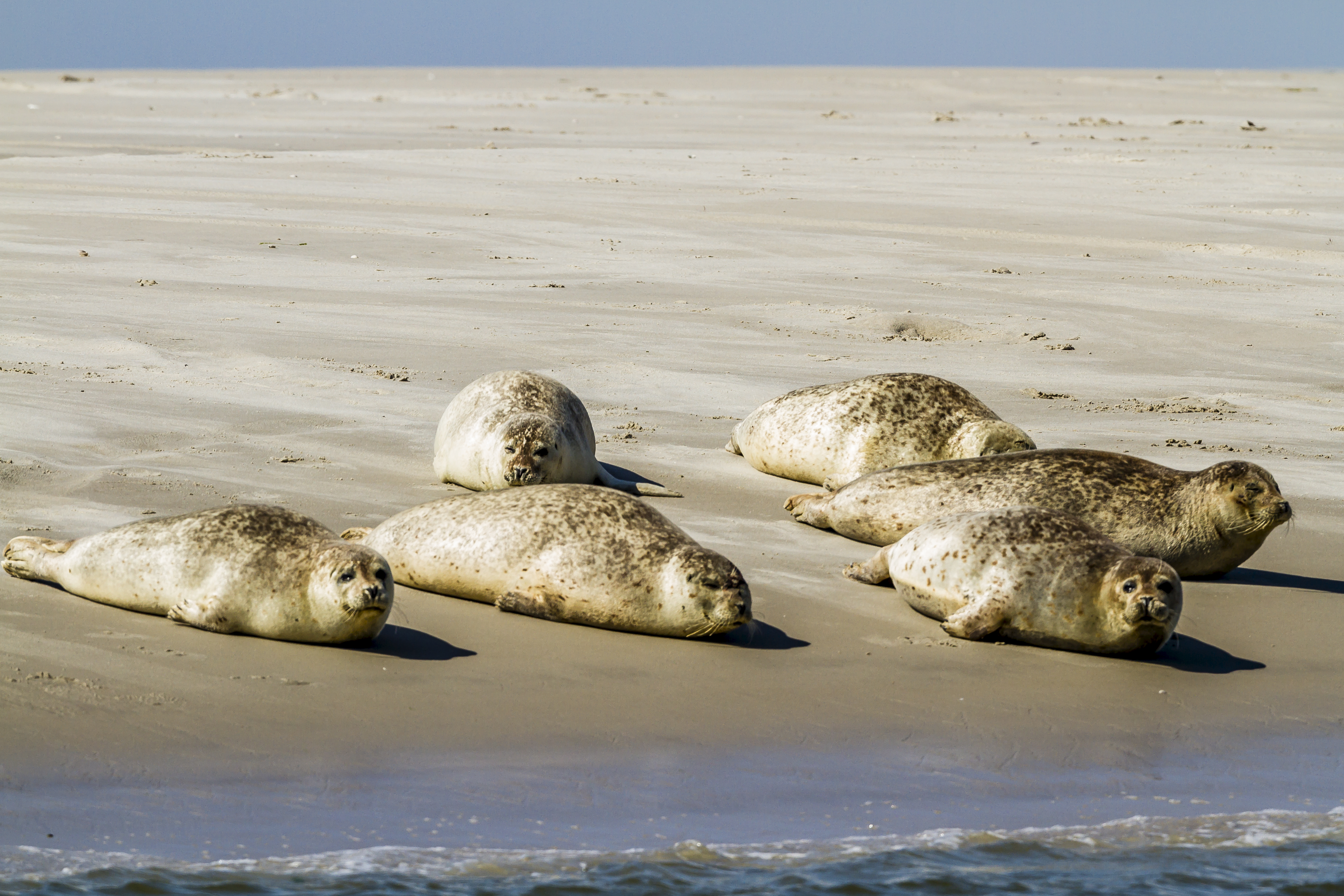
Seals use the Wadden Sea as resting and breeding place.

==== Mammals ====
A great number of harbour porpoises live in the national park. The Wadden Sea is also home to harbour seals and grey seals. According to the official counting of the National park Administration, about 13.000 harbour seals are living in the Wadden Sea of Schleswig-Holstein (2017). Nearly half of the seal population died during the "Seehundstaupe" epidemic in 1988 and 2002. The National Park Administration assumed that one third of the harbour seal population was swimming or hunting during the counting so the number had to be adjusted. The grey seal population consists of 140 animals and is mainly located on the "Jungnamensand" sand bar and the "Knobsand" sand bars near the island Amrum.

==== Insects ====
The Wadden Sea only has a few places where insects are found. Nearly all of the 2000 highly specialized species which are known to live in the national park can be found in salt marshes. Due to the difficult environmental conditions (for example salinity or frequent flooding), it is hard to survive for insects, especially in the larval state. The main survival strategy is hiding in the soil or inside plants. As nutrition they prefer parts of the plants that have already released the saltwater. Relatively well-known examples are the "Halligflieder-Spitzmaus-Rüsselkäfer" or the "Strandwegerichgallrüsselkäfer" (Mecinus collaris) that live in the particular plant. In contrast the magnificent salt beetle (Bledius spectabilis) digs a tube in the mudflat.

Sea lavender serves the caterpillar of the seldom seen Salzwiesen-Kleinspanner (Scopula emutaria) as nutrition. Its existence can only be proven in the coastal area of Sylt and Amrum.

==== Birds ====
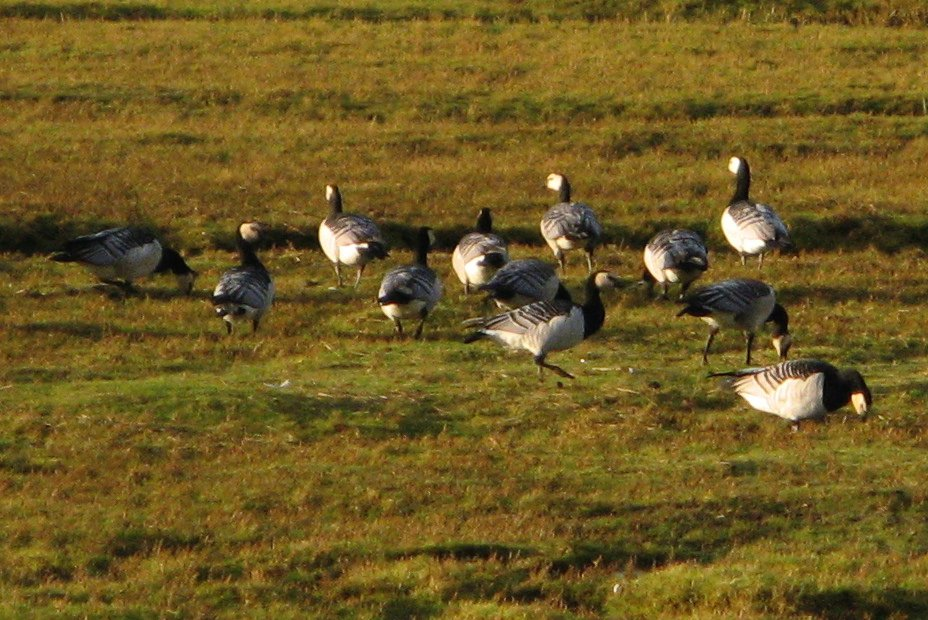
Barnacle geese

The avifauna of the national park is comparable with avifaunae of other Wadden Sea regions. With over 10 million birds in spring and autumn the trilateral Wadden Sea accommodates the most birds in Europe. The nutrition-rich area is visited by migratory birds regularly. Due to the ongoing changes in the Wadden Sea the effects of the national park on the avifauna are hard to quantify. From 1994 to 2004 only three bird species (European spoonbill, Great cormorant, common ringed plover) increased in number. In the same period, the stock of 18 other species shrank including barnacle goose, common greenshank, Eurasian curlew, black-headed gull, lesser black-backed gull, Eurasian oystercatcher, pied avocet and dark bellied brent goose.

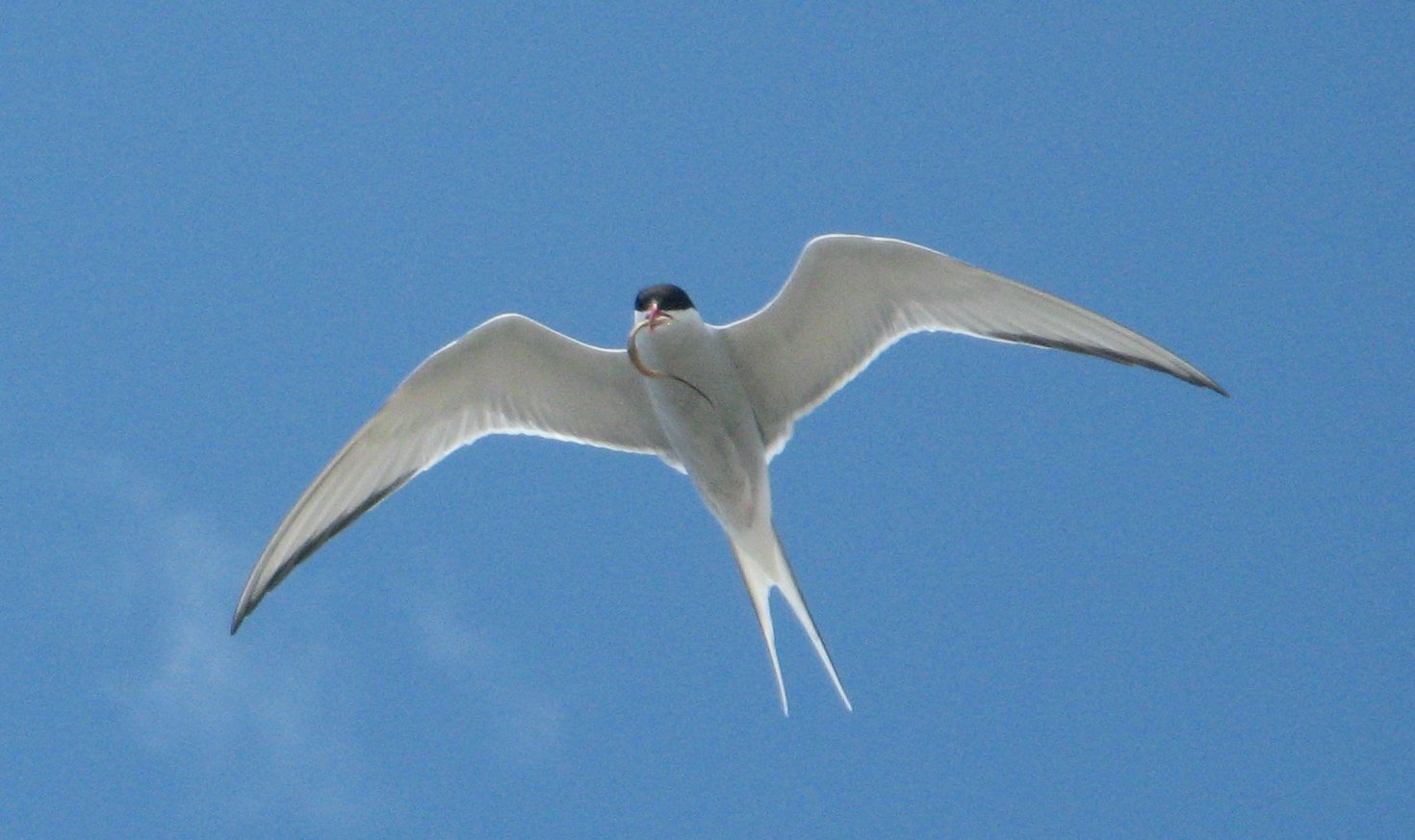
Arctic tern

The reason why the stocks are decreasing is unknown. It is presumed that trawling damages the food source of the birds permanently. Species which are mainly living inland seem to have advantage over species which mostly live in salt marshes. They prefer dyked areas, which are cut off from salt water intrusion (polders), so the fresh water environment is dominating. Examples for newly-dyked polders in Schleswig-Holstein are Beltringharder Koog, Hauke-Haien-Koog, Speicherkoog, Rickelsbüller Koog. Since 2000, breeding eagle pairs settled permanently in the Wadden Sea area.

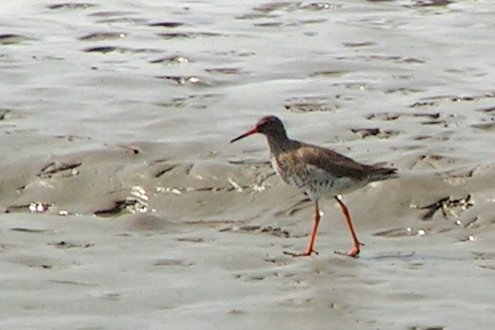
Redshank

The population of the northwest-European common shelduck, which numbers 180,000 birds, spends the time of moulting between July and September in the Wadden Sea, mainly around the protected island of Trischen. There gathers over 80% of the northwest-European population. This phenomenon of a "mass moulting" is unique in the world.

About 200,000 eider ducks spend their moulting time here; about 1000 eider duck couples use the mudflats of the North Sea as breeding area. Most can be found on the island of Amrum. Huge stocks of barnacle geese (about 60,000) or brant geese (about 84,000) exist solely on the islands and Halligen. It has been noted that the barnacle goose is steadily extending its stay in the Wadden Sea. Around the North Frisian Islands at water depths of 2–10 m the common scoter appears in internationally meaningful stocks.

==== Fishes, mussels and shellfish ====
The typical mussels of the Wadden Sea are the common cockle (Cerastoderma edule) and the blue mussel (Mytilus edulis). While the common cockle is omnipresent, wild growing blue mussels are less common than in the southern Wadden Sea. They suffer from the expansion of the Pacific oyster which benefit from the warmer winters. The sand gaper was probably introduced by the Vikings from America; the American piddock arrived at the end of the 19th century, while the appearance of the Atlantic jackknife clam in the Wadden Sea is known since 1976.

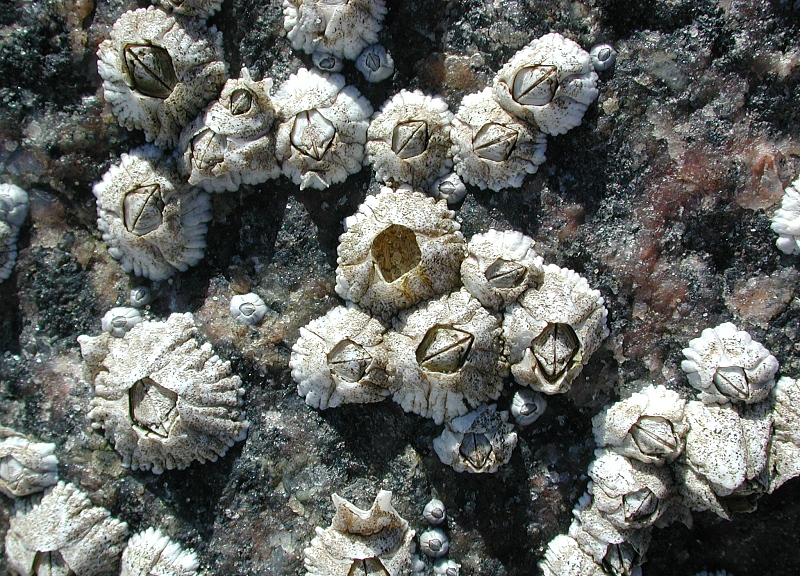
Barnacles

Of the shellfish, the common shore crab (Carcinus maenas) is of huge importance, because it devours 10% of the whole Wadden Sea´s biomass. Also, numerous brown shrimp and barnacles can be found. Besides the seal the lugworm is probably the most famous animal in the Wadden Sea.

Only some small fishes are completely domestic in the mudflat, e.g. eelpout (Zoarces viviparus), sand goby (Pomatoschistus minutus) and sea scorpion (Myoxocephalus scorpius). Many other species use the area rich in food and oxygen and protected from predatory fish as spawning grounds. Flatfish like plaice are important to name, but also the garfish (Belone belone) is active in the eastern part of the Atlantic.

== The National Park ==
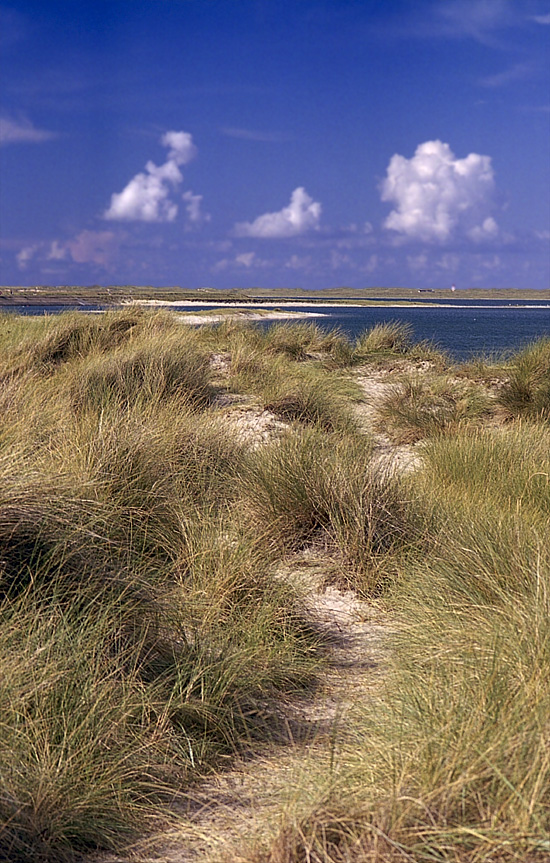
Sylt-Nord and Morsum-Kliff are the oldest conservation areas in Schleswig-Holstein. They have existed since 1923.

=== History ===
The protection of the Wadden Sea of Schleswig-Holstein is a target on nature conservation since the 20th century. In the 1920s, the first concerns were the protection of areas in the Wadden Sea e.g. "Sylt-Nord" and the Morsum cliff (Sylt). Since 1940, 11 conservation areas were established in North Frisia targeting mainly the protection of animal species, especially birds.

During the development of the conservation areas, protecting biotopes became more and more important. In the 1960s, plans were first made for conserving the entire area of the Wadden Sea. In 1963 the Wadden Sea Conservation Station demanded a "Großschutzgebiet Halligmeer" (protection of the area around the small undyked islands off the coast of Schleswig-Holstein). The local hunting association firstly proposed the term national park in relation to the Wadden Sea in 1972, two years after the establishment of the Bavarian Forest National Park. In 1973 the ministry of agriculture proposed a bill which was withdrawn the following year because of strong resistance by locals. In 1975, a first scientific conference about the conservation of the Wadden Sea and in 1978, a first trilateral intergovernmental conference with participants form Germany, Netherlands and Denmark took place. In 1982 a joint declaration on the protection of the Wadden Sea was signed in Den Haag by the three states. It was not until 1985 that the Wadden Sea was declared a national park due to political tensions within the local population which are caused by a strong traditional desire for freedom by Frisian people. In 1999, the Wadden Sea National Park was further extended, again accompanied by political protests. The distinction as a National Park led to protesters throwing eggs at the responsible minister and a shrimp boat demonstration in the Kieler Förde.

==== First National Park law ====
The former CDU government founded Schleswig-Holstein Wadden Sea National Park. It was the third national park in Germany after the Bavarian Forest National Park and the Berchtesgaden National Park. Finally in July 1985, the Landtag of Schleswig-Holstein adopted the national park law. The declared conservation area covered 272,000 ha, divided into three different zones of protection. The National Park begins 150 m from the coastline with a seaward extent from 5 to 10 m water depth. On 1 October 1985, the national park law passed.

In 1986, the Lower Saxony, and in 1990 the Hamburg Wadden Sea National Park were founded. The Wadden Sea areas in the Netherlands and in Denmark are protected by other conservation measures. The Danish Wadden Sea was declared a national park in 2010.

The national park law says:

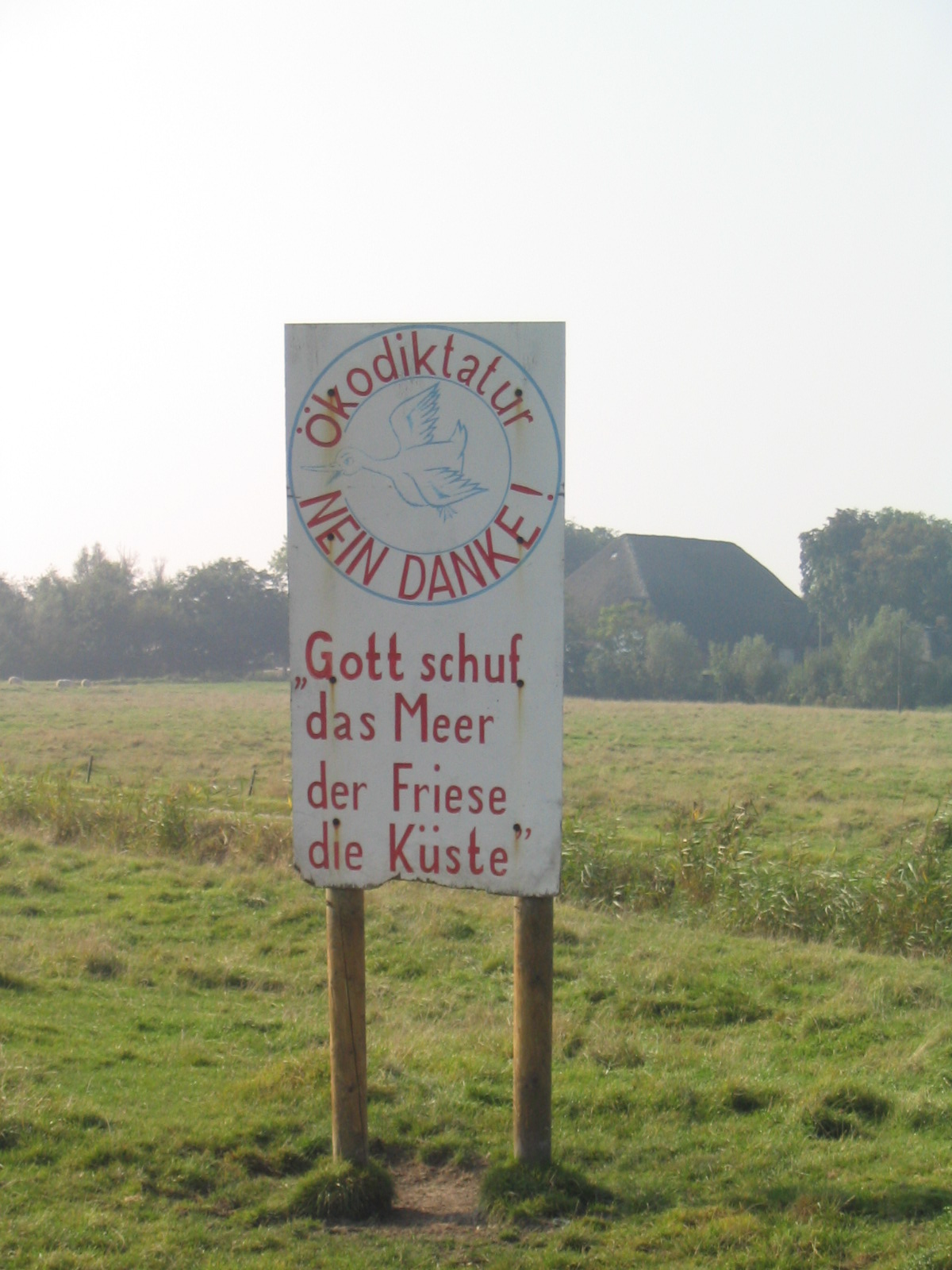
Old signs of protest against the National Park

„Die Errichtung des Nationalparks dient dem Schutz des schleswig-holsteinischen Wattenmeeres und der Bewahrung seiner besonderen Eigenart, Schönheit und Ursprünglichkeit. Seine artenreiche Pflanzen- und Tierwelt ist zu erhalten und der möglichst ungestörte Ablauf der Naturvorgänge zu sichern. Jegliche Nutzungsinteressen sind mit dem Schutzzweck im Allgemeinen und im Einzelfall gerecht abzuwägen.“

The main point of the law is that the formation of the national park should protect the animals and plants within it, but also the natural processes taking place there. Any utilization of the area is to be weighed against the aim of nature conservation.

Local people who were living near the coast and were affected by the national park law felt overlooked by the government. In their mind the Wadden Sea was formed by their ancestors over centuries which somehow led to an attitude of desiring unconditional freedom and autonomy. The National Park Wadden Sea being governed by the "far away city" Kiel felt like heteronomy by politicians who have no relation to local agriculture, fisheries and had never experienced the danger of storm surges.

On the other hand, the political opposition and local nature conservation organizations were skeptical as well. They thought that the restrictions and conservation measures coming with the national park law were insufficient. They also feared the increasing masses of tourists which the distinctive national park could incur.

==== Ecosystem synthesis report, discussion and protests ====
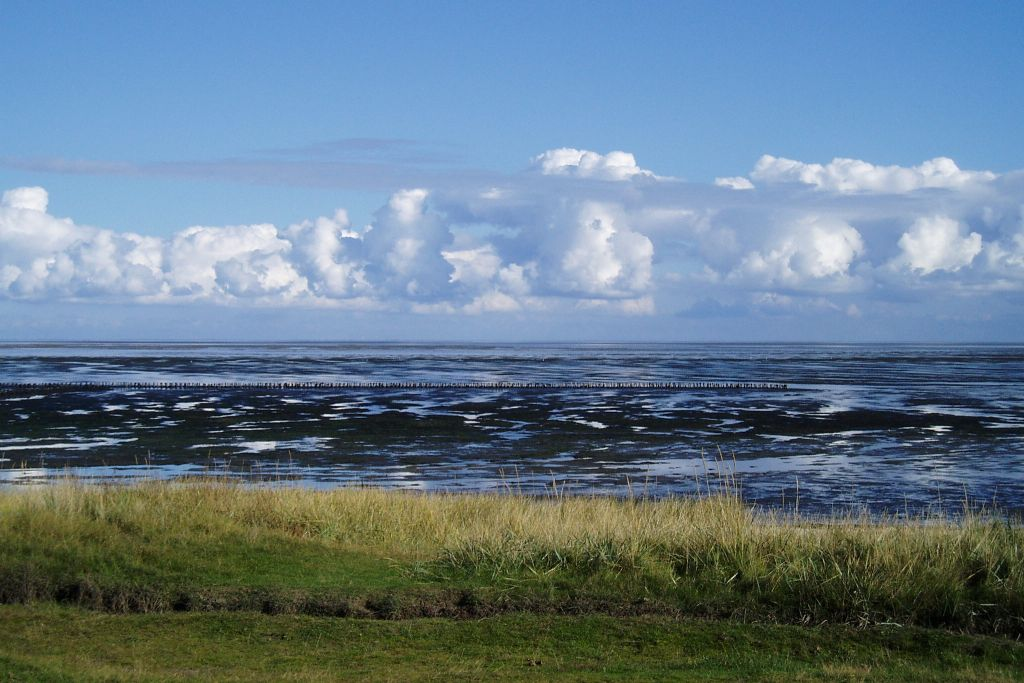
Environmentalists tried to establish a conservation zone in the Wadden Sea east of Keitum/Sylt, but without success.

The basis of the second national park law was the Ecosystem synthesis report, published in 1996. Within 800 pages an interdisciplinary team of scientists summarized suggestions for changes in the existing National Park law based on results of seven years of extensive monitoring in the national park. The synthesis report which was commissioned by the Environment Secretary Berndt Heydemann was discussed in over 200 local assemblies and 15 meetings of national park boards of trustees. In 1998, the cabinet of Schleswig-Holstein began to discuss proposals for the second national park law. In December 1999, it became effective.

The synthesis report provided suggestions for expanding the area classified as national park up to 349,000 ha compared to the original 237,000 ha. It also proposed to declare the "Lister Tief" and the "Wesselburener Loch" a zero use zone. Crafters in the Dithmarscher Wadden Sea during the moult of common shelducks from July to September were prohibited.

The suggestions of the synthesis report caused a great wave of political responses. Especially, North Frisian people led by the head of district administrator Olaf Bastian (CDU) were dedicated enemies of an expanding national park. Not only North Frisian people protested against the synthesis report respectively the second National Park Law but other protest movements developed among the people living at the west coast too. In Büsum 1000 people, including many local shepherds working at the dykes and shrimp fishermen, protested because they felt limited in their freedom and negatively affected in their income. On 26 August 1999, 143 shrimp fishermen travelled with their boats through the Kiel Canal to the city of Kiel to protest against the second national park law during its declaration in front of the Schleswig-Holstein Landtag. During an event in Tönning, locals threw eggs at the Secretary of environment, Rainder Steenblock. In November 1999, one month before the second national park law became effective, 160 fires were lit along the west coast of Schleswig-Holstein as a warning act.

The protests were mainly about the number and size of the zero use zones in which fishing wouldn't be allowed, and about the landside border of the park. It should, instead of the 150 m band, now border the outer edge of the dykes which includes a lot of salt marshes and especially swimming places.

==== Second national park law ====
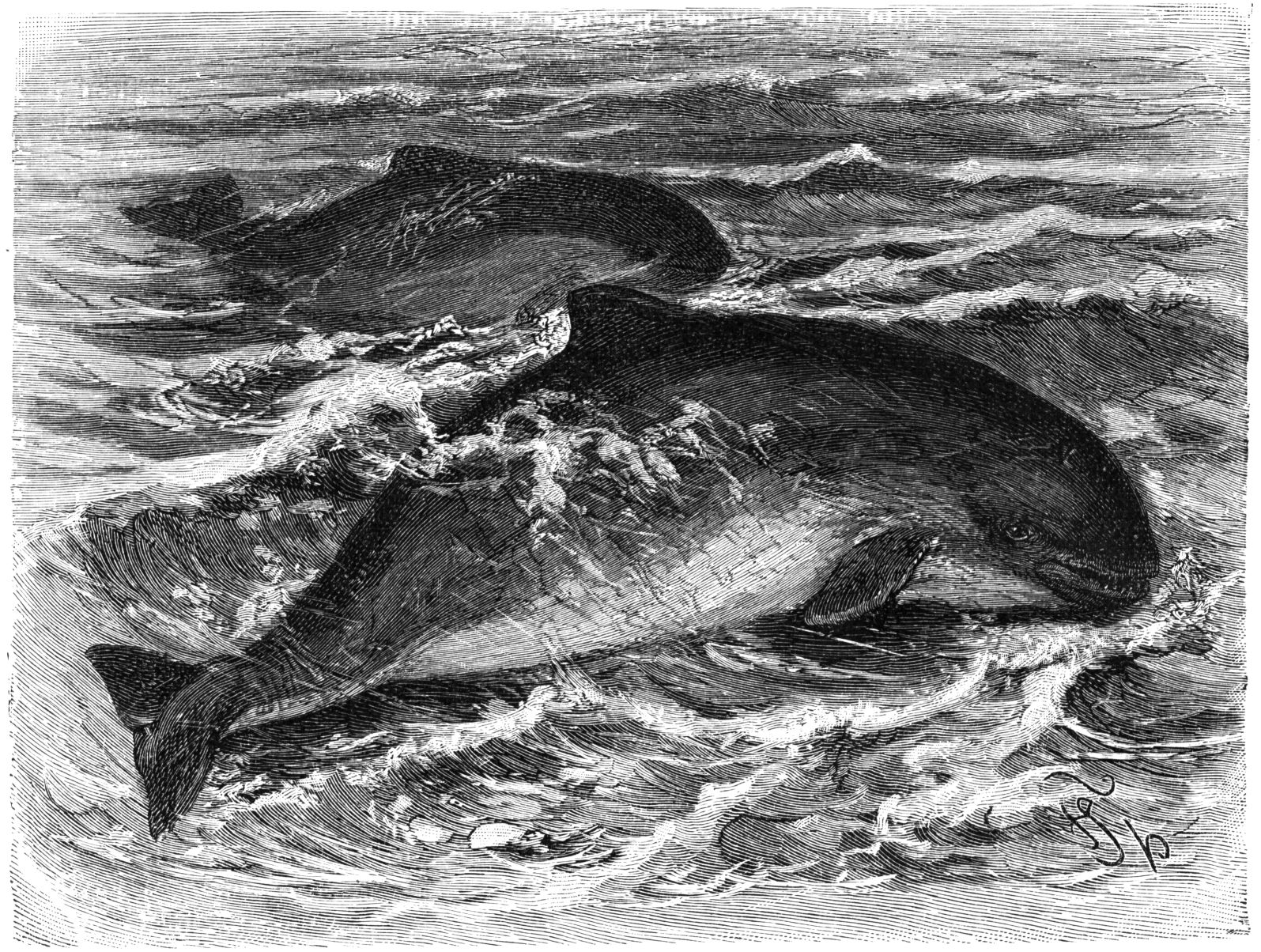
Amongst others the second National Park law established a whale sanctuary for the protection of the common porpoise.

On 17 December 1999, the Landtag of Schleswig-Holstein changed the national park law according to the proposals of the synthesis report. The protective purpose of the National Park was changed from "möglichst ungestörten Ablauf der Naturvorgänge" (that is, an undisturbed ongoing of natural processes) to „conserved as a habitat for the plant and animal species that occur in it naturally as well as for the relationships occurring between such species and their habitats". Nevertheless, coastal protection still has a higher priority than nature conservation. Additionally, it is written that the restriction of the national park shouldn’t restrain the locals in their interests and habits and that the national park should work to affect the tourism in the North Sea region positively.

The law expanded the national park area only seawards. The coastal border stayed the same, 150 m from the dyke. A zero use zone was created south of the Hindenburgdamm instead of the originally proposed zero use zones "Lister Tief" and "Wesselburener Loch", which would have been ecologically more valuable. Additionally, a whale sanctuary was established and hunting was prohibited completely, which had much effect on shellfisheries. The law also simplified the conservation zone system. Conservation zone 3 was made obsolete while conservation zone 1 was expanded drastically, especially in areas of tidal inlets. Pleasure crafters and fishermen agreed upon avoiding moulting areas of barnacle geese during moult time. The law also proposed speed limitations for ships and boats in the national park area.

To control non-official criticism and promote cooperation between locals and the National Park Administration the law created countless platforms for task forces and projects.

=== Administration ===
The National Park Administration is the nature conservation authority for Schleswig-Holstein Wadden Sea National Park functioning as a higher and lower conservation authority. The administration office is located in Tönning. According to the second national park law Article 7 the National Park Administration is responsible for (1.) Informing the public about the national park, conducting educational activities and controlling movements of visitors, as well as for (2.) Carrying out and coordinating ecological monitoring, and providing the necessary relevant scientific basis for planning as well as for (3.) Regulating support provided by nature conservation associations within the meaning of Article 21 d of the state nature conservation act (Landesnaturschutzgesetz) for the national park.

Until 2007 the Wadden Sea National Park was administrated by the National Park State Office (Landesamt) which was directly assigned to the Ministry of Nature, Environment and Regional Development (Ministerium für Natur, Umwelt und Landesentwicklung). Since 1 January 2008 the National Park Administration is integrated in the newly founded Agency of Coastal Defence, National Park and Marine Conservation of Schleswig-Holstein as Department 3: National Park and Marine Conservation. The main reason to unite coastal defence and nature conservation in one agency is to provide a better coordination for overlapping responsibilities of these two departments. Head of Department 3: National Park and Marine Conservation is Dr. Detlef Hansen.

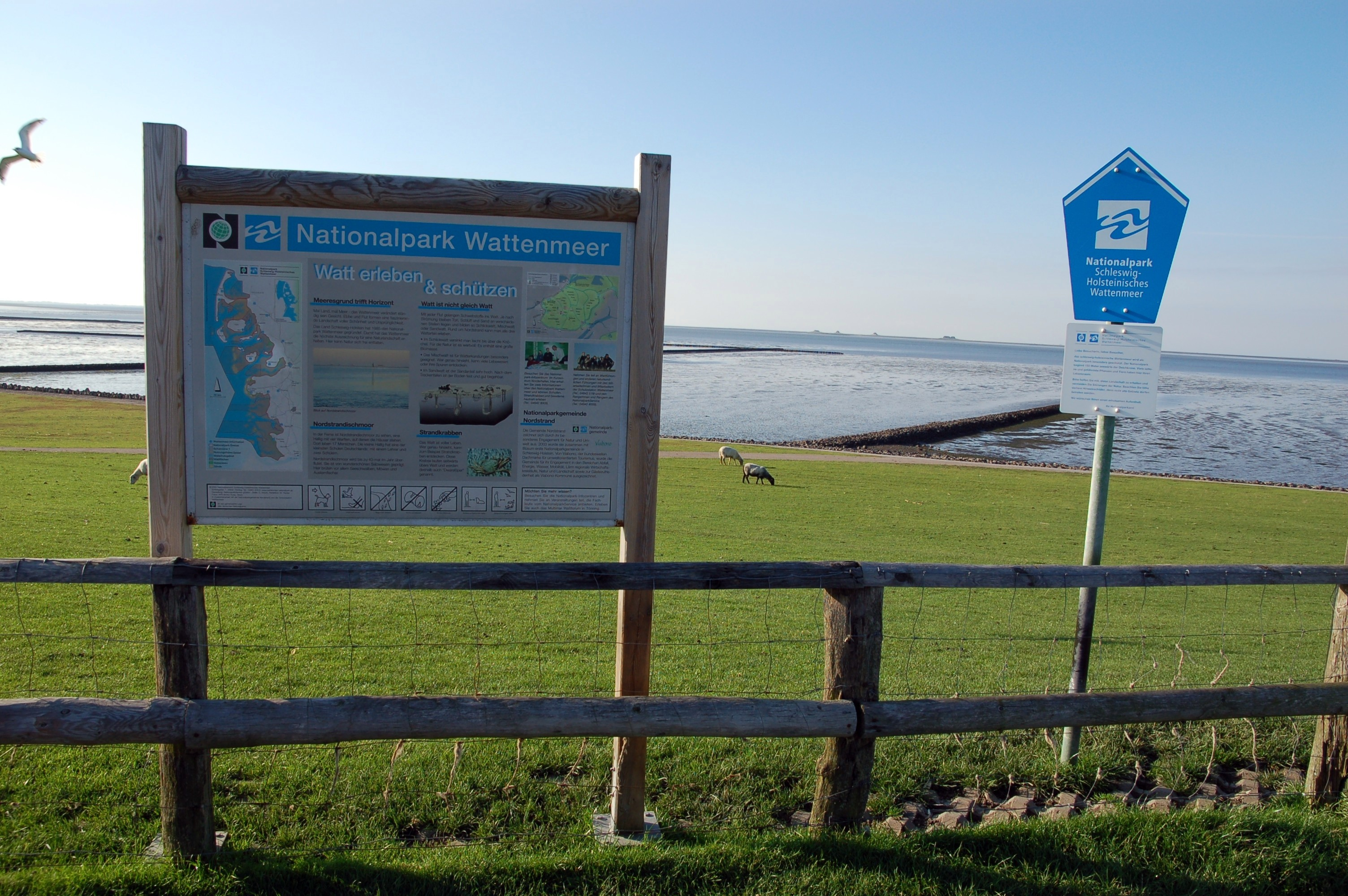
A part of the National Park administration's work is to inform the public.

Although the national park only covers the area of Dithmarschen and North Frisia and borders 69 local communities the state administration of Schleswig-Holstein is responsible for the national park. The state administration justifies its responsibility with high efficiency, standardised administration processes and the minimisation of special local interests. Besides that the biggest part of the national park area is classified as unincorporated area. The local communities have no right for administration in these areas. The administrative districts North Frisia and Dithmarschen and the local communities are members of the boards of trustees which are instruments to pool statements and influence on the national park.

99.9% of the national park area is public property. 99% of that is property of the German Federal Republic the rest belongs to the state of Schleswig-Holstein.[40]

The National Park Administration employs 85 people, to some extent in part-time jobs. It has a budget of seven million euros per year. With integrating the National Park administration in the Agency for Coastal Defence, National Park and Marine Conservation the "Nationalpark Service" got integrated in the National Park administration, so only one administration office is in charge of every area of responsibility concerning the National Park.

The National Park Administration tries to solve conflicts and work more efficient by making agreements with user groups to manage the details of the Park´s utilization. They negotiate treaties with fishermen, the guides for mudflat tours, the operators of excursion boats, but as well with communities like Sankt Peter-Ording, Westerhever or the Hamburger Hallig.

=== Other conservation measures ===
Since 1987 the governments of Denmark, Netherlands and Germany run the Common Wadden Sea Secretariat (CWSS) to provide better coordination of conservation measures. The secretariat is located in Wilhelmshaven. Since 1990 the area of the national park and five Hallig islands additionally own the conservation status of a Biosphere reserve. The waterways in this area are assigned to federal law. The latest act got passed in 1997 and determines the speed limitations and temporal closure of the waterways.

Internationally speaking the Wadden Sea of Schleswig-Holstein is subject to the Ramsar-Convention on Wetlands of International Importance. Since 2002 the area is also listed as a Particularly Sensitive Sea Area (PSSA). Additionally the national park is subject to a trilateral convention for protecting grey seals, harbour seals and Cetaceans called ‘Agreement on the Conservation of Small Cetaceans of the Baltic, North East Atlantic, Irish and North Seas’ as well as to the Agreement on the Conservation of African-Eurasian migratory water birds. The area is designated for the purpose of the Bird directive of the European Union (79/409/EWG) as well as for the purpose of the Habitats Directive and therefore a part of the European Natura 2000 nature protection network. As a part of the Marine Strategy Framework Directive the ecological status of the Wadden Sea has to be protected and improved. In the purpose of the Waterframework directive the national park is partly assigned to the Flussgebietseinheit (FGE) Eider, a so called "unit of the river basin Eider", and partly to the FGE Elbe. Harbour seals are protected in the Wadden Sea by the ‘Agreement on the Conservation of Seals in the Wadden Sea’. The 26 July 2009 the Wadden Sea of Schleswig-Holstein received the Status of UNESCO World Heritage together with the Wadden Sea of Lower Saxony and the Netherlands. The adjacent Wadden Sea of Hamburg received the Status in 2011, the National Park Vadehavet in Denmark in 2014.

== Human utilisation of the National Park ==
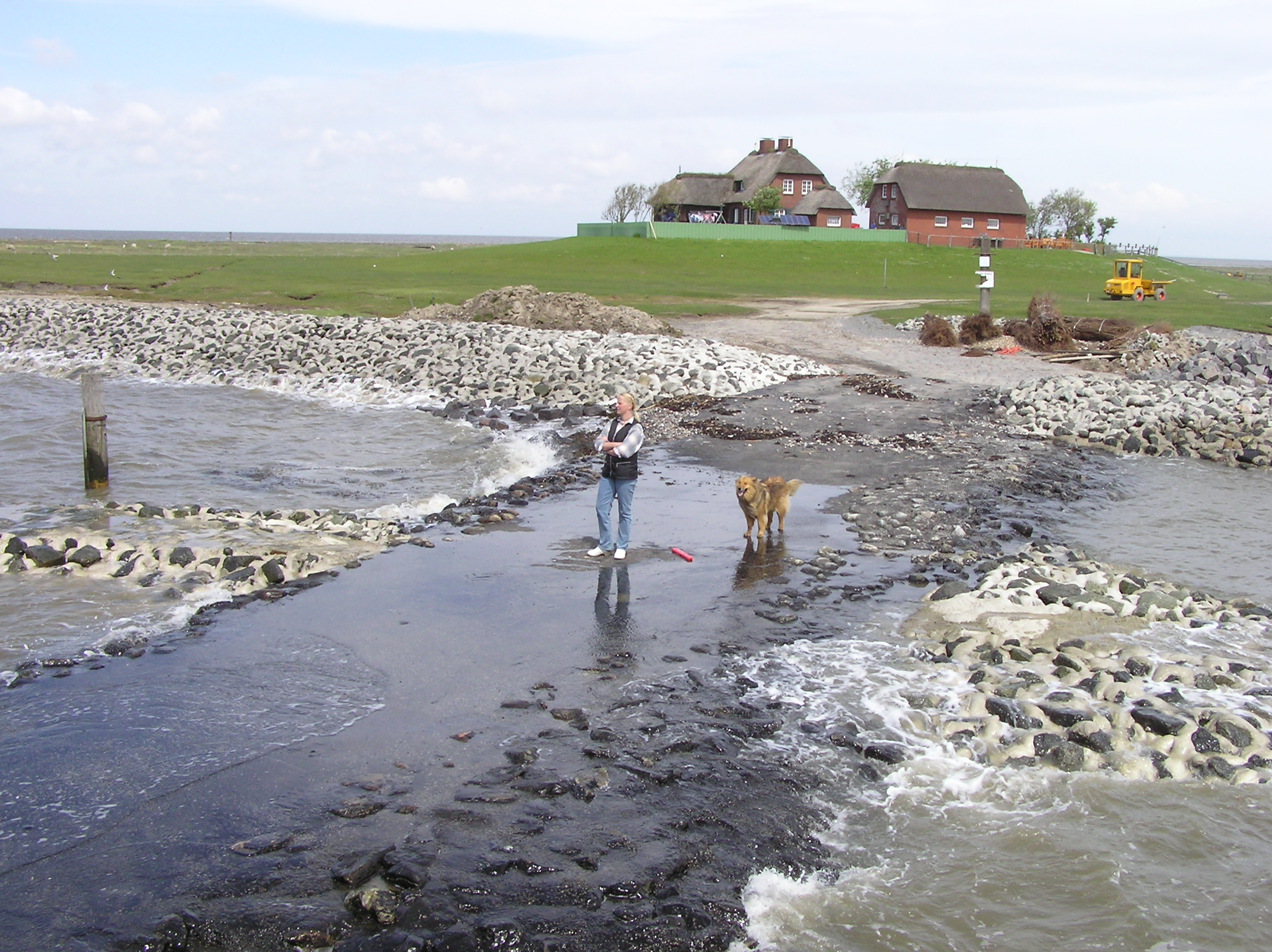
Two people are living on the Hallig Südfall during summer. Only five people are living inside the National Park, but the bordering communities contain 290.000 inhabitants. Additionally there are about 15 million tourists visiting the National Park every year.

The national park has 70 neighbouring communities in Schleswig-Holstein with 290.000 people living there. Additionally approximately 15 Million people visit the national park every year. The area of the Wadden Sea National Park is harnessed by tourism, fishery, oil production, coastal defence, grazing, maritime traffic and air traffic, withdrawal of gravel and sand, mussel cultivation and sometimes used for military weapon testing. Most of the utilisation is located directly near or at the coast, so the seaward area is more or less unaffected by human influences. Since the amendment of the second national park law in 1999 mainly voluntary agreements coordinate the limitation in human utilisation of the Wadden Sea. The consideration of traditional usages highly increased the approval of the national park by locals. Since 1987 utilisations, which hardly affect the ecosystem Wadden Sea at all, are allowed again by law. Such utilisations are e.g. collecting small amounts of plants for science or education.

=== Approval of the Wadden Sea National Park by locals and tourists ===
The National Park Administration commissions a monitoring program called "SÖM Watt" (Sozio-ökonomisches Monitoring) regularly. In the SÖM Watt report, data about the regional economy, the demographic developments, opinions and wishes of the local population are gathered and analysed. The results of the monitoring program shows that tourists are at least as well informed about the national park as locals. In a representative survey all over Germany the Wadden Sea National Park was placed second in terms of publicity, right behind the Bavarian Forest National Park, which was the first place. Despite being famous in the public awareness, only a few people distinguish (without help) between Schleswig-Holstein Wadden Sea National Park, Hamburg Wadden Sea National Park and Lower Saxony Wadden Sea National Park.

Besides being highly approved by tourists, the surveys suggest that locals have high rates of consent for the Wadden Sea National Park as well. According to the SÖM report 2017 about 85% of the population of Dithmarschen and North Frisia would vote for a continuation of the national park. Since 2009 the approval rates haven’t gone below 80%. 10% of the samples would vote for a continuation under certain circumstances. Only 2% would vote against a continuation of the Wadden Sea National Park. Locals, who would have voted against the national park, fear further limitations for example in fishery, aquatic sports and accessibility of the conservation area. However most of the samples show comprehension for specific conservation measures. In the survey of the SÖM report 2014 36% of locals said they are proud to have the Wadden Sea National Park. Additionally 52% think the existence of the national park is important. Women and young adults evaluate it more positively than men and elder persons.

It is hard to quantify the effects of the communication and education efforts of the National Park Administration with the locals. The administration has trouble in limiting the agriculture in the national park area, mainly because there hasn't been much agriculture in the first place before the Wadden Sea National Park was founded. Also, even 32 years after the creation of the national park, only 14% of the local people actually know that the Wadden Sea area which they are living adjacent to has the conservation status of a national park. The public awareness of the Wadden Sea being a biosphere reserve is < 1%.

=== Coastal defence ===
Coastal defence has a higher priority than nature conservation measurements, even in the national park area. Along the North Sea coast new dikes are being built and old dikes will be amplified according to the sea level rise. In some areas, e.g. at the west coast of Sylt eroded beach material is replaced through beach nourishment. But compared to other marine national parks coastal defence has always been a part of the Wadden Sea. The Wadden Sea wouldn't be the same today if not for coastal protection over centuries. For example drainage channels were dug in the Dark Age in salt marsh areas. Even today the channels change the originally amphibious character of the biotope.

In the past land reclamation was the number one priority for the people during the first settlements. Nowadays only small areas of land reclamation are planned (due to nature conservation) mainly for increasing the stability in foreshore areas for better flood protection.

=== Tourism ===
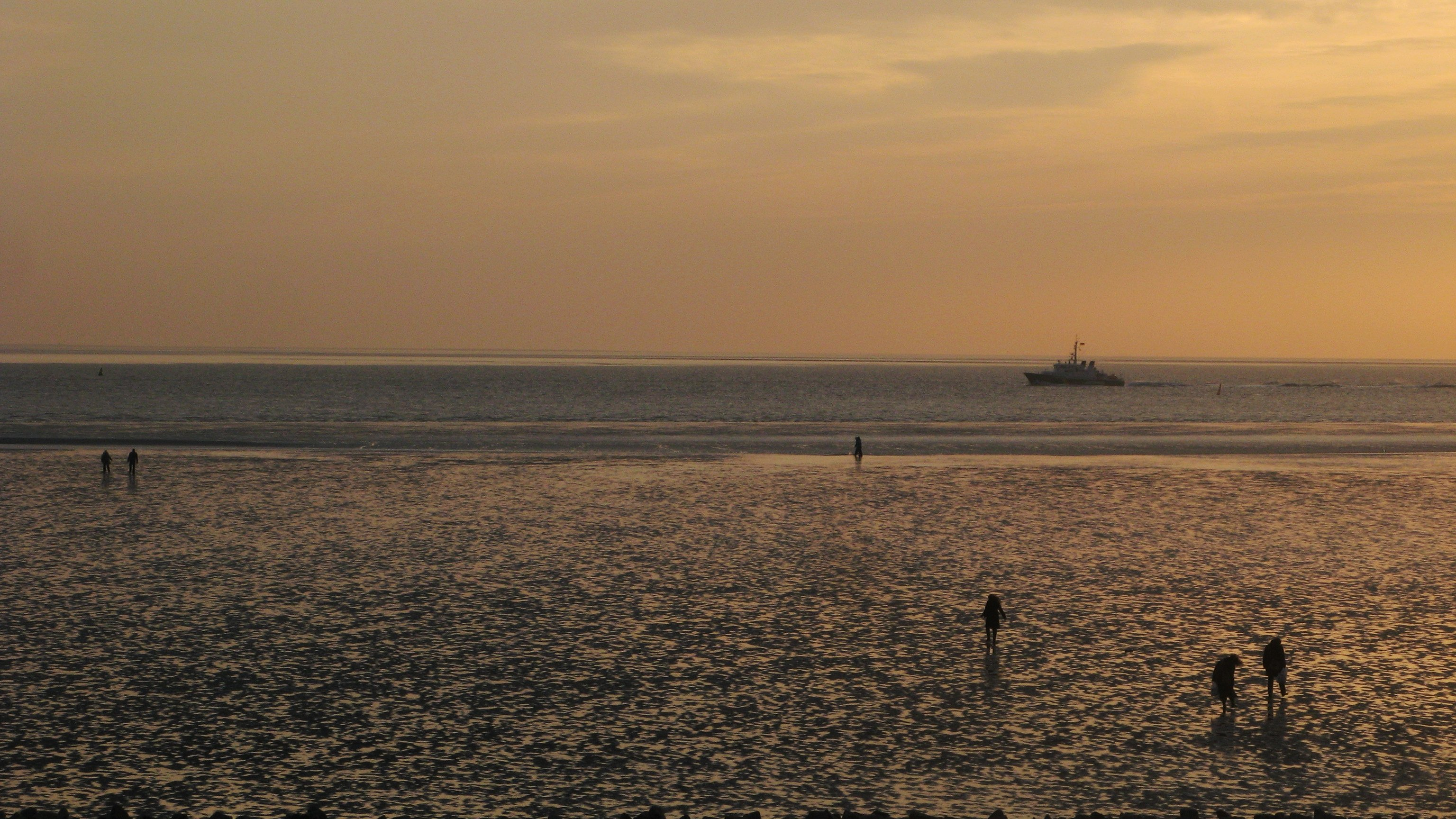
During a mudflat hiking tour visitors can discover the National Park.

The national park law says that nature conservation in the national park area shall support sustainable development of living and working conditions for locals. The goal is reached by positive backlash on tourism and reputation of the region. The location of the Wadden Sea National Park is a traditionally popular destination for German tourists. The official statistics show that 1.5 million holidaymakers generate 8.4 million overnight stays in the adjacent coastal area, islands and Hallig islands. One can assume that unofficial numbers are much higher because the official statistics don’t include private renting with less than 10 beds to sleep in, long-time camping, and staying overnight in houses / flats of relatives or friends. Another number which is hard to quantify are the daily visitors. To determine a total number of tourists the researchers combine official counting with other representative surveys with topics related to tourism in the North Sea region. Over all 18.7 million overnight stays are recorded as well as 12.8 million daily visitors. Approximately 9.000 people in the North Sea region are working in the tourist sector.

==== North Sea tourism in the Wadden Sea National Park area ====
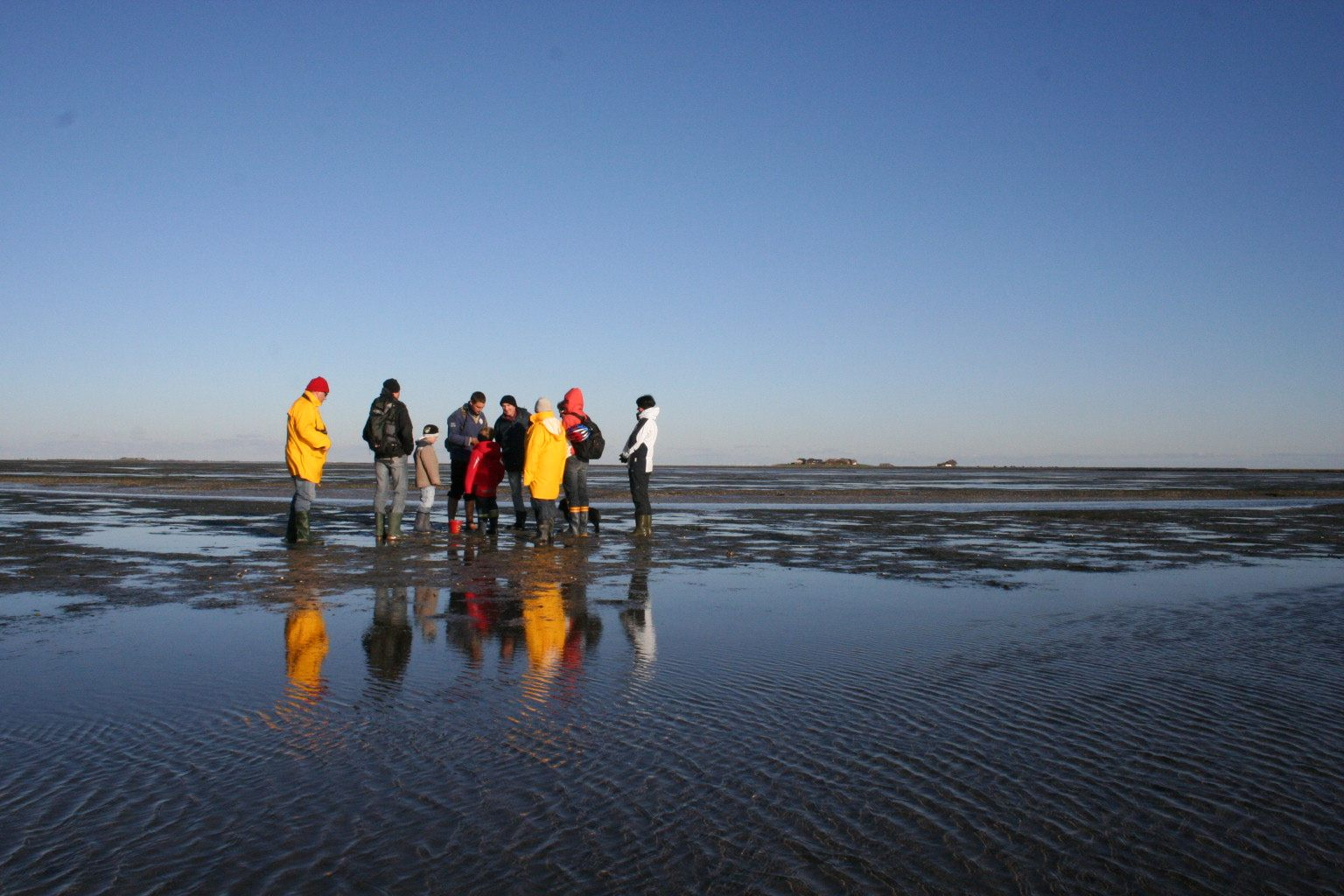
Mudflat excursion around Langeness with the Wadden Sea Conservation Station

The surveillance of the national park area is hard to manage for the National Park Administration. The number of tourists is too big; the area of the national park too large and the number of employees responsible for supervising tourists is too low. Additionally tourists do not have a few main entrances as in other German national parks, but the entrances to the Wadden Sea National Park are large in number through the dike areas. The National Park Administration cooperates with local communities and nature conservation organisations to close the surveillance gap.

Most of the time tourists who are visiting the national park stay out of the park itself. Normally the groups of tourists entering the national park are guided walking tours in the mudflat areas. The number of private walking tours is unknown. On the other hand the number of guided walking tours reached a maximum of 5.900 tours with a total of 149.000 participants attending in 2016, a number which has not been reached since 1999. Around 2/3 of the tours are guided and organised by members of the Wadden Sea Conservation Station. The remainder are guided by professional mudflat guides.

==== National Park tourism ====
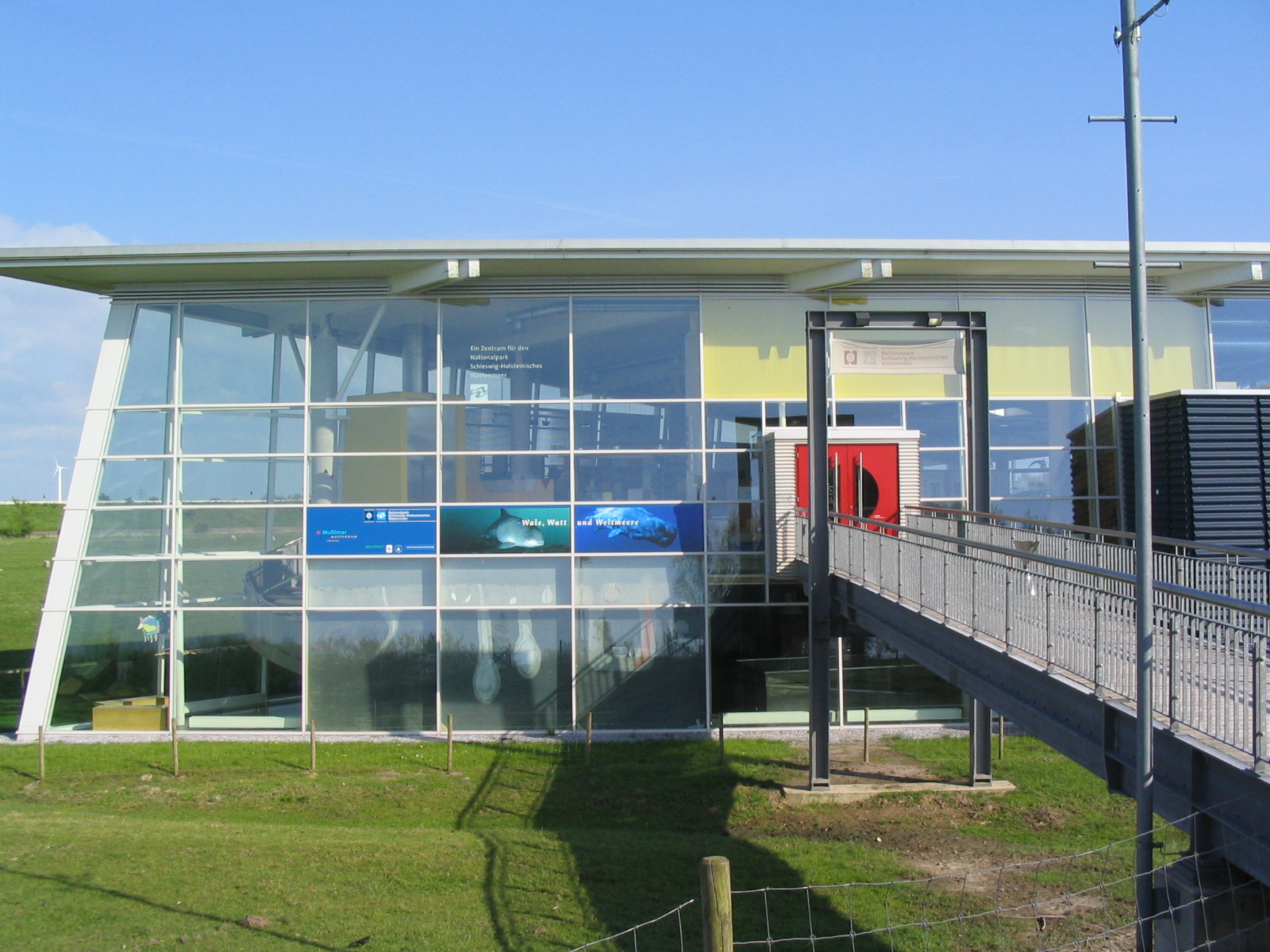
Multimar Wattforum is the most important information center of the National Park with about 200.000 visitors per year.

It is unknown to which degree the status of the national park increased the number of tourists in the North Sea region. Compared to administrative districts which are not located adjacent to the national park region, the increasing rate of tourists in administrative districts adjacent to the Wadden Sea National Park is not significantly higher.

However in 2014 17% of the people making a vacation in the North Sea area decided to go there because of the national park, suggests the SÖM report. These tourists generate a net product of 89 Million euros which is the income equivalent of 4741 people. As a part of the INTERREG IV B-project PROWAD another survey was made asking people to which degree the status of a national park influenced their decision during vacation planning to travel to the North Sea region. About 44% answered that they think the conservation of the Wadden Sea was a "very important" or an "important" factor for choosing their vacation destination.

The National Park Administration is responsible for public relation (PR) topics of the national park. A part of the PR program is their visitor information system. It consists of pavilions, information boards, maps, signs and guides. Meanwhile approximately 750 items are located in 250 places all over the coast of Schleswig-Holstein. Since 1999 the National Park Administration operates a main information centre in the town of Tönning called ‘Multimar Wattforum’. Besides that other bigger information centers are located in Wyk on Föhr Island and Husum (Nationalparkhaus) whereas 30 smaller information centers of the national park can be found all around the coast. The smaller information centers are operated by nature conservation associations or local communities. Other tourist attractions which also provide information about the national park and the World Heritage status are the "Seehundstation Friedrichskoog" and the "Erlebniszentrum Naturgewalten List" (Sylt).

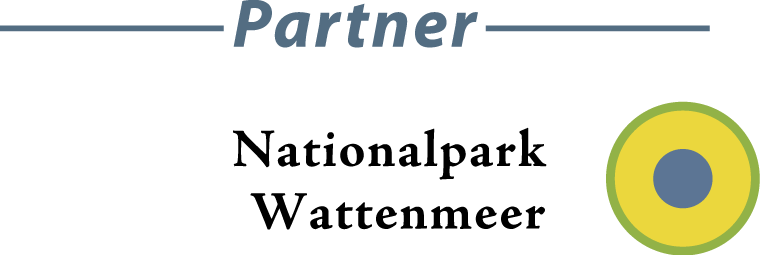
The National Park Partner Programme was initiated of the National Park Administration in 2003.

==== National Park partner initiative of the Wadden Sea National Park ====
The National Park Partner Project was founded in 2003 by the National Park Administration. Since then local touristic businesses can apply for a National Park Partnership. The idea behind the project is that tourists who plan a vacation in the North Sea region get a package made of quality service, practised "regionality" and ecological awareness. They also support sustainable touristic development in the National Park region. The project promotes cooperation between local communities, nature conservation associations and the National Park Administration. The central panel of the National Park Partner Project is the "Vergaberat" deciding over which applicant gets accepted and may enter the National Park Partner Network. The "Vergaberat" consists of the representatives from the Island and Hallig Island conference (Insel- und Halligkonferenz), nature conservation associations, National Park Partners, the Nordsee-Tourismus-Service GmbH and the National Park Administration. The head of the "Vergaberat" is Anja Szczesinski (World Wide Fund for Nature), the chief executive is Matthias Kundy (National Park Administration). Companies and businesses who want to apply for a National Park Partnership have to fulfil a catalogue of criteria in the fields of identification with the idea of a national park, ecological awareness and service quality. Currently over 170 partners are part of the network. The partners are categorised for example in apartments, hotels, professional mud flat guides, shipping companies or museum. The National Park Partnership is fee-based.

At the moment there are 27 "Nationale Naturlandschaften" (German national nature reserves) partner initiatives with over 1000 partnerships. They organise themselves in a committee of the Europarc Deutschland e.V. For having a comprehensive quality standard the committee developed a harmonised catalogue of criteria for National Park Partners.

=== Fishery, hunting and agriculture ===
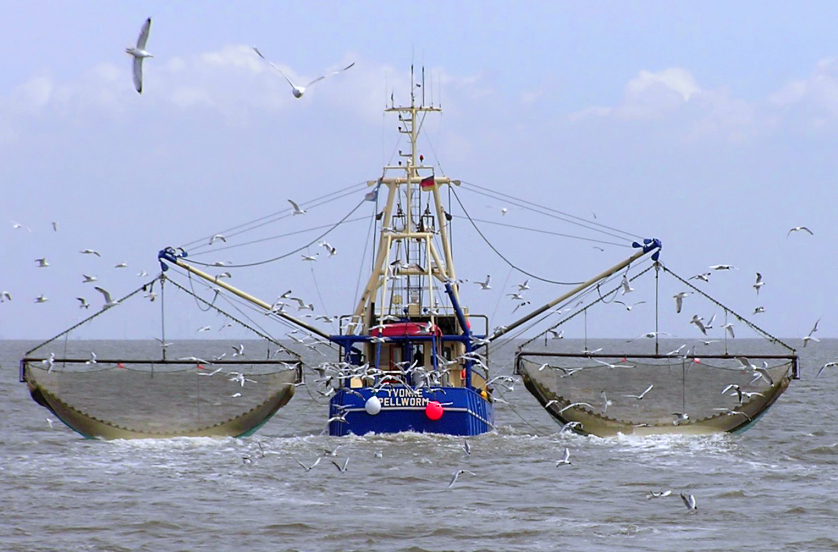
Traditional shrimp boats

The coexistence of the national park and fishery has conflict potential. While only being a small part of the national product of the west coast (ca. 1%), fishery is highly important for tourism. Tourists expect a maritime flare when having a vacation at the North Sea coast. Shrimp fishery has the biggest economic importance as a part of fishery in the North Sea region because fishing common shrimps (Crangon crangon) is not limited by catch quota. On the other hand Atlantic cod, European plaice and common sole are hardly fished at all due to strict catch quota and other protection measures.

Agriculture has a higher economic importance for the North Sea coast. But most of the land used for agriculture is located outside the national park. Only grazing of saltmarshes by sheep happens inside the park and has conflict potential to some extent.

==== Shrimp fishery ====
Shrimpers support the characteristic image of the North Sea region of Schleswig-Holstein as it counts as traditional fishery. Not until 1900 shrimp boats were used for catching shrimps, prior to which a Gliep net was the standard fishing method. The shrimper stock in Schleswig-Holstein declined over the years: in 1999 about 144 shrimp boats were fishing in the North Sea. In 2016 the stock has dropped to half. Small family businesses are affected the most. Against the odds the number of big industrial shrimp boats in the North Sea region is increasing. They can stay outside longer, as well as in bad weather.

From 2010 to 2015 about 6.000 tons of common shrimps a year were caught. In 2016 the number decreased to 2.530 tons, which is unusually small.

==== Mussel fishery ====
Common blue mussels are cultivated in an area with an extension of 1.700 ha in the North Sea area. Seeds (young mussels) for cultivation can be extracted from natural spat falls and "seed collectors". Catching common blue mussels outside cultivated areas is strictly forbidden. The cultivation of common mussels in the conservation zone 2 of the national park is limited to an area of 13 ha. Since 1997 areas that dry out during low tide are closed for mussel cultivation as well. In total only 8 common mussel cultivation areas in the national park region are allowed by law. On average approximately 10.000 tons of common mussels are harvested. From the beginning of April until mid of June harvesting is generally prohibited.

Catching common cockle and common razor shells is prohibited since 1990. Even before the prohibition, it was economically unimportant due to natural stock decreases in Schleswig-Holstein during hard winter seasons. Pacific oyster (Magallan gigas) cultivations are limited to a 30 ha big area near Sylt. These oysters are kept in heated ponds during winter. About 1 million oysters are harvested and sold on Sylt annually; approximately one third is eaten local. The Pacific oyster has widely spread in the Wadden Sea during the last years. The former blue mussel beds evolved into oyssel reefs. Attempts to catch the thick trough shell (Spisula solida) were successful in the beginning of the 1990s. During the hard winter in 1995/96 all the shells fell victim to the unusual cold weather. Since the end of 2016 thick trough shell fishery is prohibited in the national park.

==== Aquaculture and hunting ====
An experimental station for marine aquaculture is located in Büsum. The plants water supply with North Sea water comes through a pipeline which begins in the national park. While hunting in the national park area is prohibited since 1999, some hunters are still active on the Hallig Islands which are surrounded by national park conservation zones.

==== Agriculture ====
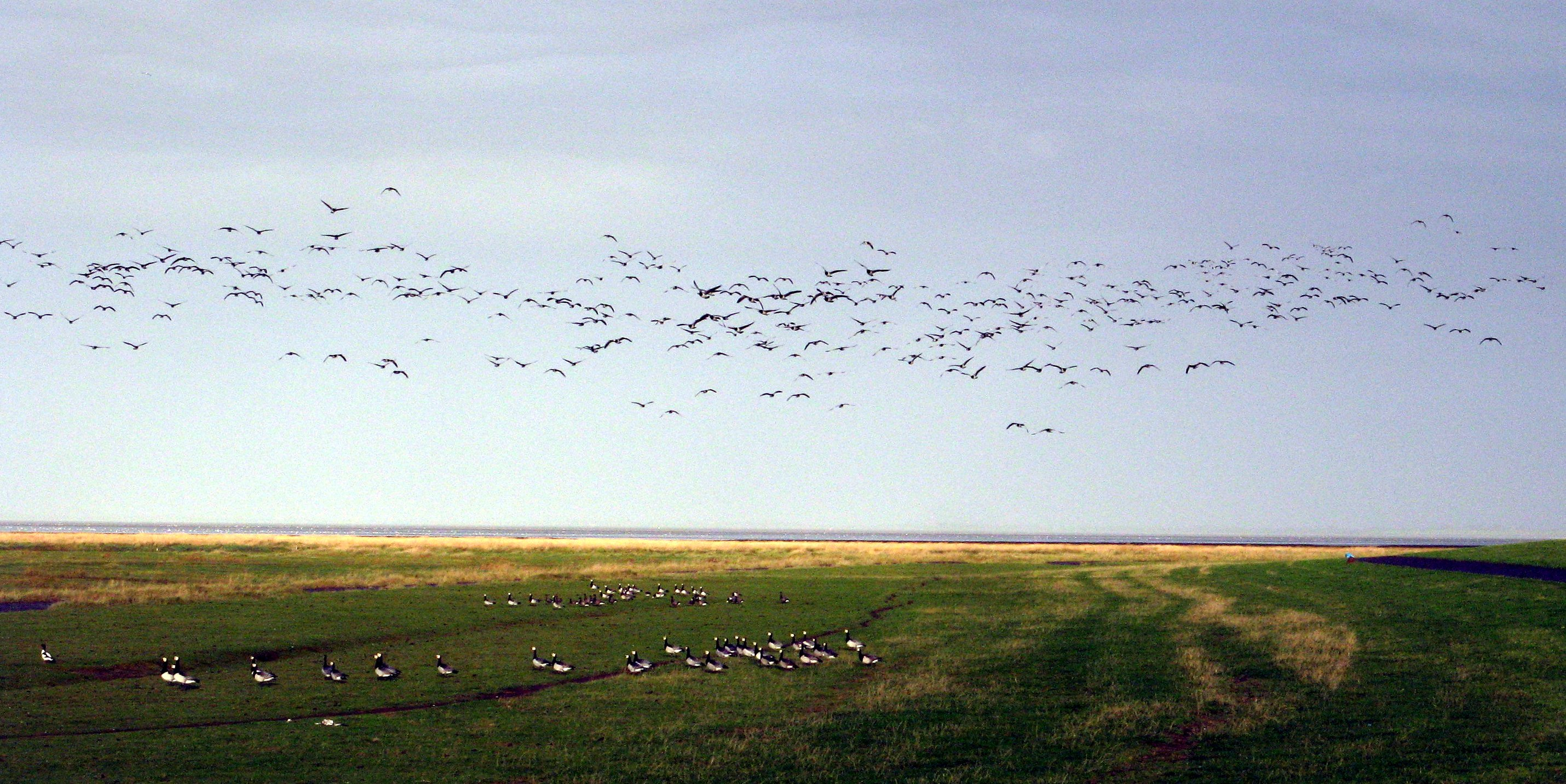
Especially barnacle geese are held responsible for feeding damages in the surrounding areas of the farmer's fields.

Besides tourism agriculture is the most important source of income for the west coast of Schleswig-Holstein. Especially southern Dithmarschen has been and still is an important agricultural export area. While most of the agriculture happens outside of the national park area (except for sheep farming), it still has some influence on the national park, for example water travels through Grüppen (drainage channels) from the fields into the North Sea.

Only sheep grazing on salt marshes happens to be a problem with agriculture and the national park. Since the first settlements salt marshes were used for grazing and sheep farming. Since the 1980s intensive grazing got subsidised by the government of Schleswig-Holstein. Nowadays only dikes itself and the dike foreshore areas shall be intensively grazed because of coastal defence manners. Salt marshes which are located more seawards shall be spared out.

From 1991 to 1996, shepherds received compensation for relinquishing the intensive grazing of seaward salt marshes as a part of the "Küstenstreifen-Programm". In the disused salt marshes water drainage got stopped as well. Because of these measures the salt marshes stock increased up to 13.5% at the coasts of North Frisia and Dithmarschen in the years from 1988 to 2014. With a total area of 12.450 ha (2006), 47% of the salt marshes were not grazed at all, 11% were grazed extensively and 38% were grazed intensively.

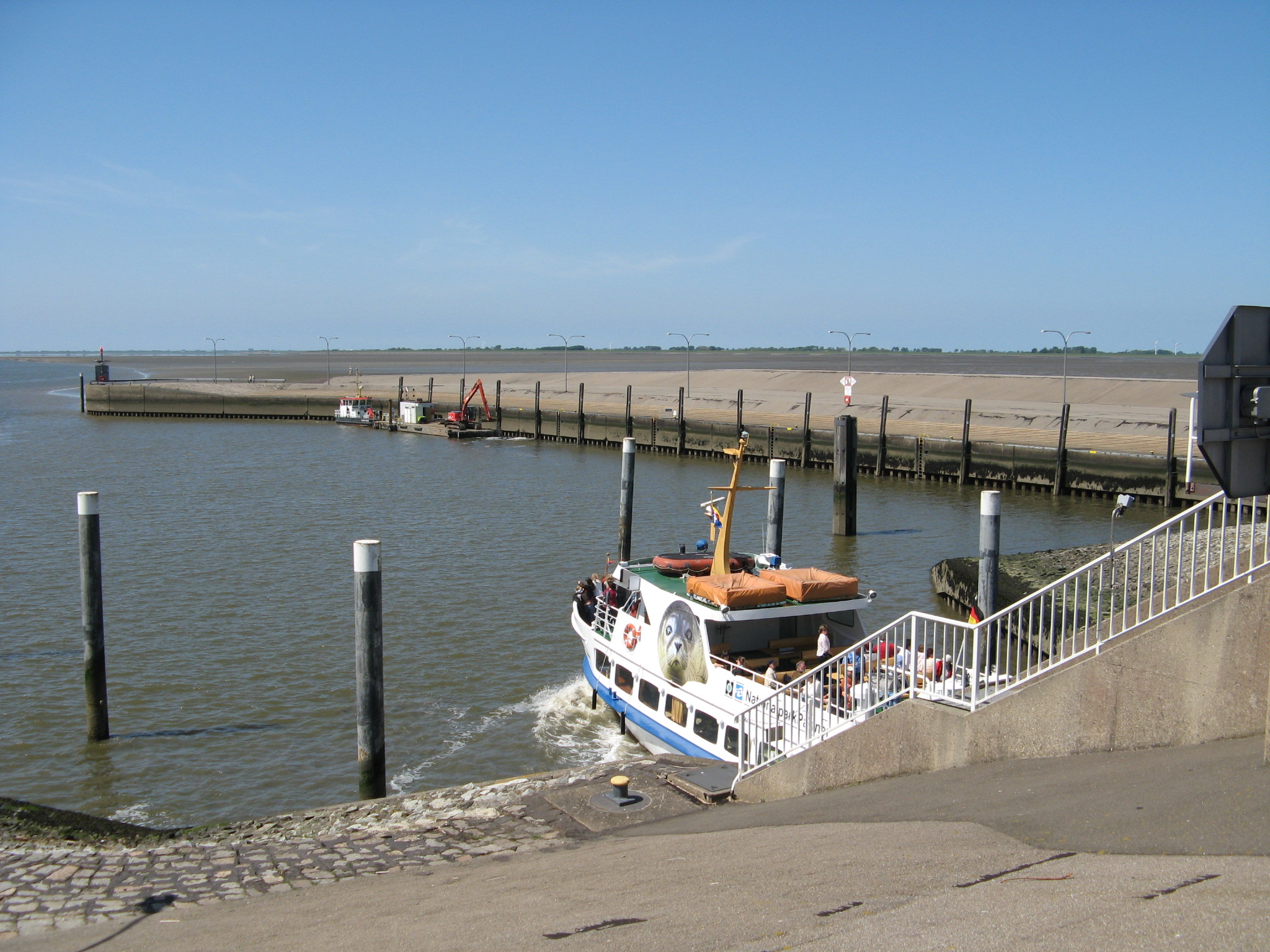
Nearly all of the offered shipping traffic in the National Park is for tourists. A lot of shipping companies cooperate with the National Park administration.

=== Transport and infrastructure ===
There are some small and medium-sized harbours (Meldorf, Büsum, Husum, Nordstrand, Pellworm, Dagebüll, Wyk auf Föhr, Amrum, Hörnum and List auf Sylt) located at the coast of Schleswig Holstein. The only possibility to reach them is driving through the national park. Responsible for most of the marine traffic are ferries driving to the North Frisian Islands. The ferry traffic routes go through shipping channels in the national park area.

A special decree on moving through the Wadden Sea by the Federal Government of Germany applies to the maritime area of the national park shipping channels. The decree allows for example temporal closure of conservation zones for the protection of breeding birds and grey seals or bans on driving during low tide. The seaward part of the national park is signed as a PSSA (Particularly Sensitive Sea Area). The marking also provides extra limitations for marine traffic especially for ships with dangerous loads. These ships are forced to take other routes (more seawards) outside of the PSSA. Very important shipping routes, like the Elbe estuary route to Hamburg are an exception.

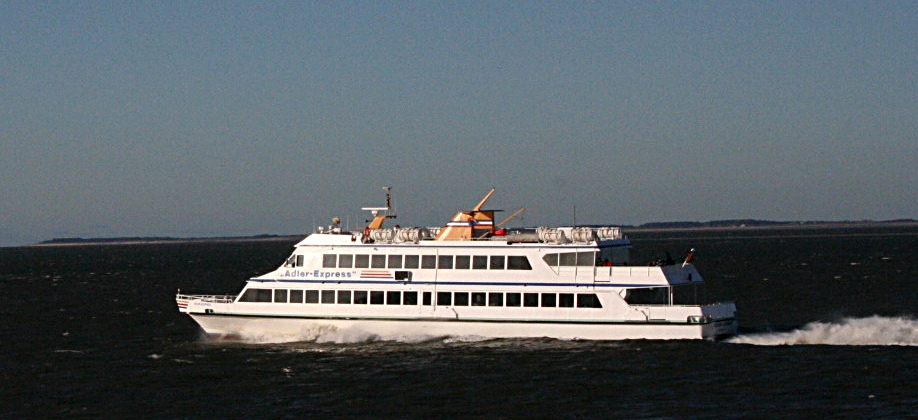
Adler-Express is a fast ferry to the islands. It isn't certified as National Park Partner. Due to its high velocities sea mammals are endangered to have too little time to escape.

The area of Schleswig-Holstein Wadden Sea National Park is located north of a strongly frequented waterway in the southern North Sea. Changing weather conditions, strong storms and limited range of sight are pretty common for the region, so naval accidents are ongoing hazards for the flora and fauna of the national park. But more common than naval accidents are oil-polluted birds due to captains illegally dumping oil into the sea close to the national park. The biggest threat the national park ever experienced happened on 29 October 1998 when the cargo ship MV Pallas, on fire and abandoned, ran aground near the island Amrum. Approximately 244 tons of oil flew into the North Sea.

Because of being completely surrounded by the national park area, the supply chain of the islands and Hallig islands goes through the national park inevitably. Besides the supply transported by ships, other essentials like energy, data or water pipes lead through the national park as well. Also civic air traffic is passing over the national park area.

=== Oil, offshore wind power and sand ===
The only operating offshore oil platform of Germany "Mittelplate A" is located adjacent to Trischen Island in the national park area. It exploits the most considerable oilfield of Germany since 1987 in up to 2000 – 3000 meter water depth. The obtained oil was originally transported by oil tankers to Brunsbüttel but since 2005 the oil is carried away by an underground pipeline. Besides the obvious disturbing factors for the environment, noise level and lighting are considerable disturbances for the breeding birds as well.

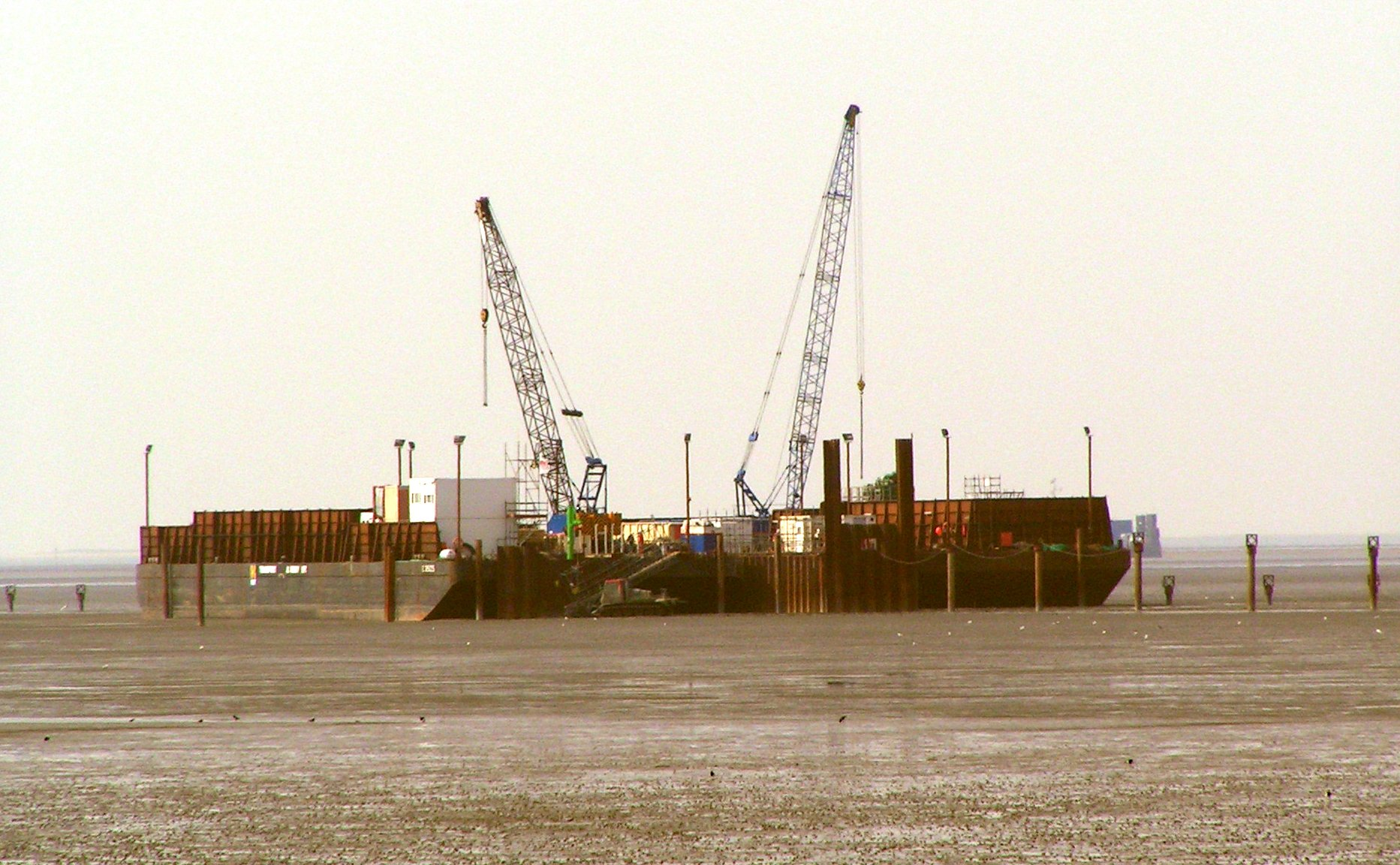
Construction of the pipeline to connect Mittelplate A and land

The construction of further oil platforms is prohibited by national park law and the Trilateral Wadden Sea Cooperation (TWSC). It is assumed that further oil fields are located in the south of the operated field near the Elbe River and in the salt domes around Büsum and Oldenswort. It is unknown if it's possible to exploit the oil fields from stations outside the national park area but it's pretty unlikely that they can be tapped by the Mittelplate A. The operating concern of the "Mittelplate A" RWE Dea requested 5 additional exploratory drilling in the national park area. The responsible mining authority gave the permission but according to an inspection by the Landtag of Schleswig-Holstein it is illegitimate. The political discourse still goes on today.

Wind energy in Schleswig-Holstein is only won by onshore wind parks, which are built in the coastal region bordering the national park. First economical important offshore wind farms are planned seawards outside the national park. The sea cable connection from the offshore wind farms to land might cause some disturbances while being built.

While it is generally forbidden to extract resources for commercial use from the national park, an exception is being made for coastal defence purposes. 1.1 Million Cubic meters are extracted every year for example for beach replenishment at the west coast of Sylt, for renewing the Hallig islands or to restore dikes.

=== Military ===
Since the foundation of the Wadden Sea National Park the Bundeswehr gave up its military test area at Sylt. The military testing area in the southern part of Meldorf Bay is still active but it's not used for testing bombs and napalm anymore, like in the past. In the 1960s arm manufacturers tested munitions and projectiles while aiming at the Wadden Sea during 130 days a year, heavily disturbing the local fauna. The projectiles had been salvaged with the help of helicopters. Nowadays companies are still allowed to test ammunition in the military testing area near the Wadden Sea during two days a year. Additionally military training flights are located within the national park area regularly. The aircraft aren’t allowed to come below a flying altitude of 900 m.

It is mostly unknown how much ammunition from World War 2 is still located in the Wadden Sea of Schleswig-Holstein. The German marine plunged the remaining munition mostly undocumented in the mudflats. Although most of the munition seems to be dumped in the Lower Saxony part of the Wadden Sea, it is assumed that a total mass of 400,000 – 1,300,000 tons can be found in the Schleswig-Holstein Wadden Sea. The exact locations of the plunged munitions are mostly unknown. Only some places west of Sylt are known to be used as munition graveyards. Due to corrosion heavy pollutants might be set free in the environment. Tourists and fishermen are in great danger when they unluckily come in contact with ammunition remains.

== See also ==
- Wadden Sea National Parks
- Lower Saxony Wadden Sea National Park
- Hamburg Wadden Sea National Park

== Literature ==
- Common Wadden Sea Secretariat (CWSS) (Hrsg.): Nomination of the Dutch-German Wadden Sea as World Heritage Site. 2008 als PDF
- Landesamt für den Nationalpark Schleswig-Holsteinisches Wattenmeer (Hrsg.): Wattenmeermonitoring 2000 – Schriftenreihe des Nationalparks Schleswig-Holsteinisches Wattenmeer, Sonderheft, Tönning 2001
- Landesamt für den Nationalpark Schleswig-Holsteinisches Wattenmeer (Hrsg.): SÖM-Bericht 2008 als pdf
- Landesamt für den Nationalpark Schleswig-Holsteinisches Wattenmeer / Landesamt für den Nationalpark Niedersächsisches Wattenmeer / Umweltbundesamt (Hrsg.): Umweltatlas Wattenmeer. Bd. 1 (Nordfriesisches und Dithmarscher Wattenmeer), Verlag Ulmer, Stuttgart, ISBN 3-8001-3492-6
- Ministerium für Landwirtschaft, Umweltschutz und Ländliche Räume des Landes Schleswig-Holstein (MLUL) (Hrsg.): Bericht zur Überprüfung des Biosphärenreservats Schleswig-Holsteinisches Wattenmeer und Halligen durch die UNESCO. Berichtszeitraum 1990 bis 2005. Juni 2005 als pdf
- Dirk Legler: Die Organisation deutscher Nationalparkverwaltungen. Nomos, Baden-Baden 2006, ISBN 3-8329-1978-3
- Martin Stock et al.: Salzwiesen an der Westküste von Schleswig-Holstein 1986–2001. Boyens Buchverlag, Heide 2005, ISBN 3-8042-0703-0

== Filmography ==
- Im Nationalpark Wattenmeer. Documentary, 45 min., Germany, 1998, by Jens-Uwe Heins and Michael Sutor, Production: Komplett-Media-GmbH, Grünwald (ISBN 3-89672-492-4), Brief description by the ARD
