= German Bight =

Geographic feature along the coasts of Denmark, Germany, and the Netherlands

Coordinates: 54°27′14″N 7°12′50″E

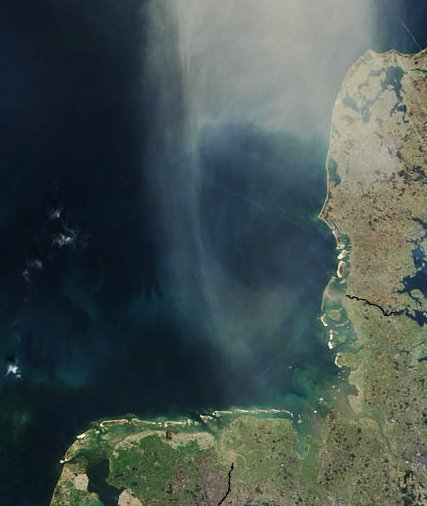
Satellite view of the German Bight, Jutland to the right (east)

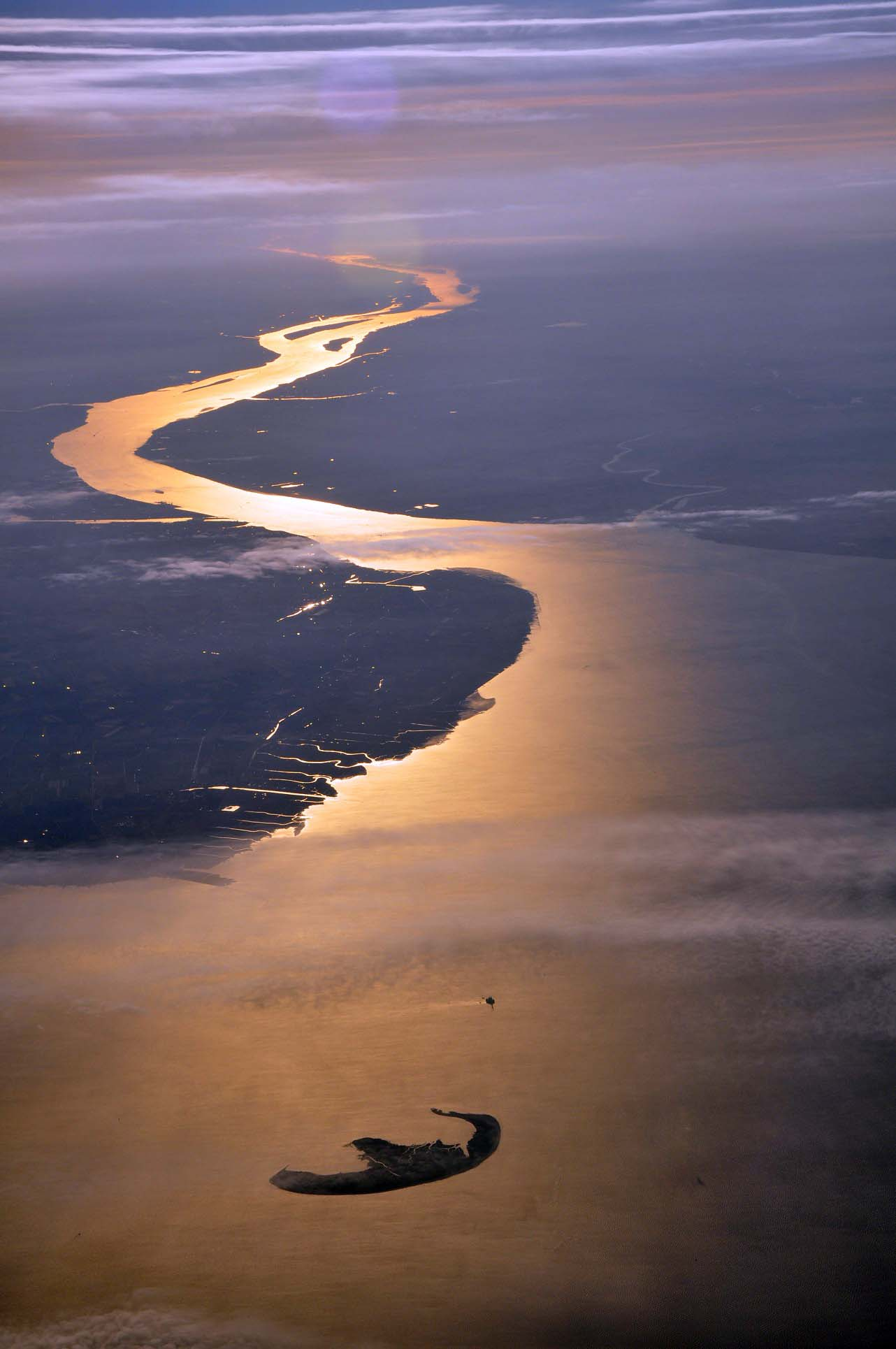
The mouth of the river Elbe, here in October 2010, marks the southeastern corner of the German Bight. The island is Trischen.

The German Bight (German: Deutsche Bucht [ˈdɔʏtʃə ˈbʊxt]; Danish: tyske bugt; Dutch: Duitse bocht [ˈdœytsə ˈbɔxt]); West Frisian: Dútske bocht; North Frisian: Schiisk Bocht; sometimes also the German Bay) is the southeastern bight of the North Sea bounded by the Netherlands and Germany to the south, and Denmark and Germany to the east (the Jutland peninsula). To the north and west it is limited by the Dogger Bank. The Bight contains the Frisian and Danish Islands. The Wadden Sea is approximately ten to twelve kilometres (6 to 10 miles) wide at the location of the German Bight. The Frisian islands and the nearby coastal areas are collectively known as Frisia. The southern portion of the bight is also known as the Heligoland Bight. Between 1949 and 1956 the BBC Sea Area Forecast (Shipping Forecast) used "Heligoland" as the designation for the area now referred to as German Bight.

== Use ==
The German Bight contains some of Germany's largest national parks by area, the aim of which is to protect the Wadden Sea, a UNESCO World Heritage Site in the "nature" category. Due to being divided among three different states of Germany those protected areas fall into three different national parks, namely the Lower Saxon Wadden Sea National Park, the Schleswig-Holstein Wadden Sea National Park and the small Hamburg Wadden Sea National Park mostly around the island of Neuwerk. Despite or maybe because of its unique natural environment, the German Bight is also subject to intense economic and recreational use with the Wadden Sea being one of Germany's most popular tourist destinations. Mudflat hiking is a particularly popular tourist activity usually undertaken with licensed guides employed by the national park service. Fishing and shellfish banks (particularly oysters) are other important economic activities, with the shrimp Crangon crangon a particularly well regarded product of local fishing. Energy extraction also plays an important role with Germany's only offshore oil rig (Mittelplate) located in the German Bight and an increasing penetration by offshore wind farms such as Alpha Ventus. While offshore wind farms are more expensive to build and require more expensive operations for maintenance and repair than land-based wind turbines the steadier winds out at sea allow for steadier power output and a higher capacity factor.

== Traffic ==
The German Bight has also played an important role as a shipping lane since medieval times with the approach to the Port of Hamburg passing through it and then the Elbe River estuary. Other important ports along the German Bight are Bremerhaven/Bremen, Emden (important for export of motorcars, particularly those made at the local VW plant) and the JadeWeserPort at Wilhelmshaven which is Germany's only deepwater port. Shipping in the German Bight often relies on tidal channels (called "Priel" in German) for shipping lanes, but as the sediment is moved around by tides, wind and waves and as ships reach ever greater draughts extensive dredging is necessary to keep shipping lanes open. Some of the East Frisian Islands can be reached on foot at low tide and the sailing schedules of local ferries are tide-dependent. While the mudflats are usually barred to anything but foot traffic and more heavily protected areas of the national parks are off-limits to all but scientists, there is a scheduled horse drawn carriage service from the mainland to Neuwerk locally known as a Wattwagen (mud flats wagon). The island of Sylt can be reached by the railway-only Hindenburgdamm causeway which was built after World War I when the port on the mainland from which ferries to Sylt had left up to that point came under Danish rule following the 1920 Schleswig plebiscites. Some of the Halligen also have railway connections to the mainland but in some cases those are only usable at low tide. Those lines are the Dagebüll–Oland–Langeneß island railway and the Lüttmoorsiel-Nordstrandischmoor island railway. While there is no scheduled traffic, island residents can use their own (usually self-built) rail vehicles. In the past those were sail bogeys, but nowadays most are diesel driven draisines with battery-electric railcars increasingly gaining ground. The rail lines are also used by the government for coastal protection work and to transport goods and personnel.

== See also ==
- Bight (geography)
- Frisia
- Frisian Islands
- Wadden Sea
