= Nigehörn =

Artificial island in the North Sea

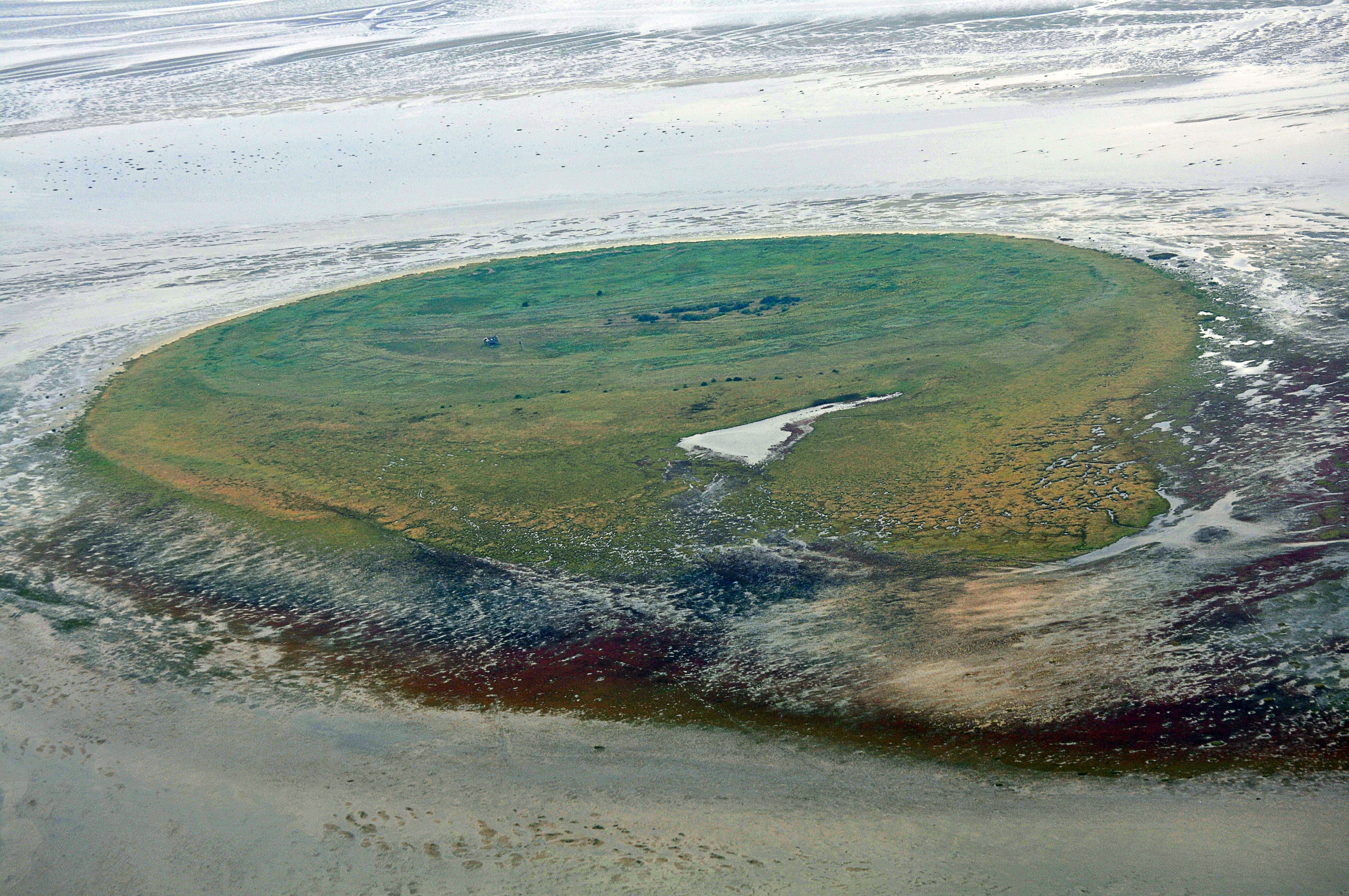
- Aerial photograph of Nigehörn
- Interactive map of Nigehörn

Geography
- Location: North Sea, Wadden Sea, Elbe mouth
- Coordinates: 53°56′53″N 8°25′49″E
- Area: 50 ha (120 acres)

Administration
- Germany
- State: Hamburg
- Borough: Hamburg-Mitte
- Quarter: Hamburg-Neuwerk

Demographics
- Population: 0 (uninhabited)
- Pop. density: 0/km^{2} (0/sq mi)

Nigehörn (German pronunciation: [ˈniːɡəˌhœʁn]) is an uninhabited artificial island in the North Sea belonging to the German city of Hamburg.

== Geography ==
Located by the mouth of the Elbe, Nigehörn lies on the same sandbank as Scharhörn, about 4 km (2 1/2 mi) northwest of Neuwerk and 15 km (9 mi) northwest from Cuxhaven on the mainland. The island is a part of Zone 1 of the Hamburg Wadden Sea National Park.

Rising about 5 m (16 ft) above sea level, it is not protected from storm surges, and is at risk of coastal erosion, especially on the western side.

The sandbank on which Scharhörn and Nigehörn lie is a European Union Natura 2000-designated bird sanctuary, tended to by the environmental group Verein Jordsand. The area, known as Scharhörnplate, is around 2.8 km (1.7 mi) long and 1.5 km (0.93 mi) wide with an area of approximately 50 hectares (120 acres). Unlike Scharhörn, where visitors may obtain official permission to visit, public access to Nigehörn is strictly forbidden.

== Construction and history ==
Nigehörn was constructed in 1989 as a land fill to compensate for ongoing land loss on nearby Scharhörn, which threatened to deprive shorebirds of important breeding grounds. Approximately 1.2 million cubic metres (42,000,000 cu ft) of sand were deposited on the sandbank by hydraulic fill to create the core of the new island.

Dune stabilization was achieved using barriers made from brushwood arranged in a double-circle around the core, with "rays" extending outward from the circles to catch and hold down flying sand. Three eastward-pointing double-bows of similar construction were built across the core to trap and retain sand in the heart of the island. Traces of these patterns can still be seen on aerial photographs of the island today, though they are by now weathered, sand-covered, and (in the western part of the island) eroded.

The newly constructed island measured 30 hectares (74 acres) in total area. As pioneer flora began to colonise the island, helping the pre-existing structures to hold down sediment, Nigehörn began to grow naturally into the surrounding tidal mudflats. In this manner, the area of the island has increased over time to approximately 50 hectares (120 acres).
