= Wadden Sea Conservation Station =

The Wadden Sea Conservation Station (German: Schutzstation Wattenmeer) is a non-profit NGO in North Germany. The organisation was founded in 1962 and, since then, has been one of the official NGO partners of the Wadden Sea National Parks. Today, the conservation group employs over 100 young people, both volunteers and paid workers, at its headquarters in Husum and the 17 stations on the westcoast of Schleswig-Holstein.

The main work of the organisation is running continuous monitoring programmes, such as bird-monitoring, monitoring of the tidal-influenced benthos and coastal-monitoring. Also, the station carries out a wide programme of guided tours, information evenings and other PR activities.

At Westerhever, at Hallig Hooge and at Hallig Langeneß, the stations run three training establishments. Since 2009, there has been a German Foundation "Stiftung Schutzstation Wattenmeer" which supports the everyday work of the organisation.
