= Amrum (disambiguation) =

Amrum may refer to:

== Places ==
- Amrum, one of the North Frisian Islands
  - Amrum Lighthouse, a lighthouse on Amrum
  - Amrum Frisian, a dialect spoken on Amrum
  - Amrumer Mühle, a windmill on Amrum
- Amrum Bank, a bank off the coast of Amrum

== Ships ==
- MV Amrum, a Kriegsmarine coastal tanker in service 1938-45
- SS Amrum, a coaster in service 1926–31

== Others ==
- Amrum (film), 2025 movie by Turkish-German filmmaker Fatih Akin
