= Norddorf =

Norddorf auf Amrum Noorsaarep üüb Oomram / Nordtorp
- Municipality
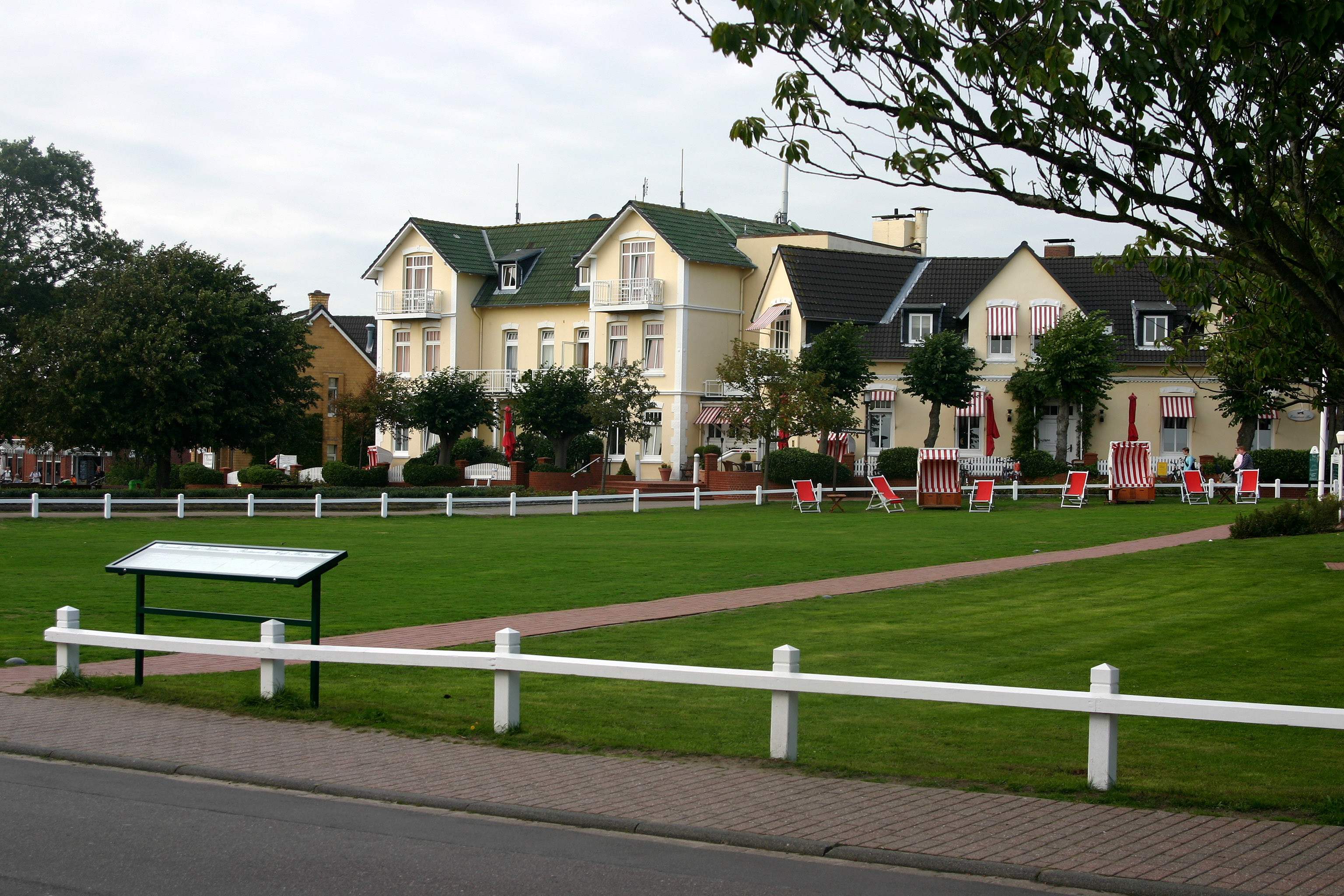

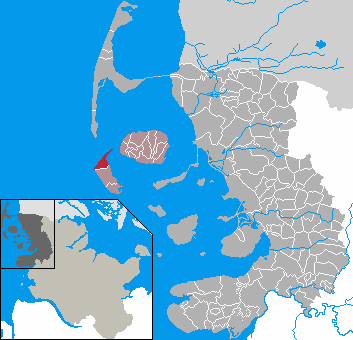
- Location of Norddorf auf Amrum; Noorsaarep üüb Oomram / Nordtorp within Nordfriesland district
- Interactive map of Norddorf auf Amrum; Noorsaarep üüb Oomram / Nordtorp
- Location within Germany Location within Schleswig-Holstein
- Coordinates: 54°41′N 8°20′E
- Country: Germany
- State: Schleswig-Holstein
- District: Nordfriesland
- Municipal assoc.: Föhr-Amrum

Government
  - Mayor: Peter Koßmann

Area
  - Total: 5.9 km^{2} (2.3 sq mi)
- Elevation: 0 m (0 ft)

Population (2025-12-31)
  - Total: 546
  - Density: 93/km^{2} (240/sq mi)
- Time zone: UTC+01:00 (CET)
  - Summer (DST): UTC+02:00 (CEST)
- Postal codes: 25946
- Dialling codes: 04682
- Vehicle registration: NF
- Website: www.amt-foehr-amrum.de

Norddorf auf Amrum (Öömrang: Noorsaarep üüb Oomram, Danish: Nordtorp) is a municipality on the island of Amrum, in the district of Nordfriesland, in Schleswig-Holstein, Germany.

== History ==
Together with Süddorf, Norddorf is the oldest village of the island. In 1890, Friedrich von Bodelschwingh founded a number of seaside hospices in Norddorf proper and north of it. Due to this, the place developed into a seaside resort. In 1925, great parts of the village were destroyed by a fire, so today's view of the village is dominated by mostly modern houses without thatched roofs. Today, the hospices now serve other purposes or no longer exist.

During the early 20th century, the so-called Kniephafen harbour existed north of Norddorf at Amrum's vast Kniepsand beach. The port was navigable by greater vessels and it most of all served the nautical traffic between Amrum and the port of Hörnum on the neighbouring island of Sylt. The Kniephafen was linked to the network of Amrum's island railway. In 1938, the pier was last moved further north due to proceeding aggradation. With the adjoining of the Kniepsand beach to the belt of dunes on Amrum's western shore, the harbour had to be abandoned.

Until December 31, 2006, Norddorf, together with Nebel and Wittdün, formed the Amt Amrum.

== Politics ==
Since the municipal elections of 2008, the Norddorfer Bürgerblock holds five of nine seats in Nebel's council, the CDU holds four.

== Sights ==
Tourist attractions include a duck decoy south of the village, a centre for natural history with its focus on environmental protection, as well as the Kniepsand beach to the west.

From Norddorf, Amrum's northernmost edge, called Odde, can be reached. An important bird area is located there, where Charadriiformes and other species of the Wadden Sea tidal flats may be observed. Guided tours are available.

A belt of dunes extends north, south, and southwest of Norddorf. Amrum's highest dune (32 m), called a Siatler, can be found there. On it, there is an observation platform. Further southwest, one can find the Norddorf sector light with its Art Nouveau elements. The light was established in 1906 and serves as a navigational aid for the Vortrapptief channel. Its bearings have got a range of 16.1 nmi (29.8 km) (white), 12.9 nmi (23.9 km) (red) and 9.8 nmi (18.1 km) (green).

== Economy ==
With 422,319 lodgings booked by 43,316 guests in 2005, the municipality ranks among the top ten places of tourist importance in Schleswig-Holstein.

== Notable people ==
- Georg Quedens (born 1934), photographer, author of non-fictional books, natural scientist, and local historian
- Knut Jungbohn Clement (1803–1873), historian and linguist.
