= Georg Quedens =

German photographer and non-fiction writer

- Born: 1934 (age 91–92); Norddorf, Amrum, Germany
- Occupations: Photographer, non-fiction author, naturalist, local historian

Georg Quedens (born 1934 in Norddorf) is a German photographer and non-fiction writer as well as a local and natural historian.

== Life and work ==
Quedens has been living on the island of Amrum since he was born, and so his work has been influenced by the nature and history of the island. Since 1961, when his first photo-book was published, he has written more than 50 books about Amrum and other North Frisian islands. He is a regular contributor to the regional newspaper of Amrum and Föhr, Der Insel-Bote, but his photographs have been used by calendars and magazines on a national scale in Germany.

Quedens moreover holds public lectures on the North Sea region on a regular base and has been editing an annual chronicle of Amrum since 1983.

== Reception, awards and decorations ==
A documentary film about the life and work of Georg Quedens was shown in 1999 at the Lübeck Nordic Film Days.

Quedens was awarded the 2004 Hans Momsen Prize for merits on the cultural life in Nordfriesland district. In 2009, the Minister President of Schleswig-Holstein, Peter Harry Carstensen, decorated him with the cross of the Order of Merit of the Federal Republic of Germany.

== Selected works ==
- Georg Quedens (1964). Hansen, Margot; Hansen, Nico (eds.). Amrum. Geschichte und Gestalt einer Insel [Amrum. History and Geography of an Island] (in German). Itzehoe: Hansen & Hansen.
- Georg Quedens (1968). Nordsee-Natur. Ein Bildband von der Küste [North Sea Nature. A Photo-book from the Coast] (in German). Heide, Holstein: Boyens & Co. ISBN 3-8042-0022-2.
- — (2002) [1974]. Föhr. Die Welt der Inseln und Halligen (in German) (12th ed.). Breklum: Breklumer Verlag. ISBN 3-7793-1111-9.
- — (1987) [1976]. Vögel der Nordsee [North Sea Birds]. Die Welt der Inseln und Halligen (in German) (4th ed.). Breklum: Breklumer Verlag. ISBN 3-7793-1115-1.
- — (1979). Amrumer Geschichten. Öömrang staken [Stories from Amrum]. Veröffentlichung des Nordfriisk Instituut (in German and Öömrang). Hamburg: Nordfriisk Instituut. ISBN 3-87118-372-5.
- — (1983). Die Vogelwelt der Insel Amrum. Mit einem Abriss der Amrumer Säugetier- und Amphibienwelt [The Realm of Birds of Amrum. With an Introduction to the Mammals and Amphibians of Amrum] (in German). Hamburg: Helmut Buske. ISBN 3-87118-595-7.
- — (2009). Weltnaturerbe Wattenmeer [World Natural Heritage Wadden Sea] (in German). Hamburg: Ellert & Richter. ISBN 978-3-8319-0386-3.
