= Nebel, Germany =

Nebel Neebel
- Municipality
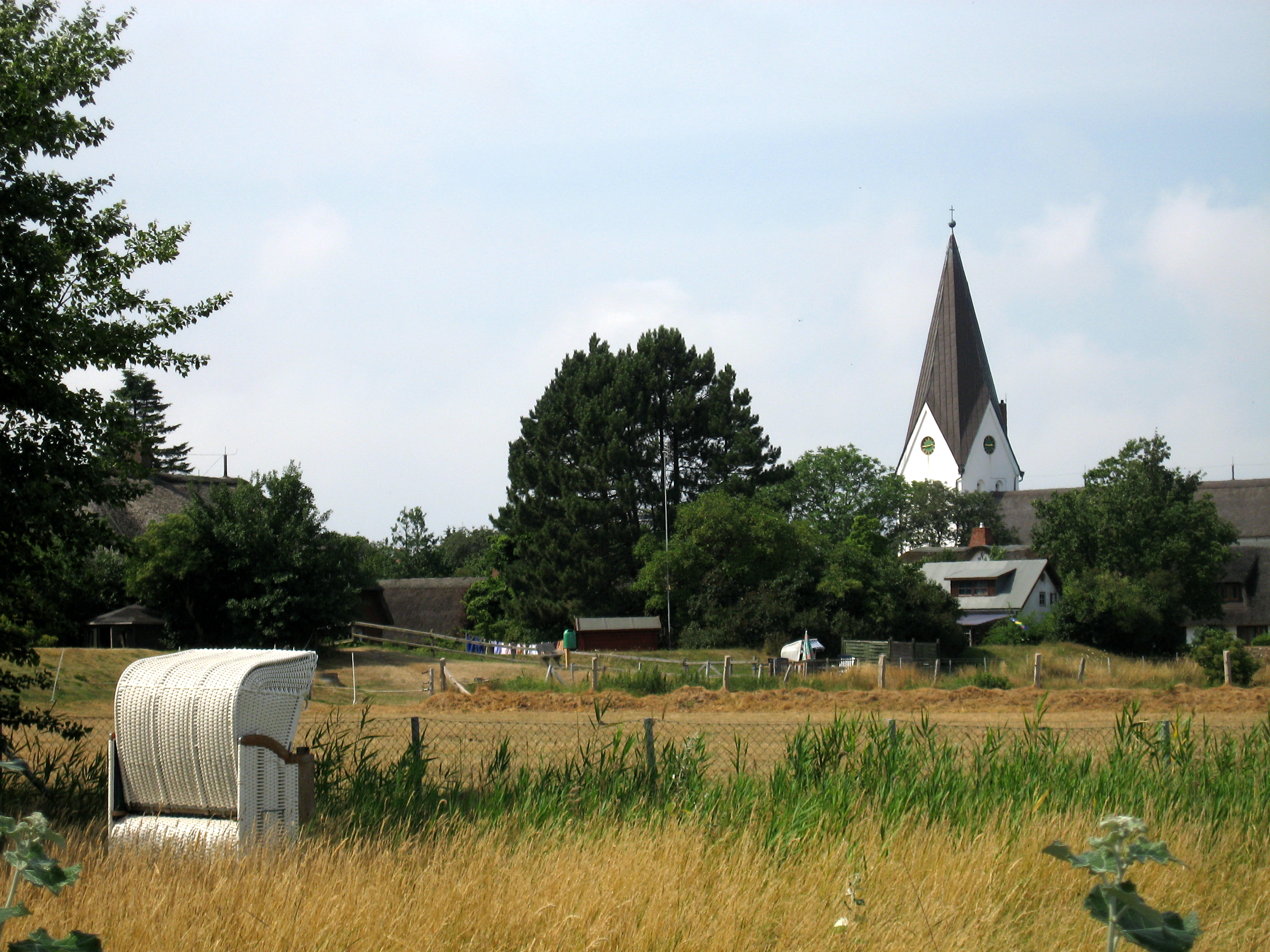

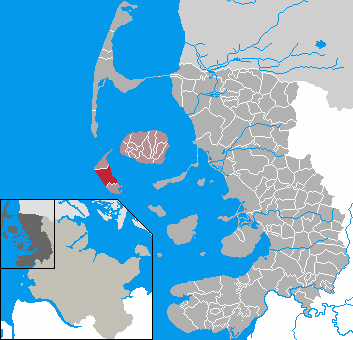
- Location of Nebel; Neebel within Nordfriesland district
- Interactive map of Nebel; Neebel
- Location within Germany Location within Schleswig-Holstein
- Coordinates: 54°39′11″N 8°21′18″E
- Country: Germany
- State: Schleswig-Holstein
- District: Nordfriesland
- Municipal assoc.: Föhr-Amrum

Government
  - Mayor: Bernd Dell Missier

Area
  - Total: 11.95 km^{2} (4.61 sq mi)
- Elevation: 6 m (20 ft)

Population (2025-12-31)
  - Total: 883
  - Density: 73.9/km^{2} (191/sq mi)
- Time zone: UTC+01:00 (CET)
  - Summer (DST): UTC+02:00 (CEST)
- Postal codes: 25946
- Dialling codes: 04682
- Vehicle registration: NF
- Website: www.amt-foehr-amrum.de

Nebel (German pronunciation: [ˈneːbl̩]; Öömrang: Neebel, Danish: Nebel or Nybøl) is a municipality on the island of Amrum in the district of Nordfriesland in Schleswig-Holstein, Germany.

== Geography and traffic ==
Until the end of 2006, Nebel was the seat of the Amt Amrum and as such it was the administrative centre of the island of Amrum. Süddorf (Öömrang: Sössaarep) and Steenodde (Stianood) are minor districts of Nebel. The western part of the village is called Westerheide.

Nebel is situated on the bus line from Wittdün to Norddorf. Until 1939 Nebel had a rail head station of Amrum's island railway. In Steenodde, there is a small harbour.

== History ==
Nebel was presumably founded in the early 16th century. It is thought that the name is derived from the words nei and bel, where the former means "new" and the latter is based on the ancient Danish term boli, "settlement" (confer Niebüll and Nieblum).

The church of St. Clement was built in 1236 and was standing between the villages of Norddorf and Süddorf prior to the foundation of Nebel.

== Village districts ==
=== Steenodde ===
Steenodde (Öömrang: Stianood, Danish: Stenodde) is the smallest hamlet on Amrum. It is directly located on the shore of the tidal flats of the Wadden Sea east of Amrum. Notable attractions include dolmens and grave mounds which are a common sight in the area.

Steenodde has its own trafficable dock. The hamlet used to be a port for the ferry line Amrum-Halligen-Schlüttsiel, today there is a small port for minor freight vessels and for yachts below 12 m of length. The oldest house on Amrum, the former inn Zum lustigen Seehund ("The Merry Seal") is located in Steenodde, it was constructed in 1720.

=== Süddorf ===
Süddorf (Öömr.: Sössaarep, Dan.: Sydtorp) was first recorded in 1446 and is therefore thought to be the oldest hamlet on the isle. The sailor Hark Olufs, a native of Süddorf, became famous in the 18th century while serving the Bey of Constantine, Algeria.

In the late 19th century, a windmill was erected on an old grave mound. It had already been built in 1775 on the neighbouring island of Sylt but was later relocated to Süddorf. Today it is used as a dwelling house.

On the southwestern edge of Süddorf, there is the Satteldüne sanitorium, which specialises in the treatment of diseases of the respiratory system of children and adolescents. Moreover, Amrum's school house, the Öömrang Skuul with elementary and secondary divisions, is located in this part of Nebel.

South of Süddorf, still within the municipality's limits, the Amrum lighthouse is located. It took up service on January 1, 1875 and it has got the second-highest navigational light along the German North Sea shores next to the light of Heligoland. The tower is built on a 27 m high dune. The fire itself is located at 63 m above sea level and carries as far as 23.3 nautical miles (43.2 km). The lighthouse is Amrum's most prominent building.

== Politics ==
Since the municipal elections of 2008, the Nebeler Bürgerblock holds seven seats, the CDU holds three and the SPD holds one seat of Nebel's municipality council.

== Sights ==
Another mill, built in 1771 by Erk Knudten, hosts a museum of local history which also features exhibitions of works by various artists during the summer months. It is a Dutch horizontal type mill which was in use until 1962. Pastor Erich Pörksen saved the building from being torn down by founding a society for the preservation of the Amrum windmill in 1963. The mill is still operable today.

Opposite of the windmill, the Graveyard of the Homeless is located, where unidentified drowned persons are buried. Most graves date back to the early 20th century, the youngest being from 1969. Since then, all bodies washed ashore on Amrum's beaches could reliably be identified due to improved forensic techniques. Each tomb is decorated with a simple wooden cross into which the date of the body's retrieval from the sea is carved.

The navigational light "Nebel", erected in 1981, is a modern aluminium construction of 9.6 m height. Due to its location, this leading light for the Norderaue channel has a height of 16 m above mean high tide sea level and carries as far as 19.5 nautical miles (36.1 km).

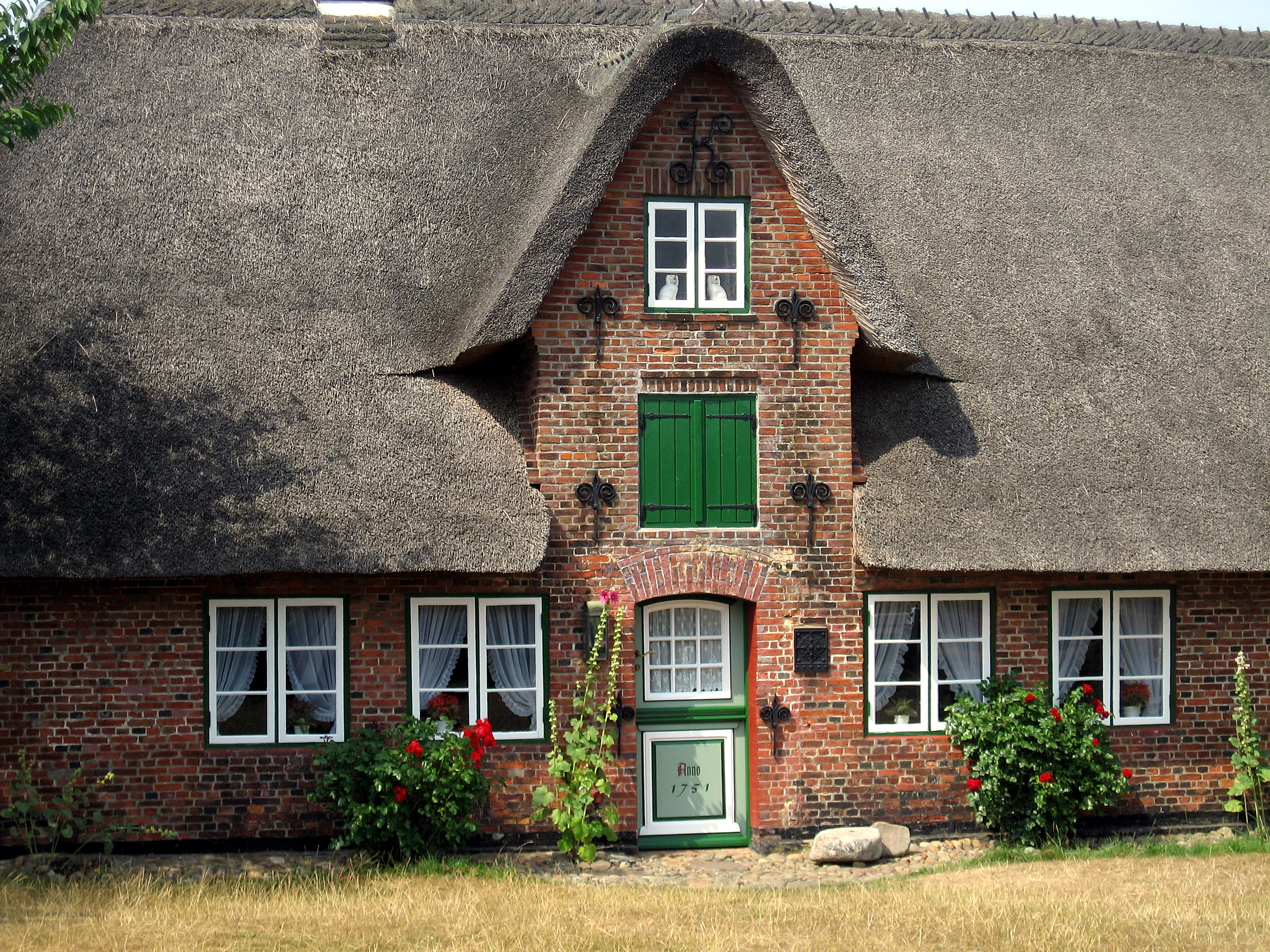
Öömrang Hüs.

The Öömrang Hüs at Waaswai 1, Nebel, is a largely original ancient Frisian house from around 1751 which is owned by the folklore society Öömrang Ferian. The original owner was a sea captain who had his ship depicted on a tile mural in the house's living room. The home decor of former times is presented in the rooms of the Öömrang Hüs, which is opened to the public. In the attic, various exhibitions are held and one can celebrate official wedding ceremonies in the living room.

The centre of Nebel is distinguished by further thatched 18th and 19th century homes.

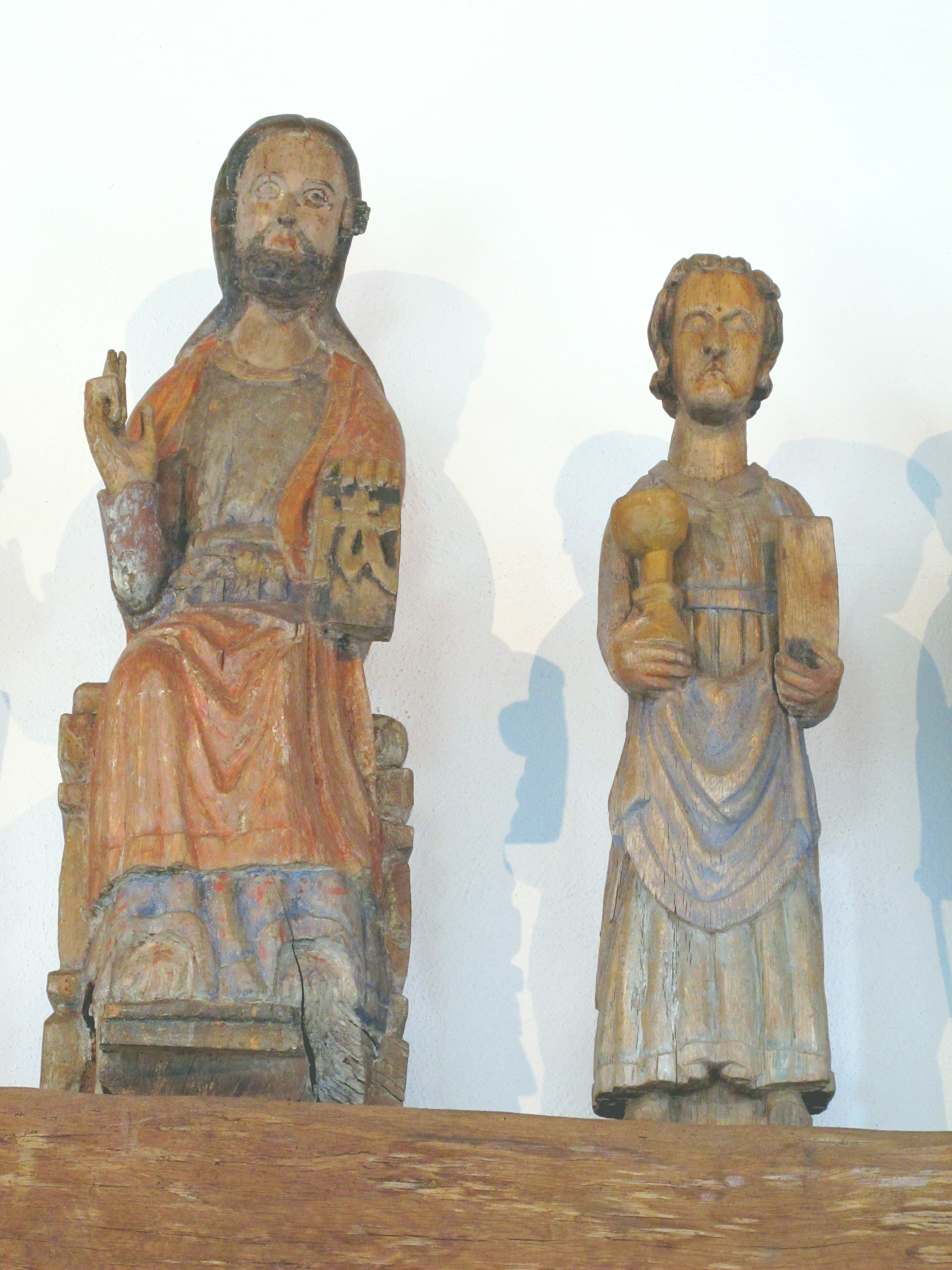
Two apostles of The Divine Sacrament

The equally thatched church of St. Clement hosts a number of artifacts. Among them a Gothic wooden group of apostles called "The Divine Sacrament" which allegedly had been washed ashore during a storm surge. The baptismal font hails from Roman times. The narrow nave, which includes by a low gallery along its flank and over the entrance, communicates the vision of a ship's hull. Also worth a sight is the graveyard of this very church with its tombs from the times between 1670 and 1830. Not only do those tombstones depict ships, but they also contain a short narration on the life of the deceased. As of July 2008, the parish is facing conservational problems though. Especially lichen as well as moss are continuously destroying the ancient headstones. A professional cleansing is required but will be very costly. Thus ideas have been uttered to bury endangered tombstones into the soil, so bacteria could decompose the moss and lichen. The 36 m high church tower, tiled with copper plates, was only built in 1908.

St. Clement's parish owns a rare copy of the Missale Slesvicense, a liturgical book printed in 1486 by Steffen Arndes. Only four exemplars of this book are preserved at all and it is thought to be the oldest book ever printed in Schleswig-Holstein and Denmark. The book is kept in the archives of the North Elbian Evangelical Church at Kiel and is infrequently displayed in the churchhouse.

Church of St. Clement at Nebel

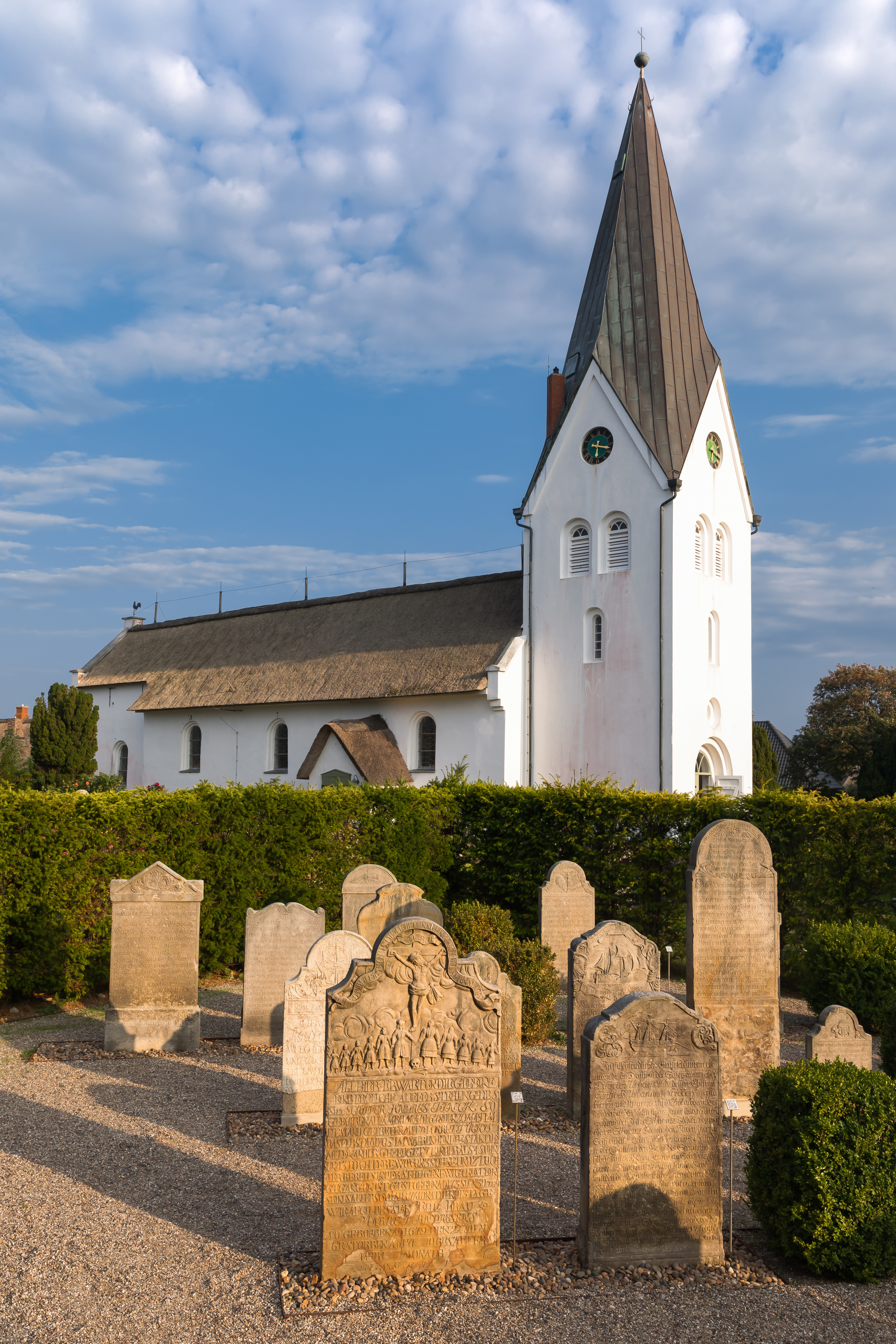
Church of St. Clement with story-telling gravestones.

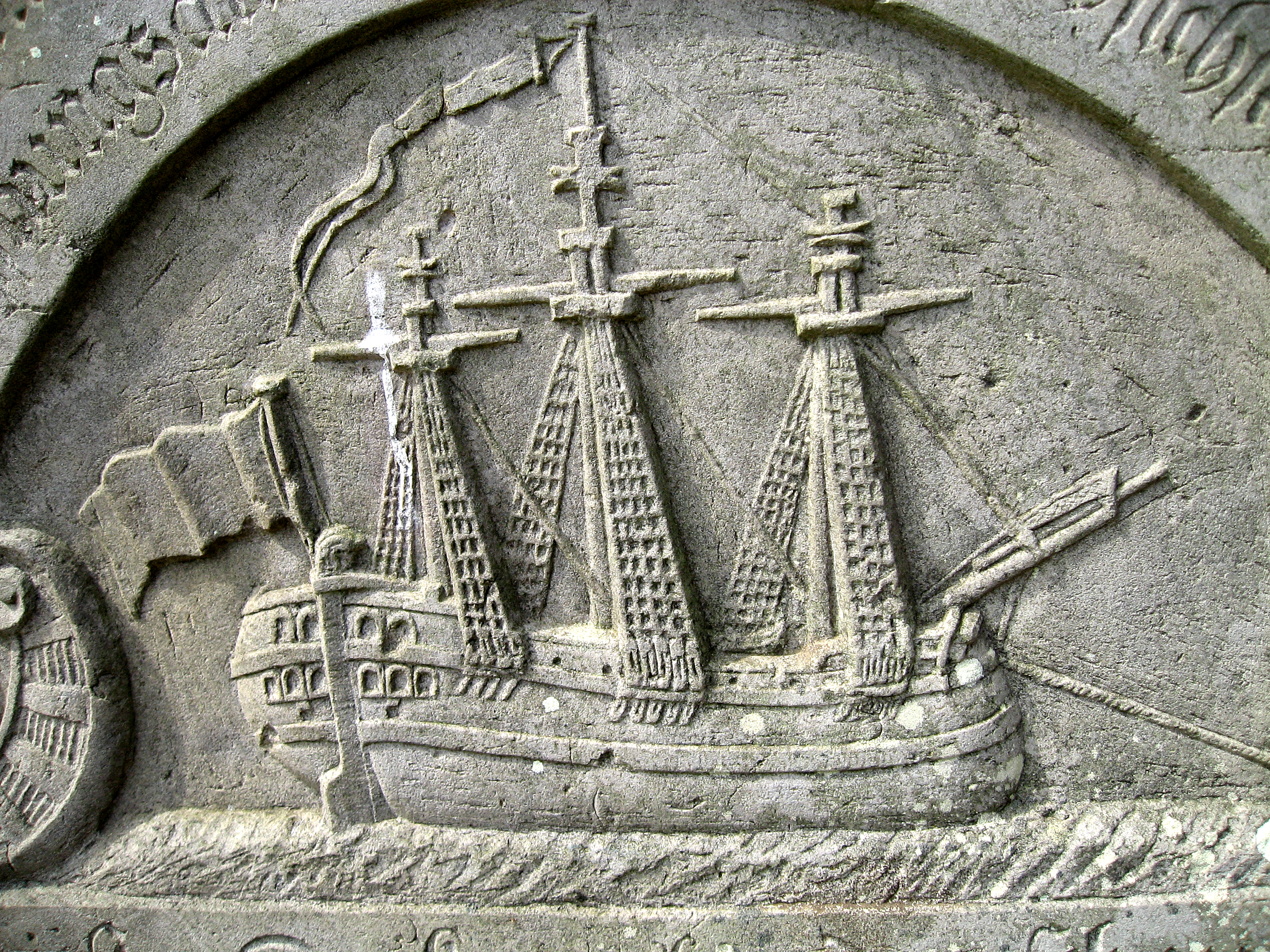
A sailor's tomb.

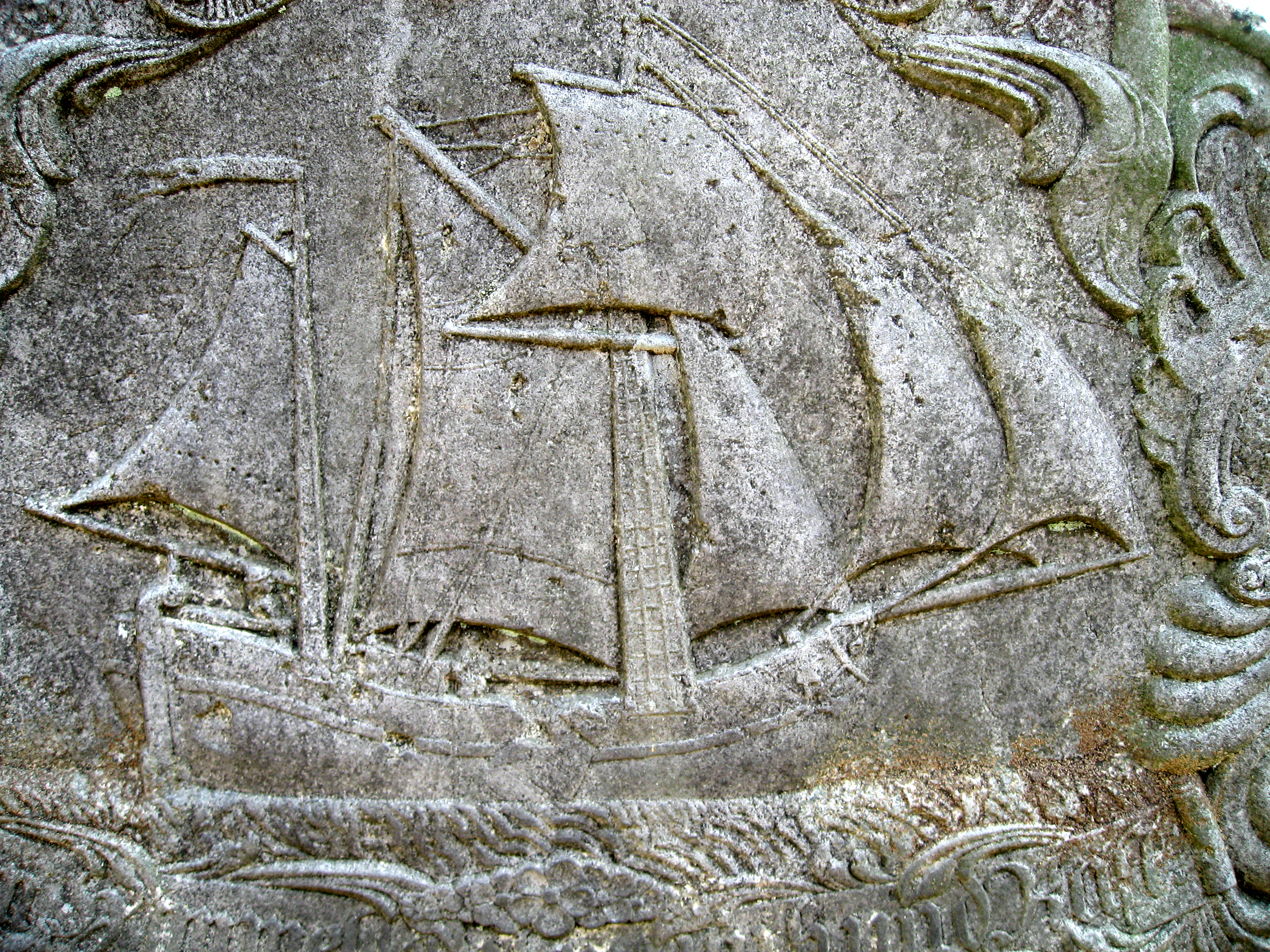
Another tomb.

== Economy ==
Tourism is the most important economical factor. In 2005, 35,470 guests were registered in the municipality of Nebel with 341,371 overnight stays. These numbers do not include patients and their company of the Satteldüne sanitorium.

== Notable people ==
- Hark Olufs (1708-1754), sailor from Süddorf. As a slave of the Bey of Constantine, Algeria, he advanced to the local cavalry's Commander in Chief.

== Trivia ==
Nebel is the municipality with the highest proportion of secondary residences in Schleswig-Holstein.
