= Amrum =

German island

Native name: Oomram
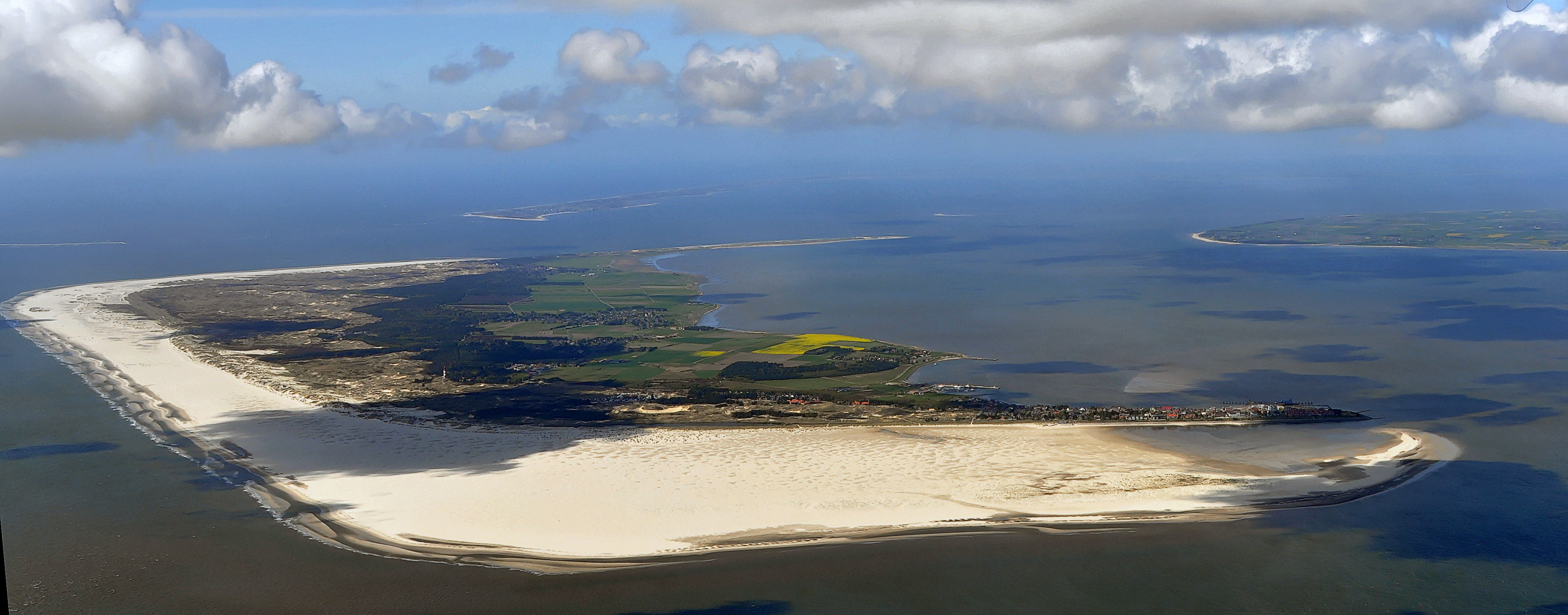
- Aerial view of Amrum

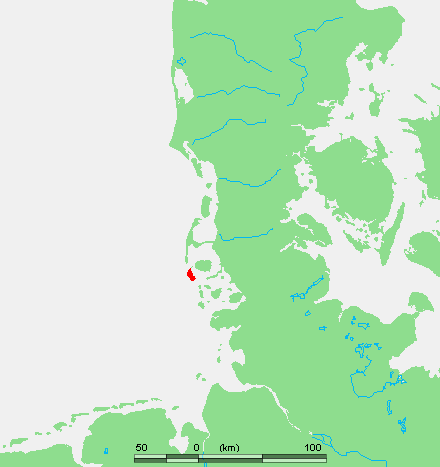

Geography
- Location: Wadden Sea
- Coordinates: 54°39′N 8°21′E
- Archipelago: North Frisian Islands
- Major islands: Sylt, Föhr, Amrum
- Area: 20.46 km^{2} (7.90 sq mi)
- Highest elevation: 32 m (105 ft)
- Highest point: Siatler

Administration
- Germany
- State: Schleswig-Holstein
- District: Nordfriesland

Demographics
- Population: 2,354 (2013)
- Pop. density: 111/km^{2} (287/sq mi)
- Ethnic groups: Germans, Frisians

Amrum (German pronunciation: [ˈamʁʊm]; Öömrang North Frisian: Oomram) is one of the North Frisian Islands on the German North Sea coast, south of Sylt and west of Föhr. It is part of the Nordfriesland district in the federal state of Schleswig-Holstein and has approximately 2,300 inhabitants.

The island is made up of a sandy core of geestland and features an extended beach all along its west coast, facing the open North Sea. The east coast borders to mudflats of the Wadden Sea. Sand dunes are a characteristic part of Amrum's landscape, resulting in a vegetation that is largely made up of heath and shrubs. The island's only forest was planted in 1948. Amrum is a refuge for many species of birds and a number of marine mammals including the grey seal and harbour porpoise.

Settlements on Amrum have been traced back to the Neolithic period when the area was still a part of the mainland of the Jutland peninsula. During the Middle Ages, Frisian settlers arrived at Amrum and engaged in salt making and seafaring. A part of the modern population still speaks Öömrang, a dialect of the North Frisian language, and Frisian traditions are kept alive.

With the island hosting many endangered species of plants and animals, its soil being largely unproductive for agriculture and as a popular seaside resort in general, Amrum's population today almost exclusively lives from the tourism industry.

== Geography ==
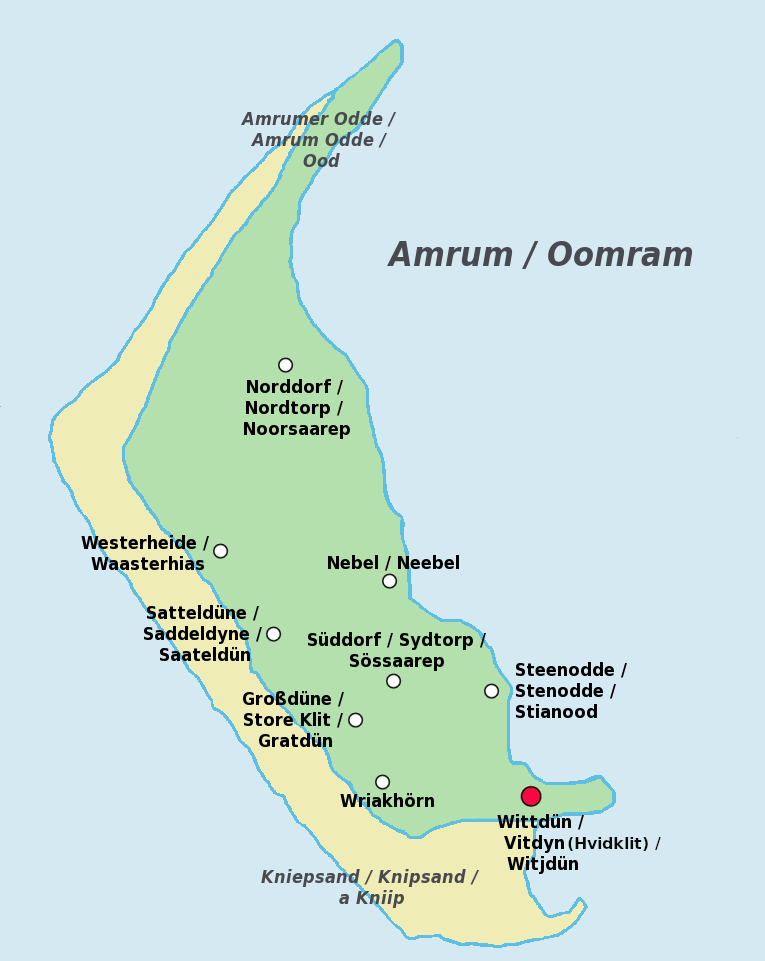
Map of Amrum (North Frisian, German and Danish place names)

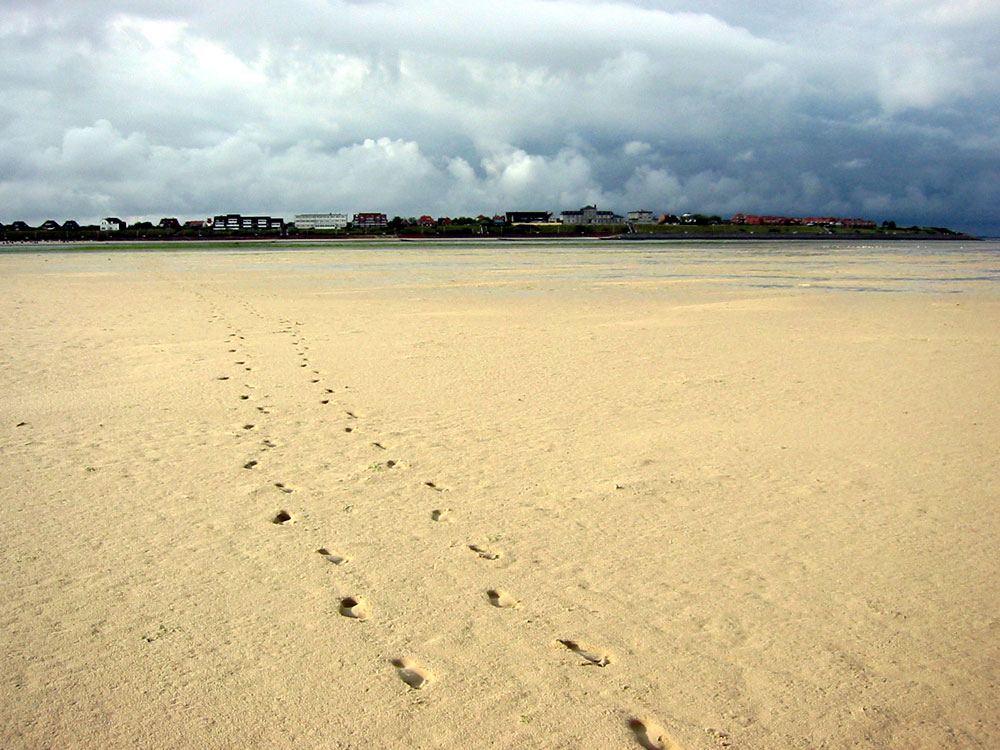
The Kniepsand beach

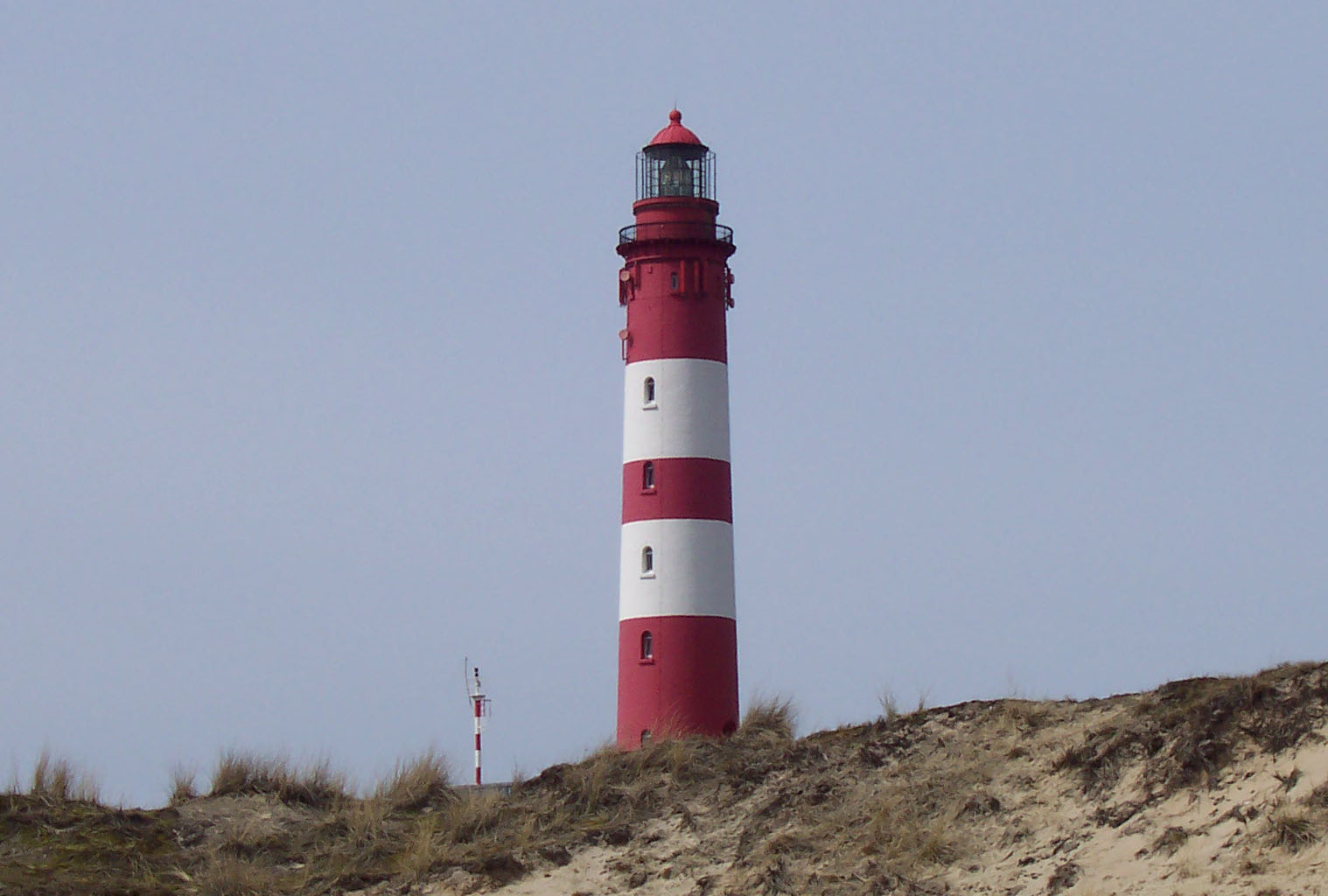
Amrum lighthouse

Amrum's area measures 20.4 km^{2}, making it the tenth-largest island of Germany (excluding Usedom which is partly Polish territory). Including the large Kniepsand beach on the western shore to the surface area results in a total area of c. 30 km^{2}. Amrum's surface area has however been subject to constant change due to land loss and gain caused by the sea. During the 19th century, a 20th part of the area recorded in the beginning of the century had been lost, but in 1913, a net gain was again recorded at the Kniepsand.

Amrum is one of three isles with a geestland core in Nordfriesland. This sandy core is made up of glacial deposits from the Saalian glacial period. To the east, it borders to the Wadden Sea mudflats of the North Sea. The east side is also where the island's historic hamlets are situated: Norddorf, Nebel, Süddorf and Steenodde. On the geestland core, one can find extended areas of heath and woodland which form a strip that runs along a north-south line on the axis. West of this woodland strip, a region of 838 hectares (2,070 acres) is covered with dunes that run all along the island for about 12 km. The maximal width of this area amounts to more than a kilometre. Amrum's tallest dune near Norddorf is called a Siatler (the settling dune); it reaches 32 m in height. Northward, the dune area extends into a small peninsula called Odde. In the south of Amrum, the newest settlement, Wittdün, is located. West of the dunes, the entire shore of Amrum is made up of the Kniepsand beach; it counts among northern Europe's largest sand beaches. North of Norddorf there is some marshland, another small marsh area can be found between Süddorf and Steenodde. Both of them are protected from the sea by dikes. During low tide it is possible to reach the neighbouring island of Föhr by mudflat hiking.

Amrum's population amounts to about 2,300 and the island is divided into three municipalities: Norddorf, Nebel and Wittdün. All are within the Amt Föhr-Amrum.

=== Villages ===
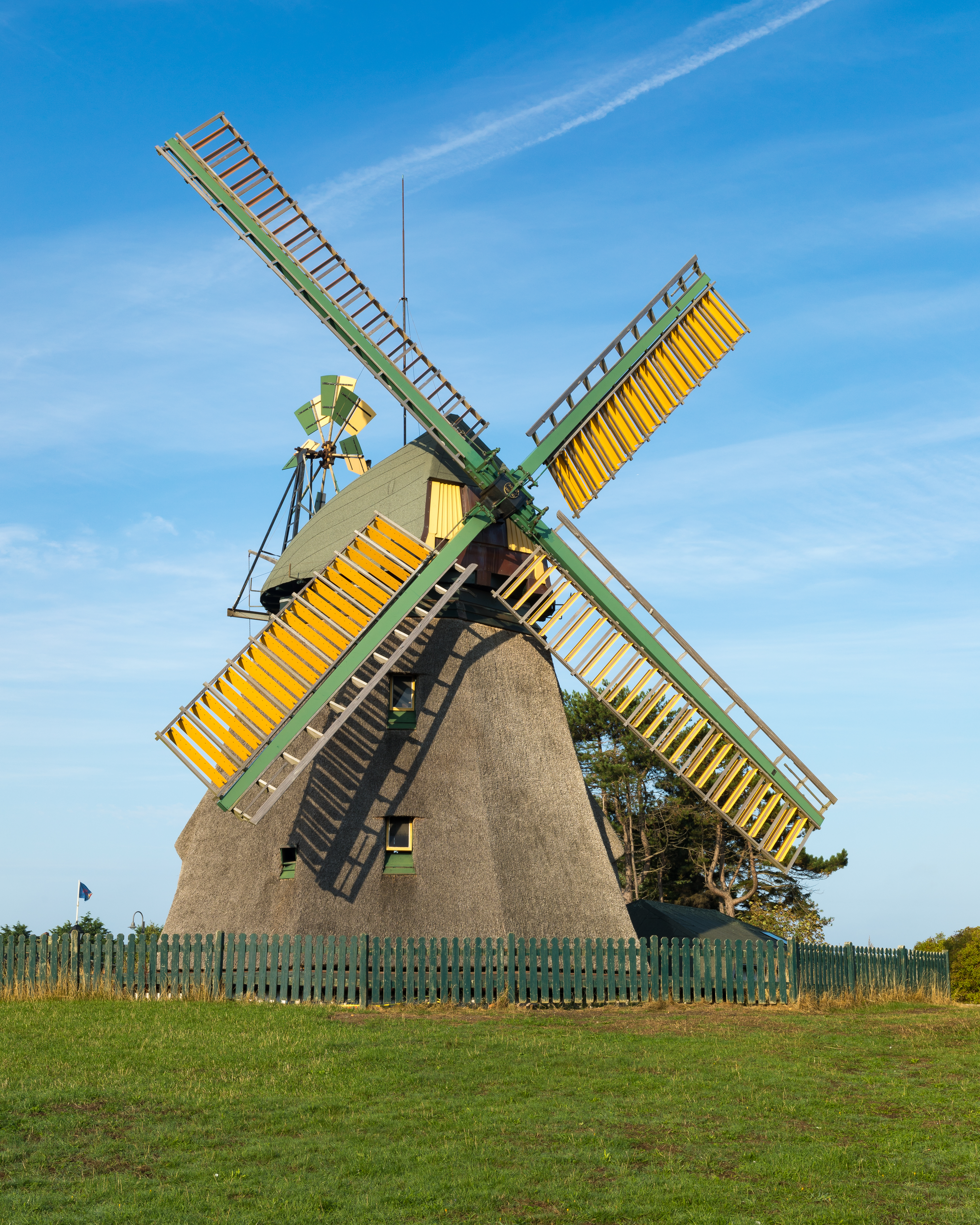
Amrum wind mill (2018)

The northernmost settlement is the seaside resort of Norddorf with a decoy pond and a sector light. Amrum's largest village, Nebel, is located near the eastern coastline. Notable sights there include the church of St. Clement with its "talking gravestones", the Öömrang Hüs - a museum of local history, a wind mill and the Cemetery of the Homeless. Süddorf, today a district of Nebel, is the island's oldest hamlet. The Amrum Lighthouse is located there. Steenodde, also a neighbourhood of Nebel, had long been Amrum's only port until Wittdün, founded 1890, had taken over as the island's major ferry terminal. Of the three municipalities, Wittdün is most clearly influenced by tourism.

== History ==
Historical population
Year	Pop.	±%
1821	578	—
1823	575	−0.5%
1824	586	+1.9%
1825	589	+0.5%
1826	595	+1.0%
1827	593	−0.3%
1828	589	−0.7%
1829	592	+0.5%
1830	595	+0.5%
1833	580	−2.5%
1860	642	+10.7%
1871	572	−10.9%
1890	698	+22.0%
1905	990	+41.8%
1927	1,164	+17.6%
1951	1,455	+25.0%
2013	2,354	+61.8%
2016	2,303	−2.2%

The oldest traces of settlements in the area date back to the Neolithic with a number of dolmens among them. Also many tomb sites from the Bronze and Iron Ages have been preserved. In the dunes west of the decoy pond, the remainders of an Iron Age hamlet have been found. It is unknown whether the Ambrones, who together with the Cimbri and Teutones threatened Rome around 100 BC, stemmed from this island which back then was still connected to the mainland by a land bridge. In the early Middle Ages the island was colonised by the Frisians. The oldest known record of Amrum island has been found in the Danish Census Book of King Valdemar II of Denmark from 1231.

Next to salt making, agriculture, fishery and whaling, merchant shipping was one of the main sources of income for a long time. Hark Olufs, a sailor from Süddorf who had been enslaved by Algerians in 1724, advanced to the rank of a General until he was allowed to return to his native island in 1736. During the late 19th century, tourism became a rapidly emerging business on Amrum and effectively changed the island's economy.

During the Middle Ages, Amrum, as well as all of North Frisia proper, belonged to the so-called Uthlande, the Outer Lands, which only successively became parts of the Danish realm or the Duchy of Schleswig. After the conflicts between the Danish kings and the counts of Schauenburg about the rule over Schleswig, Amrum and western Föhr became an enclave of Denmark and contrary to neighbouring areas, it was not any longer a part of the Duchy of Schleswig. This state endured until 1864, when Denmark lost Schleswig to Prussia after the Second Schleswig War. For a brief period after that war, Amrum was ruled together by Prussia and Austria, yet in 1867 the island came under Prussian rule and was made a part of the province of Schleswig-Holstein. At first, Amrum formed a municipality within the district of Tondern. In 1920, the Schleswig Plebiscites resulted in a clear majority vote for Amrum staying with Germany, while Tondern fell back to Denmark. Until 1972, Amrum belonged to the Südtondern district which then merged into the newly created district of Nordfriesland.

During the 19th century, Amrum still had a considerably lower population than today. Church records from 1821 to 1833 show an average population of 587, a census in 1860 noted 642 inhabitants, and in 1871, the population had dropped to 571. Among other factors, the decrease owed to the fact that large parts of Amrum's population had emigrated — mainly to the United States. Today, more people with ancestors from Amrum live in the United States than there are on Amrum proper, and the connections between Amrum and the U.S. are still being cultivated.

Eventually, tourism began only to flourish on the island when a seaside resort was established in Wittdün in 1890, which also led to a rapid increase in population.

On 29 October 1998, the cargo ship Pallas ran aground off Amrum, causing a severe oil spill in the region.

== Language and culture ==
The main language on Amrum is German. The North Frisian language in the Öömrang dialect is spoken by roughly a third of the population. Those 800 Amrumers are all multilingual. Due to the isolated location of the islands, the North Frisian dialects developed so differently, that Öömrang can be understood by people from Föhr, yet is hardly recognisable for those from Sylt or mainland Nordfriesland. Many Amrumers moreover speak Low German, since it had been the language of the coastal sailors. Only a few people speak the Danish language.

Amrum's national costume for girls and women is coloured black and white and is amply decorated with silver ornaments. It is mostly worn on confirmation services or at tourist events.

There are two peculiar traditions on Amrum. On February 21 the Biakendai is celebrated, where a great bonfire is lit to dispel winter. On the occasion, people blacken each other's faces with soot. The festival originates from the old liturgical holiday of Cathedra Petri, which was originally celebrated on February 22. The custom is also popular in other North Frisian municipalities. On New Year's Eve the Hulken takes place, where groups of mostly young people dress up in costumes and walk from house to house to let others guess their true identity (similar to Halloween). Depending on their age, they are either treated with sweets or alcoholic drinks.

== Economy ==
Amrum's main branch of economy is tourism. In 2007 the island could provide 12,000 beds. In 2008 approximately 135,000 tourists and 1.3 million lodgings were registered.

Agriculture is also being practised on Amrum and the port hosts a single fisherman.

=== Media ===
The local newspaper is called Der Insel-Bote (The Island Courier) and published by the Schleswig-Holsteinischer Zeitungsverlag. It is the common paper for both Föhr and Amrum.

Moreover, Amrum was the set for many German cinematic and TV films, e.g. Tod auf Amrum (1998), Summer (2008), Murder on Amrum (2009), Black Island (2021), or Amrum (2025), as well as numerous crime novels.

== Notable people ==
- Hark Olufs (1708–1754), sailor
- Knut Jungbohn Clement (1803–1873), writer
- Georg Quedens (born 1934), photographer and non-fiction writer
- Hark Bohm (1939–2025), actor, author and film director

== Transport ==
The island is connected by ferry services to neighbouring Föhr and to the mainland at the harbour of Dagebüll. During the summer season, a fast passenger boat offers services between the ports of Hörnum on Sylt, the Hallig Hooge and the harbour of Strucklahnungshörn on Nordstrand. Amrum's terminal is located at Wittdün, the ferries are operated by Wyker Dampfschiffs-Reederei GmbH (W.D.R.). Most tourists will reach Amrum via Dagebüll. From there, the ferry journey takes 90 minutes on a straight route, but the more usual route via a stop at Wyk auf Föhr takes 120 minutes.

The ferry service to the Halligen and the mainland terminal of Schlüttsiel was terminated in 2019 because the port of Schlüttsiel has become too silted up for extended traffic.

On the island, the bicycle is the main means of transport next to cars; compared to other areas of Germany, Amrum provides an excellent network of bicycle routes. Numerous bicycle rental services exist for tourists. A bus service connects Norddorf, Nebel and Wittdün on an hourly schedule (every 30 minutes during the summer season). Like the ferries, the bus service is operated by W.D.R. A less common form of transport is mudflat hiking between Amrum and Föhr.

From 1893 to 1939, a railway service was operated on Amrum. There is no airstrip on the island because any plans to establish one have so far vehemently been opposed.

== Flora and fauna ==
Plants and wild animals on Amrum are marked by the proximity to the sea, but some also distinguish themselves by extreme rarity and a high ecological value worth of protection. This fact was acknowledged by the establishment of two nature reserves and Amrum's proximity to the Schleswig-Holstein Wadden Sea National Park.

=== Flora ===
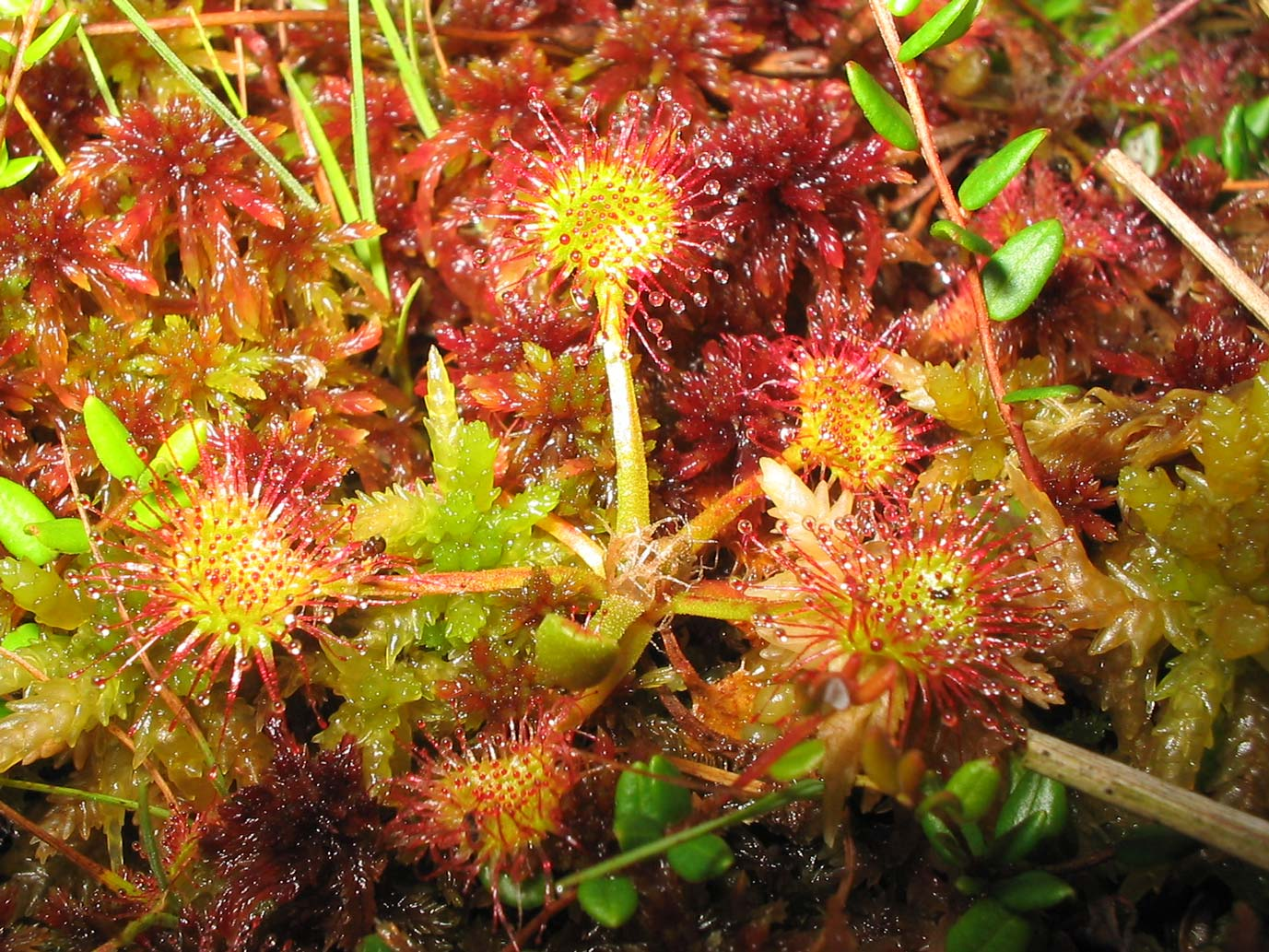
Common sundew

Amrum's vegetation is determined by the sea and by the different types of landscapes on the island, most of which are low in nutrients. In parts of the dune belt and on the Kniepsand marram grass or sea wormwood grow, as well as numerous other sand-loving plants like sheep's bit which will bloom in sheltered areas between the dunes. Also some stunted pines, bent by the sea wind, and Salix repens, the creeping willow can be found there. Until the 1970s, the rare sea holly could still be seen in the dunes.

East of there are heaths and conifer or mixed forests. In some dune slacks, peat bogs can be found which occasionally host the carnivorous plant common sundew. The once abundant marsh gentian vanished during the 1990s.

The Amrum forest was mainly planted in 1948 on an area of heath. Until then only a few forested regions could be found around the decoy ponds. With 180 hectares, Amrum has the largest ratio of forested land of all Germany's North Sea islands. Mainly pines, firs and birches can be found here. Meanwhile, the forest has largely lost its artificial nature. So one will encounter numerous plants on all levels and many species of fungi. The "geestland", east of the forest, is mostly used for farming. Its grassland grows plants such as Harebell (Campanula rotundifolia), Sea Thrift (Armeria maritima) and Carthusian Pink (Dianthus carthusianorum) and several species of hawkweed.

In the small marshlands, some sedges and the ragged robin may be seen. Here is the most nutritious soil on Amrum. Even the soil of Amrum's gardens is so low in nutrients that only a few sorts of plants, e.g. hollyhock, will grow there without fertilising.

On the salt marshes along the eastern shore of Amrum, many salt-tolerant species can be found. Pioneer plants such as Salicornia europaea and alkali grasses, grow on and stabilize the mudflats.

=== Fauna ===
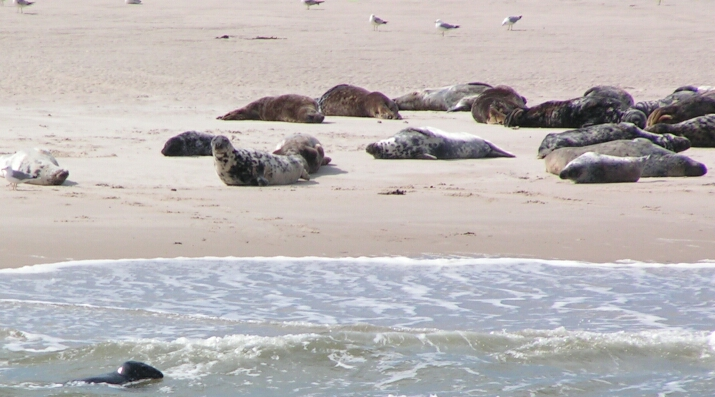
Grey seals on a sand bank near Amrum

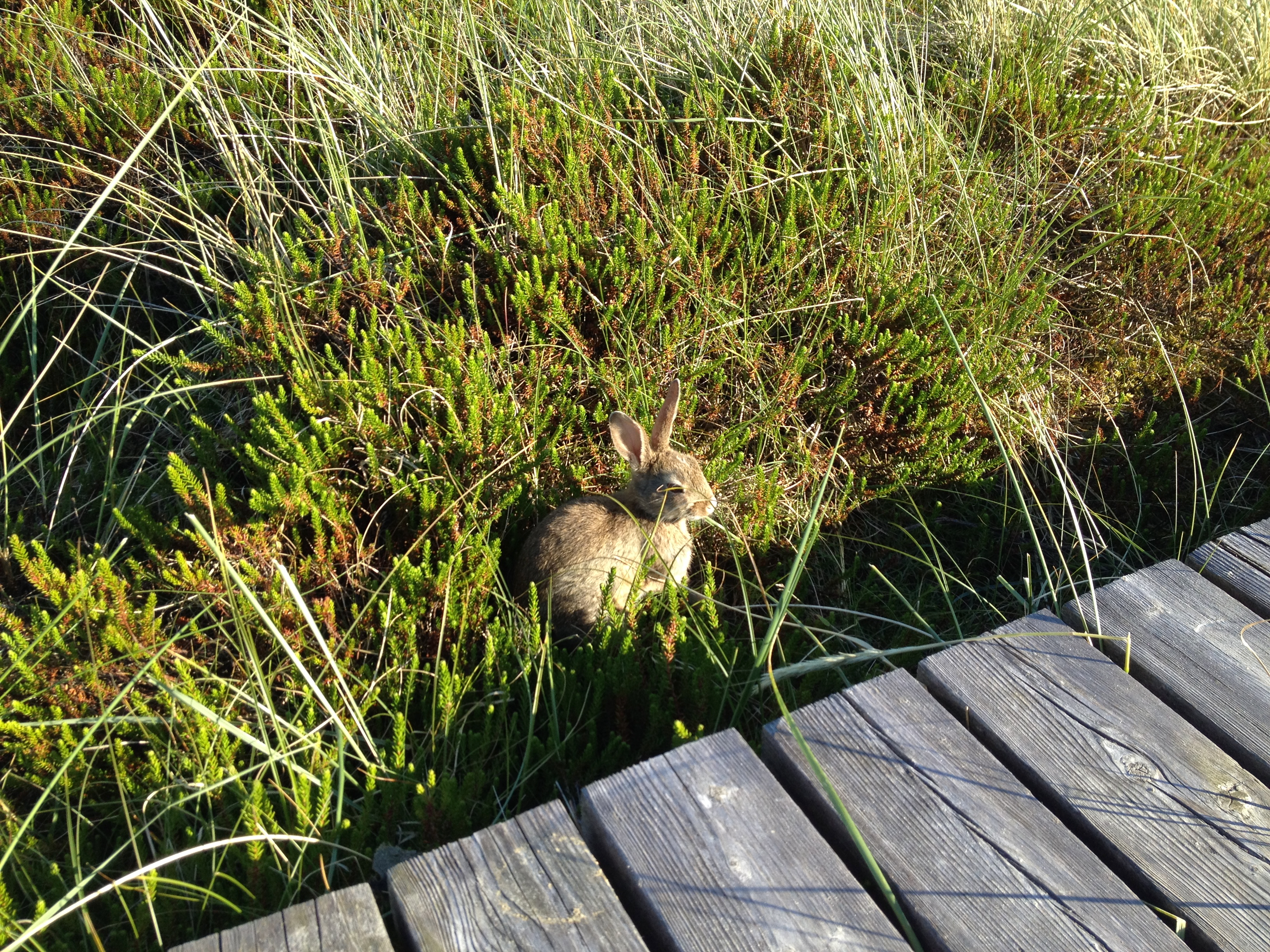
Rabbit sitting in dunes on Amrum

Like the vegetation, Amrum's wildlife is determined by the island's location within the North Sea. Thus there are only a few species of wild mammals on Amrum, such as hares, mice, hedgehogs and bats. In the 12th century, rabbits were introduced as game. Still today they populate the island. A few years ago a pregnant vixen was set free on Amrum. She and her offspring caused severe damage to the island's fauna, but since then they have been hunted down. In the sea and on the sand bars off Amrum, thus within the National Park, harbour seals, grey seals and harbour porpoises have their habitats. Occasionally in December and January, young grey seals are washed ashore on Amrum's beaches due to storm surges and are thereafter nursed by the adults. In January 2010 the seal shelter station at Friedrichskoog announced that more and more female grey seals were "moving away from less favourable birth sites near Amrum and Sylt to Heligoland."

Birdlife is particularly plentiful. Amrum counts among the most important hatching areas for seabirds in Germany. It is the only remaining hatching area for the Eurasian curlew in the Wadden Sea, and the main hatching region for the common eider, but also oystercatchers, shelducks, Arctic terns, seagulls like herring gulls, common gull and the lesser black-backed gull, as well as many other species, use to hatch there on the beach, in between the dunes or at the mudflats. Since the dunes of Amrum are a protected nature reserve, they are the only dunes along the west coast of Schleswig-Holstein where seagulls and ducks breed. In other dune areas of the North Sea coast these birds are usually scared off by tourists. Additionally vast flocks of migratory birds will rest on Amrum during the season, e.g. red knot, brent goose or sanderling, all of whom are able to find sufficient food along the coasts of Amrum. Moreover, a number of songbirds can be found and pheasants which were equally introduced as game are common.

Lizards and amphibians, such as moor frog, natterjack toad and smooth newt are other examples of land vertebrata.

In the sea surrounding Amrum numerous fish species typical of the North Sea can be found, like plaice and atlantic herring. A 1940 report mentioned several worms like Nematodes, Archiannelida, Oligochaeta and Turbellaria, crustaceans like ostracods, and ciliate protozoans in the sands of the Kniepsand beach. Since the 1980s, the abundance of harbour porpoises in the sea off Amrum and Sylt has been increasing and a protected marine area was created in 1999 to provide shelter for them.

The number of other marine species is equally great, the hermit crab, the common whelk, and the lugworm are all among them. Of them, mainly the sand shrimps are commercially used by "harvesting" them from the seabed with cutters. The shrimps are then sold as Nordsee-Krabben ("crabs"), which — though in strict taxonomical terms a misnomer — is their traditional culinary name along the German coast.

== See also ==
- Islands of Germany
- Frisian Islands
- Talking Gravestones of Amrum
