= Amrum Lighthouse =

Lighthouse in Schleswig-Holstein, Germany

Amrum Lighthouse Seefeuer Amrum
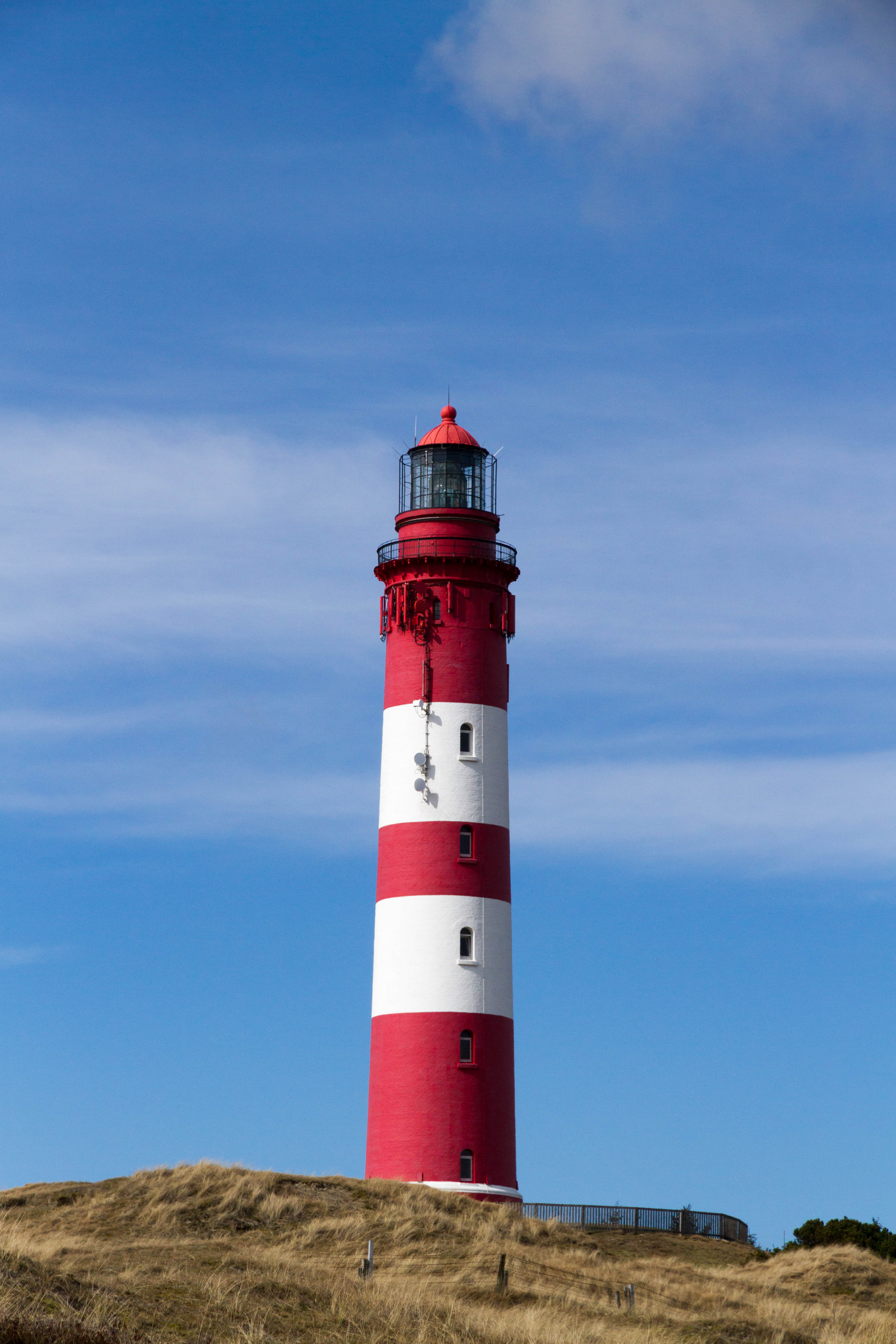
- Location: Amrum, Germany
- Coordinates: 54°37′52.24″N 8°21′16.91″E

Tower
- Constructed: 1875
- Construction: granite tower
- Automated: 1984
- Height: 41 metres (135 ft)
- Shape: tapered cylindrical tower with balcony and lantern
- Markings: red tower with two horizontal white bands, red lantern
- Operator: WSA Tönning
- Heritage: Heritage monument in Schleswig-Holstein

Light
- Focal height: 63 metres (207 ft)
- Lens: First order Fresnel lens
- Range: 23 nautical miles (43 km; 26 mi)
- Characteristic: Fl W 7.5s

The Amrum Lighthouse is located in the southern part of the German island of Amrum, approximately 2 kilometres west of the village of Wittdün, yet still adhering to the municipality of Nebel. Its name in German is Seefeuer Amrum. The lighthouse is one of the island's landmarks, being open to the public during the summer season.

== Data ==
The focal plane height of the lightsource measures 63 metres above mean sea level and thereby it is one of the highest lights along the German North Sea shore. The tower itself is 41.8 metres tall, which makes its top reach 67.4 metres above msl. The range of the white sector amounts to 23.3 nautical miles.

The lens is made up of 16 panels of converging lenses. The light character is "Fl, 7.5s", i.e. a single flashing light with an interval of 7.5 seconds. A 230 V/250 V halogen metal vapour lamp is used as lantern.

== History ==
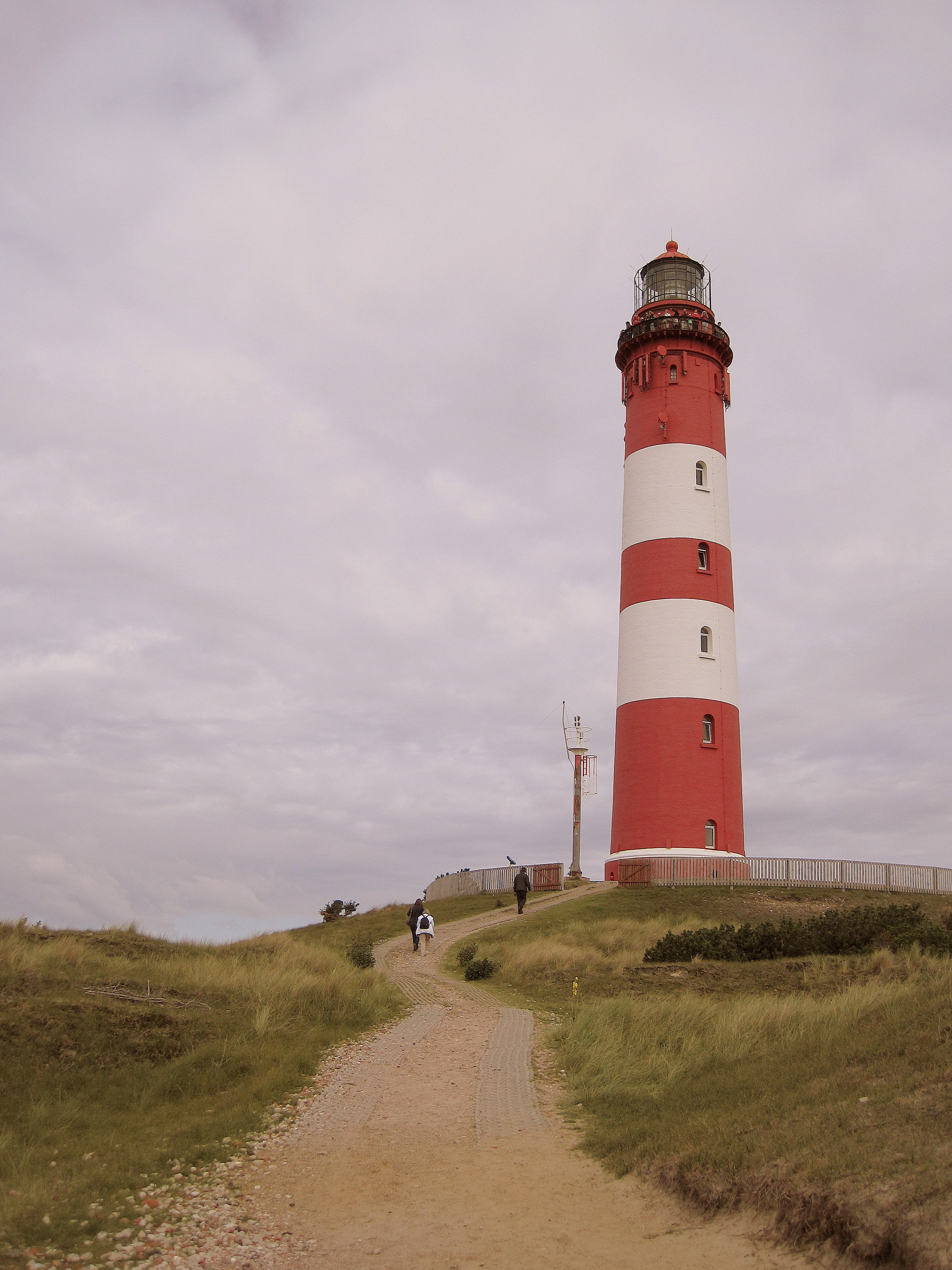
Amrum Lighthouse

An article on the loss of three vessels around the islands of Amrum and Sylt, published in the Hamburger Zeitung in 1868, sparked a controversial debate among experts about where to build a lighthouse in the area. In 1872 it was decided that a lighthouse be built atop a 25 metres high dune on Amrum. Constructions were taken up in 1873 but turned into an obstacle course for all those involved.

=== Construction and activation ===
After five weeks only, the construction works had to be halted when the granite stones for the spiral stairs were missing. When the shipment arrived, a number of workers went on strike and refused to set foot on the "dull" island. Yet the remaining workers and some additional auxiliary hands were able to finish the brick building until November 1874, and to install the first order Fresnel lens with its Argand lamp of five wicks. The lens had been displayed at the Paris Exposition in 1867. Also, a dwelling house was built below the dune to host three lighthouse keepers.

The "Amrum Wittdün Lighthouse" (Leuchtfeuer Amrum Wittdün) was officially activated on 1 January 1875, shortly before sunset. It was the first German lighthouse to be erected in Nordfriesland. In 1936, the lantern was electrified and only in 1952 the lighthouse received its red and white marking. The last keeper left the lighthouse in 1984 when the facility had become automated.

=== The optic ===
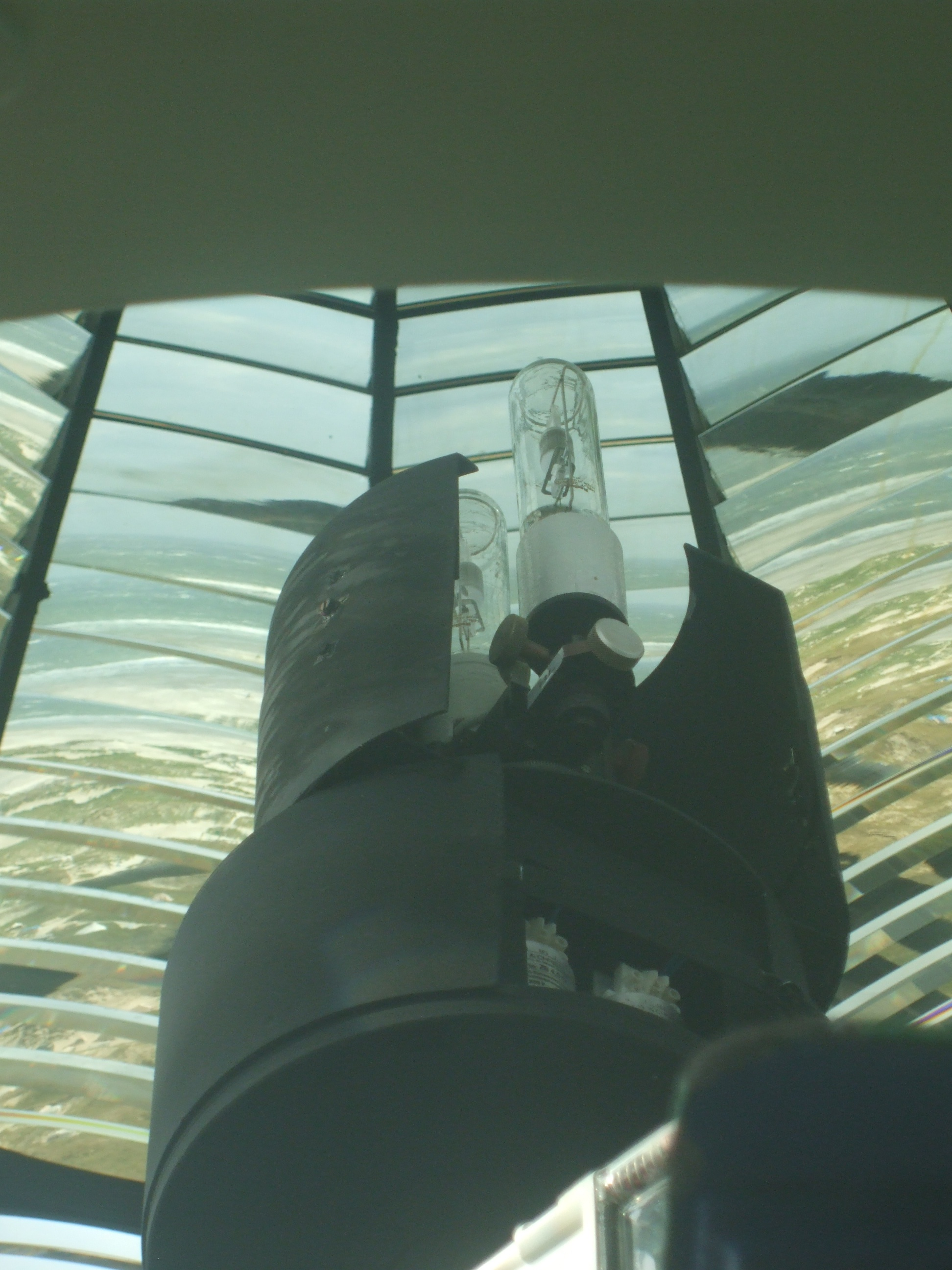
Lens and lamp as seen from inside the lantern room

The 2.7 metres tall optic with a weight of 2.9 tonnes is extremely precious. Its current value is put at five million Euro. Some parts have – compared to today's standards – extremely high durability. For example, a ball-bearing which carried the entire optic had to be changed only in 1993, 118 years after the lighthouse's activation.

== In popular culture ==
Amrum Lighthouse was featured on two German stamps by Deutsche Post in 2005 and 2008.

== See also ==
- List of lighthouses in Germany
