= Wittdün =

Wittdün Witjdün / Vitdyn
- Municipality
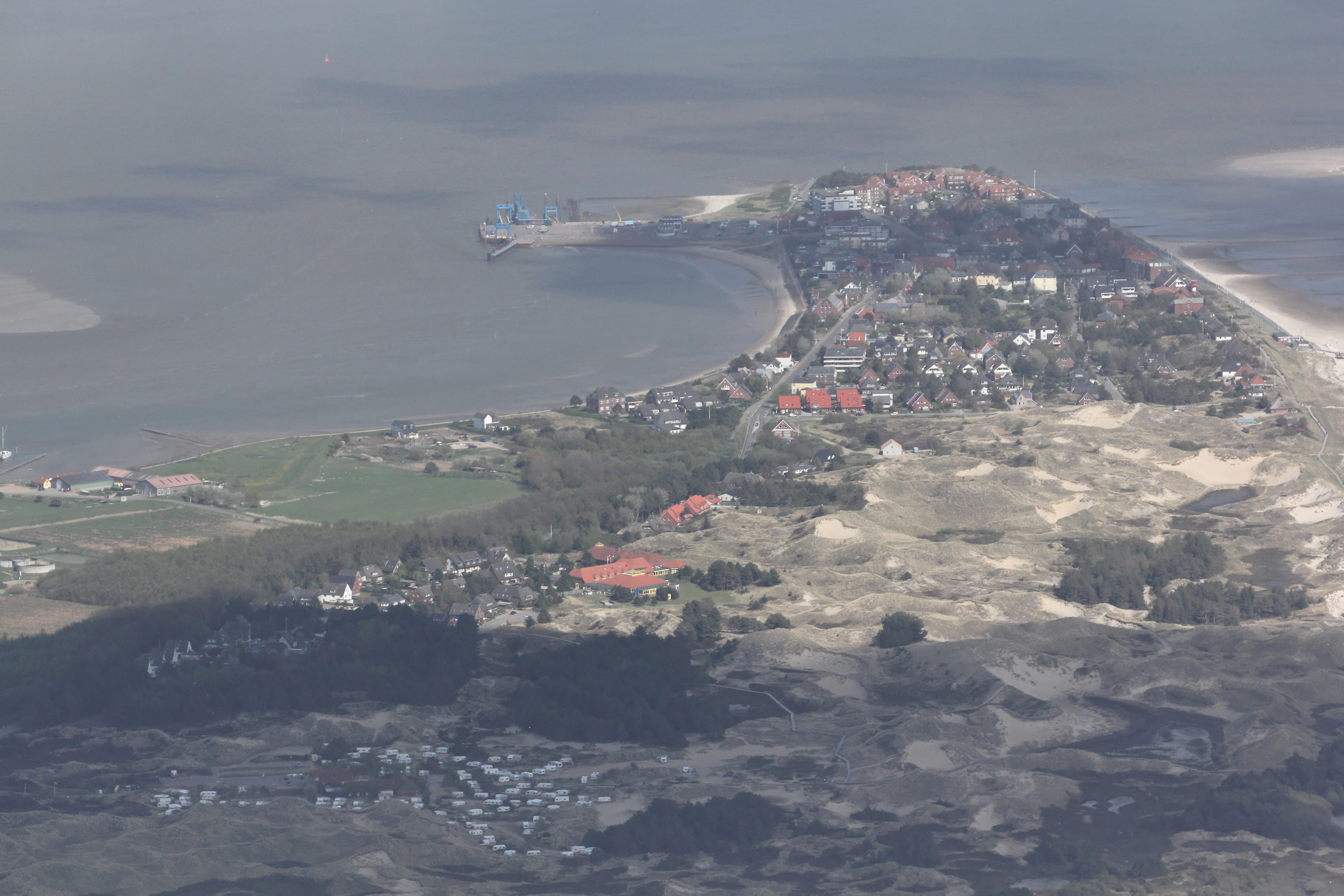

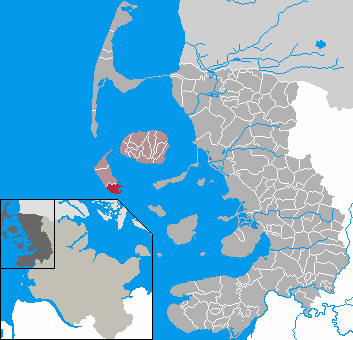
- Location of Wittdün; Witjdün / Vitdyn within Nordfriesland district
- Interactive map of Wittdün; Witjdün / Vitdyn
- Location within Germany Location within Schleswig-Holstein
- Coordinates: 54°38′N 8°24′E
- Country: Germany
- State: Schleswig-Holstein
- District: Nordfriesland
- Municipal assoc.: Föhr-Amrum

Government
  - Mayor: Jürgen Jungclaus

Area
  - Total: 2.6 km^{2} (1.0 sq mi)
- Elevation: 0 m (0 ft)

Population (2025-12-31)
  - Total: 739
  - Density: 280/km^{2} (740/sq mi)
- Time zone: UTC+01:00 (CET)
  - Summer (DST): UTC+02:00 (CEST)
- Postal codes: 25946
- Dialling codes: 04682
- Vehicle registration: NF
- Website: www.amt-foehr-amrum.de

Wittdün (Öömrang: Witjdün, Danish: Vitdyn, also Hvidklit) is a municipality on the island of Amrum in the district of Nordfriesland in Schleswig-Holstein, Germany.

== History ==
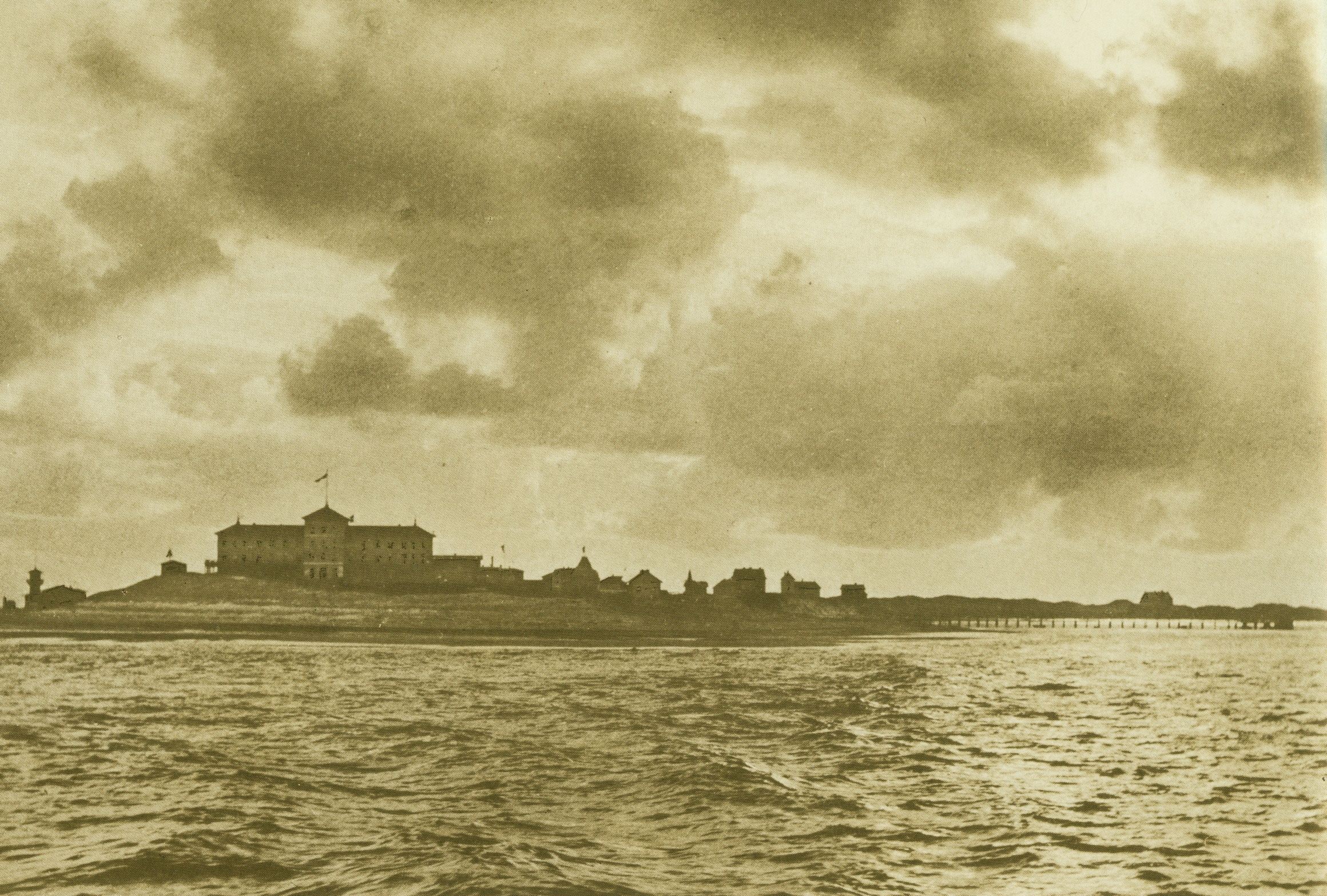
View of Wittdün in 1895.

Unlike the other villages of Amrum, Wittdün is a relatively young settlement. It was founded in 1890 as a seaside resort next to a new ferry port connecting the island to mainland Nordfriesland. The reason for founding this new village was the fear of many islanders of a decline of their Frisian culture due to the influx of tourists from the south. So, many Amrumers thought that concentrating the emerging seaside tourism in a single village would protect the local community from malign influences.

Until December 31, 2006, the Wittdün municipality, together with Nebel and Norddorf formed the Amt Amrum.

== Politics ==
Since the municipal elections of 2008, the Wittdüner Bürgerblock holds five seats of Wittdün's council, the CDU holds two.

== Economy ==
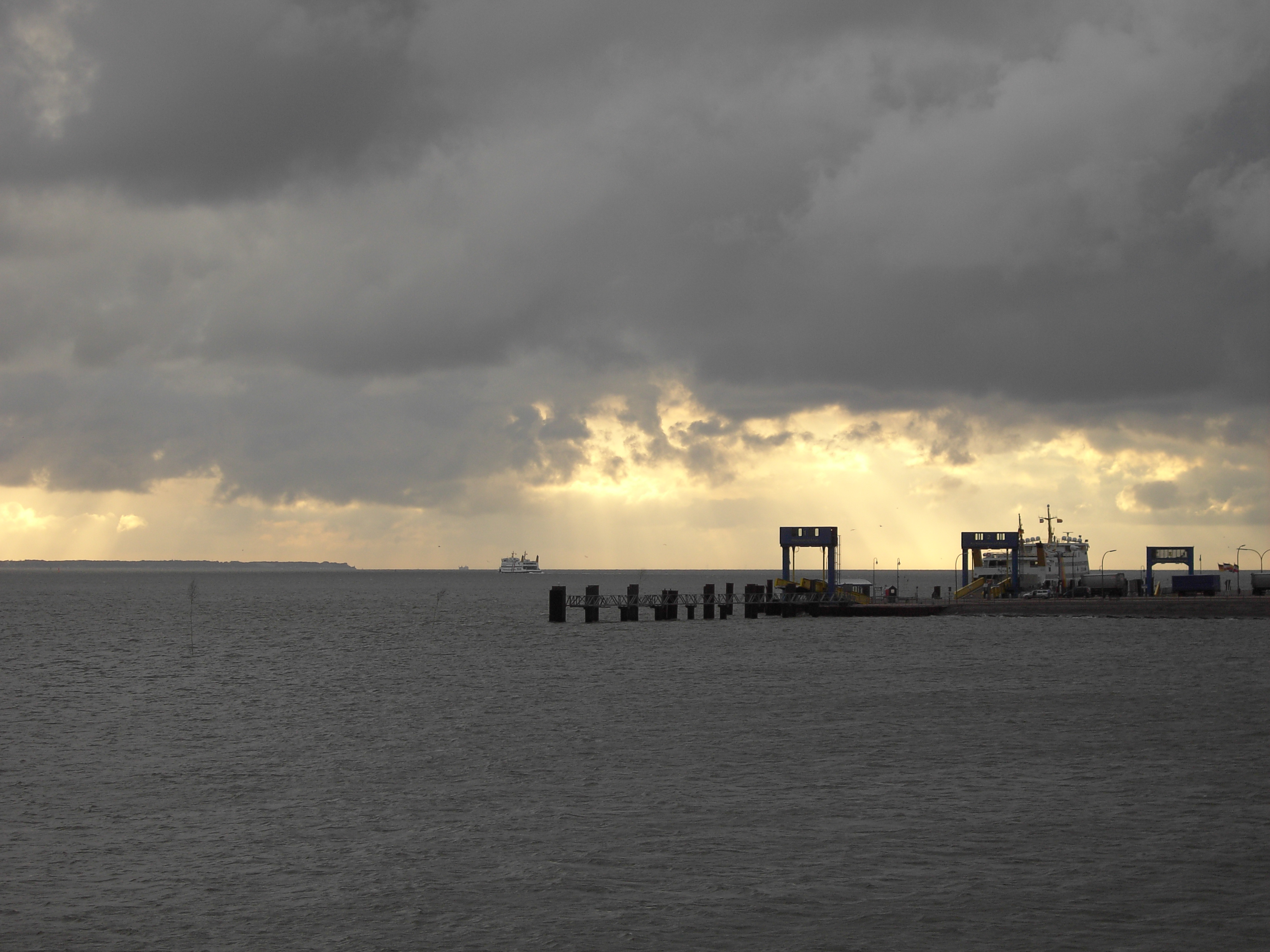
The ferry terminal.

Wittdün is a seaside resort, tourism is the main source of income. In 2005, 374,000 lodgings were registered. There is a sea water swimming pool and a centre for thalassotherapy. Moreover, Amrum's youth hostel is located in Wittdün. The village hosts Amrum's only ferry terminal.
