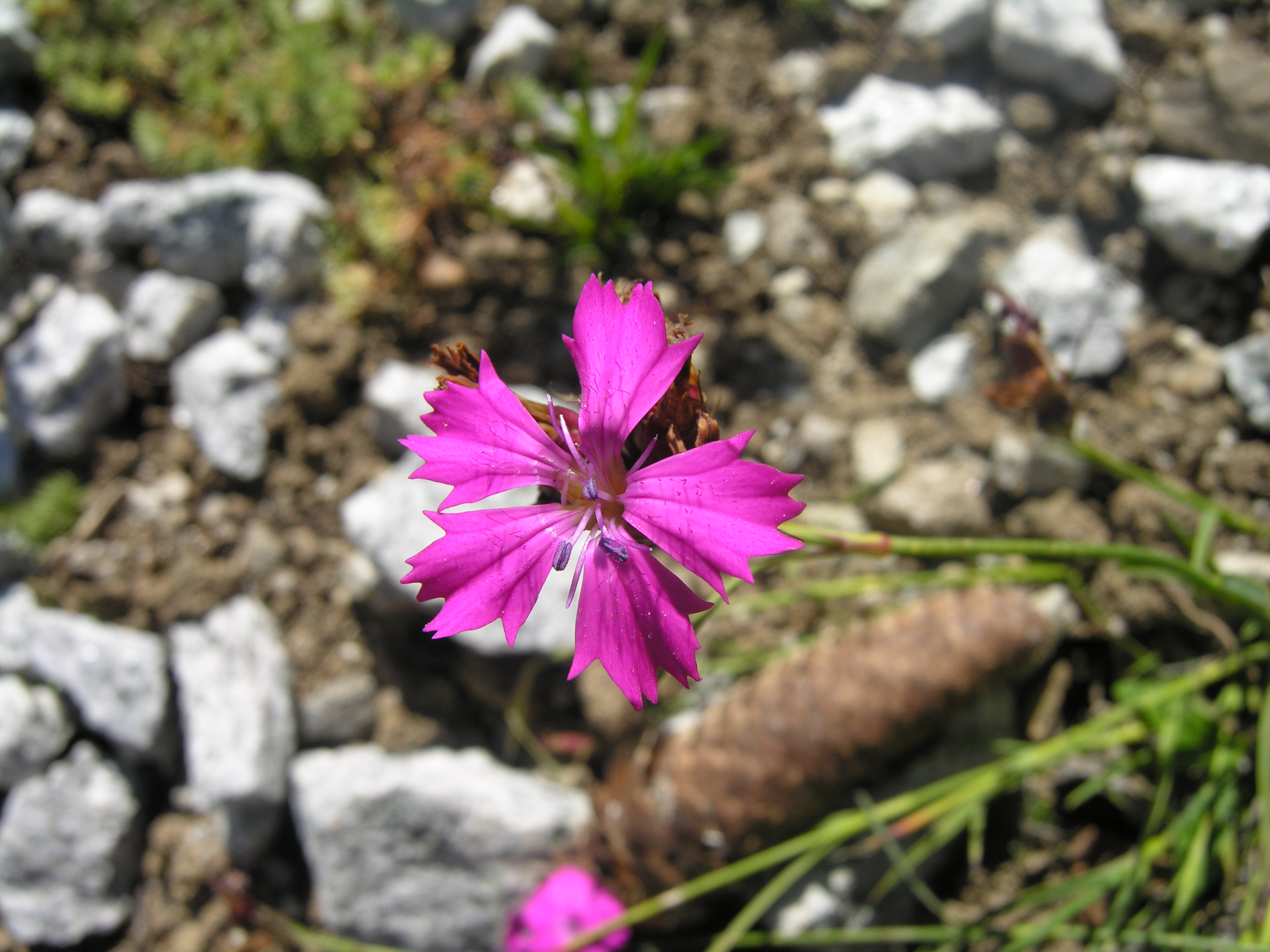

Scientific classification
- Kingdom: Plantae
- Clade: Tracheophytes
- Clade: Angiosperms
- Clade: Eudicots
- Order: Caryophyllales
- Family: Caryophyllaceae
- Genus: Dianthus
- Species: D. carthusianorum

Binomial name
- Dianthus carthusianorum L.

= Dianthus carthusianorum =

Species of plant

Dianthus carthusianorum (Caryophyllaceae), commonly known as Carthusian pink or Clusterhead pink, belongs to the genus Dianthus and is native to Europe. It is a variable herbaceous perennial plant growing to 60 cm (24 in) tall.

== Description ==
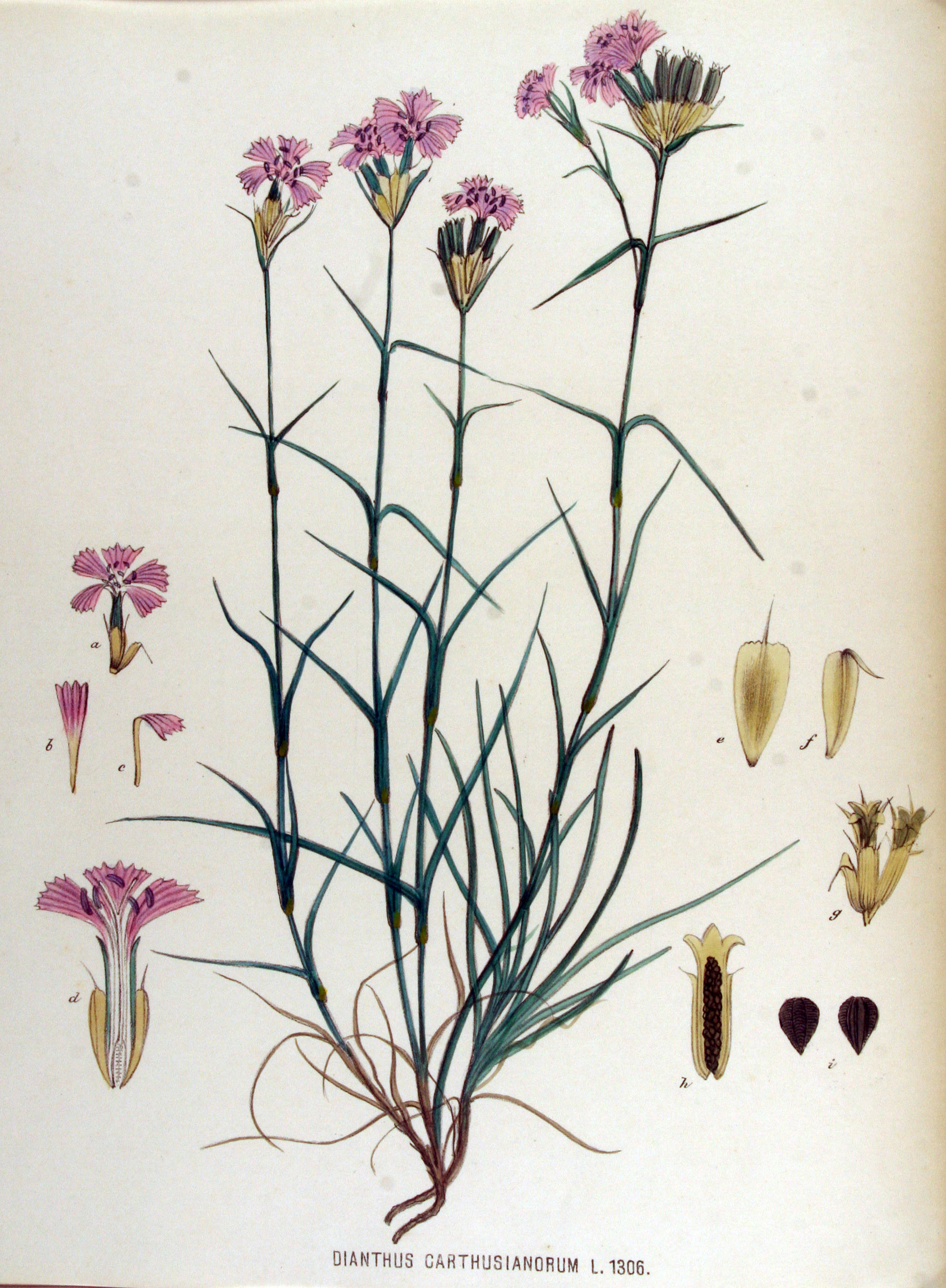
Botanical drawing of Dianthus carthusianorum.

Plants usually grow in small dense clusters with many stems, some of which are sterile. Stems are erect, unbranched or sometimes branched at the base. Leaf blades are linear, to spatulate and 3-7 cm long occasionally reaching length of 13 cm. They are green to slightly glaucous greyish-green and possess glabrous margins. The lower part of the leaf wraps around the stem and is described as leaf sheath, which is 8-18 mm long and 3-8 times as long as the stem diameter.

Side view of a flower.

Flowers are grouped into dense, head-like clusters, which is why this species is also known as Clusterhead pink. These inflorescences usually contain 4-15 flowers, which are further surrounded by bracts which can be green and leaf-like or brown, dry and papery. Bracts end in an arista/awn. Sepals are fused to form the calyx tube characteristic for many Caryophyllaceae, it is 10-15 mm long, hairless, marked by 40-45 longitudinal ribs and at the top divided into 3-4 mm long oval lobes. The five clawed petals can be deep pink, to scarlet or purple; have tufts of tiny hairs towards their base and tooth-like projections on the outward facing part. After flowering 8-10 mm long fruits are forming as capsule which release many 1.6-2 mm long seeds after maturation.

Chromosome numbers are 2n = 30 and 2n = 60.

== Distribution ==
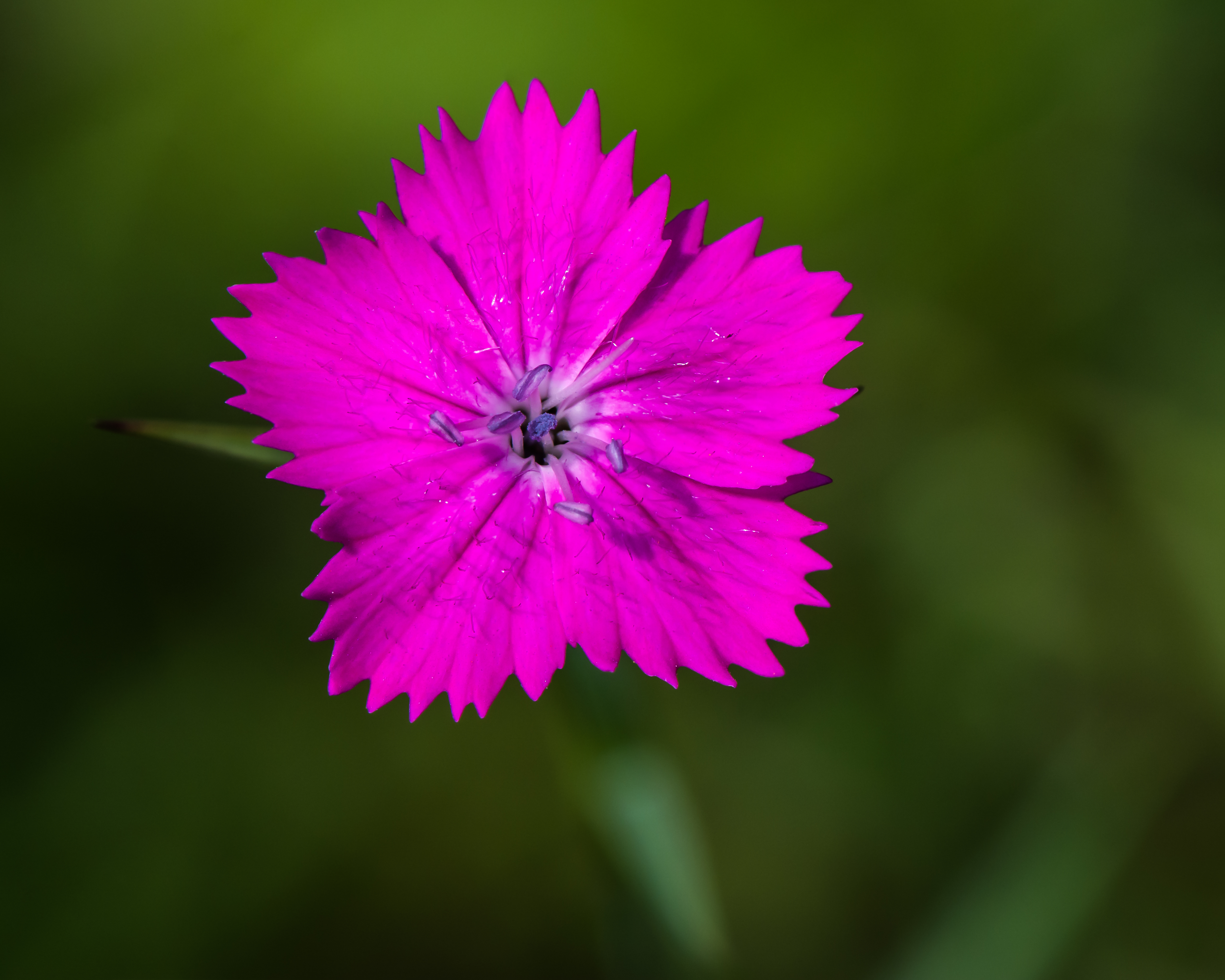
Dianthus carthusianorum flower.

Dianthus carthusianorum is native to Europe, with a distribution range from central/northern Spain and Italy in the south; to southern Denmark, Germany and Poland in the north and to Bulgaria, Romania and Ukraine in the east. It is considered to be introduced in Sweden, Great Britain, Turkey and the US.

Plants are occurring between June and October in dry, grassy habitats at altitudes of up to 2,500 m (8,200 ft) often in mountains.

== Taxonomy ==
The name Dianthus carthusianorum was first published by Carl Linnaeus in 1753 in Species Plantarum.

Since Dianthus carthusianorum is a very variable species several subspecies have been described by multiple authors. The Global Biodiversity Information Facility (GBIF) currently recognizes ten subspecies:

Flowers of Dianthus carthusianorum subsp. sanguineus.

- Dianthus carthusianorum subsp. atrorubens
- Dianthus carthusianorum subsp. capillifrons
- Dianthus carthusianorum subsp. carthusianorum
- Dianthus carthusianorum subsp. latifolius
- Dianthus carthusianorum subsp. polonicus
- Dianthus carthusianorum subsp. puberulus
- Dianthus carthusianorum subsp. sanguineus
- Dianthus carthusianorum subsp. sudeticus
- Dianthus carthusianorum subsp. tenorei
- Dianthus carthusianorum subsp. tenuifolius

== Gallery ==
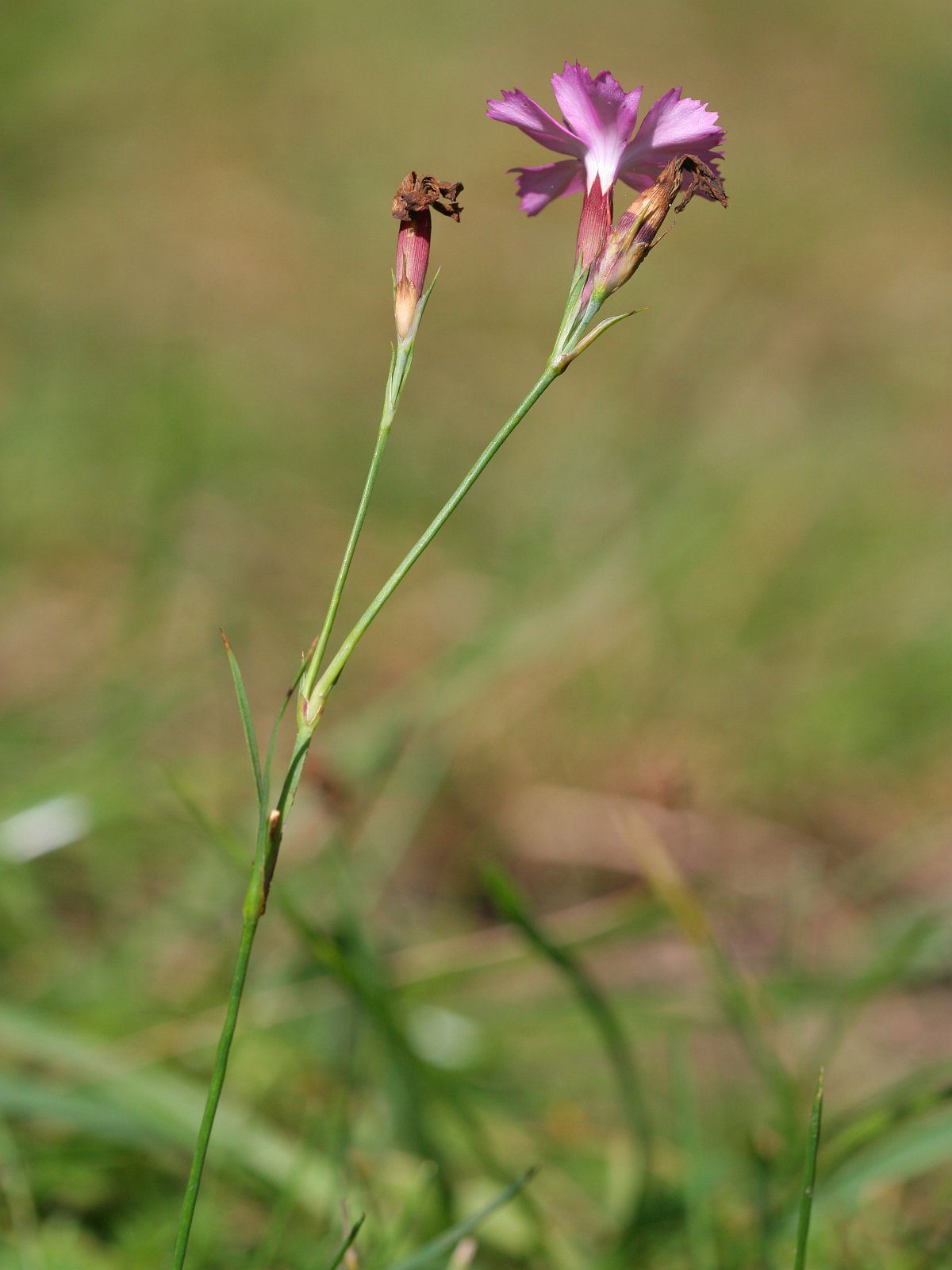
subsp. carthusianorum

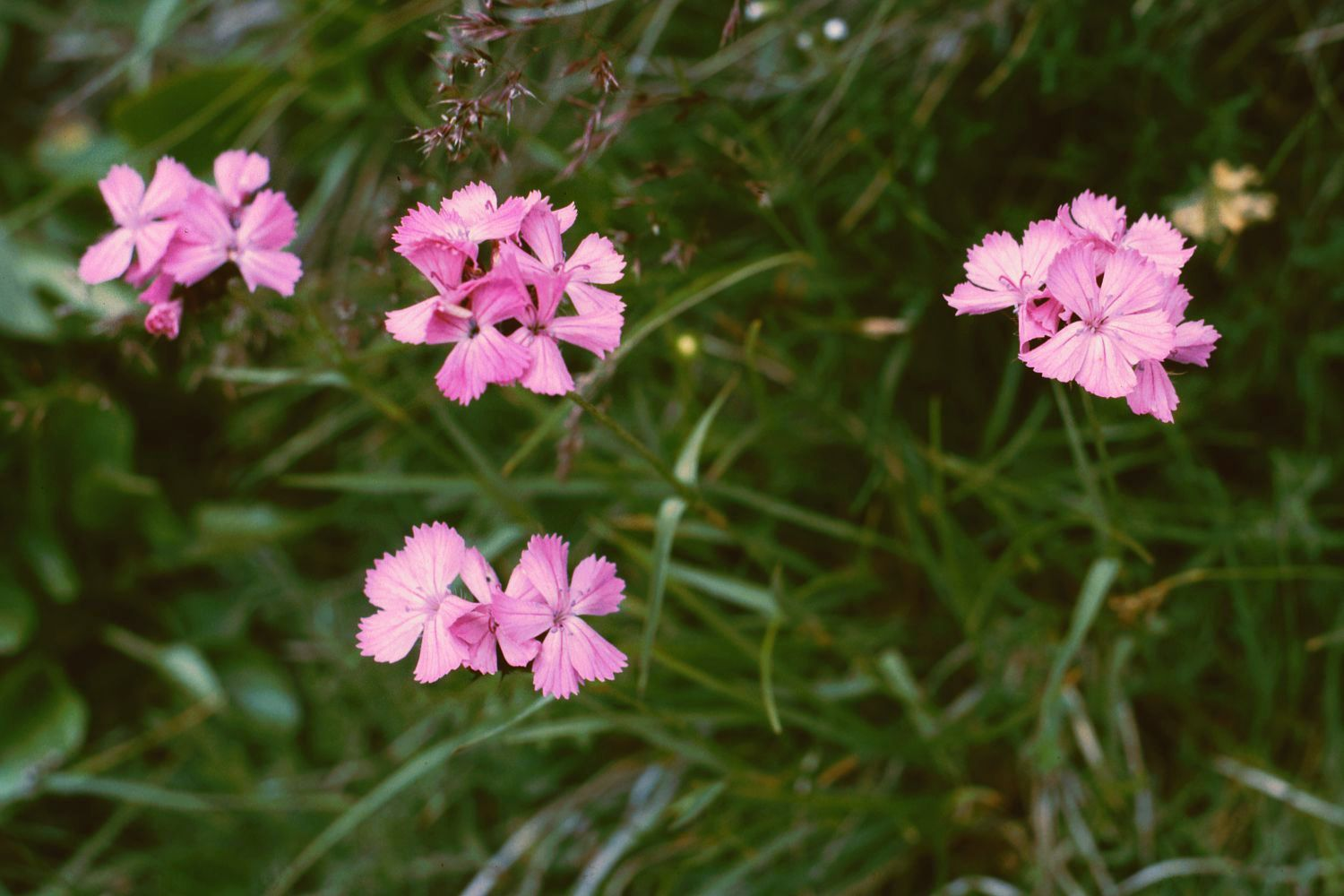
subsp. alpestris

Inflorescence

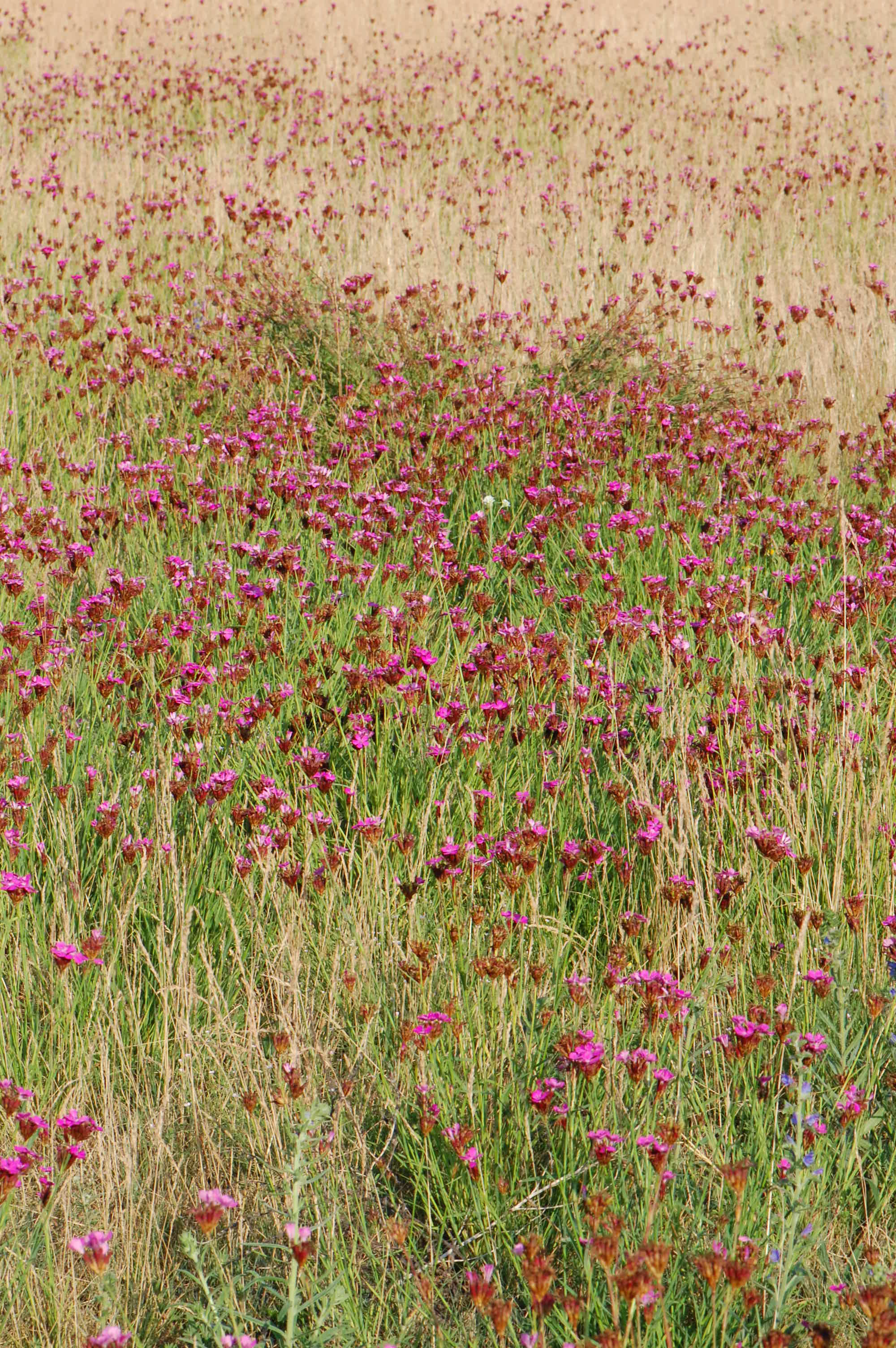
Dianthus carthusianorum ssp. carthusianorum habit close to Berlin.

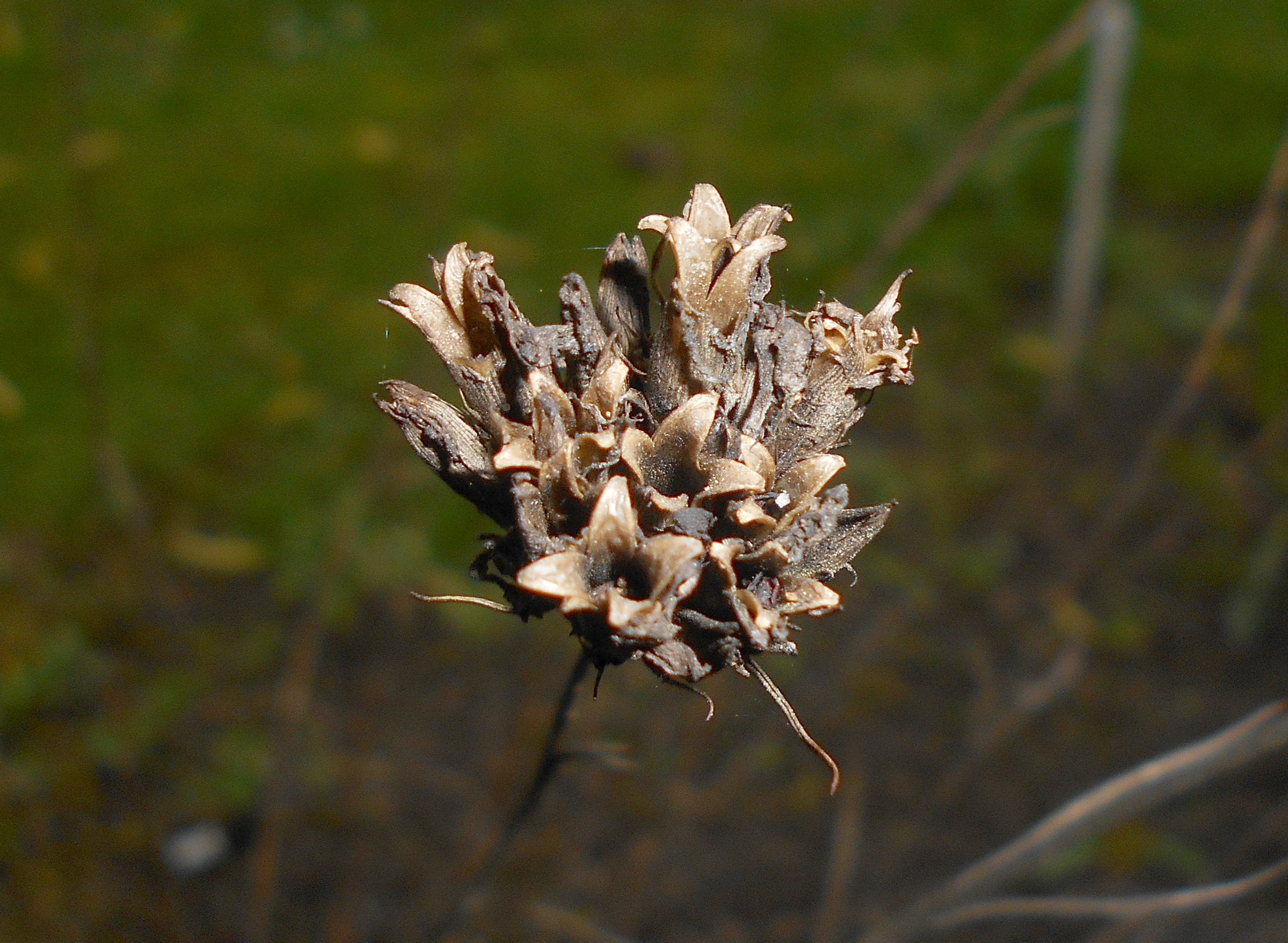
Capsule fruits in mature inflorescence.
