= Knut Jungbohn Clement =

Danish linguist (1803–1873)

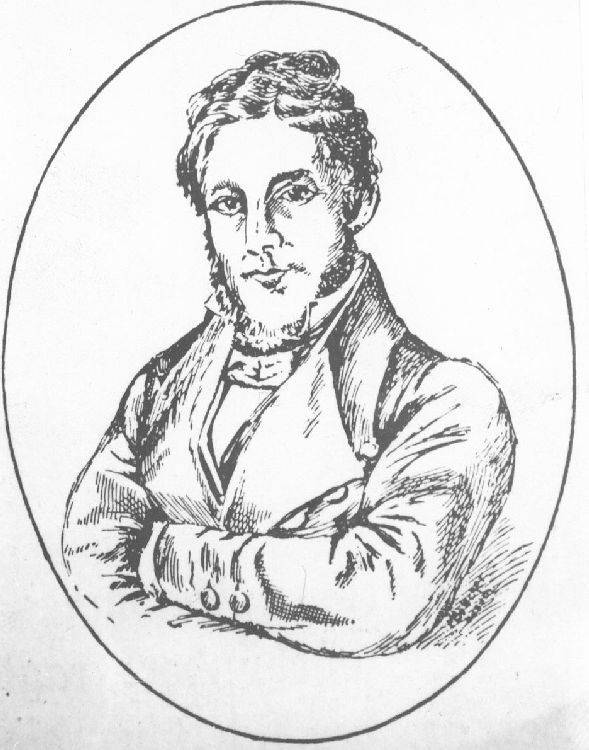
- Born: 4 December 1803; Amrum, Denmark
- Died: 7 October 1873 (aged 69); Bergen, New Jersey, US

Academic work
- Discipline: linguistics
- Institutions: University of Kiel

Knut Jungbohn Clement (born 4 December 1803 in the island of Amrum, Denmark – 7 October 1873 in Bergen, New Jersey) was a Danish linguist.

== Biography ==
He was educated at Kiel and Heidelberg, and became PhD in 1835. At the expense of the Danish government he made a three years' tour through Great Britain and continental Europe, and on his return to Denmark became a professor in the University of Kiel, and delivered before large and enthusiastic classes lectures on history, politics, economy, and criticism. He had taken an active part in the question of the Schleswig-Holstein duchies, and in 1866, when they were given up in consequence of the Austro-Prussian War, he emigrated to the United States.

== Works ==
Clement published works on historical, linguistic, critical, and political subjects. Among them were:

- Origin of the Teutons (Altona, 1836)
- Introduction to the History of Denmark (Hamburg, 1839)
- The North German World (Copenhagen, 1840)
- The Salic Law (Mannheim, 1843)
- Travels in Ireland (Kiel, 1845)
- History of Friesland's Life and Sorrows (1845)
- Shakespeare's ‘Tempest’ Historically Illustrated (Leipzig, 1846)
- Journey through Holland and Germany (1847)
- The French and their Language (1848)
- The Best Means of Ameliorating the Condition of the Duchies of Sleswick and Holstein (Altona, 1848)
- The True Condition of the Language and Nationality of South Jutland (Hamburg, 1849)
