= Schleswig-Holsteinischer Zeitungsverlag =

German newspaper publisher

Schleswig-Holsteinischer Zeitungsverlag ("Schleswig-Holstein Newspaper publisher"), sh:z, is a newspaper group based in Flensburg, Schleswig-Holstein. With 22 daily newspapers, the group is the largest daily publisher in the state. sh:z's publications have a circulation of over 150,000 with readership of about half a million people. The website SHZ.de carries news stories from the group's newspapers.

== Ownership structure ==
Like the Schwerin newspaper publisher and the A. Beig Druckerei in Pinneberg, is a wholly owned subsidiary of medien holding:nord GmbH based in Flensburg. The latter also holds a 20.1% stake as the largest single shareholder in Regiocast, which in turn holds stakes in numerous subsidiaries that operate regional radio stations. On February 24, 2016, it was announced that the company NOZ Medien would take over medien holding:nord GmbH. The Federal Cartel Office gave the green light for the merger on April 7.

sh:z operates under the name "sh:z Schleswig-Holsteinischer Zeitungsverlag GmbH & Co. KG" and is a limited partnership whose general partner is sh:z Verwaltungs GmbH, based in Flensburg. The managing directors are Stefan Berthold, Jens Wegmann and Paul Wehberg. The publishers are Werner F. Ebke and Jan Dirk Elstermann. The editors-in-chief are Stefan Hans Kläsener, Miriam Scharlibbe, Gerrit Bastian Mathiesen and Jan Frederik Schönstedt.

== Titles ==
- Eckernförder Zeitung
- Flensburger Tageblatt
- Holsteinischer Courier
- Husumer Nachrichten
- Der Insel-Bote
- Schleswig-Holsteinische Landeszeitung
- Norddeutsche Rundschau
- Nordfriesland Tageblatt
- Ostholsteiner Anzeiger
- Schleswiger Nachrichten
- Schlei-Bote
- Stormarner Tageblatt
- Sylter Rundschau
- Wilstersche Zeitung
- Pinneberger Tageblatt
- Quickborner Tageblatt
- Schenefelder Tageblatt
- Wedel-Schulauer Tageblatt
- Barmstedter Zeitung
- Elmshorner Nachrichten
- Glückstädter Fortuna
