= Amrum North Frisian =

North Frisian dialect of Amrum, Germany

Amrum Frisian
- Öömrang
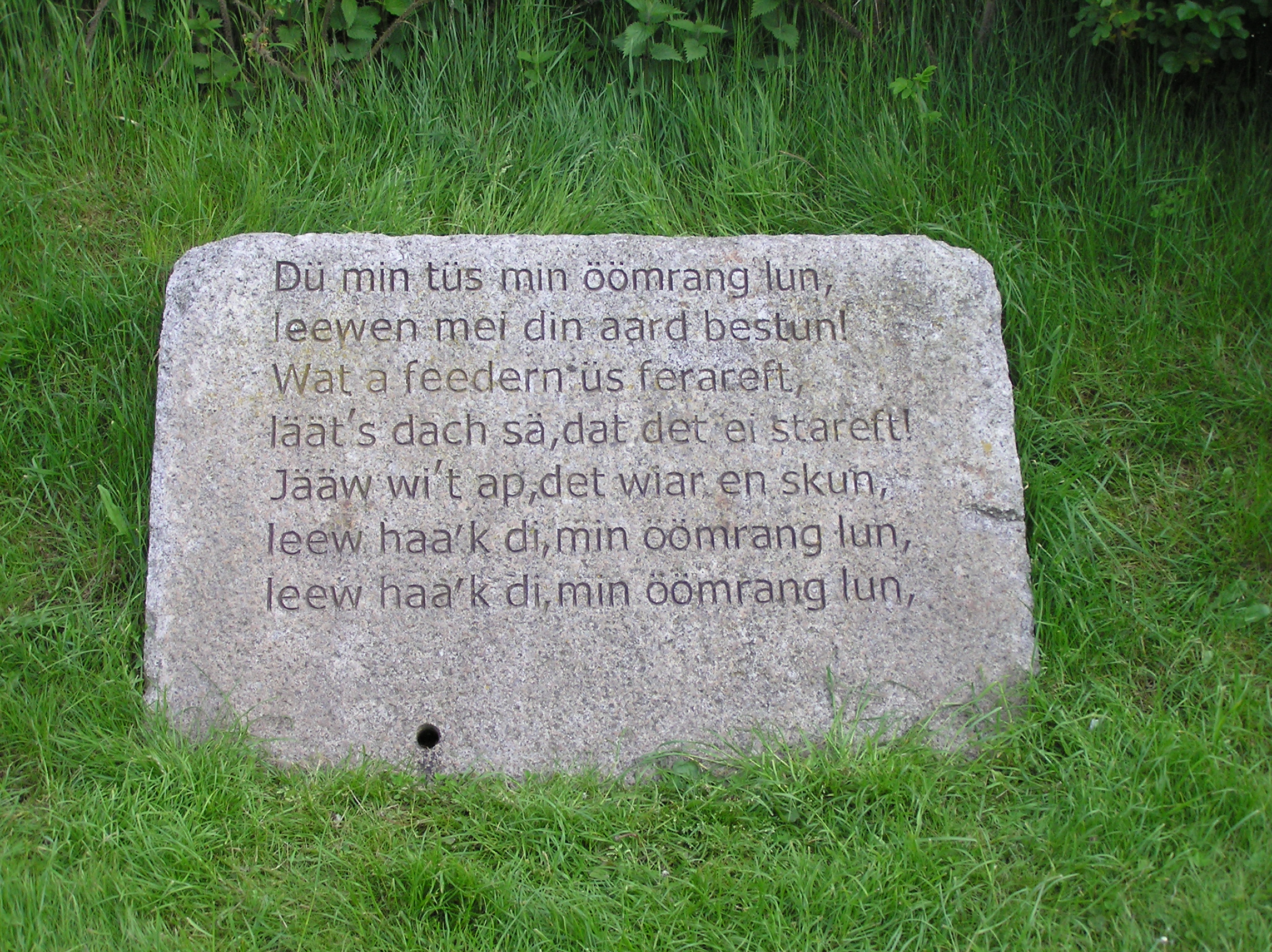
- A stone displaying a stanza from "Min Öömrang Lun", a traditional song from Amrum island
- Native to: Germany
- Region: Amrum, Nordfriesland
- Native speakers: (undated figure of ca. 800)
- Language family: Indo-European: Germanic; West Germanic; North Sea Germanic; Anglo-Frisian; Frisian; North Frisian; Insular; Föhr–Amrum; Amrum Frisian

Language codes
- ISO 639-3: –
- Glottolog: amru1234
- Linguasphere: 2-ACA-dba
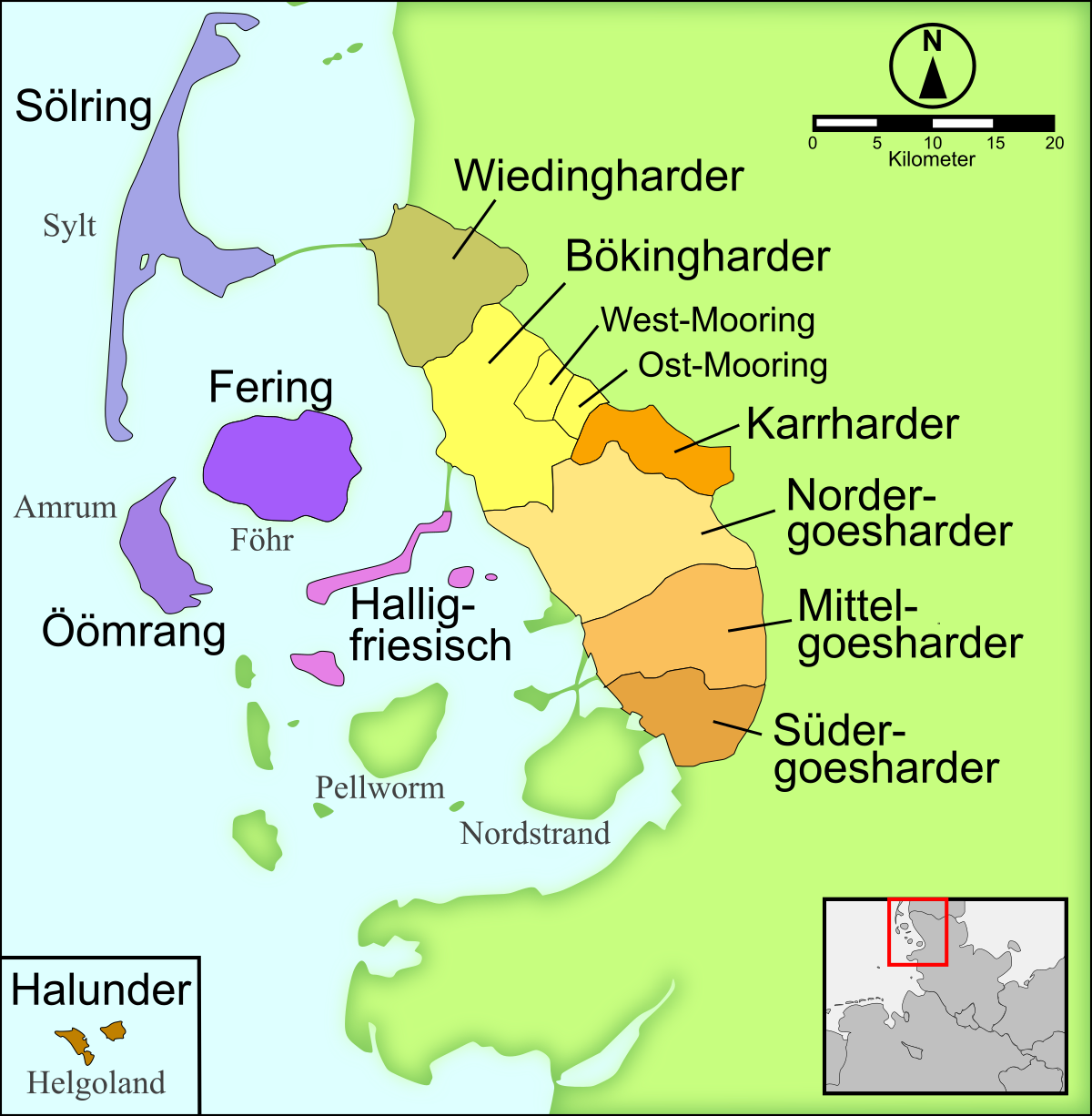
- North Frisian dialects

Amrum Frisian, also known as Öömrang, is the dialect of the North Frisian language spoken on the island of Amrum in the North Frisia region of Germany. Öömrang refers to the Öömrang Frisian name of Amrum, which is Oomram. Alongside the Fering, Söl'ring, and Heligolandic dialects, it is part of the insular group of North Frisian dialects, and it bears a close resemblance to Fering. Öömrang is spoken by approximately one-third of Amrum's 2,300 inhabitants.

== Characteristics ==
- /a/ is a back vowel, never a front vowel, as in Scots or German, and often corresponds to Sylt North Frisian /e/, e.g.
  - skapp, task, as, at = skepp, fesk, es, et
- /o/ as in English 'not’. It is replaced in the dialect of Sylt by /u/,
  - cf. tong, wonter, jong, wost = tung, wunter, jung, wust
- 'uai' is seldom found except in the speech of Sylt, in which dialect the accent falls on the 'a’. In Föhr and Amrum it is usually reduced to 'ui'
- Many words which in the dialect of Föhr-Amrum have 'nj’ have only ’n’ in the dialects of the mainland.
- At the beginning of words 'tj’ is some times found instead of 'k’ in the speech of Föhr and Amrum.
  - C.f. welkimmen and weltjimmen.
- Final "w" is pronounced like a short "u" (e.g. leew [dear, sweet]).
- The "r" is rolled, though sometimes softened.
- Two gender-system.

== Personal and family names ==
Personal names on Amrum are still greatly influenced by Frisian elements to this day. Notably, hypocorisms and names with two elements are common. Early borrowings were made from the Danish language and the Christianisation of the North Frisians around 1000 A.D. brought a modest influence of Christian and biblical names. In the Age of Sail, Dutch and West Frisian forms became popular.

Family names were usually patronymic, i.e. they were individually created as genitives from the father's given name. Contrary to the Scandinavian Petersen or Petersson, meaning "Peter's son", an Öömrang name like Peters means "of Peter". This practice was eventually prohibited by the Danish Crown in 1828.

== Usage ==
Lars von Karstedt has illustrated the ominous situation of Öömrang today. The usage of Öömrang is now restricted in home domain. It has lost its function in public communication to German and is only spoken in the households with elderly native speakers of Öömrang. One of the biggest driving forces of the language shift is the change of economic structure brought by the tourism industry. The tourists from across Germany crowded into the small island of Amrum and have quickly taken up the limited housing. Consequently, the rent rapidly increased, driving a lot of the local youngsters out to live in major cities in mainland Germany. Both the influx of English-speaking or German-speaking tourists and tourism employees and the loss of young native speakers are causing drastic decline of the dialect.
