= List of drugs: Cm–Co =

This multi-page article lists pharmaceutical drugs alphabetically by name. Many drugs have more than one name and, therefore, the same drug may be listed more than once. Brand names and generic names are differentiated by capitalizing brand names.

See also the list of the top 100 bestselling branded drugs, ranked by sales.

Abbreviations are used in the list as follows:

- INN = International nonproprietary name
- BAN = British Approved Name
- USAN = United States Adopted Name
- Two-letter codes for countries

Lists of drugs
1–9 | A | B | C | D | E | F | G | H | I | J | K | L | M | N | O | P | Q | R | S | T | U | V | W | X | Y | Z

Ca | Cb–Ce | Cf–Ch | Ci | Cj–Cl | Cm–Co | Cp–Cz

== cm ==
- CMV-IGIV

== co ==
- Co-Gesic
- Co-Lav
- Co-Pyronil 2 Pulvules

=== coa-cog ===
- CoActifed
- Coactin
- Cobal
- Cobalasine Injection
- cobamamide (INN)
- Cobavite
- Cobenfy
- Cobex
- cobicistat (INN)
- cobiprostone (USAN, INN)
- Cobolin-M
- cocaine
- cocarboxylase (INN)
- codactide (INN)
- Codafed
- Codamine
- codeine
- Codeprex
- Codiclear DH
- Codimal-L.A. 12
- codoxime (INN)
- Codoxy
- Codrix
- cofisatin (INN)
- cogazocine (INN)
- Cogentin
- Cognex

=== col ===
- Col-Probenecid

==== cola-colu ====
- Colace
- Colazal
- ColBenemid
- Cold Capsule V
- Coldlac-LA
- Coldloc
- colecalciferol (INN)
- coleneuramide (USAN, INN)
- colesevelam (INN)
- Colestid
- colestilan (INN)
- colestipol (INN)
- colestolone (INN)
- colestyramine (INN)
- colextran (INN)
- colfenamate (INN)
- colforsin (INN)
- colfosceril palmitate (INN)
- Colgate Total
- colimecycline (INN)
- colistimethate sodium (INN)
- colistin (INN)
- collagenase clostridium histolyticum (USAN)
- Colocort
- Colonaid
- Colovage
- colterol (INN)
- Columvi

==== coly ====
- Coly-Mycin M
- Coly-Mycin S
- Colyte

=== com-con ===
- Combantrin
- Combipatch
- Combipres
- Combivent
- Combivir
- Combogesic IV
- comfilcon A (USAN)
- Comfort Tears Solution
- Comhist
- Commit Lozenge
- Compazine
- Compound 65
- compound insulin zinc suspension (INN)
- compound solution of sodium chloride (INN)
- compound solution of sodium lactate (INN)
- Compro
- Comtan
- Comtrex
- Comvax
- conatumumab (USAN, INN)
- conbercept (INN)
- Concentraid
- Conceptrol
- Concerta
- concizumab (USAN, INN)
- concizumab-mtci
- condoliase (INN)
- Condyline
- Condylox
- conessine (INN)
- conestat alfa (INN)
- Conexxence
- Congess Jr.
- Congess Sr.
- Congest
- Congestac
- Congestant D
- conivaptan (INN)
- conorfone (INN)
- Conray
- Constant-T Tablet
- Constilac
- Constulose
- Contac 12 Hour
- Contac
- Contrased
- Controloc
- Contuss
- contusugene ladenovec (USAN, INN)

=== cop ===
- Copalia
- Copalia HCT
- Copaxone
- Copegus
- Cophene-B
- Copper T Model TCU 380a
- copper histidinate (USAN, INN)

=== cor ===
- Cor-Oticin

==== corb-cors ====
- corbadrine (INN)
- Cordarone
- Cordran-N
- Cordran
- Corectim
- Coreg
- Corgard
- Corgonject
- Coricidin
- corifollitropin alfa (INN)
- Corlopam
- Cormax
- cormetasone (INN)
- Corphed
- Corsym

==== cort-corz ====
- Cort-Dome
- CortaGel
- Cortalone
- Cortan
- Cortavance
- Cortef
- Cortenema
- Corticaine
- corticorelin (INN)
- corticotropin zinc hydroxide (INN)
- corticotropin (INN)
- Cortifoam
- Cortimyxin
- cortisone (INN)
- Cortisporin
- cortisuzol (INN)
- cortivazol (INN)
- Cortoderm
- cortodoxone (INN)
- Cortone
- Cortril
- Cortrophin-Zinc
- Cortrosyn
- Corvert
- Coryphen Codeine
- Corzide

=== cos-coz ===
- cosibelimab (USAN, INN)
- cositecan (USAN, INN)
- Cosmegen
- CosmoFer
- Cosopt
- Cotazym
- Cotellic
- cotinine (INN)
- Cotrim
- cotriptyline (INN)
- Coumadin
- coumafos (INN)
- coumamycin (INN)
- coumazoline (INN)
- coumetarol (INN)
- Covera-HS
- Coversyl
- covirasil (INN)
- Coxatab
- Cozaar
