= Frederik Paulsen =

Frederik Paulsen may refer to:

- Frederik Paulsen Sr (1909–1997), medical doctor and founder of Ferring Pharmaceuticals
- Frederik Paulsen Jr (born 1950), his son, businessman, academic, philanthropist and explorer
