= Oceans defender =

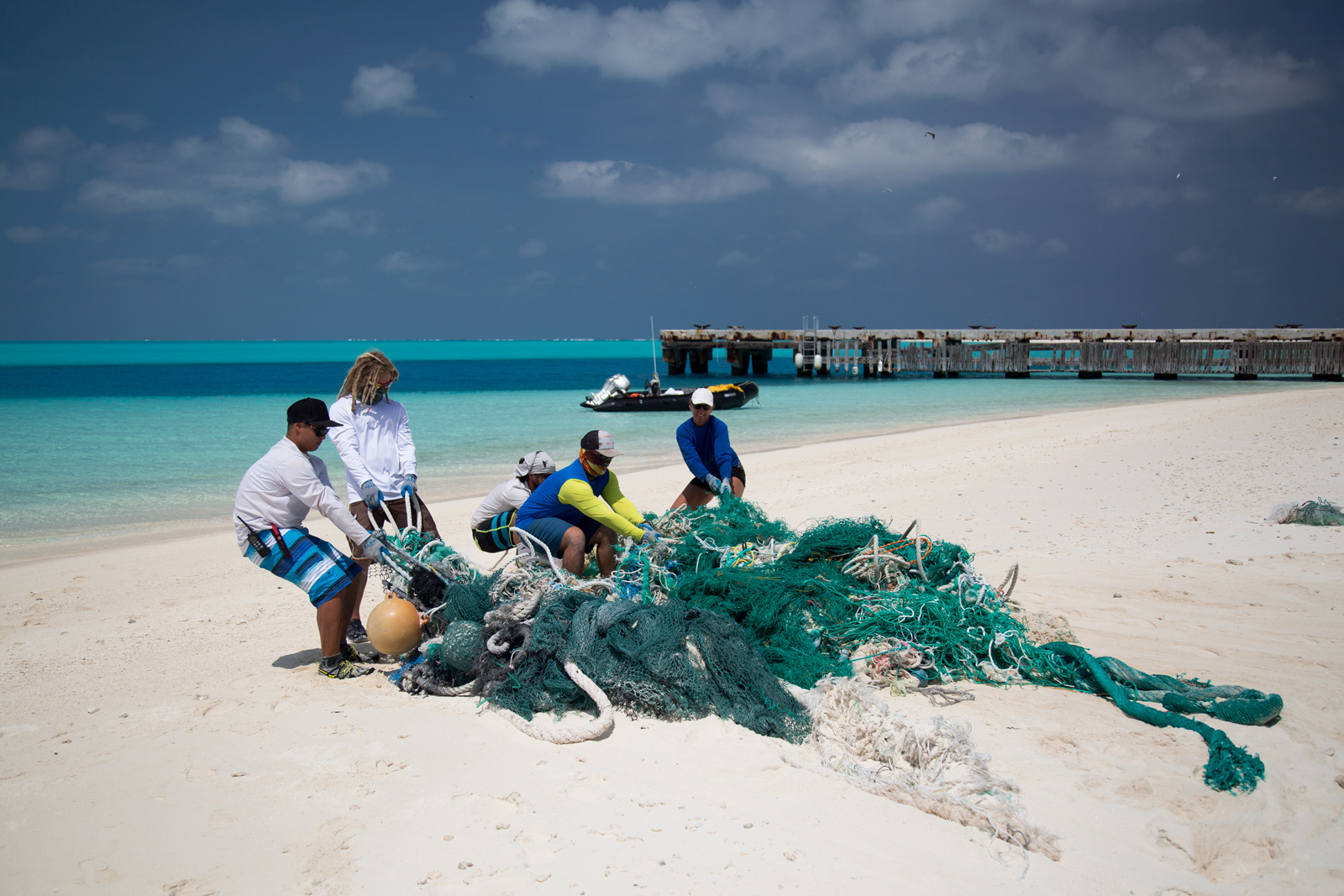
Cleaning beach debris in Papahānaumokuākea Marine National Monument, Hawaii.

An oceans defender is a human rights and environmental activist focused on protecting the Earth's oceans. General objectives include protecting the rights of human beings as well as defending aquatic ecosystems from pollution or destruction. They generally oppose extractivism, overfishing, unreported fishing, and human rights abuses of those living on coastlines or in ocean-reliant economies.

Oceans defender is a term used to describe individuals, organizations, or communities working to protect marine ecosystems and the human rights of people who depend on the ocean. Oceans defenders include small-scale fishers, climate activists, conservationists, Indigenous peoples, youth, researchers, and environmental human rights defenders whose work focuses on safeguarding the ocean and defending those affected by environmental harm.

The concept has gained international recognition due to increasing threats to the marine environment, including overfishing, deep-sea mining, plastic pollution, coastal development, and climate change. Oceans defenders advocate for sustainable governance of marine resources and demand accountability from governments and corporations whose activities affect coastal communities.

In 2000, underwater photographer Kurt Lieber founded the Ocean Defenders Alliance to "help the ecosystem survive [an] onslaught of man-made debris and pollution." It became a 501(c)(3) nonprofit in 2002.

In 2011, Gigi Brisson formed the Ocean Elders group, a worldwide group of activists including Sylvia Earle, Richard Branson, Jackson Browne, James Cameron, Rita R. Colwell, Jean-Michel Cousteau, Wade Davis, Jane Goodall, Gerry Lopez, Catherine A. Novelli, Frederik Paulsen Jr, Bertrand Piccard, Thomas Remengesau Jr., David E. Shaw, Nainoa Thompson, Ted Turner, Don Walsh, Bob Weir, Sheila Watt-Cloutier, Neil Young, and José María Figueres.

Circa 2013, Greenpeace proliferated photographs from its Oceans Defender Tour, documenting "illegal and destructive fishing methodologies in the Gulf of Thailand." The following year, Greenpeace Southeast Asia published a list of 10 everyday tasks citizens can do to help ocean defenders.

In 2020, the World Forum of Fisher Peoples (representing 10 million small-scale fishers from 54 countries) issued a statement affirming the necessity of ocean defenders in continuing to preserve human rights for those reliant on oceans for economic benefit.

In 2022, Nigerian environmental activist Nnimmo Bassey endorsed a toolkit for "Oceans and Human Rights Defenders," detailing methods of unity and advocacy.

In 2022, Frontiers in Marine Science noted that ocean defenders face additional risk because they "are frequently from groups already subject to historical and continued structural marginalization and exclusion from decision-making. This includes small-scale fishers, Indigenous Peoples, Peoples of Colour, women and youth."

In 2023, the University of British Columbia shared a document under the title "[m]ore must be done to protect ocean defenders." The same year, Time for Kids published an interview with Sylvia Earle titled "Ocean Defender." Earle identified the largest current issue for ocean defenders as deep sea mining to create batteries for electronic vehicles, which harms deep sea ecosystems. She also denounced fish as food, stating, "[we need] to get over this idea that ocean wildlife is needed for our food security. We are now beginning to understand the high cost [to the environment] of eating fish."

Many oceans defenders are categorized by the United Nations and other global institutions as Environmental human rights defenders (EHRDs) because their activism involves protecting both the environment and fundamental human rights

== Background ==
Ocean protection has historically been led by marine conservationists, local fishers, and civil society organizations. However, growing environmental pressures and the global expansion of the “blue economy” have increased the need for individuals who defend ocean health. Issues such as plastic pollution, offshore drilling, deep-sea mining, and destructive fishing practices have intensified conflicts between industrial activities and community rights.

The recognition of the human right to a clean, healthy, and sustainable environment by the United Nations in 2021 has further highlighted the role of oceans defenders in ensuring marine environments remain vital and healthy for present and future generations.

== Roles and Activities ==
Oceans defenders engage in a wide range of activities, including:

- Monitoring, Reporting, and Stopping Environmental Violations
- Resisting Harmful Coastal and Offshore Industrial Projects
- Supporting Sustainable Small-scale Fisheries
- Restoring Marine Ecosystems such as Mangroves, Coral reefs, and Seagrass
- Advocating for Indigenous and Community land sea rights
- Campaigning against deep sea mining and destructive fishing
- Engaging in Scientific Research to Support Conservation Efforts
- Promoting Environmental Justice for Coastal and Island Communities

Their work links environmental protection with social and economic rights, especially in regions where marine ecosystems provide food, livelihoods, and cultural identity.

== Risk and Challenges ==
Oceans defenders often face significant risks, particularly in areas where powerful commercial interests operate. Identified challenges include:

- Environmental Degradation Affecting their Safety and Livelihoods
- Limited Access to Information and Decision making Spaces
- Lack of Legal Protection
- Discrimination, especially for Indigenously and Youth Defenders
- Criminalization of Peaceful Protest
- Threats, Harassment, and Violence

Research published in Frontiers in Marine Science notes that oceans defenders are disproportionately drawn from communities historically marginalized in policymaking, including small-scale fishers, Indigenous peoples, and young activists.

== See also ==
- Land defenders
- Human rights defenders
- Environmental movement
- Effects of climate change
- Marine pollution
