= Géraldine Savary =

Swiss politician and journalist

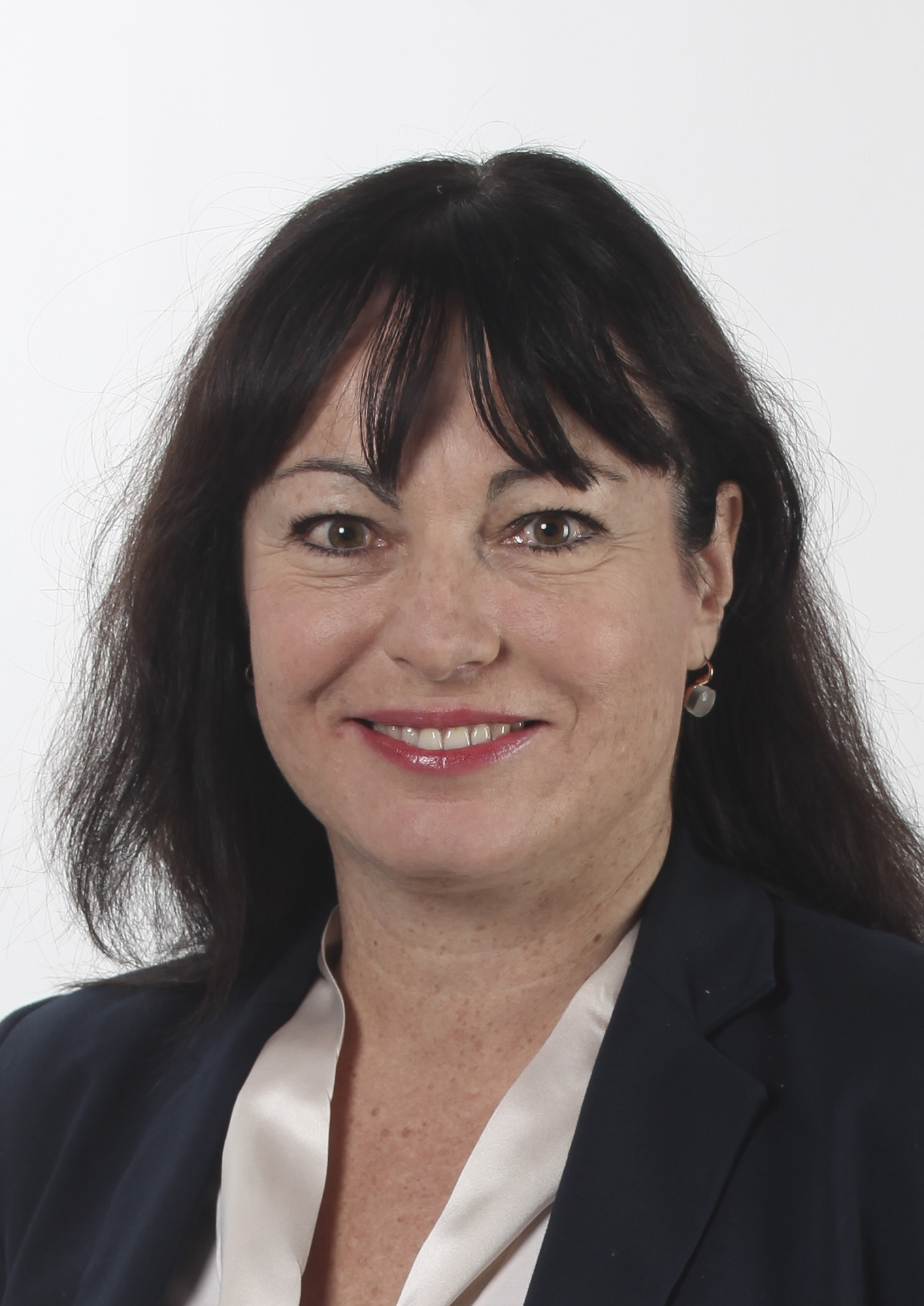
- Géraldine Savary, in 2015

Member of the National Council of Switzerland
- In office 2003–2007

Member of the Council of States of Switzerland
- In office 2007–2019

Personal details
- Born: Géraldine Savary; 14 November 1968 (age 57) Bulle, Switzerland
- Citizenship: Swiss and French
- Party: Social Democratic Party of Switzerland (SP)
- Occupation: Journalist, Politician

Géraldine Savary (14 November 1968) is a journalist and politician of the Social Democratic Party of Switzerland (SP), former member of the National Council and the Council of States and the current director of the Federal Commission of the Swiss postal services, PostCom.

== Early life and education ==
She was born in Bulle in canton Fribourg into a family with a social background. The father was a typograph involved in the workers' union and her mother was a teacher. In the Swiss typographers strike in 1970s, in which her father was involved, she began to become familiar with the social issues of life as her father worried whether he would be able to keep his job. She obtained a licentiate in political sciences from the University of Lausanne in 1991, and worked as a journalist for the magazine Domaine Public from 1994 onwards.

== Political career ==
Savary began her political career in 1998 on the Lausanne City Council. In the parliamentary elections in 2003, she was elected to the National Council representing the SP for the Canton de Vaud and in the 2007 elections to the Council of States, also representing the SP for the canton of Vaud. In the Council of States she was a member of the Commission for Science, Education and Culture, the Commission for Legal Issues, the Commission for Transport and Telecommunications and the editorial commission. From June 1999 to December 2003 she was President of the SP Lausanne. In the federal elections of 2015 she was re-elected to the Council of States. In November 2018, she announced that she did not want to stand for re-election to the Council of States in 2019. It had previously become known that the Russian honorary consul in Lausanne, and owner of the Ferring Pharmaceuticals Frederik Paulsen, had supported her several times in the election campaign, but no violation was observed.

== Professional career ==
She has been President of the Federal Postal Commission PostCom since the beginning of 2020, succeeding Hans Hollenstein. By 2021, she also assumed as the Editor in chief of Femina, which she said would become a magazine more open for feminist and LGBT related topics.

== Personal life ==
Géraldine Savary is married to Grégoire Junod (SP), the mayor of Lausanne and has two children. Her place of origin is Sâles in canton Fribourg and she has a Swiss as well as a French citizenship.
