= Alina Szmant =

American marine biologist

Alina Szmant is a retired professor of marine biology whose research focused on physiological ecology and reproductive biology of reef corals. She was a member of the all-female crew of the Tektite II underwater habitat project. She is the developer of CISME, and CEO of CISME Instruments, LLC.

== Early life and education ==
Szmant was born in Dayton, Ohio and lived in Pittsburgh, Pennsylvania until the age of 10. She then moved to Cuba with her family until she was 15. After the U.S. and Cuba severed relations, the family fled to Miami, Florida for a short time before moving to Puerto Rico where she finished high school.

Szmant studied marine biology at the University of Puerto Rico and in 1966 she obtained a B.S. in biology. In 1970, she obtained an M.S. in Marine Biology from Scripps Institution of Oceanography and in 1980, a Ph.D. in Biological Oceanography from the University of Rhode Island.

== Career ==
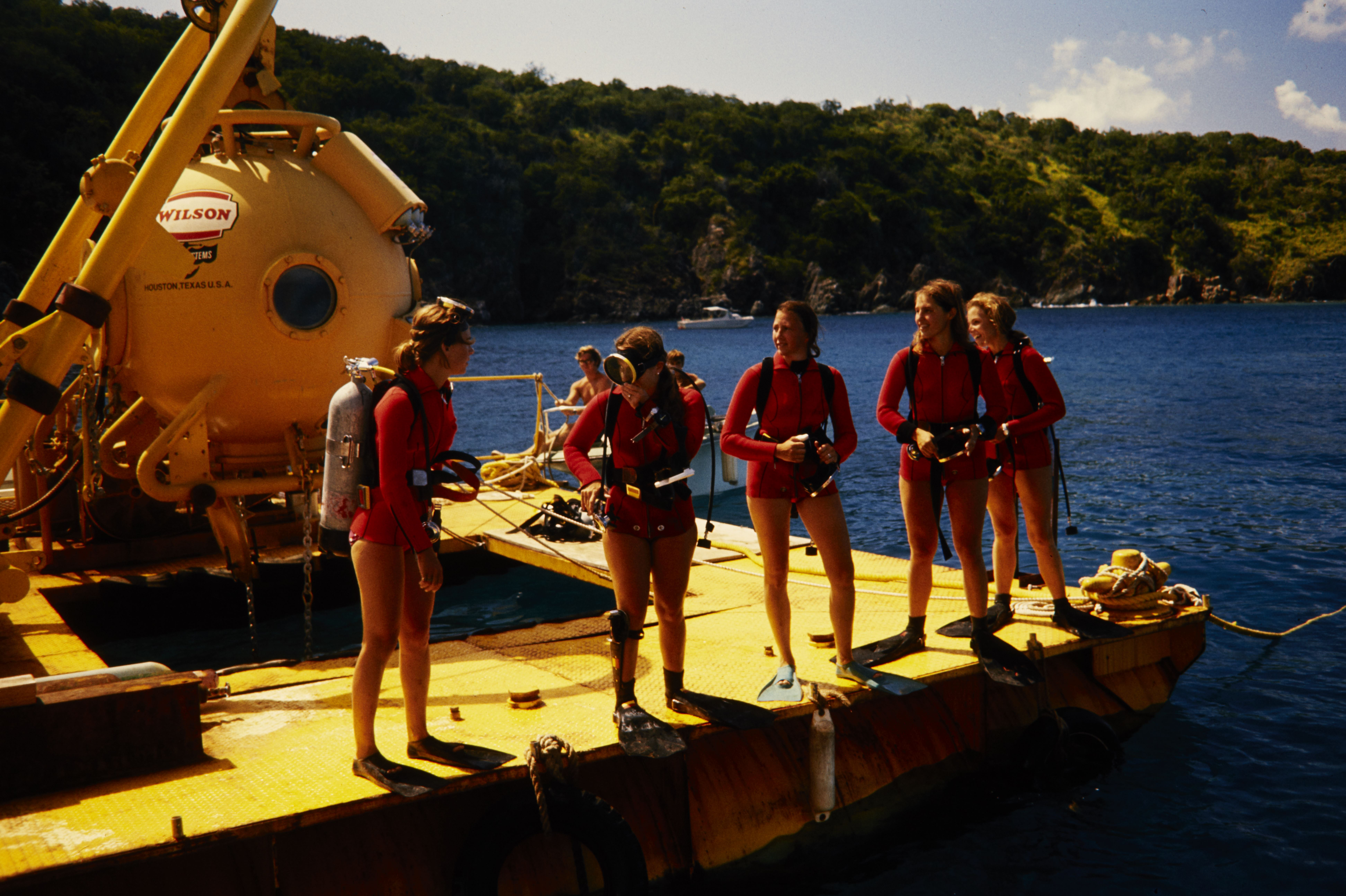
Ann Hartline, Sylvia Earle, Renate True, Alina Szmant, and Peggy Lucas Bond training in preparation for the Tektite II project.

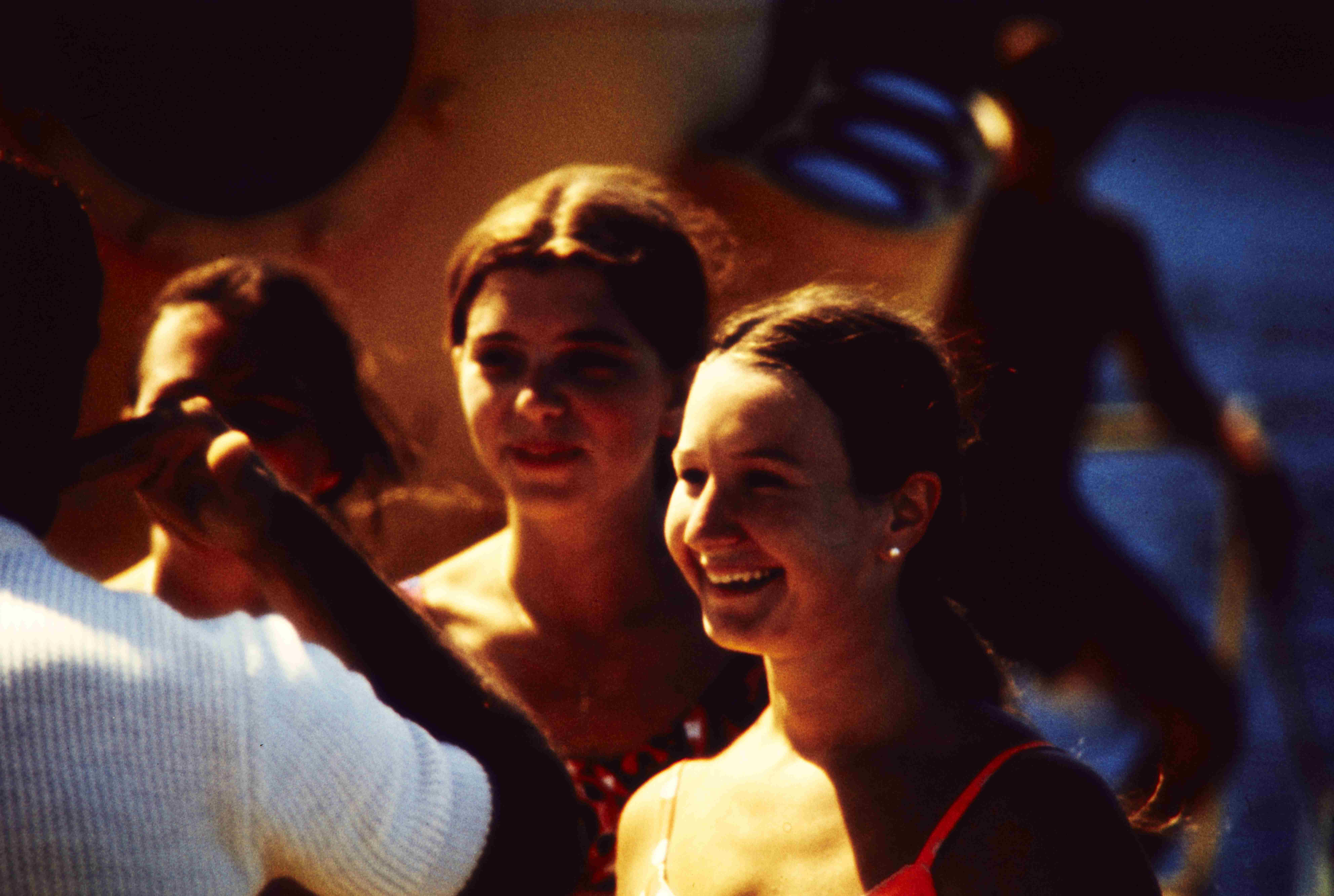
On right: Alina Szmant during the Tektite II preparations.

In 1970, Szmant took part in an all women's research team that was observed by NASA and the United States Department of the Interior during the Tektite II project. Szmant, Ann Hartline, Sylvia Earle, Renate True, and Peggy Lucas Bond spent 14 days 50 ft underwater in Tektite, an underwater structure located off-shore of St. John in the U.S. Virgin Islands. During her 14 days in Tektite, Szmant studied and performed research in and around corals and seagrass beds. The results from the Tektite II project aided NASA in launching their first space station in 1979.

During the years 1970 to 1973, Szmant was a part of the research staff at the University of Puerto Rico and the Puerto Rico Nuclear Center. From 1980 to 1983, she was a part of the research faculty at Florida State University.

In 1982 and 1983, Szmant conducted research on coral reproduction and found evidence for sexual reproduction of corals in the Caribbean. This research was published in her study, "Sexual reproduction by the Caribbean reef corals Montastrea annularis and M. cavernosa," in 1991. Her research preceded the first publication documenting sexual reproduction in corals in the Great Barrier Reef in 1984 by Peter L. Harrison.

From 1983 to 1999, Szmant was a professor of marine biology at the University of Miami's Rosenstiel School of Marine and Atmospheric Science. She also was on the Scientific Technical Advisory Committee for the Water Quality Plan of the Florida Keys National Marine Sanctuary between 1994 and 2004. In 1999, Szmant joined the University of North Carolina Wilmington as an adjunct professor, where she remained until her retirement from academia.

In 2001, Szmant helped spearhead restoration efforts for coral reef habitats in the Florida Keys National Marine Sanctuary. The recovery plan revolved around the re-introduction of the black long-spined sea urchin Diadema to create healthy habitats for corals.

CISME instrument being used.

In 2010, the National Oceanic and Atmospheric Administration (NOAA) funded Szmant and fellow researcher at University of North Carolina Wilmington, Rob Whitehead, to develop a new instrument to measure coral health. The result was CISME (Community In Situ MEtabolism, pronounced "kiss-me"), the first non-invasive, diver-portable respirometer designed to measure respiration, photosynthesis and calcification rates in corals. This development can help researchers study coral habitats and further understand coral bleaching, climate change, and flooding sediment. Szmant launched a startup in 2018 to market CISME, aiming to advance coral research and conservation worldwide. She is the CEO of CISME Instruments, LLC.

== Awards ==
2013: AAUS Scientific Diving Lifetime Achievement Award

== Publications ==
Szmant has 110 scientific research papers that have been cited over 9,000 times.
