= C23H29NO3 =

The molecular formula C_{23}H_{29}NO_{3} (molar mass: 367.48 g/mol, exact mass: 367.2147 u) may refer to:

- Benzethidine
- Codorphone
- Fenbutrazate
- Phenoperidine
- Propiverine
