= Museum Kunst der Westküste =

Coordinates: 54°42′30″N 8°30′36″E

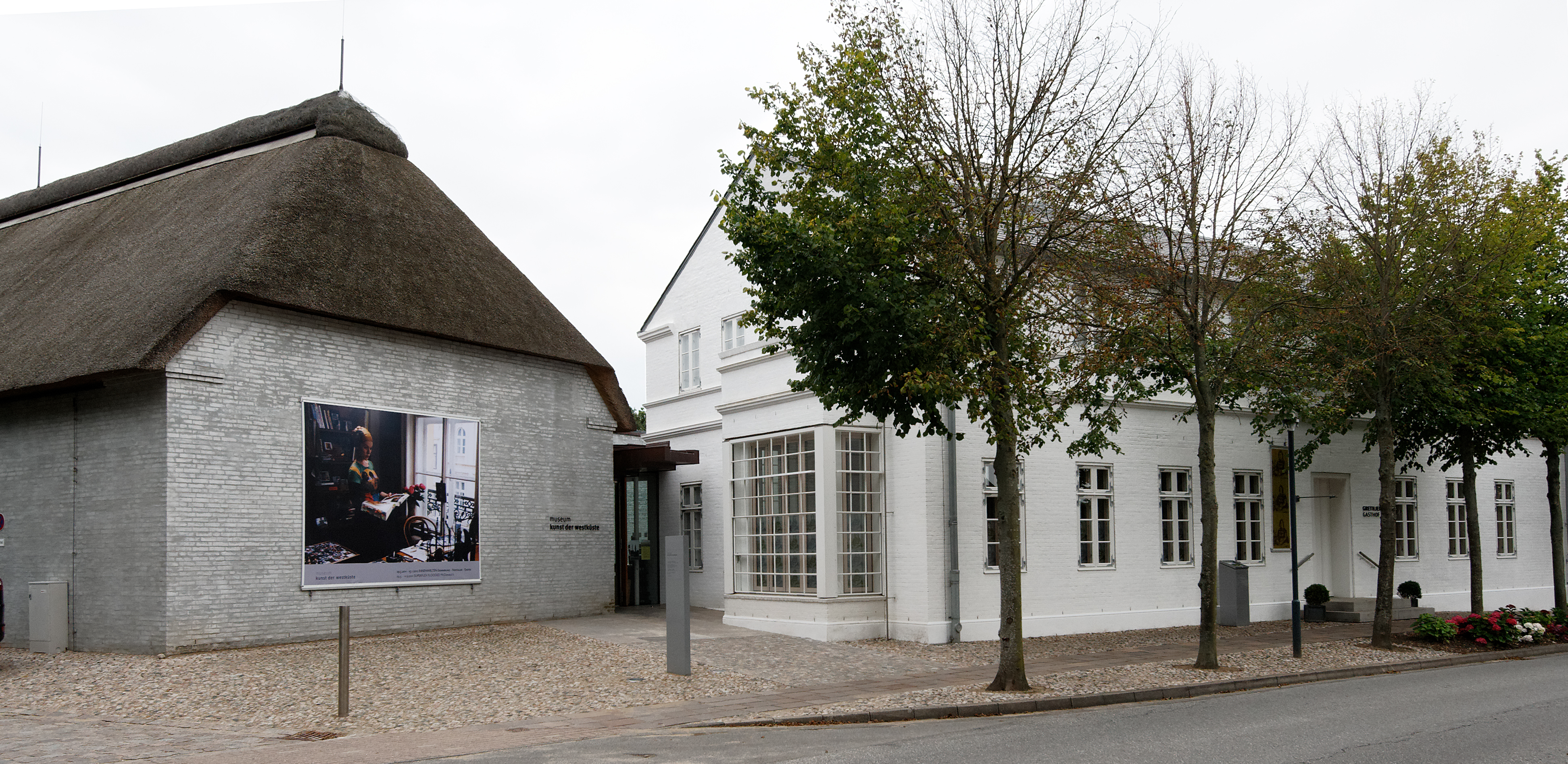
- Established: 2009
- Location: Hauptstraße 1, 25938 Alkersum/Föhr, Germany
- Type: Art museum
- Visitors: 45,000 (2010)
- Founder: Frederik Paulsen Jr.
- Director: Thorsten Sadowsky
- Architect: Sunder-Plassmann Architekten
- Website: www.mkdw.de

The Museum Kunst der Westküste (Museum of West Coast Art) is a non-profit foundation, located in Alkersum on the north Frisian island, Föhr. The museum collects, researches, communicates and exhibits art that deals with the themes of sea and coast. The museum began with a collection of paintings donated by the museum's founder, Frederik Paulsen, chairman of Ferring Pharmaceuticals.

== Collection ==
The Sammlung Kunst der Westküste (Collection of West Coast Art) comprises Danish, German, Dutch and Norwegian art. Executed between 1830 and 1930, the works document life along the continental North Sea coast. Scandinavian and German artists of the 19th and 20th centuries are represented, including Anna Ancher, Michael Ancher, Max Beckmann, Johan Christian Dahl, Peder Severin Krøyer, Christian Krohg, Max Liebermann, Emil Nolde and Edvard Munch.

The collection contains works by Dutch painters such as the Romantic artist, Andreas Schelfhout, and members of The Hague School, Jozef Israëls and Hendrik Willem Mesdag. Johan Barthold Jongkind and Eugène Boudin, who are regarded as precursors of Impressionism and important to the development of European landscape painting in the 19th century, are also represented. Finally, a main focus of the collection is North Frisian painting, represented by the works of de:Otto Heinrich Engel and Hans Peter Feddersen.

== Architecture ==
The Museum was designed by Sunder-Plassmann Architekten as a multipart museum complex, combining tradition and Modernism. The museum contains six galleries with a total exhibition space of over 900 square metres (9,700 sq ft).

The museum's architecture addresses local building and landscape history in by integrating existing buildings like historical barns, and highlighting the differences between the sandy coastal heathlands and the lower marshland. The complex, built between 2006 and 2009, also includes a museum garden and “Grethjens Gasthof“, built in the style of a Scandinavian manor house from around 1900. Carrying on its traditional function as a meeting place for artists working on Föhr and as a site where natives and guests congregate, this building now houses the museum restaurant Grethjens Gasthof.

== Awards ==
In 2011 the museum was nominated for the European Museum of the Year Award. The same year Sunder-Plassmann Architekten were awarded the Architekturpreis Schleswig-Holstein and the museum received the Red Dot Design Award for its corporate design.
