= Ocean Elders =

Activist group dedicated to protecting the ocean and its wildlife

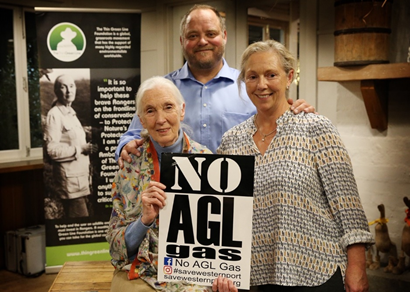
Ocean Elder Jane Goodall (left) protesting AGL gas, likely to protect Western Port Bay

Ocean Elders is a worldwide group of oceans defenders, dedicated to protecting the ocean, wildlife, and nature itself. The group promotes the expansion of existing marine protected areas and the creation of new ones, allowing marine ecosystems to recover from the effects caused by human activities. The Elders oppose the destruction of ecosystems, overfishing, and plastic pollution.

The group includes scientists, musicians, business leaders, royalty, and country leaders.

== History ==
In 2010, Gigi Brisson attended the Mission Blue expedition "where over 100 scientists, business leaders, philanthropists, and entertainment icons came together to support Dr. Sylvia Earle’s TED wish." The following year, Brisson founded the group with the goal of unifying scientists with government and entertainment leaders.

== Members ==
Notable members include:

- Gigi Brisson, founder and CEO
- Sylvia Earle, American marine biologist
- Richard Branson, British business magnate
- Jackson Browne, American singer-songwriter
- James Cameron, Canadian filmmaker
- Rita R. Colwell, American microbiologist
- Jean-Michel Cousteau, French oceanographer
- Wade Davis, Canadian anthropologist
- Jane Goodall, English primatologist
- Gerry Lopez, American actor
- Catherine A. Novelli, American diplomat
- Frederik Paulsen Jr, Swedish businessman
- Bertrand Piccard, Swiss balloonist
- Thomas Remengesau Jr., formerly President of Palau
- David E. Shaw, American Entrepreneur
- Nainoa Thompson, Native Hawaiian navigator
- Ted Turner, American media mogul
- Don Walsh, American oceanographer
- Bob Weir, American musician
- Sheila Watt-Cloutier, Inuk environmentalist
- Neil Young, Canadian-American singer-songwriter
- José María Figueres, former President of Costa Rica
- Albert_II, Prince of Monaco
- Richard H. Bailey
- Rita R. Colwell, American environmental microbiologist and scientific administrator
- Graeme Kelleher, former chairman of the Great Barrier Reef Marine Park Authority (GBRMPA)
- Sven Lindblad, son of Lars-Eric Lindblad
- Queen Noor of Jordan
- Victor Vescovo

== Recent activity ==
In 2016, members of the group visited Cuba as part of a delegation to meet leaders from government, academia and civil society. The goal of the visit was to learn about the measures that have been taken to protect the local marine ecosystems.

In 2017, Ocean Elders wrote to Malcolm Turnbull (then Prime Minister of Australia) with petition to reject the Carmichael coal mine, proposed by Adani Group. The activists argued that the coal mine would have a devastating impact on the Great Barrier Reef.
