= Tektite habitat =

Undersea laboratory and experimental habitat

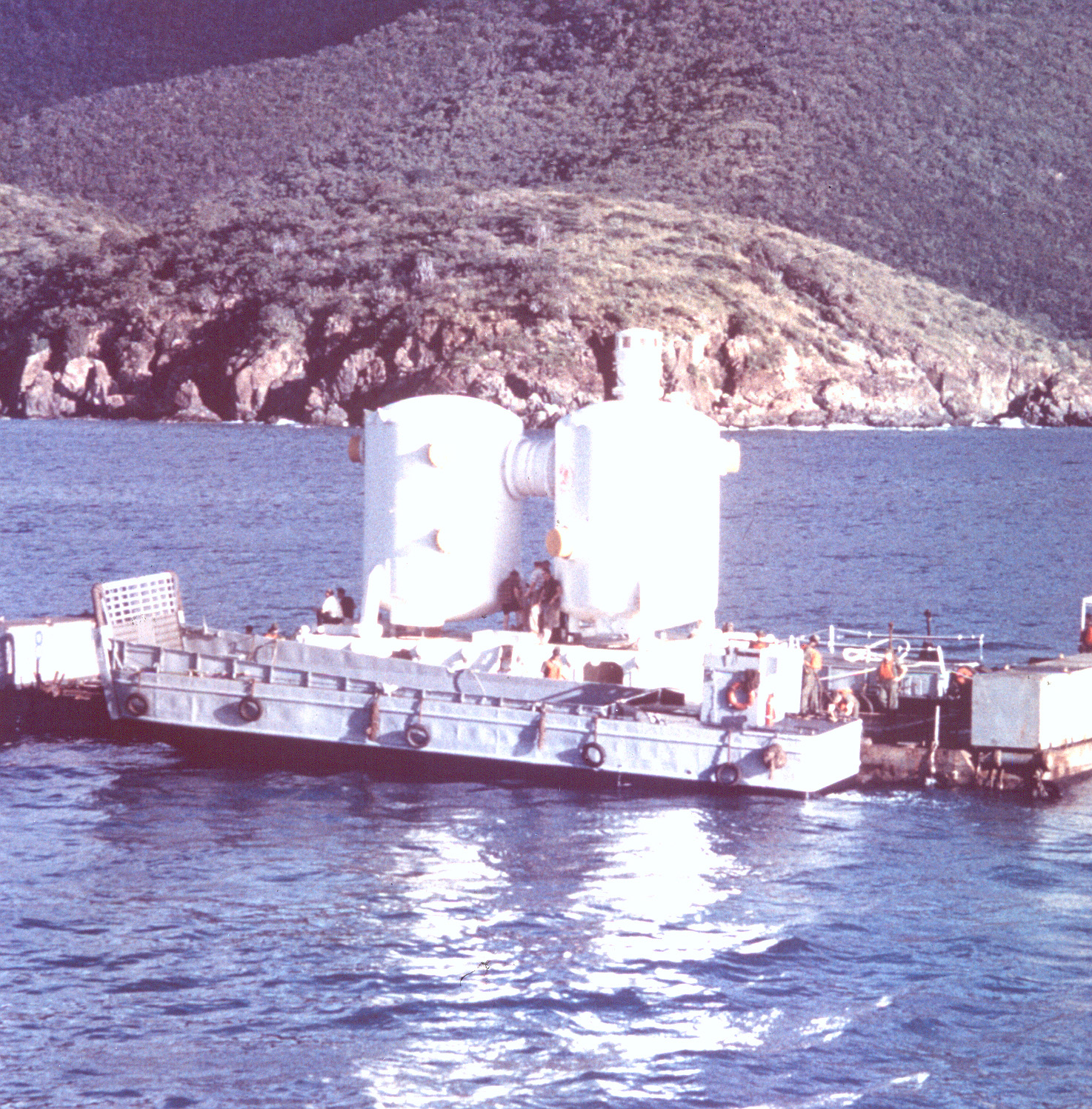
Tektite Habitat was an underwater laboratory which was the home to divers during Tektite I and II programs.

The Tektite habitat was an underwater laboratory which was the home to divers during Tektite I and II programs. The Tektite program was the first scientists-in-the-sea program sponsored nationally. The habitat capsule was placed in Great Lameshur Bay, Saint John, U.S. Virgin Islands in 1969 and again in 1970.

"Tektite III" refers to an educational project in the 1980s, using the original habitat capsule used by scientists, which was restored to be functional, but never used underwater again. Instead, it was open to visitors on dry land in San Francisco.

== Habitat ==
The Tektite habitat was designed and built by General Electric Company Space Division at the Valley Forge Space Technology Center in King of Prussia, Pennsylvania. The Project Engineer who was responsible for the design of the habitat was Brooks Tenney, Jr. Tenney also served as the underwater Habitat Engineer on the International Mission, the last mission on the Tektite II project. The Program Manager for the Tektite projects was Dr. Theodore Marton at General Electric. The habitat appeared as a pair of silos: two white metal cylinders 12.5 feet (3.8 m) in diameter and 18 feet (5.5 m) high, joined by a flexible tunnel and seated on a rectangular base in 43 feet (13 m) depth of water.

== Tektite I ==
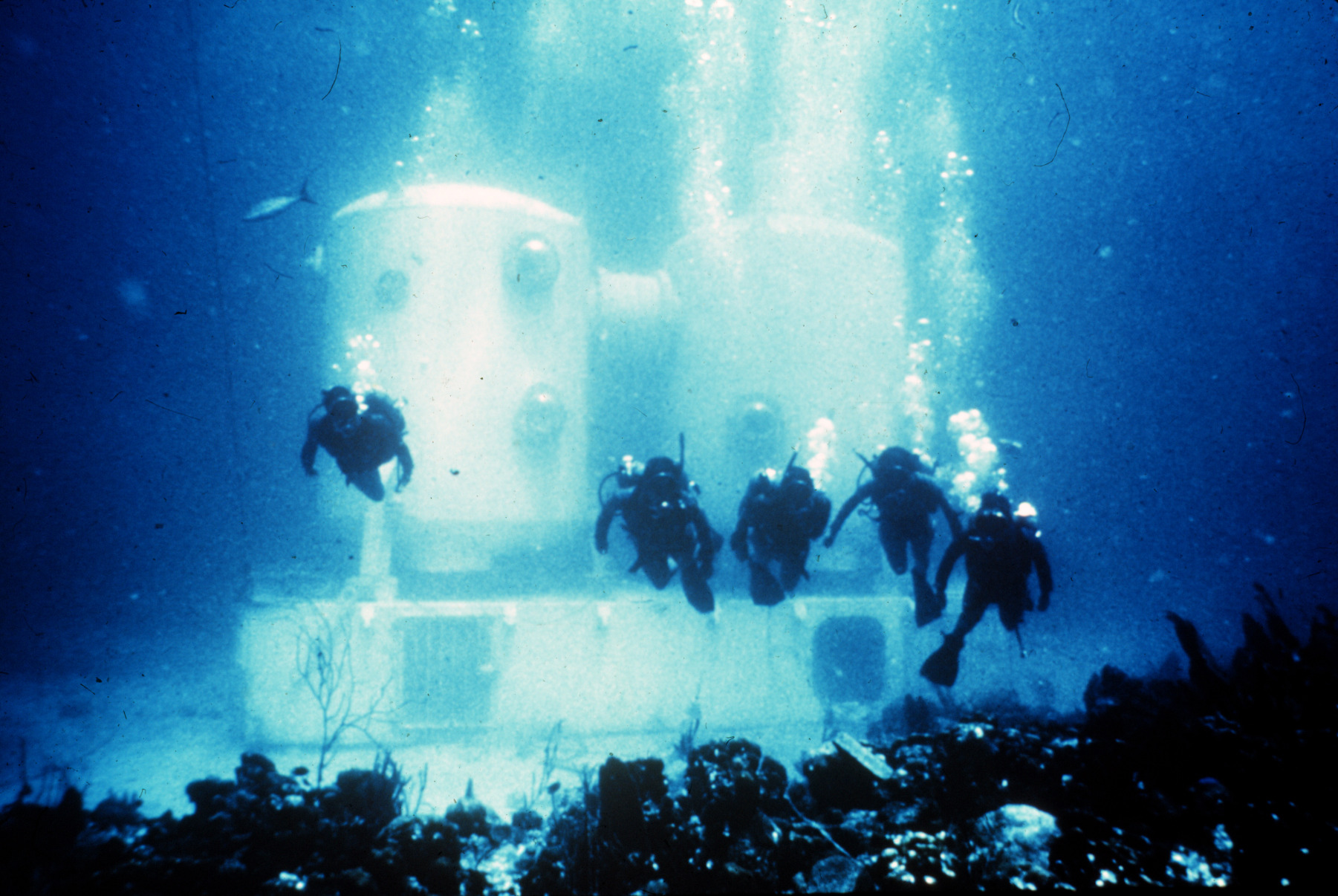
Aquanauts excurt (saturation dive) from Tektite I

On 28 January 1969, a detachment from Amphibious Construction Battalion 2 augmented by an additional 17 Seabee divers from both the Atlantic and Pacific fleets as well as the 21st NCR began the installation of the habitat in Great Lameshur Bay in the U. S. Virgin Islands. They had it completed on February 12. On February 15, 1969, three days later, four U.S. Department of Interior scientists (Ed Clifton, Conrad Mahnken, Richard Waller and John VanDerwalker) descended to the ocean floor to begin the ambitious diving project dubbed "Tektite I". By 18 March 1969, the four aquanauts had established a new world's record for saturated diving by a single team. On April 15, 1969, the aquanaut team returned to the surface with over 58 days of marine scientific studies. More than 19 hours of decompression time were needed to accommodate the scientists' return to the surface. The United States Office of Naval Research coordinated Tektite I. Denzil Pauli, of the Office of Naval Research, was the Program Director for Tektite I.

Much of the research for Tektite I centered on humans in this new environment. Topics investigated would include: biology (blood changes, sleep patterns, oxygen toxicity), decompression and decompression sickness, microbiology and mycology.

== Tektite II ==
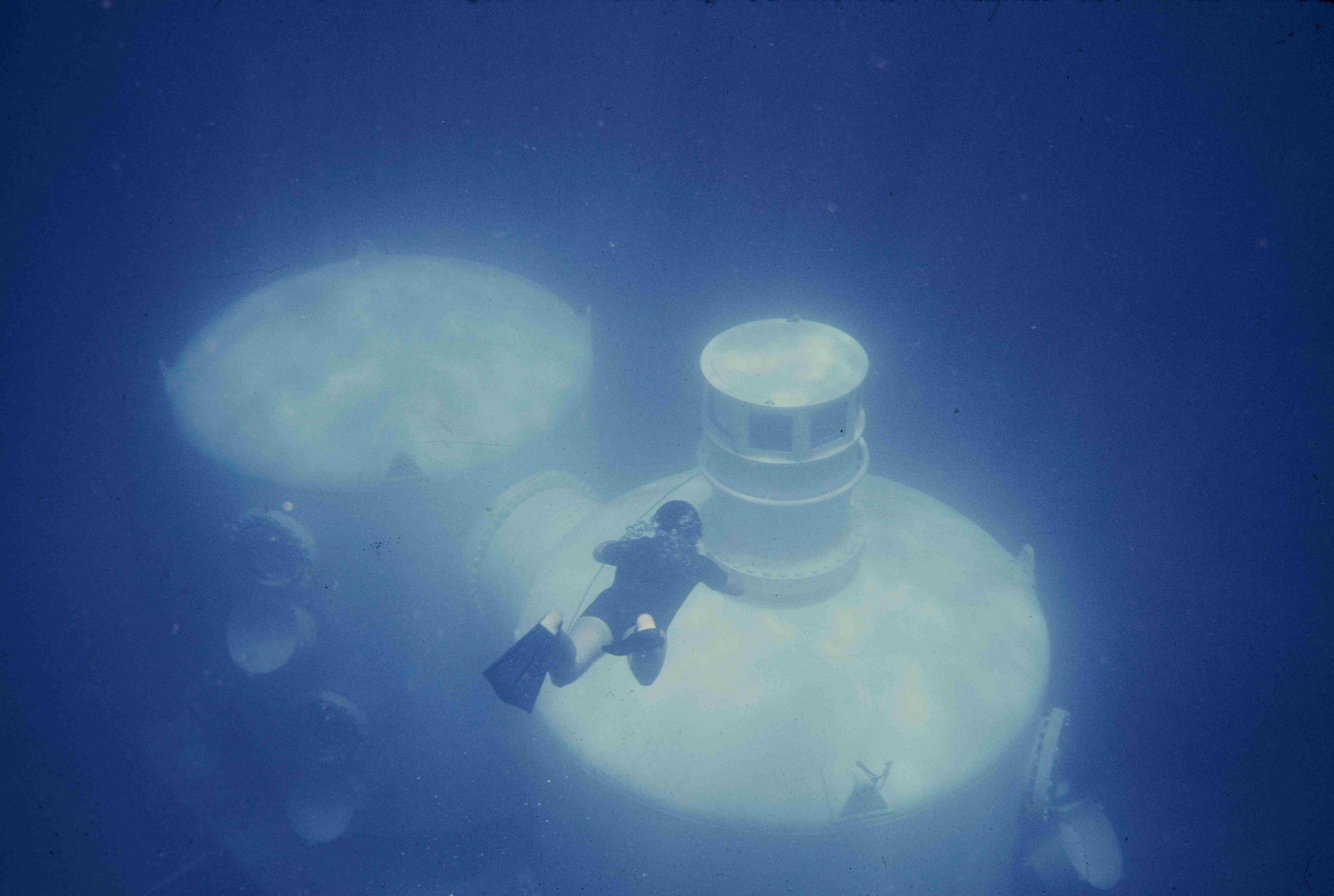
Diver swimming down to Tektite II (April, 1970)

The United States Department of the Interior coordinated Tektite II, with part of the funding coming from NASA, which was interested in the psychological study of the scientific teams working in closed and restricted environments, similar to that of spacecraft on long missions. A team of Behavioral Observers from the University of Texas at Austin, led by Robert Helmreich, were tasked to record round the clock activities of the aquanauts by CCTV.

The missions were carried out in the spring and summer of 1970 in Great Lameshur Bay, Saint John, U.S. Virgin Islands, at a depth of 43-foot (13 m). Tektite II comprised ten missions lasting 10–20 days with four scientists and an engineer on each mission, including one all-female team.

Tektite II missions and crew members:
Mission	Crew	Start date	End date	Duration (days)
1-50	William L. High (Department of the Interior), Alan Beardsley (Department of the Interior), Roger J. Dexter (University of Miami), Richard W. Curry (University of Miami), Edward Batutis (General Electric Company)	1970-04-04	1970-04-17	13
2-50	H. Edward Clifton (Department of the Interior), Ralph Hunter (Department of the Interior), John G. VanDerwalker (Department of the Interior), Ian G. Koblick (Government of the Virgin Islands), Charles Kubokawa (NASA-Ames Research Center )	1970-04-22	1970-05-12	20
3-50	Lawrence Phillips (Department of the Interior), Denny Bowman (Marine Biomedical Institute), Brian D. Gregory (University of Washington), Charles Birkeland (Smithsonian Tropical Research Institute), Charles Cooper (NASA-Marshall Spaceflight Center)	1970-05-12	1970-06-01	20
4-50	Arthur C. Mathieson (University of New Hampshire), Richard Fralick (University of New Hampshire), William W. Schroeder (Texas A&M University), Charles Cooper (NASA-Marshall Spaceflight Center), Thomas J. Bright (Texas A&M University)	1970-06-01	1970-06-20	20
6-50	Sylvia Earle Meade (Los Angeles County Museum of Natural History), Renate Schlenz True (Tulane Medical School), Ann Hartline (University of California), Alina M. Szmant (Scripps Inst. of Oceanography), Margaret Ann Lucas (University of Delaware)	1970-07-06	1970-07-20	14
8-50	William F. Herrnkind (Florida State University), Louis M. Barr (Department of e Interior), John Couch (Department of the Interior), Frederick Hochberg (Department of the Interior), Richard T. Heckman (NASA-Marshall Spaceflight Center)	1970-07-23	1970-08-12	20
10-50	Richard H. Chesher (Westinghouse Corporation), Lawrence McCloskey (Department of the Interior), Bates Littlehales (National Geographic Society), J. Morgan Wells, Jr. (Wrightsville Marine Bio-Medical Lab.), Todd Atkinson (Cape Fear Technical Institute)	1970-08-12	1970-09-02	19
12-50	Richard Cooper (Department of the Interior), Robert J. Ellis (Department of the Interior), M. A. Heeb (University of Miami), C. C. Lee (University of Miami), Todd Atkinson (Cape Fear Technical Institute)	1970-09-02	1970-09-22	20
15-50	Frank H. Talbot (The Australian Museum), Bruce B. Collette (Department of the Interior), C. Lavett Smith (The American Museum of Natural History), James C. Tyler (The Academy of Natural Sciences of Philadelphia), Jeffrey Wayne Marsten (Highline Community College)	1970-09-25	1970-10-12	17
17-50	Merrill A. True (Bio-Oceanic Research, Inc.), Jean-Georges Harmelin (Faculte des Sciences de Marseille), Roland T. von Hentig (Biologische Anstalt, Helgoland), Wolfgang Hickel (Biologische Anstalt, Helgoland), Brooks Tenney (General Electric Company)	1970-10-15	1970-10-29	14
18-50	Flip Schulke (Flip Schulke Photojournalist), Frank Pugliese (General Electric Company), Robert S. Farrelly (Underwater Explorers Club), Robert J. Schmidt, Jr. (General Electric Company), R. Anderson (Miami, Florida)	1970-10-31	1970-11-06	6

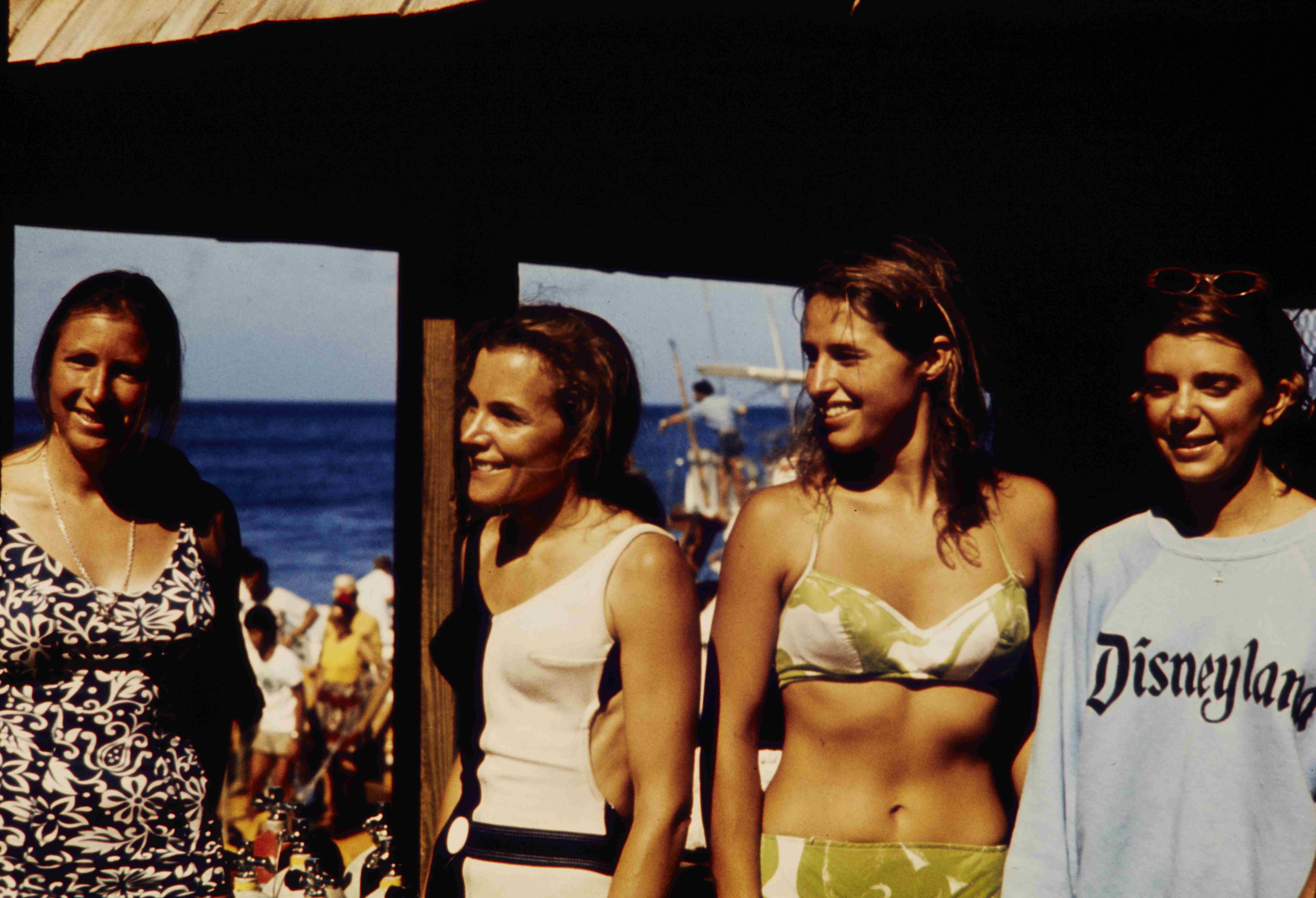
Tektite II mission 6-50 team

The fifth mission, designated Mission 6-50, was the first all-female saturation dive team. The elite team of scientist-divers included Renate Schlentz True of Tulane, team leader Sylvia Earle, Ann Hurley Hartline and Alina Szmant, graduate students at Scripps Institution of Oceanography, and Margaret Ann "Peggy" Lucas Bond, a Villanova electrical engineering graduate who served as Habitat Engineer.

The Tektite II missions were the first to undertake in-depth ecological studies from a saturation habitat. Ichthyologist and director of the Australian Museum, Frank Talbot, joined one of the missions. Medical and human research oversight for Tektite II was well documented in a series of reports covering a project overview, saturation diving, lessons learned from Tektite I, application to Tektite II, medical responsibilities and psychological monitoring, medical supervision duties medical and biological objectives project logistics, lessons learned, excursions to deeper depths from storage pressure, decompression tables, general medical observations, psychological observations, blood changes and general program conclusions.

== Ecology ==
There were nine studies on the ecology of coral reef fishes carried out during the Tektite series:

- influence of herbivores on marine plants
- bio-acoustic studies
- observations on cleaner shrimps
- isopods associated with reef fishes
- behavior of reef fishes in relation to fish pots
- bioturbation by the sand tilefish
- escape response in a damsel fish
- nocturnal-diurnal changeover in activity patterns, and
- space resource-sharing

== Physiology ==
A goal of the Tektite program was to prove that saturation diving techniques in an underwater laboratory, breathing a nitrogen-oxygen atmosphere could be safely and efficiently accomplished at a minimal cost.

Lambertsen's "Predictive Studies Series" that started with Tektite I in 1969 and ended in 1997, researched many aspects of human physiology in extreme environments.

== Tektite III ==
When Tektite II ended, General Electric placed the habitat in storage in Philadelphia. A group of interested parties purchased the habitat from General Electric for $1.00 with the stipulation it would be removed from the GE storage facility. The habitat was trucked across the United States to Fort Mason in San Francisco, where it was placed on display. Attempts were made to refurbish the habitat so it could be used in San Francisco Bay as a teaching tool.

By 1980, the habitat was fully restored and certified to be used underwater, and named Tektite III; however, funds for actually submerging and operating the habitat again were not available. While the habitat was on display at Fort Mason, many school children were taken through the habitat free of charge by volunteers. Lack of funds ended the project and the habitat was moved to storage along the Oakland Estuary in 1984. After several years, the habitat again deteriorated. In 1991, the habitat was dismantled by welding school students and the metal was recycled.

== See also ==
- Underwater habitat – Human habitable underwater enclosure filled with breathable gas
