= Lameshur, U.S. Virgin Islands =

Coordinates: 18°19′14″N 64°43′28″W

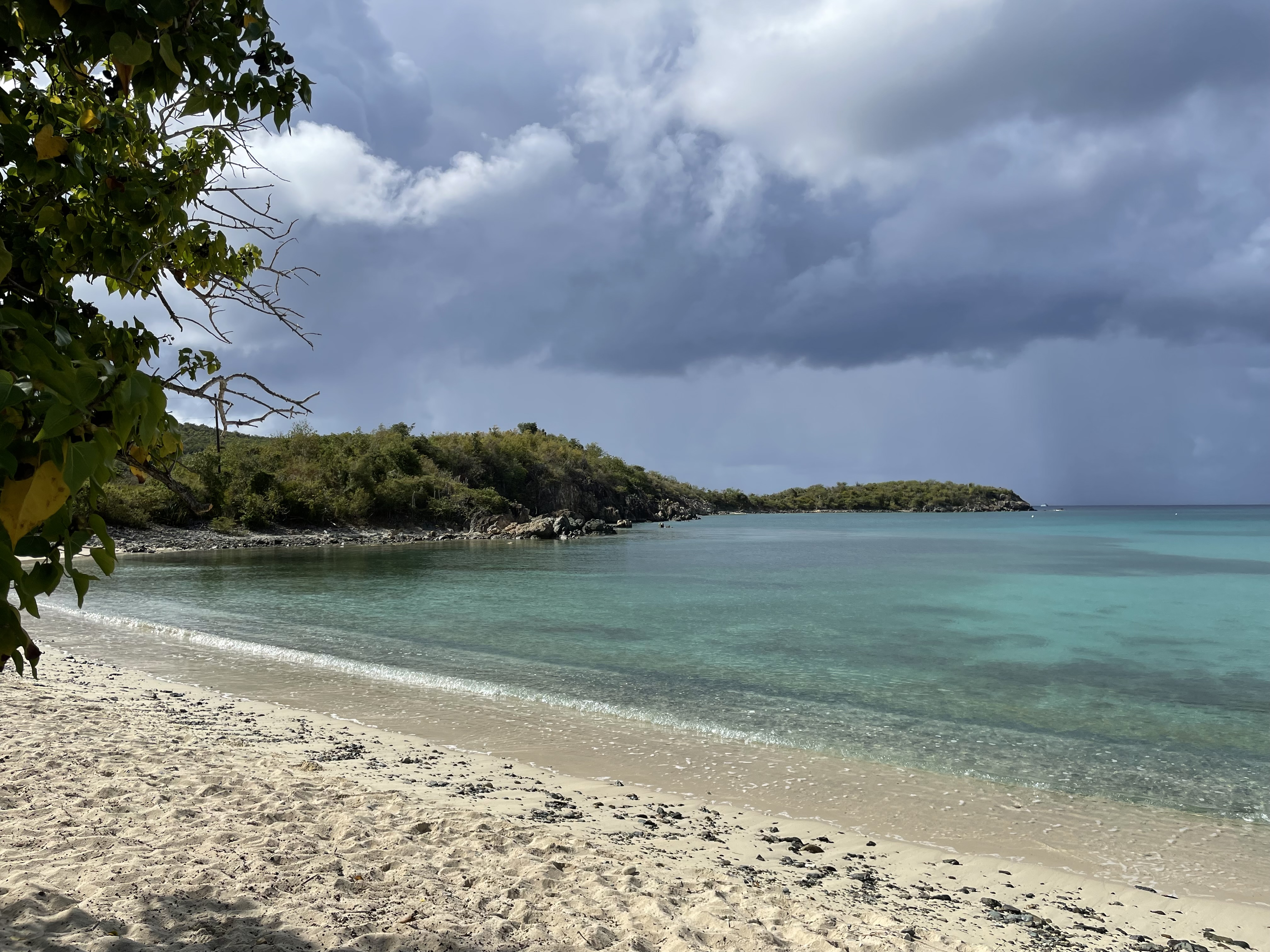
Yawzi Point and Little Lameshur Bay

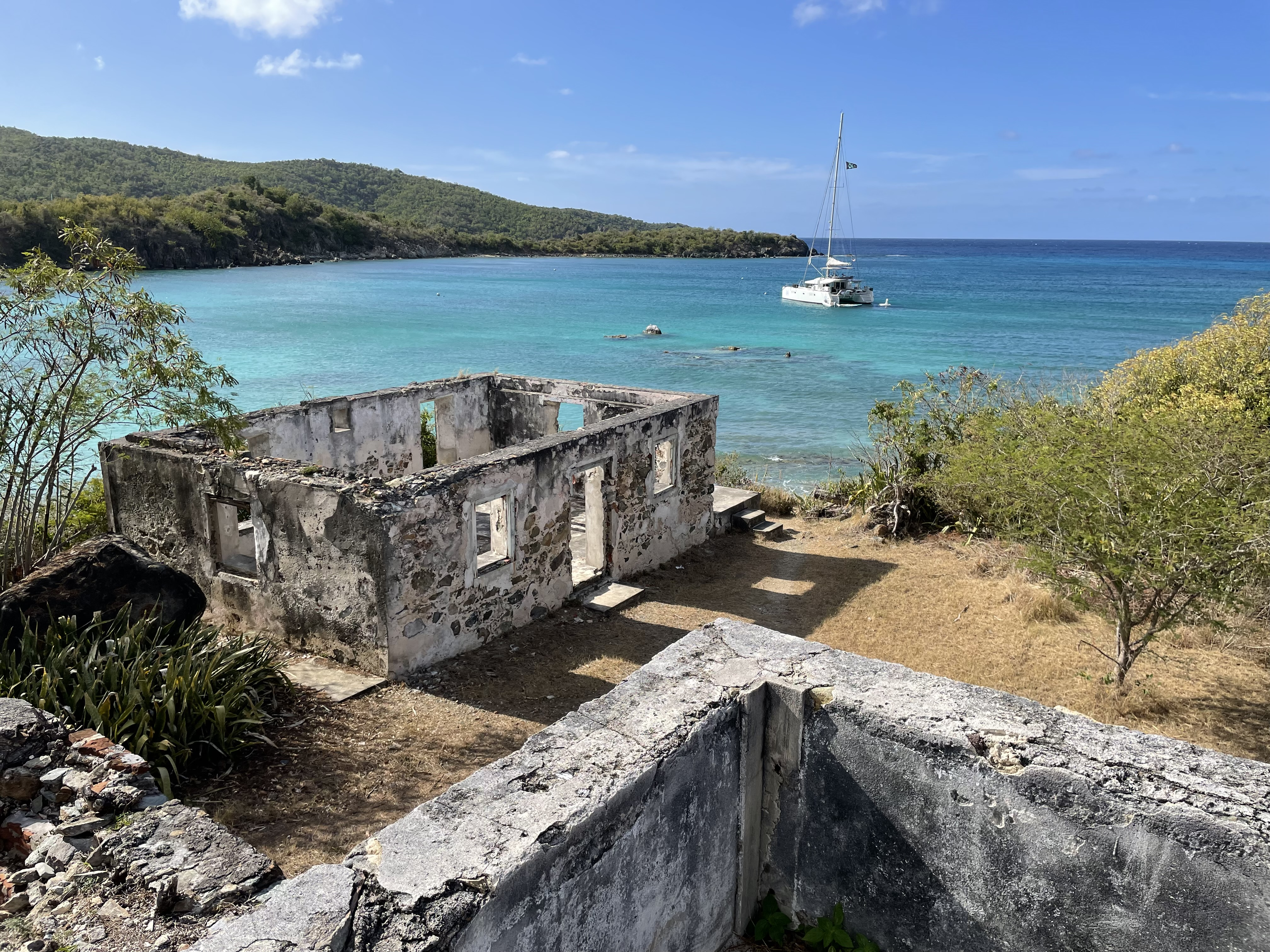
Lameshur Ruins

Lameshur is a former plantation on the island of Saint John in the United States Virgin Islands. It is inside Virgin Islands National Park and home to the Virgin Islands Environmental Resource Station (VIERS). The Tektite program placed two underwater habitats in Great Lameshur Bay and the Tektite Underwater Habitat Museum is located in the VIERS camp. The road to Lameshur is unmaintained and 4 wheel drive vehicles are often required. The University of the Virgin Islands has a research station and dock in Lameshur on Yawzi Point.

According to American author Lonzo Anderson, the name "Lameshur" was a corruption of "Limes ashore!", a phrase used by British sailors of long ago who took notice of the abundance of lime fruits in the area.
