= Ferring Pharmaceuticals =

Pharmaceutical multinational company

Ferring Holding SA
- Formerly: Nordiska Hormon Laboratoriet
- Type: Private limited company
- Traded as: not traded
- Industry: Pharmaceuticals
- Founded: 1950
- Headquarters: Saint-Prex, Switzerland
- Area served: Worldwide
- Key people: Jean-Frédéric Paulsen (Executive Chairman); Lars Rebien Sørensen (Vice Chairman); Frederik Paulsen Jr (Chairman Emeritus); Per Falk (President of the Executive Committee)
- Products: See below
- Revenue: EUR 2,3 billion (2022)
- Number of employees: 7,000 (2023)
- Subsidiaries: www.ferringusa.com, et al.
- Website: www.ferring.com

Ferring Pharmaceuticals is a Swiss multinational biopharmaceutical company specialising in areas such as reproductive health, maternal health, gastroenterology and urology. Ferring has been developing treatments for mothers and babies for over 50 years.

Headquartered in Saint-Prex, Switzerland, Ferring has its own manufacturing facilities in several European countries, in South America, China, India, and the United States.

Founded in 1950, privately owned Ferring employs over 7,000 employees worldwide, has its own operating subsidiaries in more than 50 countries and markets its products in over 100 countries.

== History ==
The company was founded by Dr. Frederik Paulsen Sr and Dr. Eva Paulsen in Malmö, Sweden, in 1950, initially as the Nordiska Hormon Laboratoriet, renamed Ferring in 1954. A ferring in Frisian is a person from the island Föhr off the western coast of Germany. Mr. Paulsen's family originates from that island.

The first major breakthrough was the synthetic production of oxytocin and vasopressin in 1961. With further growth and expansion, the headquarters moved to Copenhagen, Denmark, and subsequently to Switzerland.

In October 2011, Ferring acquired Cytokine PharmaSciences Inc. (CPSI) and its UK subsidiary Controlled Therapeutics (Scotland) Ltd., a global biopharmaceutical company with a particular focus in obstetrics.

In August 2016, the company announced it would acquire the phase III sciatica candidate drug – Condoliase (SI-6603) from Seikagaku for approximately $95 million.

In April 2018, Ferring announced its acquisition of Rebiotix Inc. an innovative biotechnology company and pioneer in the field of the human microbiome.

In November 2019, Ferring Pharmaceuticals and Blackstone Life Sciences announced the joint investment of over $570 million USD in an investigational novel gene therapy in late stage development for patients with high-grade, Bacillus Calmette-Guérin (BCG) unresponsive, non-muscle invasive bladder cancer (NMIBC). Ferring and Blackstone spun out a new gene therapy company called Fergene to bring the therapy to patients.

== Location ==
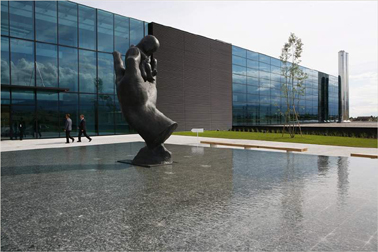
Ferring Pharmaceuticals, Global Headquarters in St-Prex, Switzerland.

Ferring Pharmaceuticals' global headquarters are located in Saint-Prex, Switzerland. The company has over 5,400 employees with manufacturing facilities in Europe, South America, China and has built two new facilities in the US and in India.

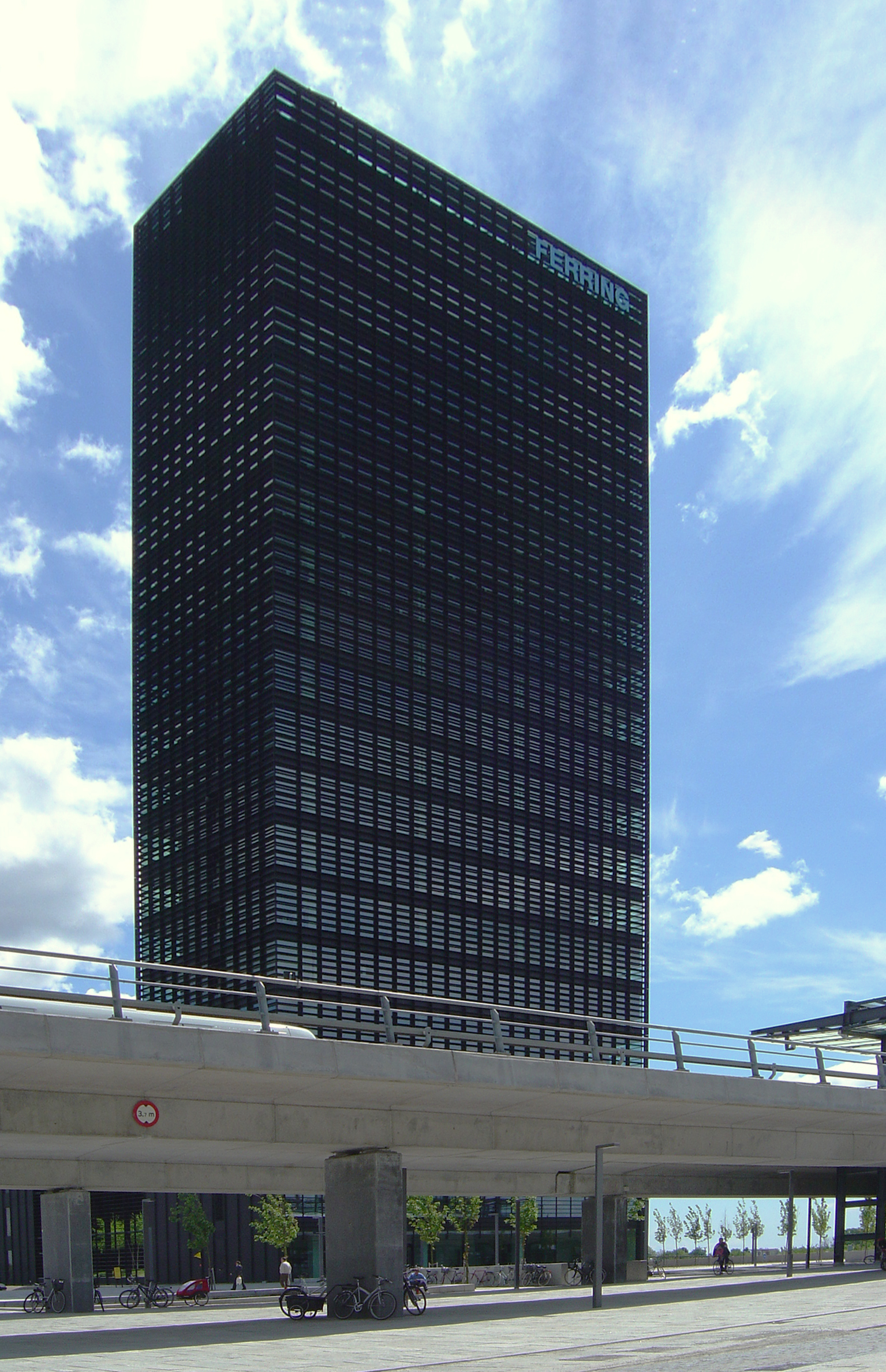
The former Ferring Tower in Ørestad

In Copenhagen, Ferring had a R&D centre in the Ferring Tower in Ørestad. The company commissioned Foster and Partners to design a new building in the Scanport development with area of 30,000 square metres (320,000 ft^{2}) and room for 750 employees. The Ferring Tower was sold to Genesta and rebranded as Public in 2021.

In Portugal, Ferring has built a "center of excellence" (2020) for the IT services and some shared functions.

Dutch subsidiary Ferring B.V. expanded to the US in 1980. Ferring established a research group at the Ferring Research Institute in San Diego, CA (USA) in 1996. Ferring assembled a peptide research group that collaborates with academic scientists. The Ferring Research Institute moved to its new home in San Diego in February 2009 with the opening of a 38,000-square-foot facility in Sorrento Valley. The new facility houses expanded research laboratories for peptide medicinal chemistry, biochemistry, bioanalytical, and pharmacology.

== Controversies ==
=== Ferring director's close ties to Russia ===
Since 2009 until 2022, Frederik Paulsen was the honorary consul of Russia in Lausanne, Switzerland and is reported to have a privileged relationship with the country and its president, Vladimir Putin.

According to an article published by Swiss newspaper, Le Temps, Frederik Paulsen accompanied on several occasions Swiss politicians to Russia such as Pascal Couchepin, Isabelle Chassot, François Longchamp, Géraldine Savary and Pascal Broulis.

The nature of these visits has been the object of criticism and interrogations by Swiss judicial authorities, who have launched investigations on Pascal Broulis and Géraldine Savary. The magistrate wished to clear if these trips were perceived as a bribe in return for fiscal arrangements for Frederik Paulsen and his company, Ferring Pharmaceuticals.

The year before, on 21 February 2008, Russian president Vladimir Putin awarded Frederik Paulsen with the Order of Friendship. Three other expedition members of Arktika 2007 were also awarded titles at the occasion. During the expedition, a Russian flag was planted on the ocean floor of the North Pole, which sparked up controversy.

=== Legal procedures against Ferring ===
In the past, Ferring has been accused of disclosing misleading information about several of its products (Desmopressin, Glypressin) at the benefit of consumers. Pentasa ad in UK journal failed to comply with publication regulations.

In July 2020, the Medicines and Healthcare products Regulatory Agency, based in the United Kingdom, drew attention to the fact that Ferring Pharmaceuticals is recalling all Desmopressin nasal sprays.

In 2016, a class action was filled against Ferring Pharmaceuticals regarding the Bravelle product. One year earlier, the company recalled Bravelle products after tests revealed that the drug was not as effective as declared, therefore exposing women to serious health risks.

Ferring Pharmaceuticals is currently engaged in a legal battle opposing it to Professor Claudio de Simone. In the early 1990s, Professor Claudio de Simone invented a probiotic formulation fighting against intestinal disorders. The "De Simone formula" was the subject of several clinical tests, attesting of its efficiency to treat certain diseases.

The pharmaceutical company distributed the formula under the name VSL#3. A few years after the end of the agreement between the two parties, Ferring Pharmaceuticals continued to distribute a product referred to as "VSL#3" in several countries, containing a modified formula.

== Products ==
Products are used in reproductive health, gastroenterology, urology, orthopaedics and endocrinology.

Reproductive medicine and maternal health / Fertility

- Triptorelin, which Ferring markets as Gonapeptyl or Decapeptyl in some countries
- Menopur/ Menogon/ Repronex is ovarian-stimulating treatment used in the preparation for in vitro fertilization;
- Propess for the induction of labour;
- Endometrin / Lutinus (progesterone)
- Tractocile (atosiban), to delay premature labor
- Pabal/ Duratocin/ Lonactene / Duratobal / (carbetocin) to prevent post-partum hemorrhage
- Choragon / Brevactid (u-hCG)
- Lutrepulse / Lutrelef (gonadorelin acetate)
- Norprolac (quinagolide hydrochloride);
- Rekovelle (follitropin delta);

Gastroenterology

- Pentasa for the treatment of inflammatory bowel disease
- Picoprep / Clenpiq
- Cortiment / Budesonide is indicated in adults for induction of remission in patients with active mild-to-moderate active ulcerative colitis
- Glypressin (terlipressin) is indicated for the treatment of bleeding oesophageal varices and in some countries for the treatment of hepato-renal syndrome type 1.
- Picoprep / Clenpiq (sodium picosulphate, magnesium oxide, citric acid) is indicated to clean the bowel
- Rebyota / Fecal_microbiota, live for the prevention of recurrence of Clostridioides difficile infection (CDI)

Urology

- Degarelix, marketed under the brandname Firmagon is a prostate cancer Gonadotrophin-releasing hormone blocker therapy
- Minirin for bedwetting in children and nocturia in adults;
- Nocdurna (desmopressin) is indicated for the symptomatic treatment of nocturia
- Testim (testosterone) is a testosterone replacement treatment
- Adstiladrin / Nadofaragene firadenovec is a gene therapy approved for bladder cancer

Orthopaedics

- Euflexxa for osteoarthritis of the knee

Endocrinology

- Zomacton, a recombinant human growth hormone used to treat growth failure in children

== See also ==
- List of pharmaceutical companies
- Pharmaceutical industry in Switzerland
