= Chengdu Kanghong Pharmaceutical Group =

Pharmaceutical Group

Chengdu Kanghong Pharmaceutical Group Co., Ltd. (Chinese: 成都康弘药业集团股份有限公司) is a publicly traded pharmaceutical company based in the province of Sichuan, China. It was founded in 1996 and researches, develops, manufactures, and distributes medicines for ophthalmic, central nervous, digestive and endocrine systems. The company is listed on the Shenzhen stock exchange with a market capitalization at around $6 billion.

As of May 2021, the company had 18 drugs on the market including Lumitin (conbercept). Additional products include Songling xuemaikang capsules, Keluoxin capsules, Xinluona (Mosapride Citrate), Bolexin (Venlafaxine hydrochloride capsules) and Bosiqing (Aripiprazole tablets), Yitaning (Dexzopiclone tablets), Shugan Jieyu (capsules), Danshu (capsules), and Yiqing (capsules). Kanghong also currently has 13 subsidiaries in China, Israel, and the United States.

== History ==
In 2005, Kanghong started development of the drug conbercept, which is used to treat age-related macular degeneration (AMD). In 2017, Kanghong acquired IOPtima, a subsidiary of BioLight Israeli Life Sciences Investment. Kanghong also became a distributor of IOPtima’s products in China.

In 2016, Kanghong received approval from the U.S. FDA to begin Phase III clinical trials of conbercept. In 2020, the company’s R&D investments were approximately 29% of its annual revenue, and by 2020, the company held 238 patents and exclusive patents for 13 drugs out of their 18 products.

As of December 2020, the company’s drugs in development are for treatment of various diseases and conditions including glioma, fundus disease tumors, diabetic macular edema (DME), and Type II diabetes.

During the COVID-19 pandemic, Kanghong donated money, protective clothing, and other materials to medical institutions across China through the China Red Cross Foundation.
