= Alkersum =

Alkersum Aalkersem
- Municipality
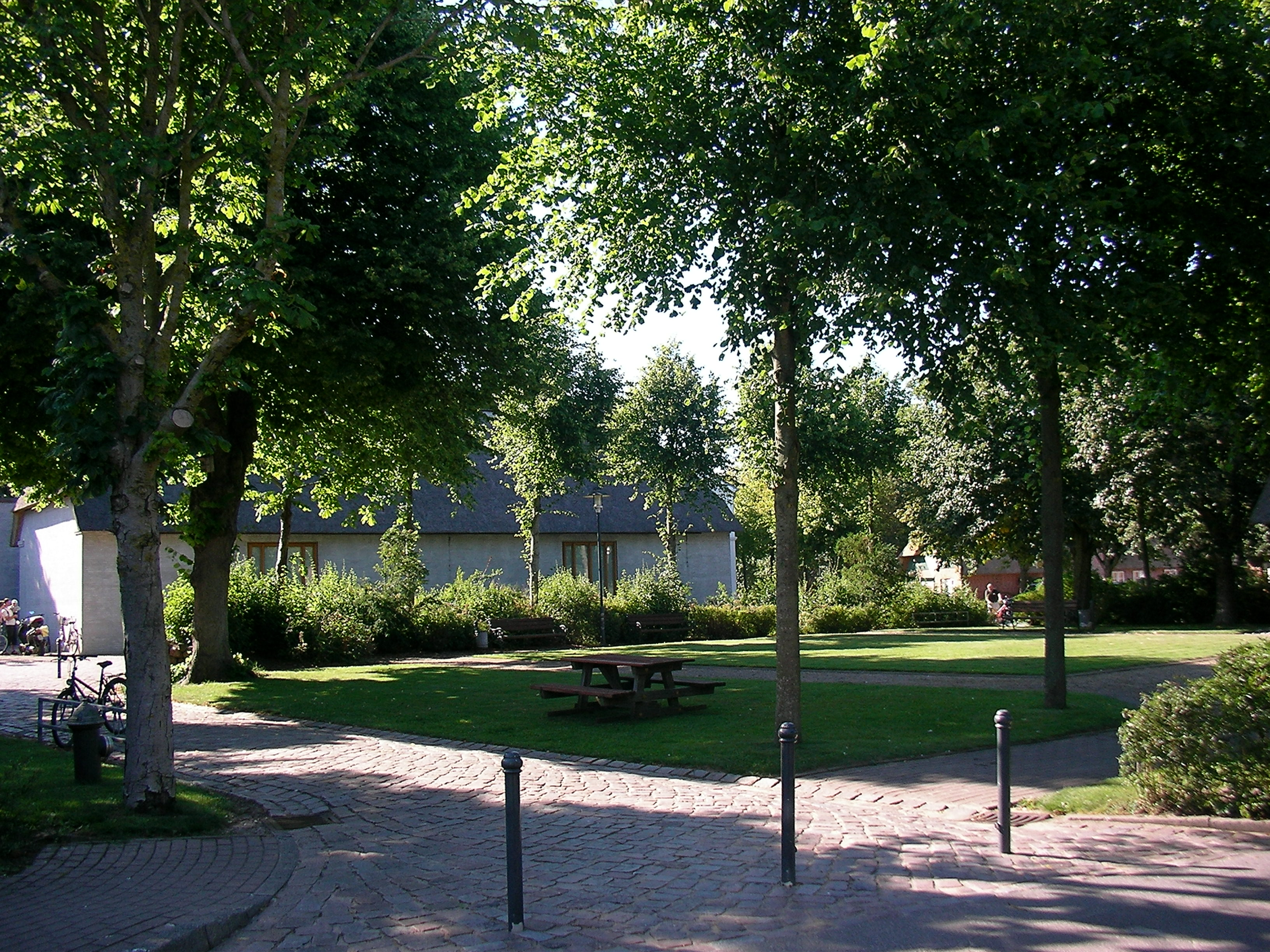
- A park in Alkersum

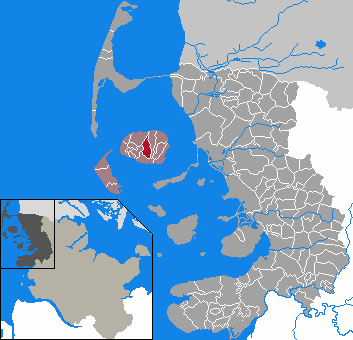
- Location of Alkersum; Aalkersem within Nordfriesland district
- Interactive map of Alkersum; Aalkersem
- Location within Germany Location within Schleswig-Holstein
- Coordinates: 54°42′35″N 8°30′46″E
- Country: Germany
- State: Schleswig-Holstein
- District: Nordfriesland
- Municipal assoc.: Föhr-Amrum

Government
  - Mayor: Ina Ketels

Area
  - Total: 9.07 km^{2} (3.50 sq mi)
- Elevation: 6 m (20 ft)

Population (2025-12-31)
  - Total: 407
  - Density: 44.9/km^{2} (116/sq mi)
- Time zone: UTC+01:00 (CET)
  - Summer (DST): UTC+02:00 (CEST)
- Postal codes: 25938
- Dialling codes: 04681
- Vehicle registration: NF
- Website: www.alkersum.de

Alkersum (Fering: Aalkersem, Danish: Alkersum) is a municipality in the Nordfriesland district, in Schleswig-Holstein, northern Germany.

== Geography ==
Alkersum is situated in the center of the island in the geestland of Föhr.

== History ==
First settlements in the area occurred in the Iron Age.

== Politics ==
Since the communal elections of 2008, the Alkersumer Wählergemeinschaft holds all nine seats in the municipality council.

== Economy ==
Several enterprises have settled in the outskirts of the village. Also tourism and horse ranches are an important factor.

== Culture ==
In August 2009 the Museum Kunst der Westküste (Museum of Fine Arts of the West Coast) opened in Alkersum. It displays artworks that focus on the North Sea and its shore. Notable artists include Edvard Munch, Emil Nolde, Max Liebermann and others.

== Notable people ==
- Frederik Paulsen (1909–1997), founder of Ferring Pharmaceuticals
