= Cormetasone =

Chemical compound

Clinical data
- Other names: Cormethasone; 6α,6β,9α-Trifluoro-11β,17α,21-trihydroxy-16α-methylpregna-1,4-diene-3,20-dione
- Drug class: Corticosteroid; Glucocorticoid

Identifiers
- IUPAC name: (8S,9R,10S,11S,13S,14S,16R,17R)-6,6,9-Trifluoro-11,17-dihydroxy-17-(2-hydroxyacetyl)-10,13,16-trimethyl-8,11,12,14,15,16-hexahydro-7H-cyclopenta[a]phenanthren-3-one
- CAS Number: 35135-68-3
- PubChem CID: 20055458
- ChemSpider: 16736900
- UNII: SKF3NCF20A
- CompTox Dashboard (EPA): DTXSID20188632

Chemical and physical data
- Formula: C_{22}H_{27}F_{3}O_{5}
- Molar mass: 428.448 g·mol^{−1}
- 3D model (JSmol): Interactive image
- SMILES: C[C@@H]1C[C@H]2[C@@H]3CC(C4=CC(=O)C=C[C@@]4([C@]3([C@H](C[C@@]2([C@]1(C(=O)CO)O)C)O)F)C)(F)F
- InChI: InChI=1S/C22H27F3O5/c1-11-6-13-14-8-20(23,24)15-7-12(27)4-5-18(15,2)21(14,25)16(28)9-19(13,3)22(11,30)17(29)10-26/h4-5,7,11,13-14,16,26,28,30H,6,8-10H2,1-3H3/t11-,13+,14+,16+,18+,19+,21+,22+/m1/s1; Key:QVTPFMPYKMLGGK-QPZANWORSA-N

Cormetasone, or cormethasone, is a synthetic glucocorticoid corticosteroid which was never marketed.
