= Conbercept =

Pharmaceutical drug

Clinical data
- Trade names: Lumitin
- Routes of administration: Intravitreal Injection

Identifiers
- CAS Number: 1227158-72-6
- DrugBank: DB12460
- UNII: 1P05PW62F3

Chemical and physical data
- Molar mass: 142 KDa

Conbercept, sold under the commercial name Lumitin, is a novel vascular endothelial growth factor (VEGF) inhibitor used to treat neovascular age-related macular degeneration (AMD) and diabetic macular edema (DME). The anti-VEGF was approved for the treatment of neovascular AMD by the China State FDA (CFDA) in December 2013. As of December 2020, conbercept is undergoing phase III clinical trials through the U.S. Food and Drug Administration's PANDA-1 and PANDA-2 development programs.

Conbercept was developed by Chengdu Kanghong Biotech Company in the People's Republic of China and is marketed under the name Lumitin.

== Medical uses ==
It is used for the treatment of neovascular age-related macular degeneration (nAMD), choroidal neovascularization secondary to pathologic myopia (pmCNV), diabetic macular edema (DME). The medication is given through intravitreal injection (IVT).

== Contraindications ==
Conbercept is contraindicated in patients with known hypersensitivity to the active ingredient, in patients with ocular or periocular infections, and in patients with active intraocular inflammation.

== Adverse effects ==
Common adverse effects of the eye formulation include eye pain, transient intraocular pressure (IOP) increase and conjunctival hemorrhage.

== Mechanism of action ==
Conbercept is a soluble receptor decoy that binds specifically to VEGF-B, placental growth factor (PlGF), and various isoforms of VEGF-A. Conbercept has a VEGF-R2 kinase insert domain receptor (KDR) Ig-like region 4 (KDRd4) which improves the three-dimensional structure and efficiency of dimer formation, thereby increasing the binding capacity of conbercept to VEGF.

== Composition ==
Conbercept is a recombinant fusion protein composed of VEGFR-1 (second domain) and VEGFR-2 (third and fourth domains) regions fused to the Fc portion of human IgG1 immunoglobulin.

== History ==
Chengdu Kanghong Pharmaceutical Group, a medical company based in Sichuan, started the development of conbercept in 2005. In 2012, the drug was included on the World Health Organization's Drug Information 67th List of Recommended International Nonproprietary Names, which was the first Chinese innovator biotech drug to be recognized on the list.

In November 2013, the Chinese Food and Drug Administration approved conbercept for the treatment of AMD. By 2014, conbercept was marketed for treatment of wAMD in China. In 2016, Phase III clinical trials of conbercept were authorized by the U.S. Food and Drug Administration.

In 2017, Kanghong Pharmaceutical Group partnered with Syneos Health to process Phase III clinical trials simultaneously in more than 30 countries around the world with an investment of $228 million. In 2020, conbercept was approved for use in Mongolia.

=== Clinical trials in China ===
- Conbercept is the only anti-VEGF drug confirmed by randomized controlled trials (RCT) to sustain visual improvements with 3+Q3M regimens (PHOENIX study)
- Conbercept significantly improves visual acuity and anatomical outcomes in patient with PCV (AURORA Study).
- Conbercept provides significantly visual acuity improvement in DME patients (SAILING study).

== Society and culture ==
=== Legal Status ===
- In 2013, the CFDA approved conbercept for the treatment of neovascular age-related macular degeneration (nAMD)
- In 2017, the CFDA approved it for the treatment of pathologic myopia associated choroidal neovascularization (pmCNV)
- In 2019, the CFDA approved it for the treatment of diabetic macular edema (DME)

=== Economic ===
- Conbercept has been shown to be a cost-effective wAMD treatment option in China. Compared to two similar anti-VEGF intravitreal drugs, ranibizumab and aflibercept, conbercept has been shown to be the most cost-effective option for treatment of wAMD in China.
- In 2017, the national basic medical insurance in China began covering conbercept.
