= Cold capsule =

Cold symptom capsules

Cold Capsule IV and Cold Capsule V were extended release oral capsules (pill) used to control cold symptoms.

== Composition ==
Both products contained chlorpheniramine maleate (an antihistamine) and phenylpropanolamine hydrochloride (a decongestant) but differed in their doses. Both products contained 75 mg of phenylpropanolamine hydrochloride, but Cold Capsule IV contained 12 mg chlorpheniramine maleate while Cold Capsule V had 8 mg .

== History ==
They were manufactured by Graham DM and both approved for use by the U.S. Food and Drug Administration in 1985.

In 2000, the FDA issued an advisory for all products containing phenylpropanolamine due to the risk of stroke and recommended their recall. Both Cold Capsule products are since discontinued.
