= Frederik Paulsen Sr =

Dr Frederik Paulsen Sr (born Friedrich Paulsen; 31 July 1909, in Dagebüll – 3 June 1997 in Alkersum) was a German-Swedish medical doctor and the founder of Ferring Pharmaceuticals.

Friedrich Paulsen was born in the tiny port hamlet of Dagebüll on the North Frisian coast. Both his parents originated from the neighbouring island of Föhr.

In 1933 during his studies in Kiel, Paulsen suffered harassment and threats from National Socialists due to his political beliefs. Therefore, he fled to Malmö, Sweden via Basel in Switzerland to avoid his internment at a concentration camp. He acquired his Swedish citizenship in 1941, and established Ferring Pharmaceuticals (1950) using his research on hormones and their synthetic production. He was one of the first people to synthesize the human hormones oxytocin and vasopressin.

Upon accepting the Swedish citizenship he changed his given name Friedrich to Frederik. He and his first wife Margareta Liljequist (1920–2006; m. 1939) had six children.

After his withdrawal from the company's management he retired to Alkersum, Föhr with his second wife, Dr. Eva Wolf Frandsen. He became active in the preservation of the Frisian language and culture, and established the Ferring Stiftung in 1988. Frederik Paulsen died in Alkersum on Föhr on Jun 3 1997, aged nearly 88. His youngest son, Frederik Paulsen Jr, is the current chairman of Ferring Pharmaceuticals.

== Other sources ==
- Ferring Pharmaceuticals biography
- Haug, Karin (June 8, 2005). "Editorial piece by NDR1 radio station on Frederik Paulsen's work" (in German).
