= Cortisuzol =

Chemical compound

Clinical data
- Trade names: Solu-Altim
- Other names: RU-16999; 11β,17α,21-Trihydroxy-6,16α-dimethyl-2'-phenyl-2'H-pregna-2,4,6-trieno[3,2-c]pyrazol-20-one 21-(m-sulfobenzoate)
- Drug class: Corticosteroid; Glucocorticoid

Identifiers
- IUPAC name: 4-({2-[(1R,2R,3aS,3bS,10aR,10bS,11S,12aS)-1,11-Dihydroxy-2,5,10a,12a-tetramethyl-7-phenyl-1,2,3,3a,3b,7,10,10a,10b,11,12,12a-dodecahydrocyclopenta[5,6]naphtho[1,2-f]indazol-1-yl]-2-oxoethoxy}carbonyl)benzenesulfonic acid
- CAS Number: 50801-44-0
- PubChem CID: 3037936
- ChemSpider: 16736901
- UNII: 1PA76KJ99Y
- ChEMBL: ChEMBL2106054
- CompTox Dashboard (EPA): DTXSID60198831

Chemical and physical data
- Formula: C_{37}H_{40}N_{2}O_{8}S
- Molar mass: 672.79 g·mol^{−1}
- 3D model (JSmol): Interactive image
- SMILES: C[C@@H]1C[C@H]2[C@@H]3C=C(C4=CC5=C(C[C@@]4([C@H]3[C@H](C[C@@]2([C@]1(C(=O)COC(=O)C6=CC(=CC=C6)S(=O)(=O)O)O)C)O)C)C=NN5C7=CC=CC=C7)C
- InChI: InChI=1S/C37H40N2O8S/c1-21-13-27-29-14-22(2)37(43,32(41)20-47-34(42)23-9-8-12-26(15-23)48(44,45)46)36(29,4)18-31(40)33(27)35(3)17-24-19-38-39(30(24)16-28(21)35)25-10-6-5-7-11-25/h5-13,15-16,19,22,27,29,31,33,40,43H,14,17-18,20H2,1-4H3,(H,44,45,46)/t22-,27+,29+,31+,33-,35+,36+,37+/m1/s1; Key:ZKIDWWQMNXGYHV-BYJSBFAFSA-N

Cortisuzol (brand name Solu-Altim; developmental code name RU-16999) is a synthetic glucocorticoid corticosteroid.
