= Concizumab =

Medication

Monoclonal antibody
- Type: Whole antibody
- Source: Humanized
- Target: Tissue factor pathway inhibitor

Clinical data
- Trade names: Alhemo
- Other names: concizumab-mtci
- AHFS/Drugs.com: Monograph
- MedlinePlus: a625040
- License data: US DailyMed: Concizumab
- Pregnancy category: AU: D
- Routes of administration: Subcutaneous
- Drug class: Antihemorrhagic
- ATC code: B02BX10 (WHO)

Legal status
- Legal status: AU: S4 (Prescription only); CA: ℞-only / Schedule D; US: ℞-only; EU: Rx-only

Identifiers
- CAS Number: 1312299-39-0
- DrugBank: DB12820
- UNII: 68603V9EAF
- KEGG: D11847

Chemical and physical data
- Formula: C_{6462}H_{10004}N_{1712}O_{2046}S_{46}
- Molar mass: 145887.81 g·mol^{−1}

Concizumab, sold under the brand name Alhemo, is a monoclonal antibody used for the treatment of hemophilia A and hemophilia B. It is an anti-tissue factor pathway inhibitor.

The most common adverse reactions include injection site reactions and hives (urticaria). Concizumab can cause thromboembolic events, hypersensitivity, and increased laboratory values of fibrin D dimer and prothrombin fragment 1+2.

Concizumab was approved for medical use in Canada in March 2023, in Australia in July 2023, in the European Union in December 2024, and the United States in December 2024.

== Medical uses ==
Concizumab is indicated for routine prophylaxis to prevent or reduce the frequency of bleeding episodes in people aged twelve years of age and older with hemophilia A (congenital factor VIII deficiency) with factor VIII inhibitors; or hemophilia B (congenital factor IX deficiency) with factor IX inhibitors. In July 2025, the indication was expanded by the US Food and Drug Administration to include the treatment of people with hemophilia A or hemophilia B without inhibitors.

== History ==
The efficacy and safety of concizumab were evaluated in a multi-national, multi-center, open-label, phase III trial (NCT04083781) with 91 adult and 42 adolescent male participants with hemophilia A or B with inhibitors who have been prescribed, or are in need of, treatment with therapies that bypass the inhibitor effect. The US Food and Drug Administration (FDA) approved concizumab based on evidence from one clinical trial of 133 participants with hemophilia A with inhibitors (HAwI) and hemophilia B with inhibitors (HBwI). The trial was conducted at 69 sites in a total of 26 countries in North America, Europe, Africa, Asia, and Oceania of which the majority (95%, 126 participants) were from outside the United States. The same trial was used to evaluate the safety of concizumab. The Explorer7 trial (NCT04083781), was a multi-national, multi-center, open-label, phase III trial that investigated the safety and efficacy of concizumab for routine prophylaxis in 91 adults (58 participants with HAwI and 33 participants with HBwI) and 42 adolescents (22 participants with HAwI and 20 participants with HBwI). All participants were prescribed, or were in need of, treatment with bypassing agents.

The FDA granted the application for concizumab priority review, breakthrough therapy, and orphan drug designations.

== Society and culture ==
=== Legal status ===
Concizumab was approved for medical use in Canada in March 2023, in Australia in July 2023, in the European Union in December 2024, and the United States in December 2024.

In October 2024, the Committee for Medicinal Products for Human Use of the European Medicines Agency adopted a positive opinion, recommending the granting of a marketing authorization for the medicinal product Alhemo, intended for the prevention of bleeding in people with hemophilia A and FVIII inhibitors or hemophilia B and FIX inhibitors. The applicant for this medicinal product is Novo Nordisk A/S. Concizumab was authorized for medical use in the European Union in December 2024.

=== Names ===
Concizumab is the international nonproprietary name.

Concizumab is sold under the brand name Alhemo.
