= Conatumumab =

Monoclonal antibody

Monoclonal antibody
- Type: Whole antibody
- Source: Human
- Target: TRAIL-R2 (CD262)

Clinical data
- Other names: anti-TRAIL receptor 2 monoclonal antibody, AMG-655
- ATC code: none

Identifiers
- CAS Number: 896731-82-1
- ChemSpider: none
- UNII: 1P48L61KM0
- KEGG: D09329

Chemical and physical data
- Formula: C_{6466}H_{10006}N_{1730}O_{2024}S_{40}
- Molar mass: 145645.66 g·mol^{−1}

Conatumumab (originally AMG-655) is a monoclonal antibody developed for the treatment of cancer. It is a fully human monoclonal agonist antibody directed against the extracellular domain of human TRAIL (tumor necrosis factor-related apoptosis-inducing ligand) receptor 2 (TR-2, death receptor 5, TNFRSF10B) with potential antineoplastic activity. Conatumumab mimics the activity of native TRAIL, binding to and activating TR-2, thereby activating caspase cascades and inducing tumor cell apoptosis. TR-2 is expressed by a variety of solid tumors and cancers of hematopoietic origin.

The drug was developed by Amgen Inc. In 2008, Takeda licensed the drug from Amgen for development in Japan, but discontinued development in 2011.
