= Probenecid and colchicine =

Combination medication

Probenecid with colchicine is a combination medication used to treat gout. Brand names include ColBenemid, Col-Probenecid, and Proben-C.
