= Conorfone =

Opioid analgesic drug

Clinical data
- ATC code: None

Identifiers
- IUPAC name: (5α,8β)-17-(Cyclopropylmethyl)-8-ethyl-3-methoxy-4,5-epoxymorphinan-6-one
- CAS Number: 72060-05-0
- PubChem CID: 172964
- ChemSpider: 151049
- UNII: 9H58696D23
- ChEMBL: ChEMBL2106064

Chemical and physical data
- Formula: C_{23}H_{29}NO_{3}
- Molar mass: 367.489 g·mol^{−1}
- 3D model (JSmol): Interactive image
- SMILES: O=C4[C@@H]5Oc1c2c(ccc1OC)CC3N(CC[C@]25[C@H]3[C@@H](CC)C4)CC6CC6
- InChI: InChI=1S/C23H29NO3/c1-3-14-11-17(25)22-23-8-9-24(12-13-4-5-13)16(19(14)23)10-15-6-7-18(26-2)21(27-22)20(15)23/h6-7,13-14,16,19,22H,3-5,8-12H2,1-2H3/t14-,16?,19-,22-,23-/m0/s1; Key:JMPUQJQXECRLKY-MNABOLNXSA-N

Conorfone (INN; TR-5109), also known as conorphone and codorphone, as well as conorphone hydrochloride (USAN), is an opioid analgesic that was never marketed. It is an analogue of hydrocodone substituted with an 8-ethyl group and an N-cyclopropylmethyl group. It acts as a mixed agonist-antagonist at the μ-opioid receptor, and is slightly more potent than codeine in analgesic effects, but associated with somewhat greater side effects.

== Synthesis ==

Exposure of thebaine (1) to mild acid leads to hydrolysis of the enol ether function, followed by migration of the double bond to yield the conjugated enone (2). Addition of lithium diethylcuprate proceeds by 1,4-addition from the less hindered side to give the intermediate (3). Treatment of that with cyanogen bromide under von Braun reaction conditions leads to the isolable aminocyanide. This is the converted to the secondary amine (4) by treatment with aqueous base. Alkylation of that intermediate with cyclopropylmethyl chloride yields the analgesic codorphone.

== See also ==
- Hydrocodone
