= Condoliase =

Pharmaceutical drug

Clinical data
- Trade names: Hernicore
- Other names: Chondroitinase ABC; SI-6603

Legal status
- Legal status: Rx in Japan

Identifiers
- CAS Number: 9024-13-9
- DrugBank: DB12793
- UNII: 7SI2UZG934
- KEGG: D09800
- ChEMBL: ChEMBL2107876
- ECHA InfoCard: 100.029.785

Chemical and physical data
- Formula: C_{5039}H_{7770}N_{1360}O_{1525}S_{22}
- Molar mass: 112508.90 g·mol^{−1}

Condoliase (Hernicore) is a biopharmaceutical peptide for the treatment of lumbar disc herniation. Clinical trials have shown its benefit in alleviation of lumbar disc herniation associated low back pain and disability, although some concerns have been suggested with regard to promotion of disc degeneration.

Condoliase is derived from the enzyme mucopolysaccharidase from the Gram-negative bacteria Proteus vulgaris. It functions as an enzymatic chemonucleolysis product, specifically designed to reduce the size of the protruded herniation. It is an enzyme that specifically degrades glycosaminoglycans.

It was approved for use in Japan in 2018 as a treatment for lumbar disc herniation.
