= Sylvia Earle =

American marine biologist and oceanographer

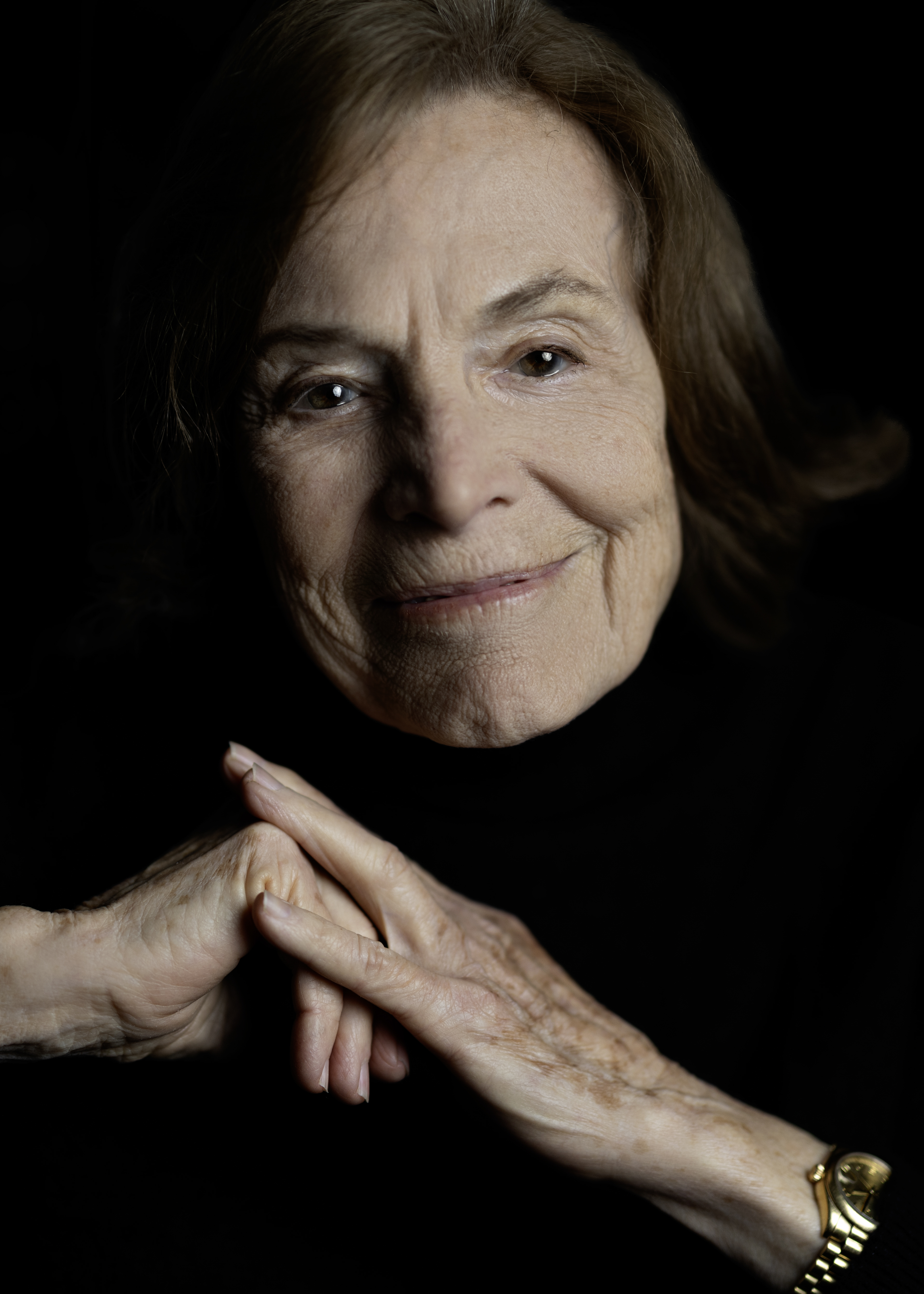
- Earle in 2026
- Born: Sylvia Alice Earle; August 30, 1935 (age 91); Gibbstown, New Jersey, U.S.
- Education: Florida State University; Duke University
- Spouses: John Taylor (m. 1957; div. 1963) Giles Mead (m. 1966; div. 1975) Graham Hawkes (m. 1986; div. 1992)
- Children: 3
- Awards: TED Prize (2009); National Women's Hall of Fame; Doctor of Science, University of Edinburgh (2018); Princess of Asturias Awards (2018)
- Scientific career
- Fields: Oceanography; Marine Conservation
- Workplaces: NOAA, National Geographic
- Thesis: Phaeophyta of Eastern Gulf of Mexico
- Author abbrev. (zoology): Earle

Sylvia Alice Earle (born August 30, 1935) is an American marine biologist, oceanographer, explorer, writer, and lecturer. She has been a National Geographic Explorer at Large (formerly Explorer in Residence) since 1998. Earle was the first chief scientist of the U.S. National Oceanic and Atmospheric Administration, and was named by Time Magazine as its first Hero for the Planet in 1998.

Earle is part of the group Ocean Elders, which is dedicated to protecting the ocean and its wildlife.

Earle gained a large amount of publicity when she was featured in Seaspiracy (2021), a Netflix Original documentary by British filmmaker Ali Tabrizi.

Earle eats a vegetarian diet. She describes the chemical build-up in carnivorous fish, the 90% depletion of populations of large fish, and references the health of oceans in her dietary decision. Also, she describes the seafood industry as "factory ships vacuuming up fish and everything else in their path. That's like using bulldozers to kill songbirds…".

In a discussion at the Good Food Conference in California, Earle warns of disappearing fish stocks, and that while coastal people's diets have included seafood for centuries, the commercial fishing industry no longer makes sense. She encourages transitions to plant-based diets as a solution.

== Early life and education ==
Earle was born in 1935 in the Gibbstown section of Greenwich Township, Gloucester County, New Jersey, to Alice Freas (Richie) Earle and Lewis Reade Earle. Both her parents were enthusiastic about the outdoors and supportive of their daughter's early interests in the natural world. The family moved to Dunedin on the western coast of Florida during Earle's childhood. Earle received an associate degree from St. Petersburg Jr. College (1952), a Bachelor of Science degree from Florida State University (1955), a Master of Science (1956) and a Doctorate of Phycology (1966) from Duke University.

Sylvia Earle's life work has been shaped directly by Rachel Carson, whose talent she rhapsodizes about in the Introduction to the 2018 edition of Carson's 1951 best-seller, The Sea Around Us.

"Most remarkable to me is what she did imagine. Her writings are so sensitive to the feelings of fish, birds and other animals that she could put herself in their place, buoyed by the air or by water, gliding over and under the ocean's surface. She conveyed the sense that she was the living ocean…"

== Career ==
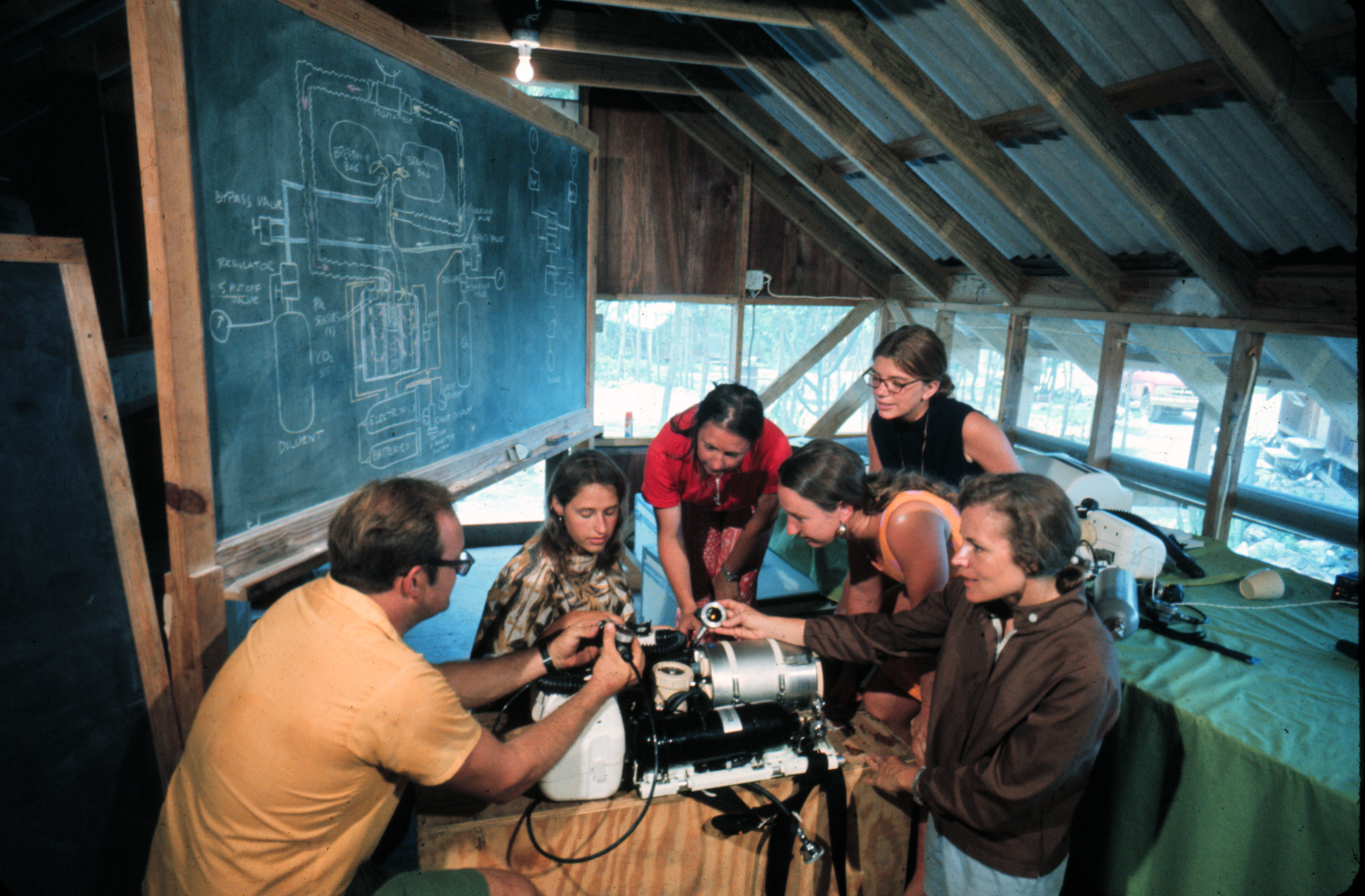
TEKTITE-II all-female team, led by Earle, in rebreather training in 1970

Earle was a Radcliffe Institute Scholar (1967–1969) and a research fellow at Harvard University (1967–1981). After receiving her Ph.D. in 1966, she spent a year as a research fellow at Harvard, then returned to Florida as the resident director of the Cape Haze Marine Laboratory.

Earle was a research associate at the University of California, Berkeley (1969–1981). In 1969, she applied to join the Tektite Project, an installation fifty feet below the surface of the sea off the coast of the Virgin Islands which allowed scientists to live submersed in their area of study for up to several weeks. Although she had logged more than 1,000 research hours underwater, Earle was rejected from the program. The next year, she was selected to lead the first all-female team of aquanauts in Tektite II.

Earle was the Curator of Phycology at the California Academy of Sciences (1979–1986). In 1979, she made an open-ocean JIM suit dive, untethered, to the sea ocean floor near Oahu. She set the women's depth record of 381 metres (1,250 ft) which still holds to date. In 1979 she also began her tenure as the Curator of Phycology at the California Academy of Sciences, where she served until 1986.

From 1980 to 1984, she served on the National Advisory Committee on Oceans and Atmosphere.

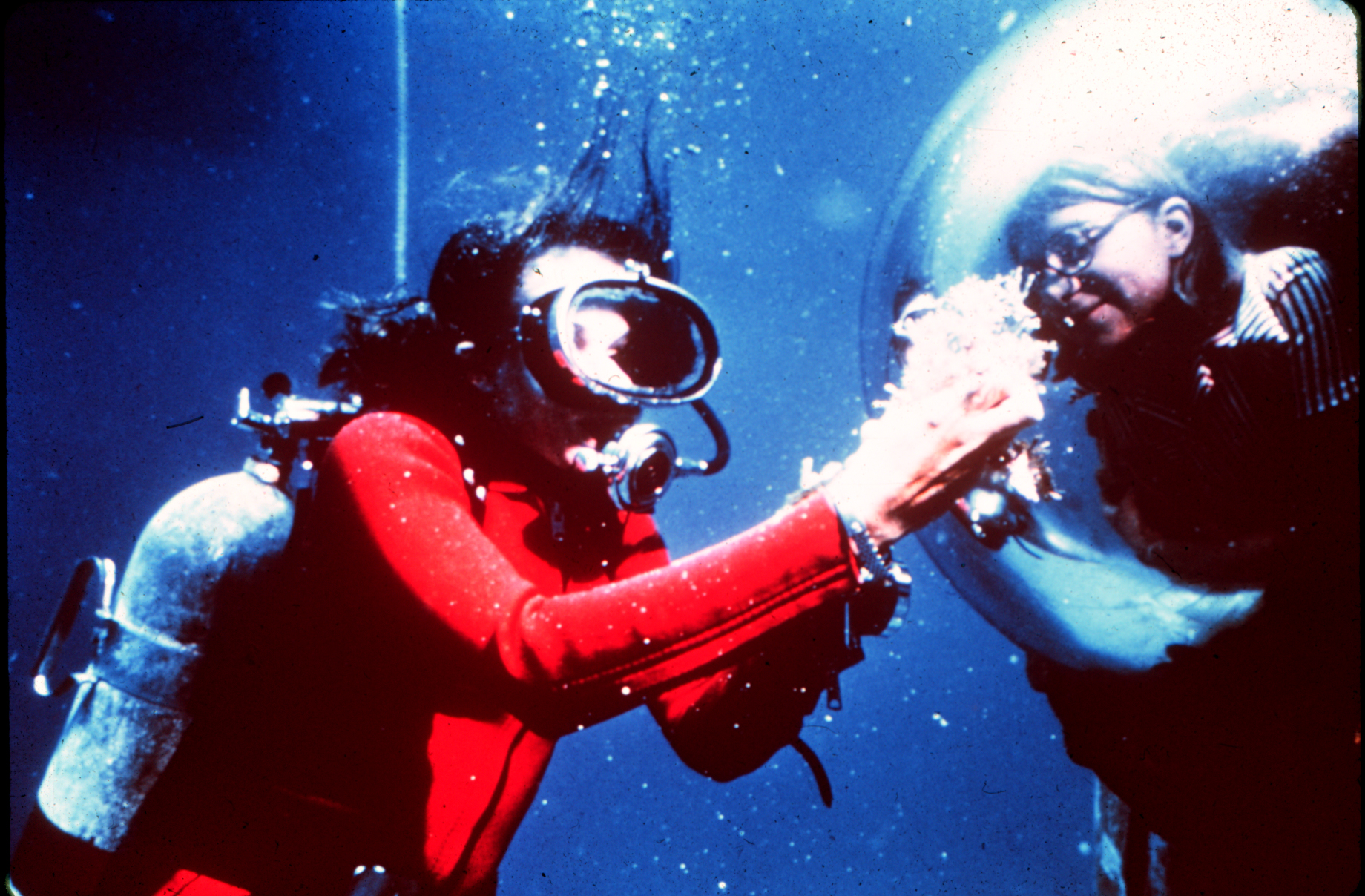
Earle displays samples to an aquanaut inside the Tektite habitat in 1970

In 1982 she and her later husband, Graham Hawkes, an engineer and submersible designer, founded Deep Ocean Engineering to design, operate, support and consult on piloted and robotic subsea systems. In 1985, the Deep Ocean Engineering team designed and built the Deep Rover research submarine, which operates down to 1,000 metres (3,300 ft). By 1986, Deep Rover had been tested and Earle joined the team conducting training off Lee Stocking Island in the Bahamas.

Earle left the company in 1990 to accept an appointment as Chief Scientist at the National Oceanic and Atmospheric Administration, where she stayed until 1992. She was the first woman to hold that position. During this post, given her expertise on the impact of oil spills, Earle was called upon to lead several research trips during the Persian Gulf War in 1991 to determine the environmental damage caused by Iraq's destruction of Kuwaiti oil wells.

In 1992, Earle founded Deep Ocean Exploration and Research (DOER Marine) to further advance marine engineering. The company, now run by Earle's daughter Elizabeth, designs, builds, and operates equipment for deep-ocean environments.

In 1998, Earle received the title National Geographic Explorer in Residence and now holds the title 'Explorer at Large'. She is sometimes called "Her Deepness" or "The Sturgeon General".

From 1998 to 2002, she led the Sustainable Seas Expeditions, a five-year program sponsored by the National Geographic Society and funded by the Richard and Rhoda Goldman Fund to study the United States National Marine Sanctuary. During this time, Earle was a leader of the Sustainable Seas Expeditions, council chair for the Harte Research Institute for the Gulf of Mexico Studies at Texas A&M-Corpus Christi, and chair of the Advisory Council for the Ocean in Google Earth. She also provided the DeepWorker 2000 submersible used to quantify the species of fish as well as the space resources utilized within the Stellwagen Bank National Marine Sanctuary.

In 2001, Earle received the National Parks Conservation Association's Robin W. Winks Award For Enhancing Public Understanding of National Parks.

Earle founded Mission Blue (also known as the Sylvia Earle Alliance, Deep Search Foundation, and Deep Search) in 2009.

In 2009, she also received the 100k TED prize which allowed her to continue her ocean advocacy work.

Given her past experience with the Exxon Valdez and Mega Borg oil spills, Earle was called to consult during the Deepwater Horizon Disaster in the Gulf of Mexico in 2010. During this year she also gave a 14-minute speech in front of 3,500 delegates and United Nations ambassadors at The Hague International Model United Nations Conference.

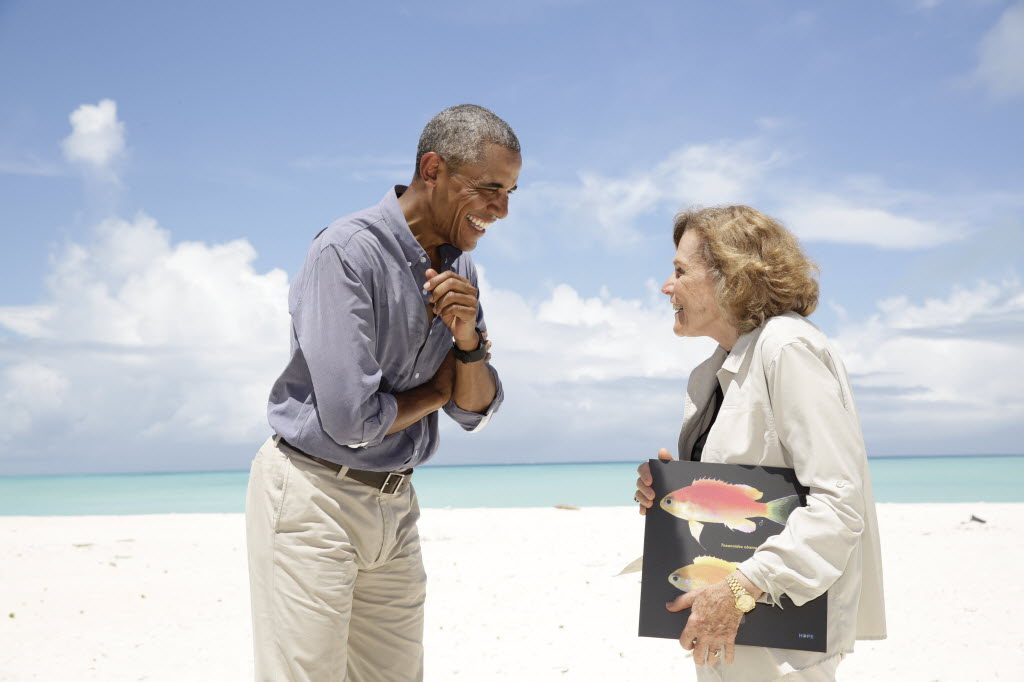
President Barack Obama talks with Dr. Sylvia Earle, during a visit to Midway Atoll, Sept. 1, 2016. Dr. Earle shows the President a photo of a newly discovered species of blue fish native to Midway waters.

In July 2012, Earle led an expedition to NOAA's Aquarius underwater laboratory, located off Key Largo, Florida. The expedition, entitled "Celebrating 50 Years of Living Beneath The Sea", commemorated the fiftieth anniversary of Jacques Cousteau's Conshelf I project and investigated coral reefs and ocean health. Mark Patterson co-led the expedition with Earle. Their aquanaut team also included underwater filmmaker D.J. Roller and oceanographer M. Dale Stokes.

Earle made a cameo appearance in the daily cartoon strip Sherman's Lagoon in the week starting September 17, 2012, to discuss the closing of the Aquarius Underwater Laboratory.

In May 2013, the Science Laureates of the United States Act of 2013 (H.R. 1891; 113th Congress) was introduced into Congress. Earle was listed by one commentator as a possible nominee for the position of Science Laureate, if the act were to pass.

In January 2018, the Seattle Aquarium granted its inaugural Lifetime Achievement Award to Earle and renamed the Seattle Aquarium Medal in her honor. The Aquarium's first Lifetime Achievement Award was awarded to Earle.

Alongside her work at Mission Blue, she also serves on several boards, including the Marine Conservation Institute.

With TED's support, she launched Mission Blue, which aims to establish marine protected areas (dubbed "Hope Spots") around the globe. Mission Blue's vision is to achieve 30% protection of the ocean by 2030, and more than two hundred organisations have supported them in this mission to date (2019). These supporters range from large, global companies to small, bespoke research teams.

With Mission Blue and its partners, Earle leads expeditions to Hope Spots around the globe. The organization has continued to grow with Earle's work and the help of her team. As of 2020, Mission Blue has created 122 Hope Spots around the world. Past expeditions include Cuba in 2009, Belize in January 2010, the Galápagos Islands in April 2010, Costa Rica and the Central American Dome in early 2014 and the South African Coast in late 2014. A series of geographic information Story Maps are available through ESRI's ArcGIS which illustrate examples of Mission Blue hope spots around the world in great detail including: 1 Tribugá Gulf Hope Spot, 2 Little Cayman Hope Spot, and 3 Galápagos National Park Expedition. In August 2014, a Netflix exclusive documentary titled 'Mission Blue' was released. It focuses on Earle's life and career as her Mission Blue campaign to create a global network of marine protected areas.

In 2016, Earle appeared in the featurette Plankton Rules the World!, which coincided with The SpongeBob Movie: Sponge Out of Water. The featurette was shown at the Arlington Theater in Santa Barbara.

In the 2019 article "California Seamounts Are Sylvia Earle's Newest 'Hope Spots'" featured in Hakai Magazine, Hope Spots are described as "areas critical to the health of the ocean for any number of reasons: an abundance or diversity of species, a unique habitat or ecosystem, or significant cultural or economic value to a community". Seamounts are also described as destinations for mining companies searching for undersea precious metals.

The Sylvia Earle in a Greenland fjord, September 2026.

In January 2020, Aurora Expeditions announced their second ship would be named The Sylvia Earle after the marine biologist.

Earle is one of the supporters of the 30X30 movement which aims to protect 30% of seawaters by 2030 and which would be a significant increase from only 6% (as of 2021).

She supports the introduction of the crime of ecocide to the International Criminal Court, stating, "There is a real case to be made for recognising ecocide in the International Criminal Court right along with genocide. Our existence is on the line".

In June 2024, DENR Secretary Toni Yulo-Loyzaga convened a dialogue with Earle, Ambassador MaryKay Carlson and Senator Loren Legarda, inter alia, to advocate Philippine Marine Biodiversity Protection and Conservation. Earle, as token gifted Loyzaga with copy of her Ocean: A Global Odyssey. She dived in Verde Island Passage with DENR divers and marine scientists campaigning for its conservation as marine protected area. Her Mission Blue named the VIP as a "Hope Spot" in July 2023.

In June 2024, Earle was also announced as a member of the Advisory Board of Climate Cardinals, one of the world's largest youth-led climate organizations.

One of the main protagonists in the novel Playground is a marine biologist who is loosely based on Earle.

== Accomplishments and honors ==
- 1970: U.S. Department of Interior Conservation Service Award and Los Angeles Times Woman of the Year
- 1976: NOGI Award for Science
- 1980: Explorers Club Lowell Thomas Award
- 1981: Ordained as a Knight of the Order of the Golden Ark by the Prince of the Netherlands
- 1986: Set the women's record for a world solo dive depth and tie the overall record with Graham Hawkes
- 1990: Society of Woman Geographers gold medal
- 1991: American Academy of Achievement Golden Plate Award
- 1996: Lindbergh Foundation award, the Explorers Club Medal and Zonta International Honorary Member
- 1997: SeaKeeper Award at The International SeaKeepers Society's Bal de la Mer
- 1998: UN Global 500 Laureate and National Wildlife Federation Conservationist of the Year
- 2000: National Women's Hall of Fame, Library of Congress Living Legend, Women Divers Hall of Fame
- 2001: Robin W. Winks Award For Enhancing Public Understanding of National Parks
- 2004: International Banksia Award, the Richard Hopper Day Memorial Medal from the Philadelphia Academy of Sciences, and the Barnard College medal
- 2005: John P. McGovern Science and Society Award from Sigma Xi
- 2009: Artiglio Award (Premio Artiglio 2009) and TED Prize
- 2009: The National Audubon Society's prestigious Rachel Carson Award, a premier award honoring distinguished American women environmentalists.
- 2010: The Roy Chapman Andrews Distinguished Explorer Award from the Roy Chapman Andrews Society in Beloit, WI.
- 2010: Carl Sagan Award for Public Understanding of Science
- 2011: Honorary doctorate from Smith College and commencement address at Warren Wilson College, Medal of Honor from the Dominican Republic
- 2013: Honorary doctorate from the Nelson Mandela Metropolitan University and the Hubbard Medal, the National Geographic Society's highest honor, "for distinction in exploration, discovery and research"
- 2014: Walter Cronkite Award, UN Lifetime Achievement Award (Champions of the Earth), Glamour Woman of the Year, and the first woman to be celebrated at an Explorers Club Tribute Ceremony
- 2017: Rachel Carson Prize, Lewis Thomas Prize.
- 2017: The Perfect World Foundation Award The Conservationist of the year 2017 & the Prize "The Fragile Rhino"
- 2017: Isaac Asimov Science Award from the American Humanist Association
- 2018: Seattle Aquarium Lifetime Achievement Award
- 2018: Princess of Asturias Award of Concord (Concordia)
- 2018: Doctor of Science from the University of Edinburgh
- 2020: Aurora Expeditions announced their expedition ship would be named the Sylvia Earle.
- 2023: Stibitz-Wilson Award from the American Computer & Robotics Museum
- 2026: Legacy Shiftmaker Award at Harvard Art Museums

== Publications ==
Earle has authored more than 150 publications.

- Earle, Sylvia & Al Giddings (1980). Exploring the Deep Frontier: The Adventure of Man in the Sea. National Geographic Society. ISBN 0-87044-343-7.
- Earle, Sylvia (1996). Sea Change: A Message of the Oceans. Ballantine Books. ISBN 0-449-91065-2.
- Earle, Sylvia (1999). Dive!: My Adventure in the Deep Frontier. National Geographic Children's Books. ISBN 0-7922-7144-0.
- Earle, Sylvia (1999). Wild Ocean: America's Parks Under the Sea. National Geographic Society. ISBN 0-7922-7471-7.
- Earle, Sylvia (2000). Sea Critters. National Geographic Children's Books. ISBN 0-439-28575-5.
- Ellen, Prager & Earle, Sylvia (2000). The Oceans. McGraw-Hill. ISBN 0-07-138177-5.
- Earle, Sylvia (2001). Hello, Fish!: Visiting the Coral Reef. National Geographic Children's Books. ISBN 0-7922-6697-8.
- Earle, Sylvia (2001). National Geographic Atlas of the Ocean: The Deep Frontier. National Geographic. ISBN 0-7922-6426-6.
- Earle, Sylvia (2003). Jump into Science: Coral Reefs. National Geographic Children's Books. ISBN 0-7922-6953-5.
- Earle, Sylvia & Linda K. Glover (2008). Ocean: An Illustrated Atlas (National Geographic Atlas). National Geographic. ISBN 978-1-4262-0319-0.
- Earle, Sylvia (2009). The World Is Blue: How Our Fate and the Ocean's Are One. National Geographic Books. ISBN 978-1-4262-0541-5.
- Co-author (2011). The Protection and Management of the Sargasso Sea: The golden floating rainforest of the Atlantic Ocean. Summary Science and Supporting Evidence Case. Sargasso Sea Alliance.
- Earle, Sylvia (2012). The Sweet Spot in Time. Why the Ocean Matters to Everyone, Everywhere. Virginia Quarterly Review, Fall.
- Earle, Sylvia (2014). Blue Hope: Exploring and Caring for Earth's Magnificent Ocean. National Geographic. ISBN 9781426213953.
