= Frederik Paulsen Jr =

Swedish businessman

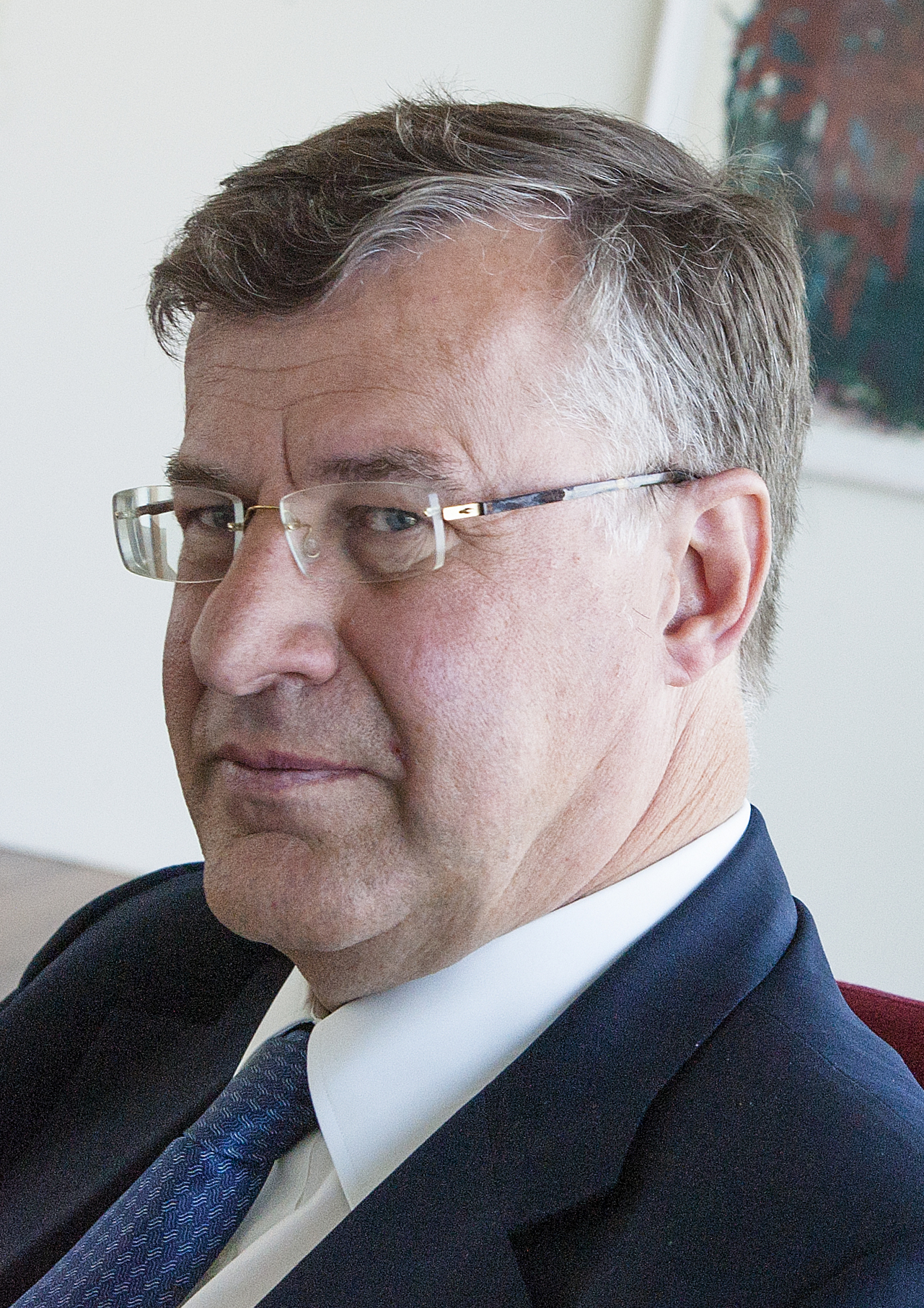
- Born: Frederik Paulsen Jr; October 30, 1950 (age 75); Stockholm, Sweden
- Education: Christian Albrechts University, Kiel, Germany; Lund University, Sweden; EHESS, Paris, France
- Known for: Ferring Pharmaceuticals
- Parent(s): Frederik Paulsen Sr; Margareta Liljequist

Frederik Paulsen OBE is a Swedish billionaire businessman and non-executive chairman of Ferring Pharmaceuticals.

== Biography ==
=== Early life ===
Frederik Dag Arfst Paulsen was born on 30 October 1950 in Stockholm, Sweden, as a Swedish citizen. His father was Frederik Paulsen Sr, the founder of Ferring Pharmaceuticals. Paulsen grew up in Sweden, with his father and his father's second wife, Dr. Eva Wolf Frandsen – one of the founding researchers at Ferring. He attended school in Sweden and then went on to study chemistry at the Christian Albrecht University in Kiel, (Germany) and business administration at Lund University in Sweden. He received his doctoral degree in Demography from Ecole des Hautes Etudes en Sciences Sociales in Paris, France.

=== Career ===
Since 2003, Paulsen has been based in Switzerland, where Ferring subsequently established its global headquarters in Saint-Prex. His business interests focus mainly on the Ferring Pharmaceuticals Group where he has worked since 1976 in senior executive positions.

In addition, he has interests in real estate and viticulture. Frederik Paulsen also holds several board memberships. Until 2023, he was for instance a member of the board of directors of the tobacco company Philip Morris International.

Since 2009 until 2022, Paulsen also held the position of Honorary Consul of the Russian Federation, in Lausanne, Switzerland. He was appointed Honorary Consul General in 2015. In 2020, he was appointed a Knight of the Order of St. John by Queen Elizabeth II.

=== Personal life ===
==== Exploration ====
Paulsen is also an explorer. In 2007, alongside Russian Veteran explorer Artur Chilingarov and Australian researcher Mike McDowell, he descended more than 14,000 feet in a Russian MIR submersible to take samples of soil and fauna at the bottom of the Arctic Ocean at the North Pole. In 2010, Paulsen, alongside his travelling companion François Bernard, completed the first crossing of the Bering Strait from America to Russia in an ultralight aircraft.

In the winter of 2013, he became the first man to explore all eight of the Earth's poles.

==== Philanthropy ====
As chairman emeritus of Ferring, Paulsen is a founding sponsor of The Peptide Therapeutics Foundation. He has contributed to the opening of several fertility clinics throughout Russia to help solve its demographics problem. He has donated approximately $40 million to the Museum Kunst der Westküste (Museum of West Coast Art). He has also substantially contributed to the Salk Institute in San Diego, California, Bhutan's Royal Textile Academy and the South Georgia Heritage Trust in Scotland.

== Honours and awards ==
- Doctorate honoris causa, Politics, Moscow State Institute of International Relations, Moscow, Russian Federation.
- Doctorate honoris causa, Duncan of Jordanstone College, University of Dundee, Scotland, United Kingdom.
- Ehrenbürgerschaft, Honorary Citizenship, awarded by the Christian Albrecht University, Kiel, Germany.
- Орден Дружбы, Order of Friendship presented by President Vladimir Putin of the Russian Federation.
- Нагрудный знак "Почетному полярнику", Honorary Polar Explorer Medal, Aspol, Moscow, Russian Federation.
- མངའ་བདག་དཔལ་གྱི་འཁོར་ལོ། Nga Dap Pel Gi Khorlo, The Order of the Druk Gyalpo, presented by King Jigme Khesar Namgyel Wangchuck of Bhutan.
- Silver Medal of Russian Geographic Society, awarded by the RGS, Russian Federation.
- Medal of Honour, granted by the Granada Dance and Music International Festival, Spain.
- Knight of the Order of St John by Queen Elizabeth II.
- The winner of the national award "Crystal Compass". (Russia)
