= Föhr-Land =

- Former Amt
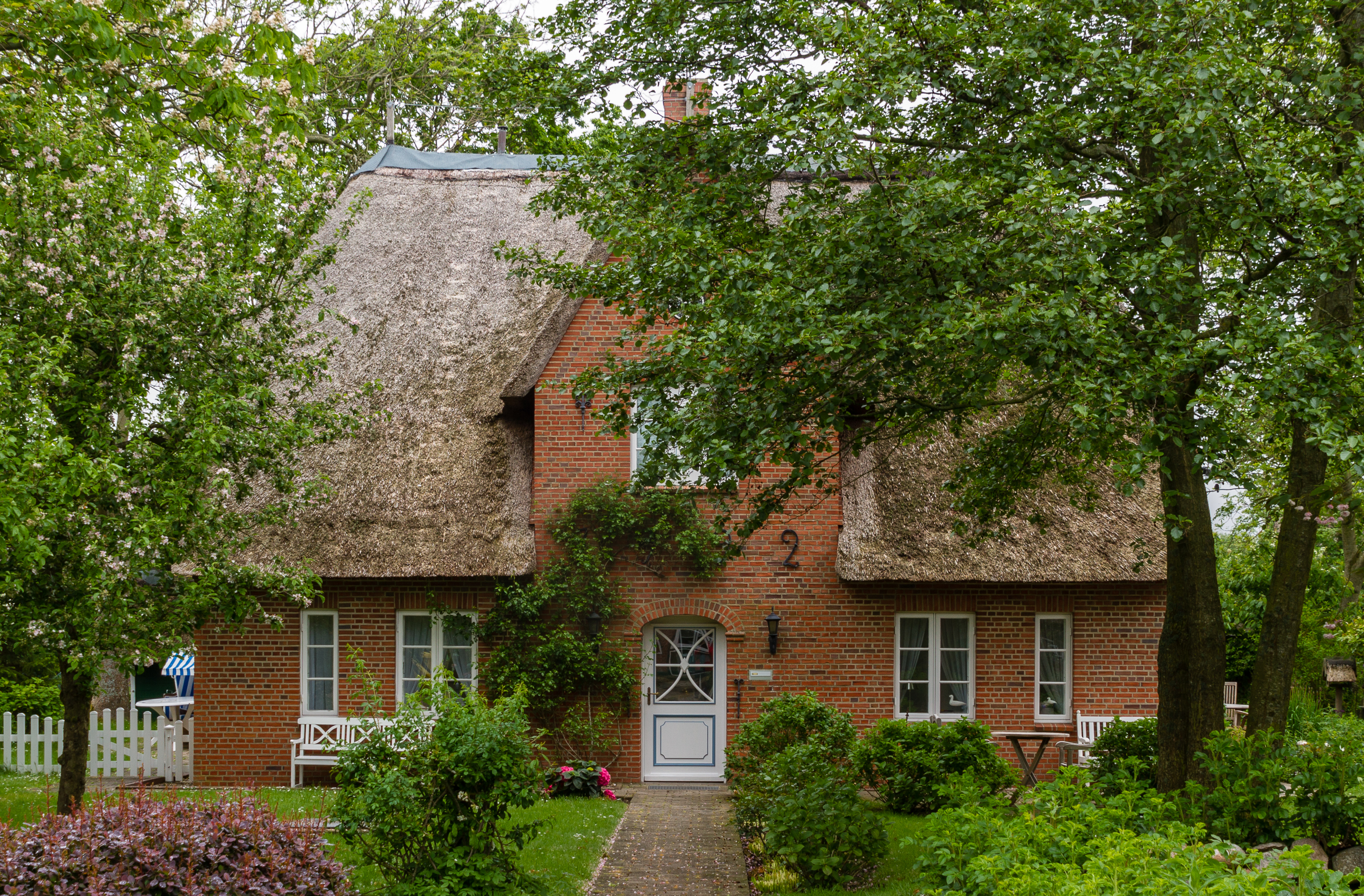
- A house in Süderende, a former municipality of Föhr-Land

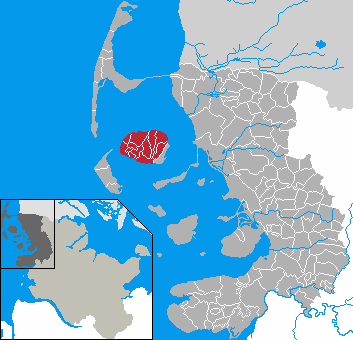
- Map of Nordfriesland highlighting Föhr-Land
- Country: Germany
- State: Schleswig-Holstein
- District: Nordfriesland
- Disestablished: 1 January 2007
- Region seat: Wyk auf Föhr

Area
  - Total: 75 km^{2} (29 sq mi)

Föhr-Land was an Amt ("collective municipality") in the district of Nordfriesland, in Schleswig-Holstein, Germany. It covered the island of Föhr (except the independent town Wyk auf Föhr), in the North Sea, approx. 45 km northwest of Husum. Its seat was in Midlum until August 1, 2006, since then it was in the town hall of Wyk auf Föhr.

In January 2007, the Amt Föhr-Land has been merged with the previously independent town Wyk auf Föhr and the Amt Amrum, to form the Amt Föhr-Amrum.

Until January 1, 2007, the Amt Föhr-Land consisted of the following municipalities (population in 2005 between brackets):

- Alkersum (416)
- Borgsum (343)
- Dunsum (79)
- Midlum (362)
- Nieblum (636)
- Oevenum (494)
- Oldsum (564)
- Süderende (185)
- Utersum (412)
- Witsum (46)
- Wrixum (689)
