= Oevenum =

Oevenum Ööwenem / Øvenum
- Municipality
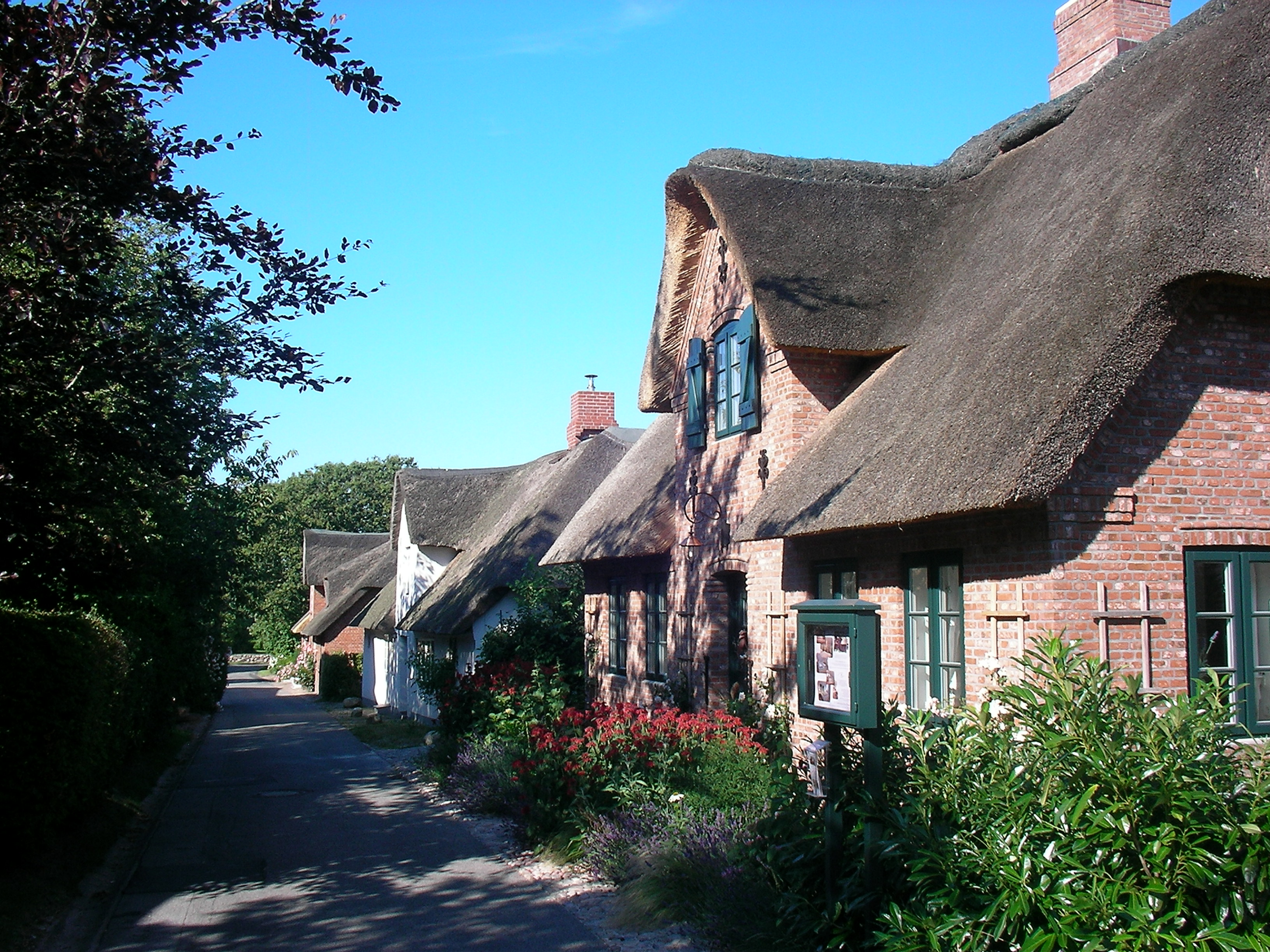
- A street in Oevenum

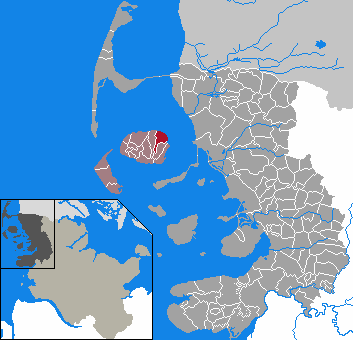
- Location of Oevenum; Ööwenem / Øvenum within Nordfriesland district
- Interactive map of Oevenum; Ööwenem / Øvenum
- Location within Germany Location within Schleswig-Holstein
- Coordinates: 54°43′N 8°31′E
- Country: Germany
- State: Schleswig-Holstein
- District: Nordfriesland
- Municipal assoc.: Föhr-Amrum

Government
  - Mayor: Gisela Riemann

Area
  - Total: 10.87 km^{2} (4.20 sq mi)
- Elevation: 2 m (6.6 ft)

Population (2025-12-31)
  - Total: 450
  - Density: 41/km^{2} (110/sq mi)
- Time zone: UTC+01:00 (CET)
  - Summer (DST): UTC+02:00 (CEST)
- Postal codes: 25938
- Dialling codes: 04681
- Vehicle registration: NF
- Website: www.oevenum.de

Oevenum (Fering: Ööwenem, Danish: Øvenum) is a municipality on the island of Föhr, in the district of Nordfriesland, in Schleswig-Holstein, Germany.

== History ==
In 1796 23 houses in the neighbouring village of Nieblum were destroyed by a fire. Subsequently, a bell was installed atop Oevenum's school house to warn the people in case of fire. The bell was moreover rung in the morning and at noon and was also used as a means of alarm during storm surges. In 1882 Germany's first junior firefighters were recruited in Oevenum. Thus Oevenum's Junior Fire Service is presumably also the oldest of its kind in Europe.

At the end of the Franco-Prussian War in 1871 an oak tree was planted in Oevenum to celebrate the subsequent peace.

== Homeland museum ==
In a former barn, a homeland museum has been established which documents life in general and the agricultural development on Föhr. You will also find information on navigating, the construction of sea dikes and on the sea surrounding Föhr.

== Politics ==
Since the communal elections of 2008, the Oevenumuer Wählergemeinschaft holds eight seats out of nine in the municipality council. A single candidate holds the other seat.

== Economy ==
Tourism is an important source of income for Oevenum.
