= Midlum =

Midlum may refer to the following:

== Places ==
- Midlum, Schleswig-Holstein, Germany
- Midlum, Lower Saxony, Germany
- Midlum, Netherlands

== Other uses ==
- Renault Midlum, a truck
