= Wrixum =

Wrixum Wraksem / Vriksum
- Municipality
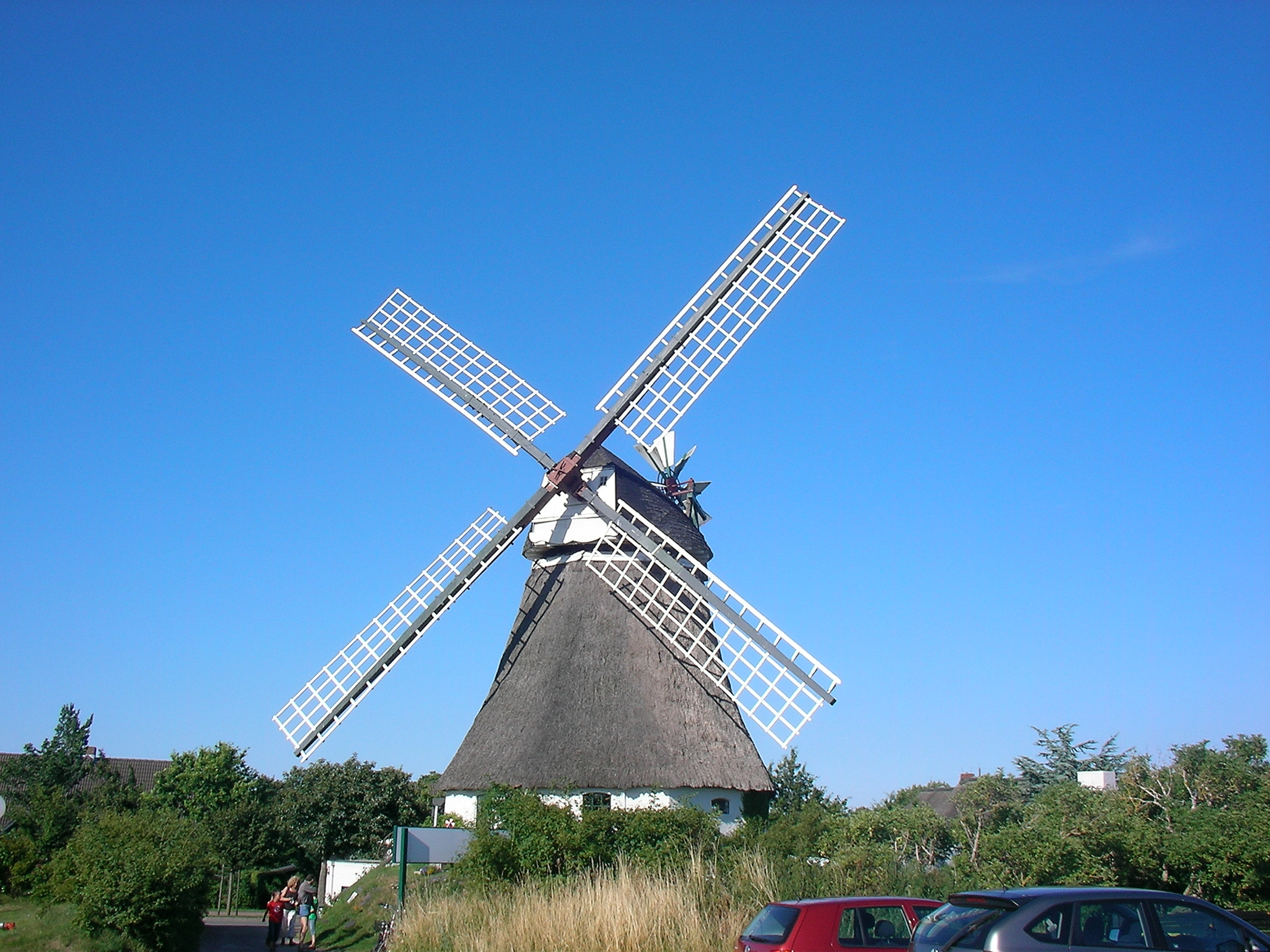
- The windmill in Wrixum

- Coat of arms

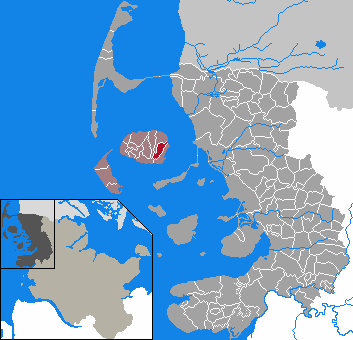
- Location of Wrixum; Wraksem / Vriksum within Nordfriesland district
- Interactive map of Wrixum; Wraksem / Vriksum
- Location within Germany Location within Schleswig-Holstein
- Coordinates: 54°43′N 8°32′E
- Country: Germany
- State: Schleswig-Holstein
- District: Nordfriesland
- Municipal assoc.: Föhr-Amrum

Government
  - Mayor: Heidi Braun

Area
  - Total: 7.55 km^{2} (2.92 sq mi)
- Elevation: 0 m (0 ft)

Population (2025-12-31)
  - Total: 583
  - Density: 77.2/km^{2} (200/sq mi)
- Time zone: UTC+01:00 (CET)
  - Summer (DST): UTC+02:00 (CEST)
- Postal codes: 25938
- Dialling codes: 04681
- Vehicle registration: NF
- Website: www.wrixum.de

Wrixum (German pronunciation: [ˈvʁɪksʊm]; Fering: Wraksem, Danish: Vriksum) is a municipality on the island of Föhr, in the district of Nordfriesland, in Schleswig-Holstein, Germany.

== Geography and traffic ==
Wrixum is one of eleven municipalities on Föhr and it is situated directly at the town limits of Wyk auf Föhr. The place enjoys a good bus service and features several bicycle rentals.

== Politics ==
The WWG holds all nine seats of the municipal council since the elections of 2008.

=== Arms ===
Blazon: Or. In a hill vert over a wavy base argent, therein waves azure, a wind mill argent. In chief two oystercatchers proper, facing.

=== Town twinning ===
Wrixum has been twinned with Aub in Lower Franconia since 1998.

== Economy ==
There are many small enterprises in Wrixum, yet tourism remains the most important economic factor.

== Sights ==
A landmark of Wrixum is the wind mill which was erected in 1851.
