= Borgsum =

Borgsum Borigsem
- Municipality
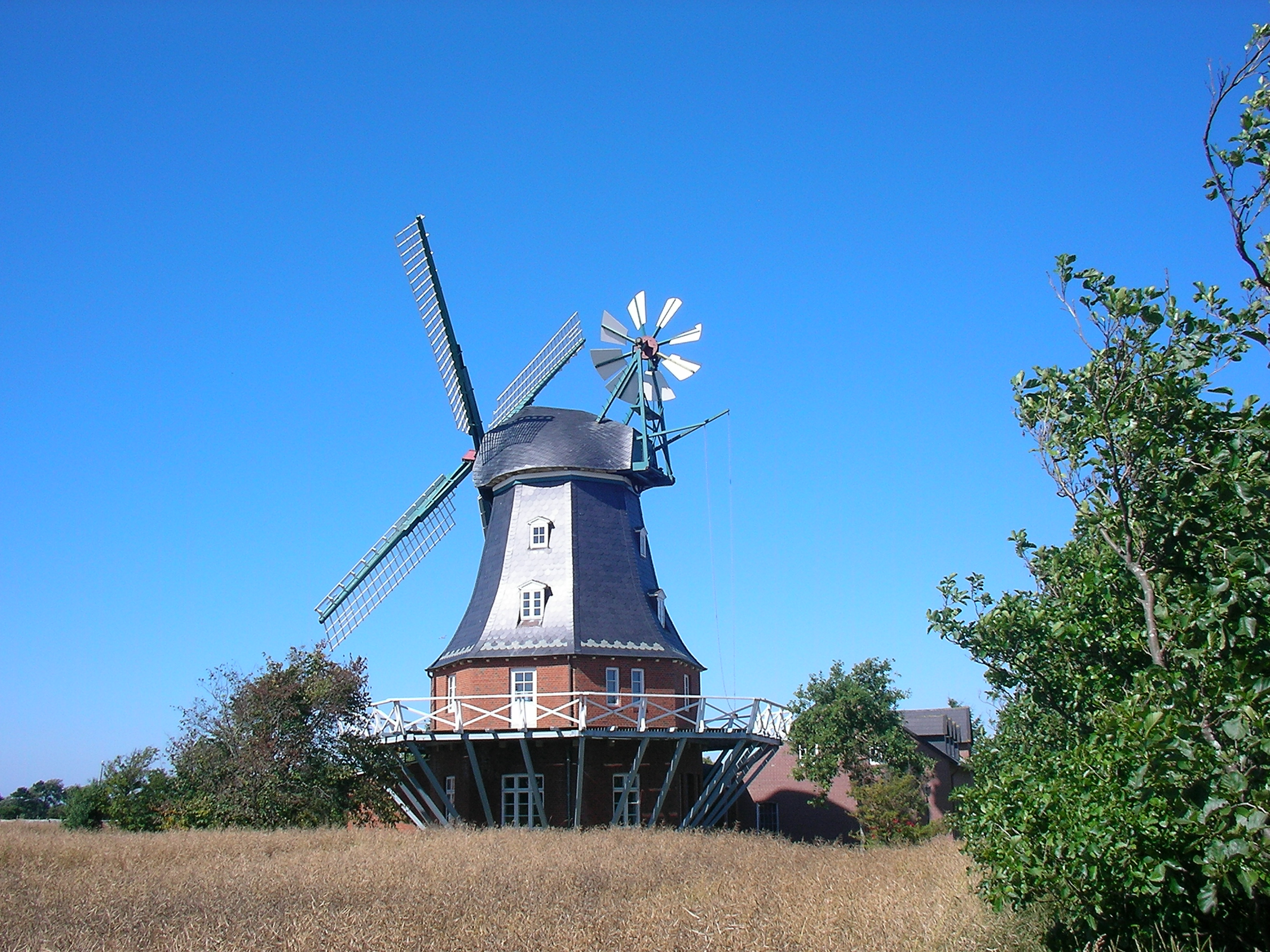
- The windmill in Borgsum

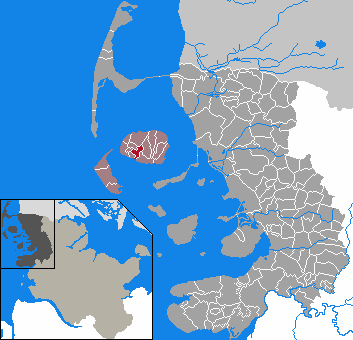
- Location of Borgsum; Borigsem within Nordfriesland district
- Interactive map of Borgsum; Borigsem
- Location within Germany Location within Schleswig-Holstein
- Coordinates: 54°42′N 8°28′E
- Country: Germany
- State: Schleswig-Holstein
- District: Nordfriesland
- Municipal assoc.: Föhr-Amrum

Government
  - Mayor: Norbert Nielsen

Area
  - Total: 5.51 km^{2} (2.13 sq mi)
- Elevation: 5 m (16 ft)

Population (2025-12-31)
  - Total: 316
  - Density: 57.4/km^{2} (149/sq mi)
- Time zone: UTC+01:00 (CET)
  - Summer (DST): UTC+02:00 (CEST)
- Postal codes: 25938
- Dialling codes: 04683
- Vehicle registration: NF
- Website: www.borgsum-auf-foehr.de

Borgsum (Fering: Borigsem) is a municipality on the island of Föhr in the district of Nordfriesland, in Schleswig-Holstein, Germany.

== History ==
Memorial

The Lembecksburg

The oldest document in which Borgsum was mentioned dates from 1460. A monument in Main Street commemorates the first documentary mention. The name means "Settlement at the castle". Today, Borgsum counts about 350 inhabitants.

== Sights ==
Frisian house in Main Street

Said castle is the Lembecksburg, in fact a medieval ring wall with a diameter of 95 meters and a height of ten meters. According to old lore, it was constructed in the 9th century as a stronghold against the Vikings and is named after the knight Klaus Lembeck who had allegedly been residing there as a steward of king Valdemar IV of Denmark in the 14th century. After breaking his feudal oath, though, Lembeck is said to have been besieged by the king's host. Ít is disputed though whether Lembeck ever set foot on the island. Archaeological findings on Sylt island in the late 1970s suggest, however, that the Lembecksburg and similar facilities on Sylt date back to the days of the Roman Empire.

In 1991 a wind mill was erected in place of an older, dilapidated mill.

Several sightworthy Frisian houses with thatched roofs can be seen in Main Street.

== Politics ==
Since the communal elections of 2008, the BWG constituents' association holds six of nine seats in the municipality council. Another seat is held by the ABB. The ninth seat is vacant, no major German parties are represented in the council.

== Economy ==
Borgsum is dominated by agriculture and tourism. Additionally, there are a few crafts businesses.
