= Dunsum =

Dunsum Dunsem
- Municipality
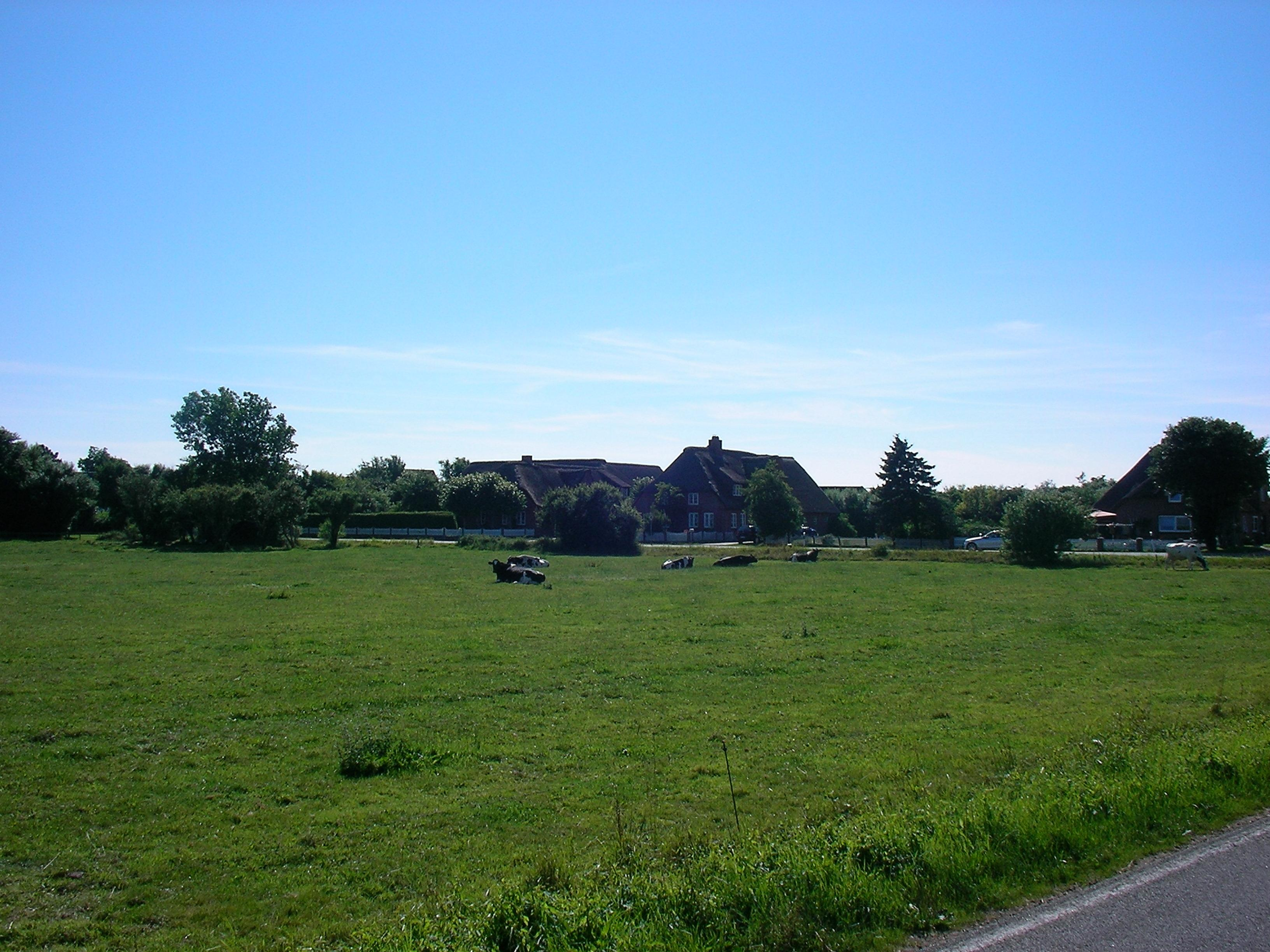

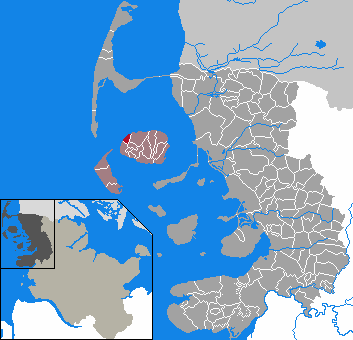
- Location of Dunsum; Dunsem within Nordfriesland district
- Interactive map of Dunsum; Dunsem
- Location within Germany Location within Schleswig-Holstein
- Coordinates: 54°43′N 08°22′E
- Country: Germany
- State: Schleswig-Holstein
- District: Nordfriesland
- Municipal assoc.: Föhr-Amrum

Government
  - Mayor: Erk Hemsen

Area
  - Total: 2.72 km^{2} (1.05 sq mi)
- Elevation: 0 m (0 ft)

Population (2025-12-31)
  - Total: 76
  - Density: 28/km^{2} (72/sq mi)
- Time zone: UTC+01:00 (CET)
  - Summer (DST): UTC+02:00 (CEST)
- Postal codes: 25938
- Dialling codes: 04683
- Vehicle registration: NF
- Website: www.dunsum.de

Dunsum (Fering: Dunsem) is a municipality located on the western shore of Föhr in the district of Nordfriesland, in Schleswig-Holstein, Germany. It is composed of the districts of Greater and Lesser Dunsum.

== Geography and traffic ==
From Dunsum, guided mudflat hikes to the neighbouring island of Amrum are offered at low tide. Amrum and Sylt can be seen from there. In the tidal flats north of the village the Baalkstian is located, a large glacial erratic, which was destroyed during a storm surge. The tale has it, that a treasure is hidden below the rock, yet it has never been found.

Bus lines connect Dunsum to the other villages of the island and to the town of Wyk auf Föhr.

== History ==
Historical population
Year	Pop.	±%
1667	114	—
1678	140	+22.8%
1689	164	+17.1%
1700	149	−9.1%
1711	161	+8.1%
1722	154	−4.3%
1787	147	−4.5%
1801	141	−4.1%
1834	107	−24.1%
1860	121	+13.1%
1880	89	−26.4%
1900	96	+7.9%
1939	69	−28.1%
1961	89	+29.0%
1982	92	+3.4%
2016	74	−19.6%

The name means "Donni's settlement".

In the 17th and 18th century, whaling was an important trade on Föhr. A census in 1787 showed that Dunsum had 147 inhabitants, 40 of whom were seafarers.

As a part of Westerland Föhr, Dunsum belonged to the Royal Enclaves of Denmark and thus was a direct part of the Danish crown while Osterland Föhr belonged to the duchy of Schleswig. Only when Denmark lost Schleswig to Prussia in the Second Schleswig War, Dunsum became a part of Schleswig-Holstein.

== Politics ==
Since the communal elections of 2008 the Dunsumer Wählergemeinschaft holds all seven seats of the municipality council.
