= Utersum =

Utersum Ödersem / Yttersum
- Municipality
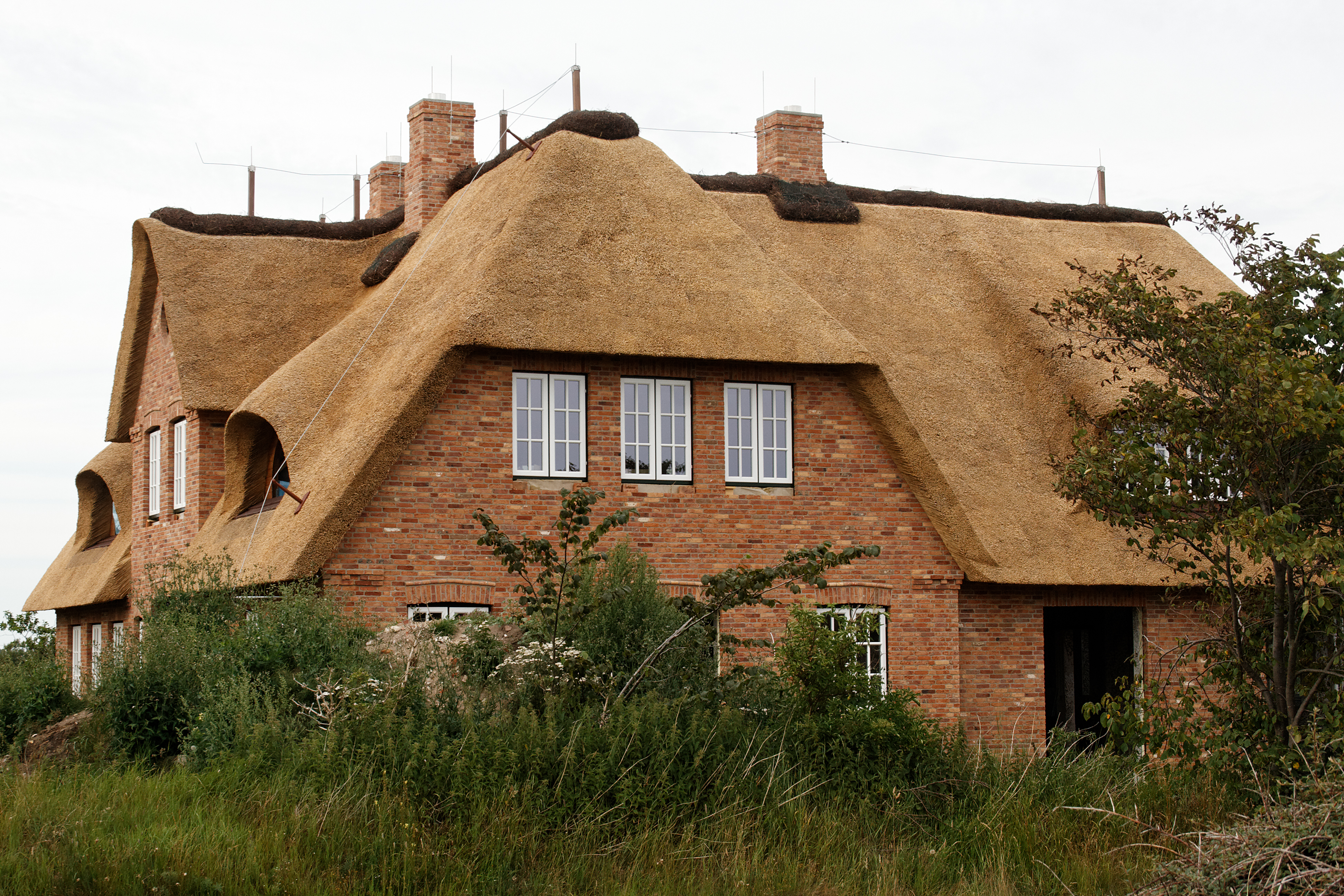
- A thatched house in Utersum

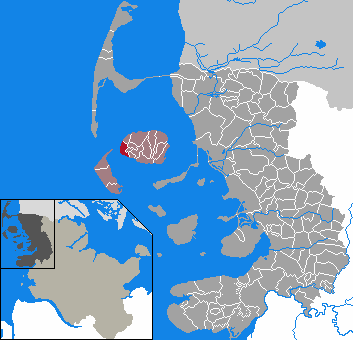
- Location of Utersum; Ödersem / Yttersum within Nordfriesland district
- Interactive map of Utersum; Ödersem / Yttersum
- Location within Germany Location within Schleswig-Holstein
- Coordinates: 54°43′N 8°24′E
- Country: Germany
- State: Schleswig-Holstein
- District: Nordfriesland
- Municipal assoc.: Föhr-Amrum

Government
  - Mayor: Göntje Schwab

Area
  - Total: 5.26 km^{2} (2.03 sq mi)
- Elevation: 3 m (9.8 ft)

Population (2025-12-31)
  - Total: 416
  - Density: 79.1/km^{2} (205/sq mi)
- Time zone: UTC+01:00 (CET)
  - Summer (DST): UTC+02:00 (CEST)
- Postal codes: 25938
- Dialling codes: 04683
- Vehicle registration: NF
- Website: www.utersum.de

Utersum (Fering North Frisian: Ödersem, Danish: Yttersum) is a municipality on the island of Föhr, in the district of Nordfriesland, in Schleswig-Holstein, Germany. The municipality includes the hamlet of Hedehusum.

== Geography ==
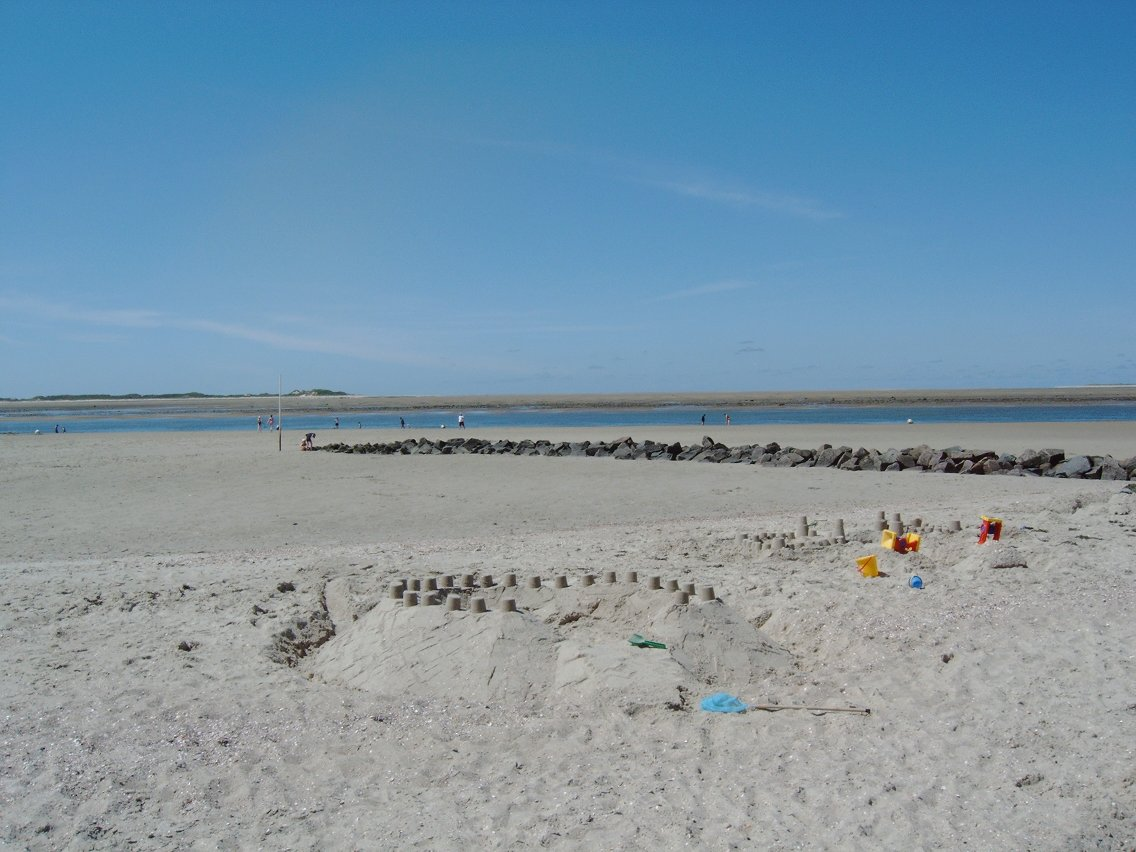
The beach at Utersum during low tide with a view at the northern headland of Amrum

The village is located between pine woods and dunes in the utmost southwest of Föhr, within the sight of the neighbouring islands of Amrum and Sylt. It is the smallest seaside resort on Föhr. In Utersum there is a sanitorium that specialises in diseases of the lung and in oncology and gynecology.

In the lowlands along the river Godel, plants like salicornia and sea aster can be found. They thrive on salt marshes whose salt content is determined by abundant floodings with sea water. Sea birds like the pied avocet use to hatch there.

A bus service links the place to the other villages on Föhr and to the town of Wyk.

== History ==
Historical population
Year	Pop.	±%
1667	239	—
1678	251	+5.0%
1689	265	+5.6%
1700	295	+11.3%
1711	320	+8.5%
1722	335	+4.7%
1787	294	−12.2%
1801	292	−0.7%
1834	205	−29.8%
1860	204	−0.5%
1880	177	−13.2%
1900	171	−3.4%
1939	255	+49.1%
1961	330	+29.4%
1982	500	+51.5%
2016	414	−17.2%

Three preserved dolmens testify of settlements from as early as the Bronze Age.

In the 17th and 18th century, whaling was an important trade on Föhr. A census in 1787 showed that Utersum and Hedehusum together had 294 inhabitants, 62 of whom were seafarers. As a part of Western Föhr, Utersum belonged to the Danish Enclaves and was thus directly linked to the Danish Kingdom while Eastern Föhr and Wyk adhered to the Duchy of Schleswig. Only when Denmark lost Schleswig to Prussia after the Second Schleswig War of 1864 did Utersum become part of Schleswig-Holstein due to the annexation of Schleswig-Holstein by Prussia in 1867.

Utersum, Hedehusum and the adjacent municipality of Witsum were the only ones in Zone II of the Schleswig Plebiscites in 1920 to vote for Denmark; as they were not directly situated at the border though, they remained with Germany.

== Politics ==
Since the municipal elections of 2008, the independent FWU holds five seats in the municipality's council, the equally independent UWG holds four.

== Notable people ==
Utersum became the favourite resort of entertainer Hans Rosenthal (1925–1987). He was made an honorary citizen of the village. Utersum was the hometown of Volkert & Boz Lorenzen and Arian Martens all able seamen lost at sea on the brig Mary Celeste in 1872.
