= Midlum, Schleswig-Holstein =

Midlum Madlem
- Municipality
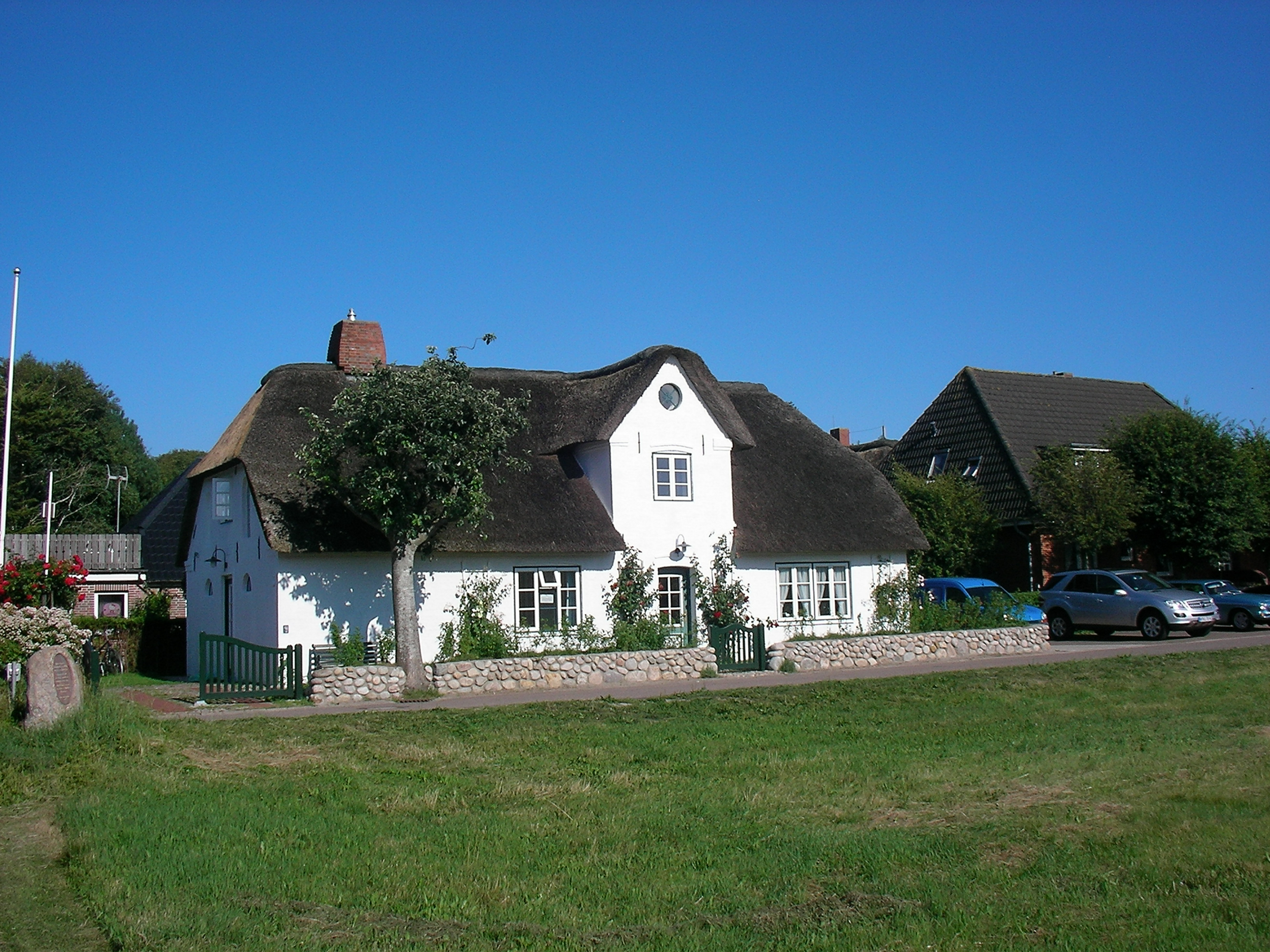
- A thatched house in Midlum

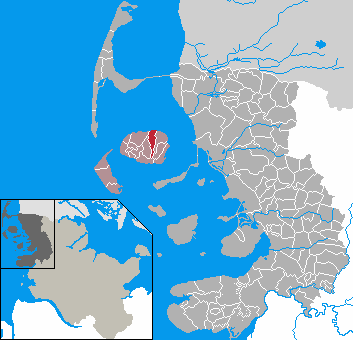
- Location of Midlum within Nordfriesland district
- Interactive map of Midlum
- Location within Germany Location within Schleswig-Holstein
- Coordinates: 54°43′N 8°31′E
- Country: Germany
- State: Schleswig-Holstein
- District: Nordfriesland
- Municipal assoc.: Föhr-Amrum

Government
  - Mayor: Stefan Hinrichsen

Area
  - Total: 8.5 km^{2} (3.3 sq mi)
- Elevation: 6 m (20 ft)

Population (2025-12-31)
  - Total: 464
  - Density: 55/km^{2} (140/sq mi)
- Time zone: UTC+01:00 (CET)
  - Summer (DST): UTC+02:00 (CEST)
- Postal codes: 25938
- Dialling codes: 04681
- Vehicle registration: NF
- Website: www.amt-foehr-amrum.de

Midlum (Fering: Madlem) is a municipality on the island of Föhr in the district of Nordfriesland, in Schleswig-Holstein, Germany.

== History ==
The name is derived from the village's being situated approximately in the middle of the island. At the same time it was located at a crossing of the two historical main roads that used to run across Föhr in a north–south direction. The name "Midlum" is first recorded in 1462.

Even today there is a tradition in Midlum to go out to the sea dike in spring and cook a meal. This habit dates back to a time when the sheep of the village were driven out there to spend the summer under a shepherd's guidance. Traditionally, children had been helping the shepherds and had therefore been rewarded with Mehlbeutel, a sort of dumplings.

== Politics ==
Until 2006, Midlum was the seat of the Amt Föhr-Land.

Of the nine seats in the municipality council, the Midlumer Wählergemeinschaft holds seven since the communal elections of 2008. It was the only faction to compete in the elections of 2008 as there are no regular political parties in Midlum's communal political landscape. Two other seats are held by single candidates.

== Economy ==
Tourism is an important income factor for the village.

== Education ==
Midlum has got the elementary school for eastern Föhr and a kindergarten called "Noah's Ark".
