= Föhr-Amrum =

- Amt
- Coat of arms

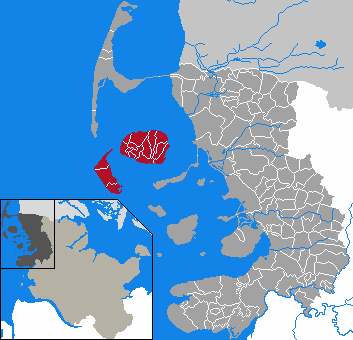
- Map of Nordfriesland highlighting Föhr-Amrum
- Interactive map of Föhr-Amrum
- Location within Germany Location within Schleswig-Holstein
- Coordinates: 54°42′N 8°34′E
- Country: Germany
- State: Schleswig-Holstein
- District: Nordfriesland
- Seat: Wyk auf Föhr
- Subdivisions: 15 municipalities

Government
  - Mayor: Heidi Braun

Area
  - Total: 103.37 km^{2} (39.91 sq mi)

Population (2025-12-31)
  - Total: 10,324
  - Density: 99.874/km^{2} (258.67/sq mi)
- Time zone: UTC+01:00 (CET)
  - Summer (DST): UTC+02:00 (CEST)
- Website: amt-foehr-amrum.de

Föhr-Amrum is an Amt ("collective municipality") in the district of Nordfriesland, a district of Schleswig-Holstein, Germany. The Amt covers the islands Föhr and Amrum. Its seat is in Wyk auf Föhr. Föhr-Amrum was created on 1 January 2007 as a merger of the two Ämter Föhr-Land and Amrum and the formerly independent town of Wyk auf Föhr.

== Subdivisions ==
Municipalities within the Amt of Föhr-Amrum

The Amt of Föhr-Amrum consists of the following municipalities:

1. Alkersum
2. Borgsum
3. Dunsum
4. Midlum
5. Nebel
6. Nieblum
7. Norddorf
8. Oevenum
9. Oldsum
10. Süderende
11. Utersum
12. Witsum
13. Wittdün
14. Wrixum
15. Wyk auf Föhr
