= Witsum =

- Municipality
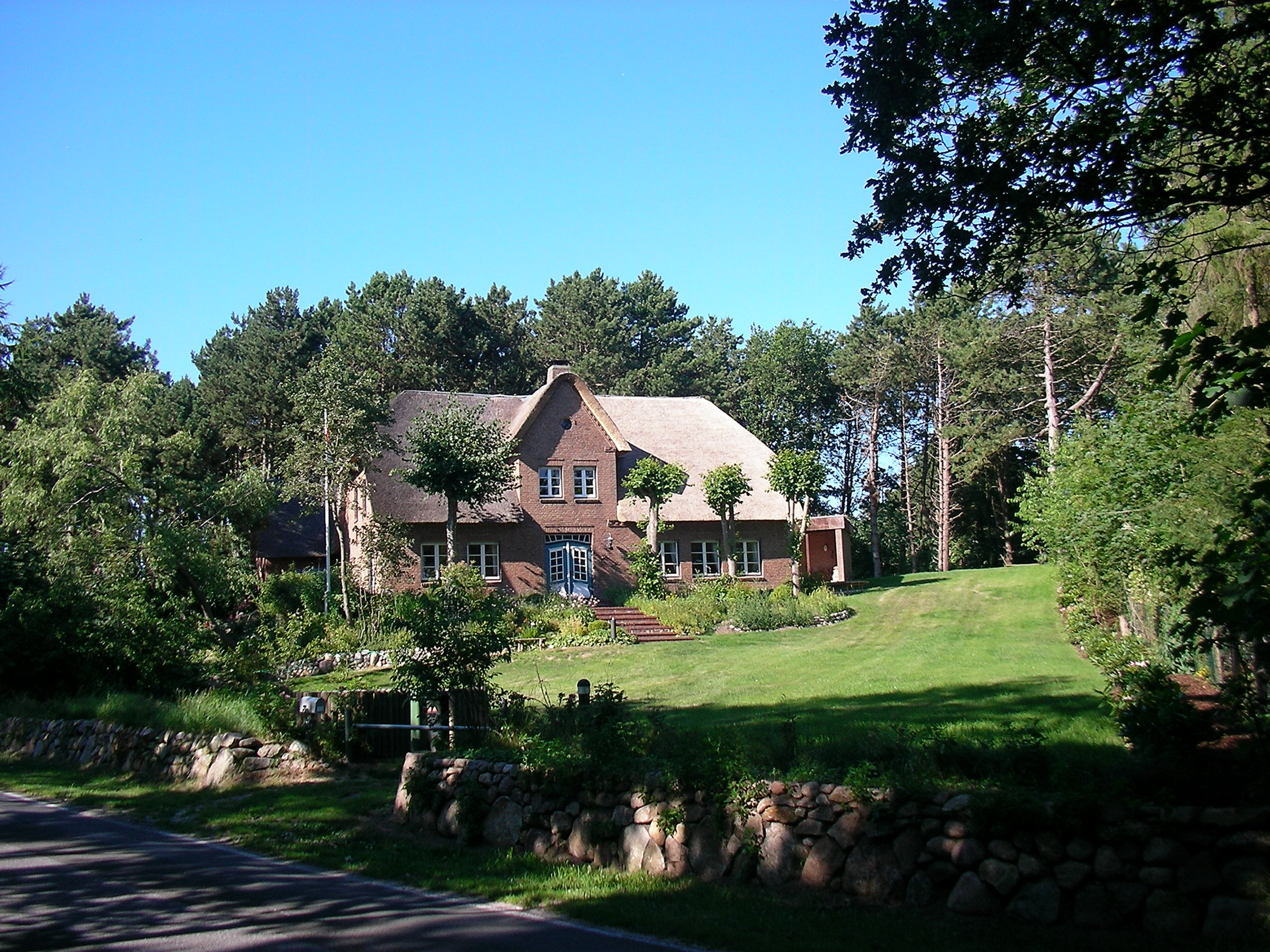

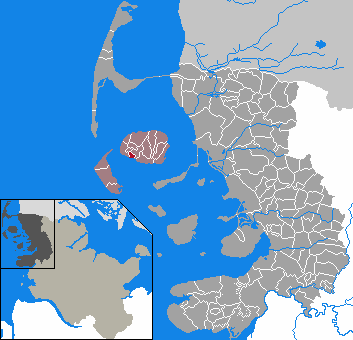
- Location of Witsum within Nordfriesland district
- Interactive map of Witsum
- Location within Germany Location within Schleswig-Holstein
- Coordinates: 54°41′11″N 8°26′7″E
- Country: Germany
- State: Schleswig-Holstein
- District: Nordfriesland
- Municipal assoc.: Föhr-Amrum

Government
  - Mayor: Cornelius Daniels

Area
  - Total: 1.59 km^{2} (0.61 sq mi)
- Elevation: 8 m (26 ft)

Population (2025-12-31)
  - Total: 43
  - Density: 27/km^{2} (70/sq mi)
- Time zone: UTC+01:00 (CET)
  - Summer (DST): UTC+02:00 (CEST)
- Postal codes: 25938
- Dialling codes: 04683
- Vehicle registration: NF
- Website: www.witsum-auf-foehr.de

Witsum (Danish: Vitsum, North Frisian: Wiisem) is a municipality on the island of Föhr, in the district of Nordfriesland, in Schleswig-Holstein, Germany.

== Geography ==
Witsum is the smallest village on Föhr. From here one can see the Halligen and Amrum. Many seabirds (migratory birds among them) use the stream Godel, the only "river" on Föhr, to hatch.

The hamlet is situated on a geestland edge; there is no sea dike.

A hill called Sylvert is located West of Witsum. There is a saying in the area that translates to: "What Mount Everest is for the world, the Sylvert is to our beloved island."

== History ==
Witsum was first recorded in 1509. As a part of Westerland Föhr, it belonged to the Royal Enclaves of Denmark and thus was a direct part of the Danish crown while Osterland Föhr belonged to the duchy of Schleswig. Only when Denmark lost Schleswig to Prussia in the Second Schleswig War, Witsum became a part of Schleswig-Holstein.

Witsum and the neighbouring village of Utersum were the only municipalities in the second zone of the Schleswig Plebiscites to vote for Denmark in 1920; yet because they were not directly situated at the border, the two of them remained with Germany.

== Politics ==
With less than 70 inhabitants, Witsum has, according to article 54 of the Schleswig-Holstein Gemeindeordnung, a town meeting instead of a council. All elective inhabitants may attend the meeting.

== Traffic ==
The State Road that connects Wyk auf Föhr with Utersum runs through Witsum. Moreover, a regular bus line serves the village.

== Economy ==
Tourism is the major source of income for Witsum.

== Gallery ==
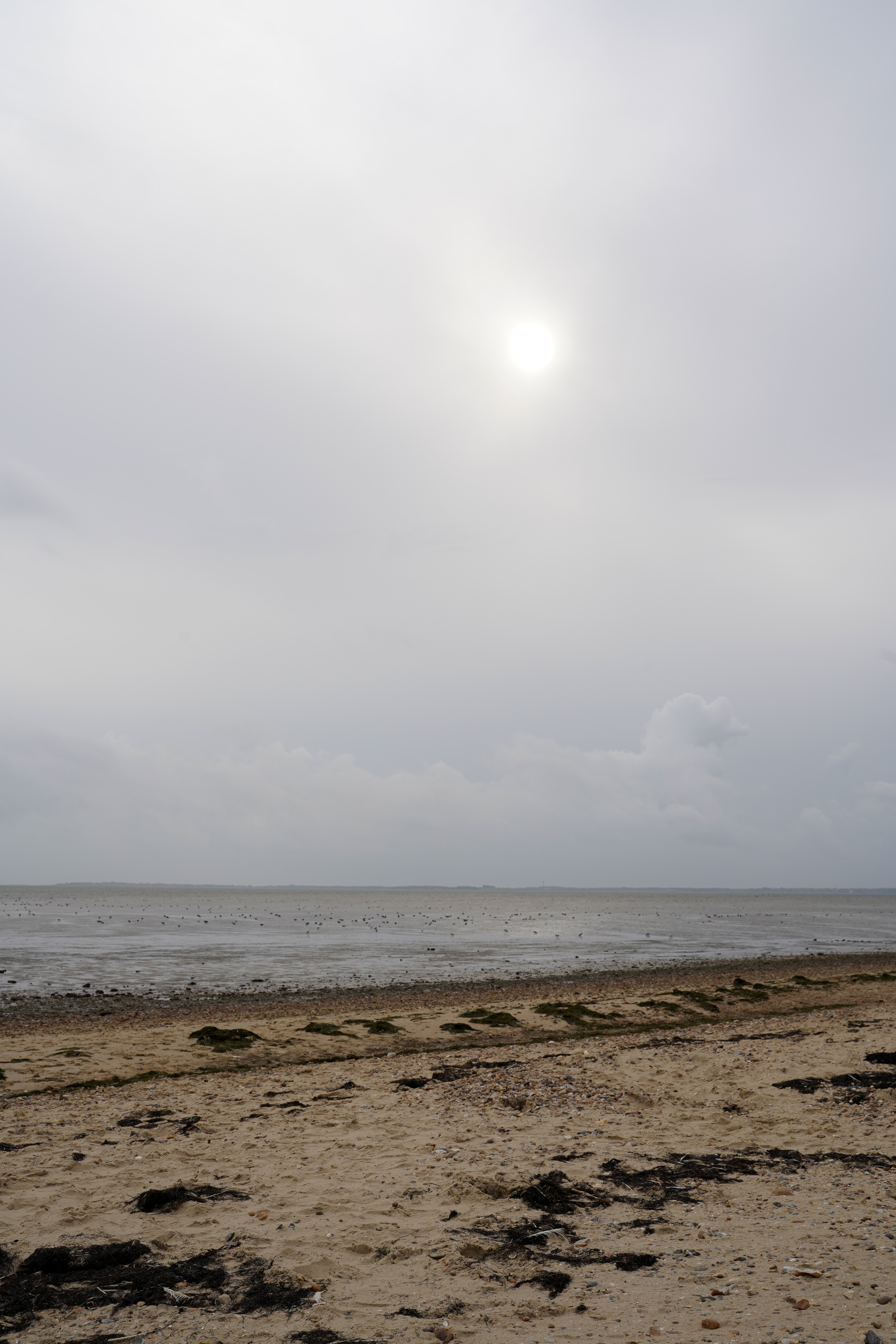
Witsum beach with neighbouring island Amrum at the horizon

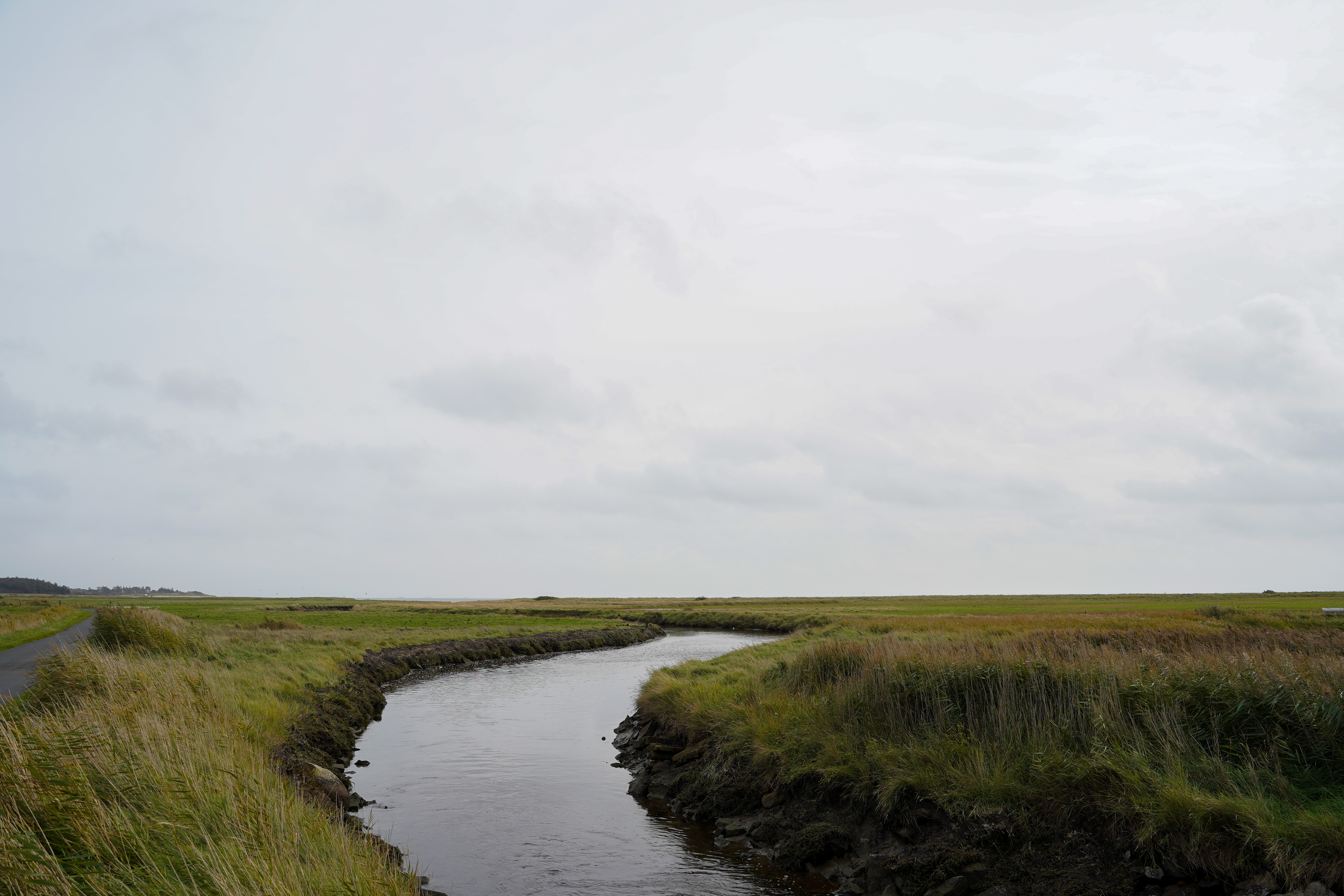
River Godel near Witsum (viewing direction south-east)

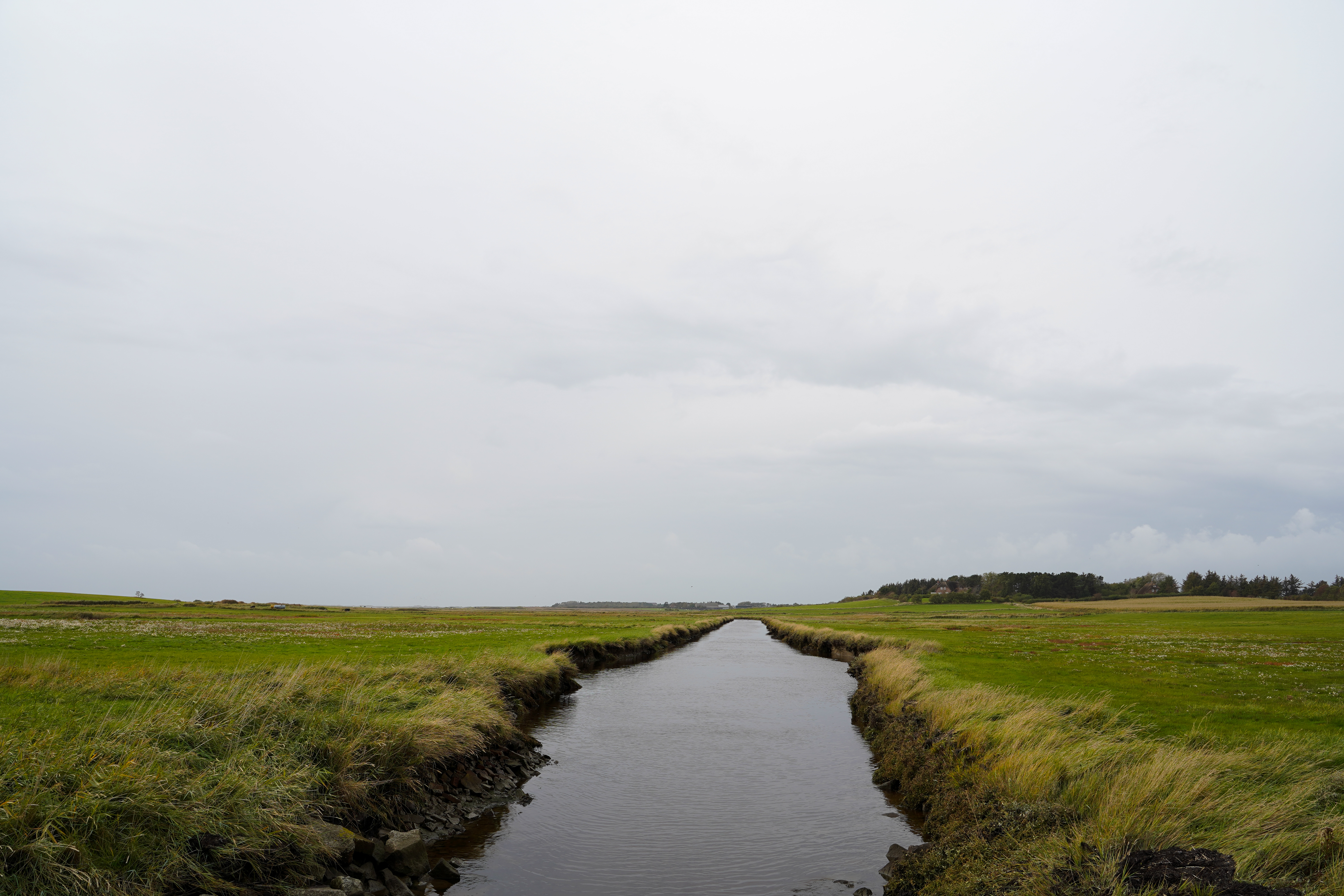
River Godel near Witsum (viewing direction north-west)
