= Nieblum =

Nieblum Njiblem
- Municipality
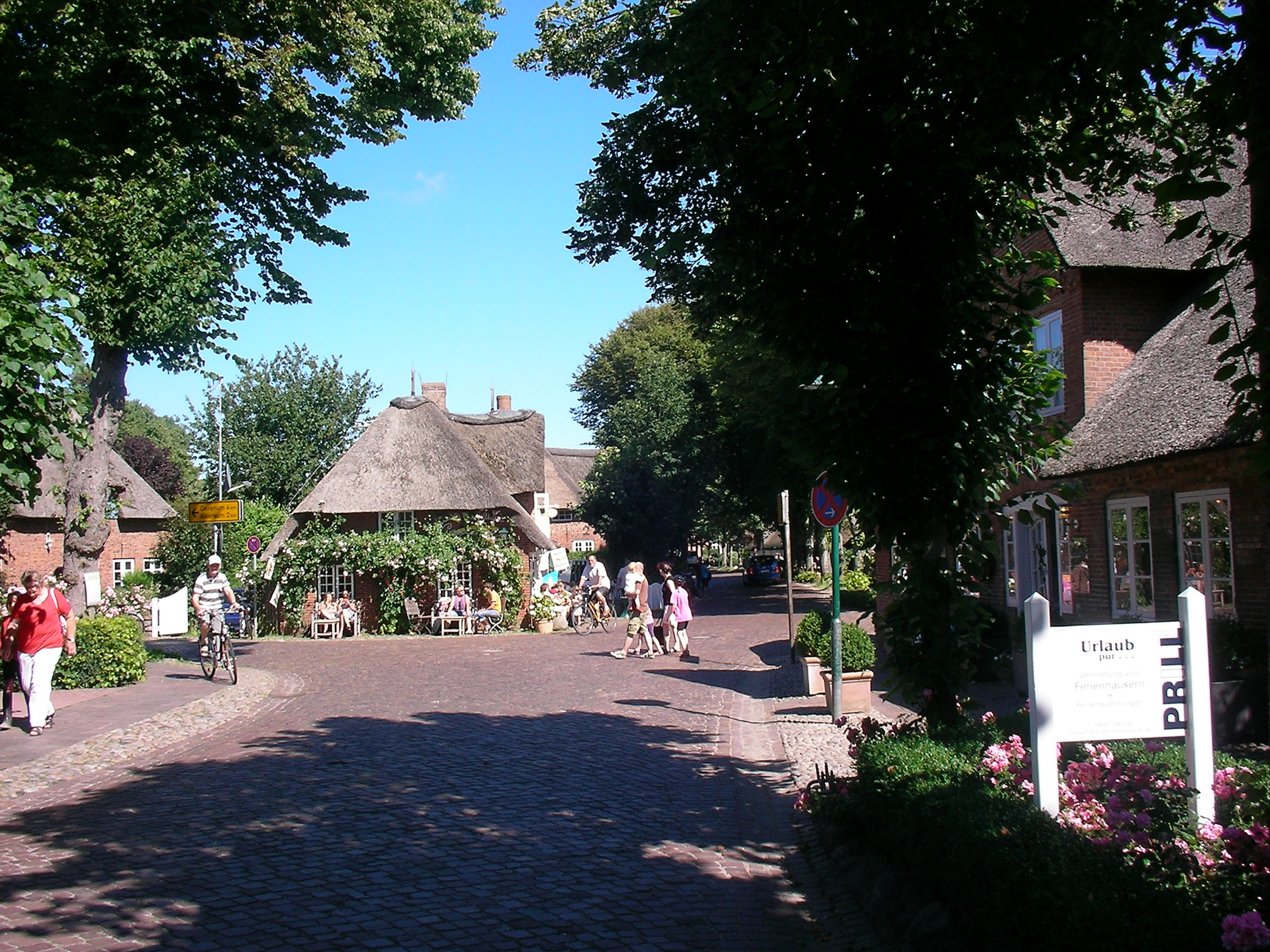

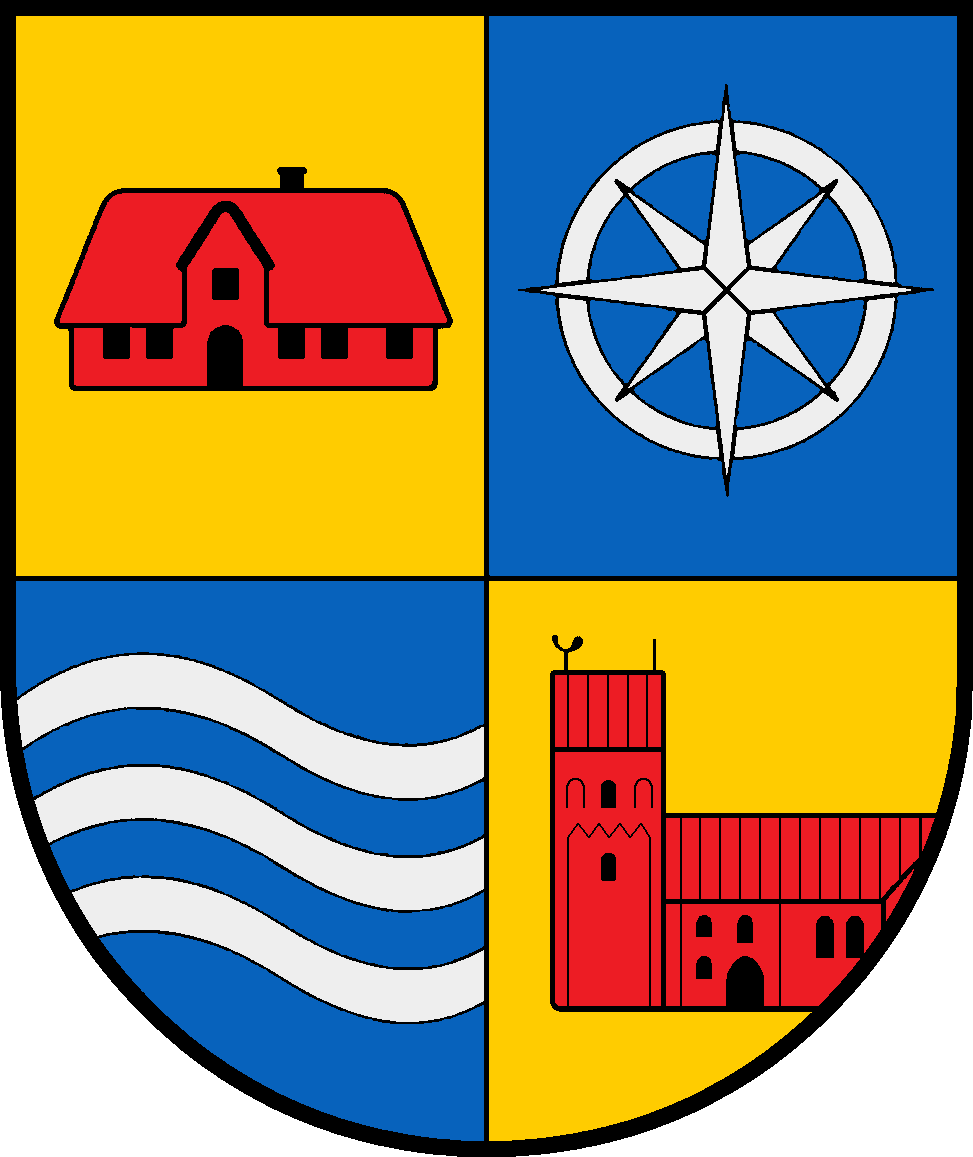
- Coat of arms

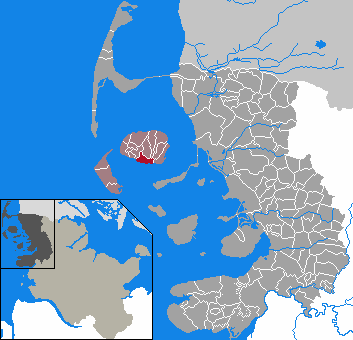
- Location of Nieblum; Njiblem within Nordfriesland district
- Interactive map of Nieblum; Njiblem
- Location within Germany Location within Schleswig-Holstein
- Coordinates: 54°42′N 8°29′E
- Country: Germany
- State: Schleswig-Holstein
- District: Nordfriesland
- Municipal assoc.: Föhr-Amrum

Government
  - Mayor: Friedrich Riewerts

Area
  - Total: 7.86 km^{2} (3.03 sq mi)
- Elevation: 4 m (13 ft)

Population (2025-12-31)
  - Total: 553
  - Density: 70.4/km^{2} (182/sq mi)
- Time zone: UTC+01:00 (CET)
  - Summer (DST): UTC+02:00 (CEST)
- Postal codes: 25938
- Dialling codes: 04681
- Vehicle registration: NF
- Website: www.nieblum-online.de

Nieblum (Fering: Njiblem, Danish: Niblum) is a municipality on the island of Föhr, in the district of Nordfriesland, in Schleswig-Holstein, Germany.

== Geography ==
Nieblum is located on the southern shore of Föhr, approximately halfways between the eastern and western edges of the island. Next to the village of Nieblum proper, the municipality includes the once independent hamlet of Goting which is situated just west of Nieblum. In Goting there is a cliffside of several meters height.

== History ==
Many of the old Frisian houses used to belong to sea captains who had made a fortune as whalers on Dutch ships. It was a hard and dangerous work which claimed a lot of lives. The tombstones in the graveyard of St. John's church, the so-called "Frisian Cathedral", in the village testify this. The church was built in the 13th century and it is the largest of the three churches on Föhr.

== Politics ==
Since the communal elections of 2018, the Nieblumer Wählergemeinschaft holds all nine seats in the municipality council.

== Culture and sights ==
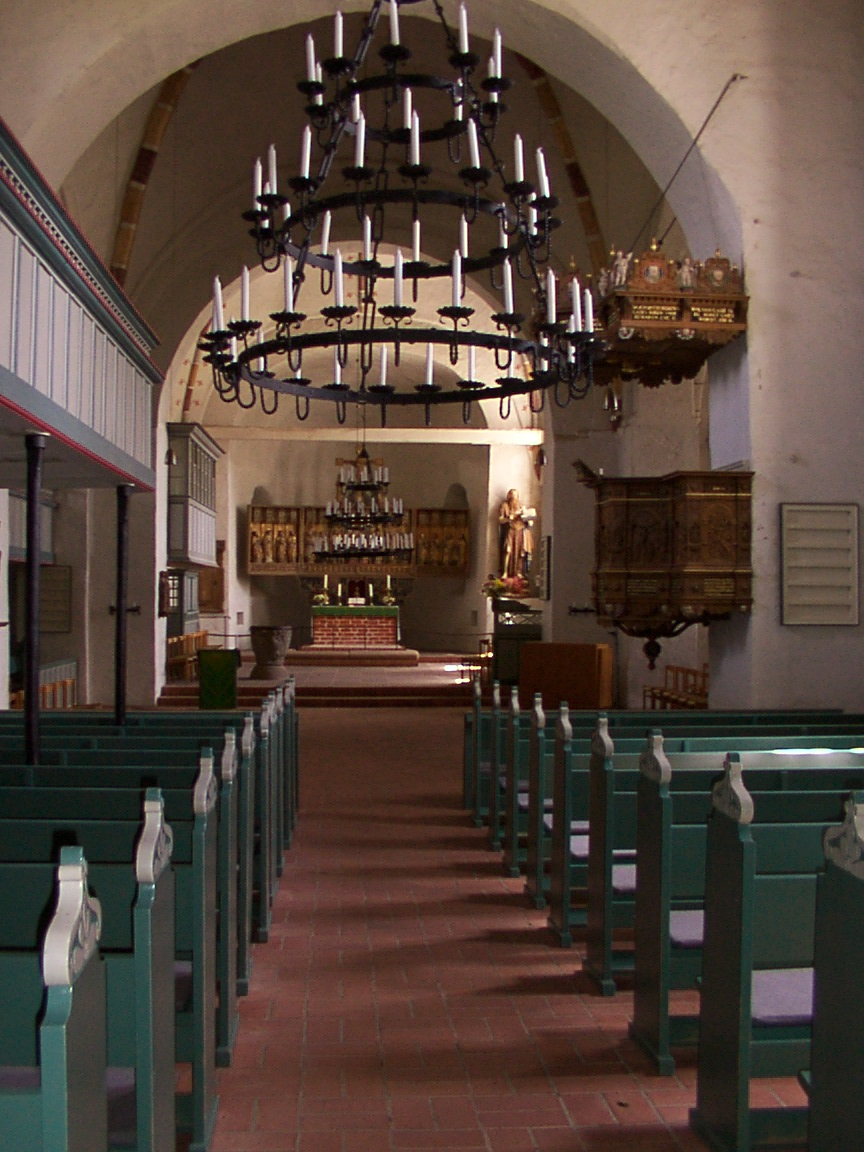
Interior of St. John's church

Bronze age burial mound in Goting

Nieblum is the home to the Church of St. John, which is surrounding by historically preserved graveyard. Many of the village's houses have thatched roofs.

Since the 1950s, the Ernst Schlee school of Hamburg-Klein-Flottbek had been operating a summer boarding school in Nieblum. After conversion into a public trading school, the institution was transferred to the Othmarschen high school.

1979, Nieblum was awarded as (West-)Germany's most beautiful village. Südlich von Nieblum befindet sich der Leuchtturm Nieblum

In the village of Goting, which was incorporated into Nieblum in 1970, various bronze age burial mounds are worth a visit. In Goting the streets have frisian names. The burial mound Thinghugh in Thingwai street might have been an old germanic place of judgment (thing) in the early Middle Ages.

== Economy ==
Climate change has made it possible to grow wine on Föhr since 2009. Wine is grown on an area of 6 hectares (2022). A winery can be visited between Goting and Nieblum.

== Notable people ==
- Jens Jacob Eschels (1757-1842), navigator. He became known by his autobiography.
- Carl-Christian Arfsten (1889-1969), politician (CDU) and Schleswig-Holstein MP
