= Föhr =

Island in Schleswig-Holstein, Germany

Native name: Feer
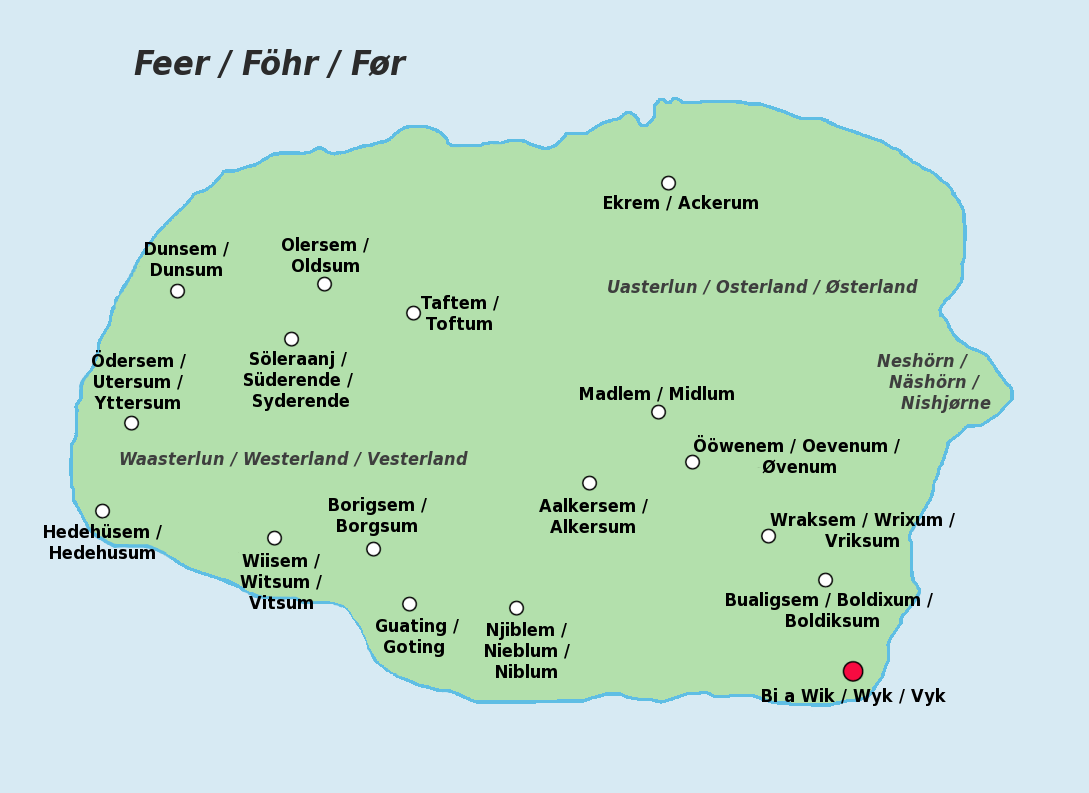
- Trilingual map of Föhr (North Frisian, German and Danish place names)

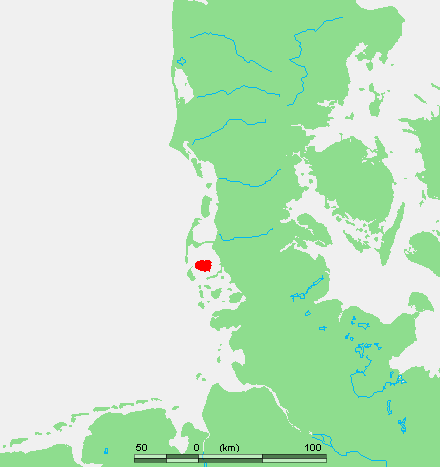

Geography
- Location: Wadden Sea
- Coordinates: 54°43′N 8°30′E
- Archipelago: North Frisian Islands
- Major islands: Sylt, Föhr, Amrum
- Area: 82.82 km^{2} (31.98 sq mi)
- Length: 12 km (7.5 mi)
- Width: 6.8 km (4.23 mi)
- Highest elevation: 13 m (43 ft)

Administration
- Germany
- State: Schleswig-Holstein
- District: Nordfriesland

Demographics
- Population: 8,248 (31 December 2017)
- Pop. density: 104/km^{2} (269/sq mi)
- Ethnic groups: Germans, Frisians, Danes

Additional information
- Official website: www.foehr.de

Föhr (German pronunciation: [føːɐ̯]; Fering North Frisian: Feer; Danish: Før) is one of the North Frisian Islands on the German coast of the North Sea. It is part of the Nordfriesland district in the federal state of Schleswig-Holstein. Föhr is the second-largest North Sea island of Germany and a popular destination for tourists. A town and eleven distinct municipalities are located on the island. The climate is oceanic with moderate winters and relatively cool summers.

Being a settlement area already in Neolithic times, Föhr had been part of mainland North Frisia until 1362. Then the coastline was destroyed by a heavy storm flood known as Saint Marcellus's flood (Middle Low German: Grote Mandrenke, 'Great Drowning of Men') and several islands were formed, Föhr among them. The northern parts of Föhr consist of marshes while the southern parts consist of sandy geest. From the middle-ages until 1864, Föhr belonged to the Danish realm and to the Duchy of Schleswig, but was then transferred to Prussia as a result of the Second Schleswig War. Seafaring has long been the most popular trade, but farming and eventually tourism became the most important economic factors after the end of the Age of Sail. The island can be reached by a car and passenger ferry service or via an airstrip.

Apart from German, a dialect of the North Frisian language, Fering, is frequently spoken on Föhr. Several authors and poets have also written in Fering.

== Geography ==
Föhr is situated southeast of Sylt; it is the second-largest German North Sea island. Among those German islands which are accessible only by ship or airplane Föhr is the most populous and has the largest surface.

Föhr is called "The Green Island" due to being sheltered from the storms of the North Sea by its neighbouring islands Sylt and Amrum, so that Föhr's vegetation is thriving compared to that of the other islands. It is 6.8 kilometres wide and 12 km long; the surface measures 82.82 km^{2}. While the northern parts are marshland, the south consists of higher geestland. The highest elevation measures 13 m above mean sea level and is located on the geestland ridge between the villages of Nieblum and Midlum. The geest makes up about two fifths of Föhr's total area and most villages are located there. In the marshlands, a number of solitary farmsteads can be found, which were moved out of the villages during the 1960s.

Until the Grote Mandrenke flooding in 1362, Föhr had been part of the mainland, connected by deep tidal creeks.

Föhr, like its neighbour islands, is a popular tourist resort. From the ferry terminal a sandy beach of about 15 km length extends all along Föhr's southern shore and halfway up the western coast. North and northwest of Föhr the Reserved Area I of the Schleswig-Holstein Wadden Sea National Park is located.

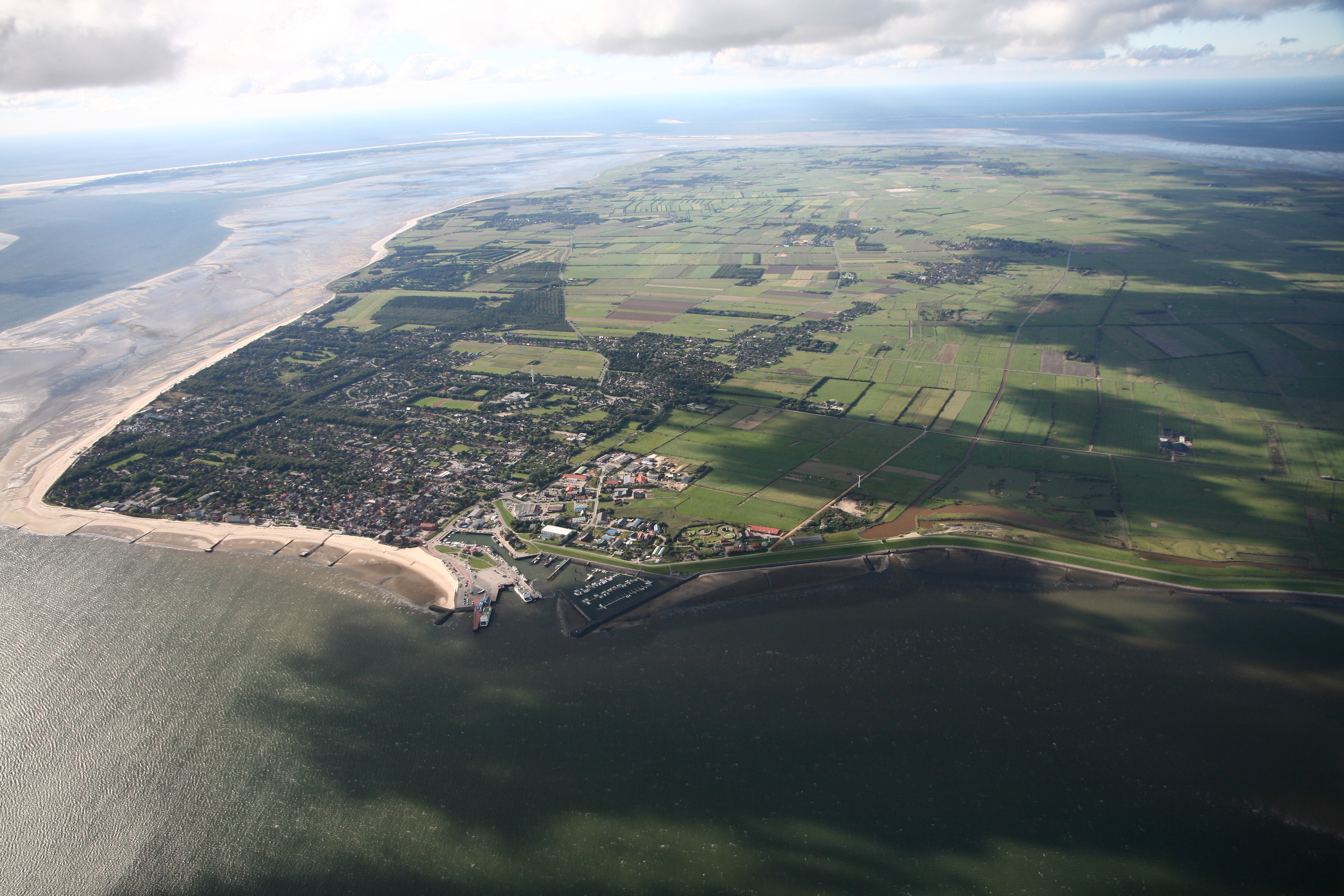
Aerial view of Föhr

Föhr's population counts 8,592 (as of 1 December 2010). The only town on the island is Wyk on its south-eastern coast which is a popular seaside resort. In addition there are sixteen small villages on Föhr which are distributed among eleven municipalities. They adhere to the Amt Föhr-Amrum:

- Alkersum (Fering: Aalkersem)
- Borgsum (Borigsem)
- Dunsum (Dunsem), comprising Lesser and Greater Dunsum
- Midlum (Madlem)
- Nordseebad Nieblum (Njiblem) with its neighbourhood Goting (Guating)
- Oevenum (Ööwnem)
- Oldsum (Olersem) with the districts of Toftum (Taftem) and Klintum (Klantem)
- Süderende (Söleraanj)
- Nordseebad Utersum (Ödersem) with the hamlet of Hedehusum (Hedehüsem)
- Witsum (Wiisem)
- Wrixum (Wraksem)

A local peculiarity is that almost all place names end with the suffix -um, which means "home".

== Climate ==
Föhr features a moderate oceanic climate. The beneficial effects of the local climate and seawater on certain medical conditions inspired the physician Carl Haeberlin (1870–1954) from Wyk to develop treatments for climatotherapy and thalassotherapy at the beginning of the 20th century. He became the pioneer of these disciplines in Germany.

Climate data for Wrixum (1961–1990 averages)
Month	Jan	Feb	Mar	Apr	May	Jun	Jul	Aug	Sep	Oct	Nov	Dec	Year
Daily mean °C (°F)	1.1 (34.0)	0.9 (33.6)	3.0 (37.4)	6.4 (43.5)	11.0 (51.8)	14.4 (57.9)	15.8 (60.4)	16.1 (61.0)	13.8 (56.8)	10.3 (50.5)	5.7 (42.3)	2.4 (36.3)	8.4 (47.1)
Average precipitation mm (inches)	61.6 (2.43)	36.2 (1.43)	48.4 (1.91)	41.7 (1.64)	44.2 (1.74)	63.1 (2.48)	68.8 (2.71)	70.8 (2.79)	88.2 (3.47)	97.5 (3.84)	97.4 (3.83)	74.9 (2.95)	792.8 (31.21)
Mean monthly sunshine hours	42.4	71.0	110.2	169.8	229.3	229.7	213.4	213.6	139.5	89.3	50.0	38.1	1,596
Source: German Meteorological Service

== History ==
Burial mound near Nieblum

The higher geestland cores of the North Frisian islands, scattered between ample marshlands, attracted settlers when the sea level rose at the end of the Neolithic. Gravesites and several minor artifacts found on Föhr bear witness to this. Various burial mounds from the Bronze Age can be seen on Föhr, especially in the southwest and southeast between the villages Goting and Nieblum.

The Lembecksburg, a 9th-century ringwall

When the Frisians colonised the area of modern Nordfriesland during the 7th century, their first settlements were erected on Föhr, according to archaeological findings. The formerly sparsely inhabited island witnessed a steep rise of population. A rather large amount of jewellery originating from Scandinavia that was found in graves of the time points out a vivid connection to northern Europe. From the age of the Vikings, several ring walls, the Lembecksburg near Borgsum among them, are preserved.

The Danish Census Book of King Valdemar II of Denmark tells of two Harden on Föhr, which were territorial subdivisions of the time. The Westerharde Föhr was at times the refuge of a pirate serving the Danish. In 1368 the Westerharde, which also included Amrum, was transferred to the Counts of Holstein under the supervision of the knight Klaus Lembeck, bailiff of Ribe. In 1400 the Harde surrendered to Queen Margaret I of Denmark and remained within Ribe County. Until 1864 the western part of Föhr, together with Amrum, belonged to the Danish Enclaves in North Frisia while Osterland and Wyk belonged to the Duchy of Schleswig since it had seceded from the Danish Kingdom in the 1420s. Together with the Wiedingharde, the Bökingharde, the isle of Strand and Sylt, Osterland in 1426 signed the "Compact of the Seven Hundreds" (German: Siebenhardenbeliebung) with Duke Henry IV of Schleswig, which stated that the Hundreds intended to keep their judicial autonomy.

In 1523 the northern marshlands of Föhr were shut off against the sea by dikes and 22 hectares of new farming land were won. Beginning in 1526, the Protestant Reformation began to introduce the Lutheran confession on Föhr, which was completed in 1530.

In the 17th century a private navigation school was established in Süderende by pastor Richardus Petri which was the first of its kind on the island. It improved the situation of the seafaring population considerably and soon other navigators opened their own schools across Föhr. Although Petri led the Süderende school successfully for many years he never went to sea himself. Eschels (1757–1842) writes, however, that in his youth, learning to navigate was still unpopular among many young sailors from Föhr because it smacked of elitism. Eventually though, these navigation schools enjoyed a high reputation far beyond the island. Subsequently, whaling brought about a Golden Age for Föhr. During the 17th and 18th century most Dutch and English whaling ships would have a crew of Frisians from the islands. Around the year 1700 Föhr had a total population of roughly 6,000 people, 1,600 of whom were whalers. At the height of Dutch whaling in the year 1762, 1,186 mariners from Föhr were serving on Dutch vessels at Greenland and Svalbard and 25% of all shipmasters on Dutch whaling vessels were people from Föhr. In the late 18th century a thousand sailors, 150 Commanders among them, were living on Föhr. Still today the exquisitely decorated houses of the Commanders can be seen in Nieblum and Süderende. The so-called "talking tombstones" in the cemeteries of the three churches on Föhr account for their vitae. Yet with the decline of the whale populations ever fewer men would go sailing and the people of Föhr focused on agriculture again. Notable seafarers from Föhr include Matthias Petersen (1632–1706) and Jens Jacob Eschels.

However, when their farmsteads turned out to provide an insufficient income for a family in the mid-19th century, many people from Föhr chose to emigrate to North America. There they settled mainly in California becoming chicken farmers, and in New York City where they established themselves in the delicatessen business. Other factors for leaving the island were unemployment, and the mandatory Prussian military service that was introduced after the Second Schleswig War.

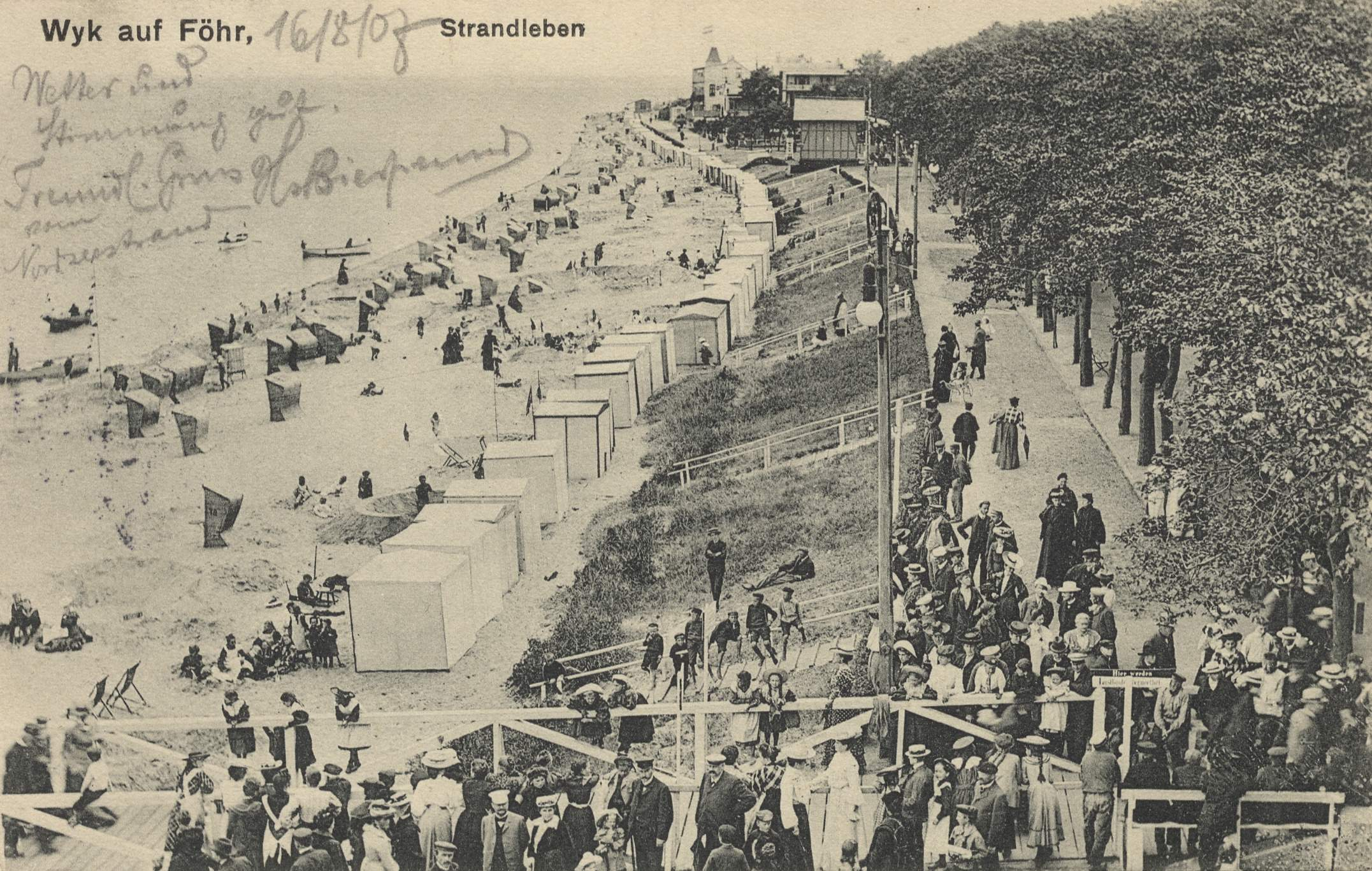
Beach life in Wyk in 1907

After 1842, when King Christian VIII of Denmark chose Föhr as his summer residence, the island became popular as a tourist resort.

During the Second Schleswig War, Danish Lieutenant Commander Otto Christian Hammer, commanding a flotilla in the North Frisian Isles, resided in Wyk auf Föhr and was able to defend the islands against superior Austrian and Prussian naval forces. He was eventually captured by Prussian Lieutenant Ernst von Prittwitz und Gaffron. On 17 July 1864, while Hammer was at sea, 250 Austrian troops landed on Föhr and occupied the island until November 1864. In the aftermath of that war and the subsequent Austro-Prussian War, Prussia annexed Schleswig-Holstein in 1867 and Föhr became part of the Prussian Schleswig-Holstein Province.

The three hamlets of Utersum, Witsum and Hedehusum were the only ones to vote for Denmark in Zone II of the Schleswig Plebiscites in 1920; yet as they were not located directly at the border they remained within Germany.

On 1 January 2007 the formerly independent municipal entities of Amt Föhr-Land, Amt Amrum and Wyk auf Föhr were merged into one municipality (Amt) Föhr-Amrum.

== Language and culture ==
=== Language ===
A major part of the population in the west of the island speaks, besides German, a local idiom of the North Frisian language known as Fering or Föhring. Fering is again divided into the two dialects of Westerland Föhr and Osterland Föhr, being the western and eastern halves of the island respectively. In Osterland Low German is more popular than Fering and especially in Wyk the traditional language is Standard German.

During the whaling campaigns from the 17th to the early 19th centuries, many seafarers from Föhr changed their Fering birth names to Dutch names because they were regarded as being more practical for their work abroad and more fashionable at home. Many Dutch loanwords were also introduced to Fering at that time and are still in use today.

There are various interpretations concerning the origin of the name Föhr and its original Frisian name Feer. Current etymological studies suggest that Föhr and also Amrum have names rooted in maritime tradition. A 19th-century author wrote that the name derived from the old ferry between Föhr and Nordmarsch, which was just a narrow crossing in the Middle Ages. Another likely root is the Frisian feer which means "barren" and has been attributed to the island's geest core. Until the 19th century, these parts had been heavily podsolised.

On the island, there is also a Danish minority with a Danish school.

=== Tradition ===
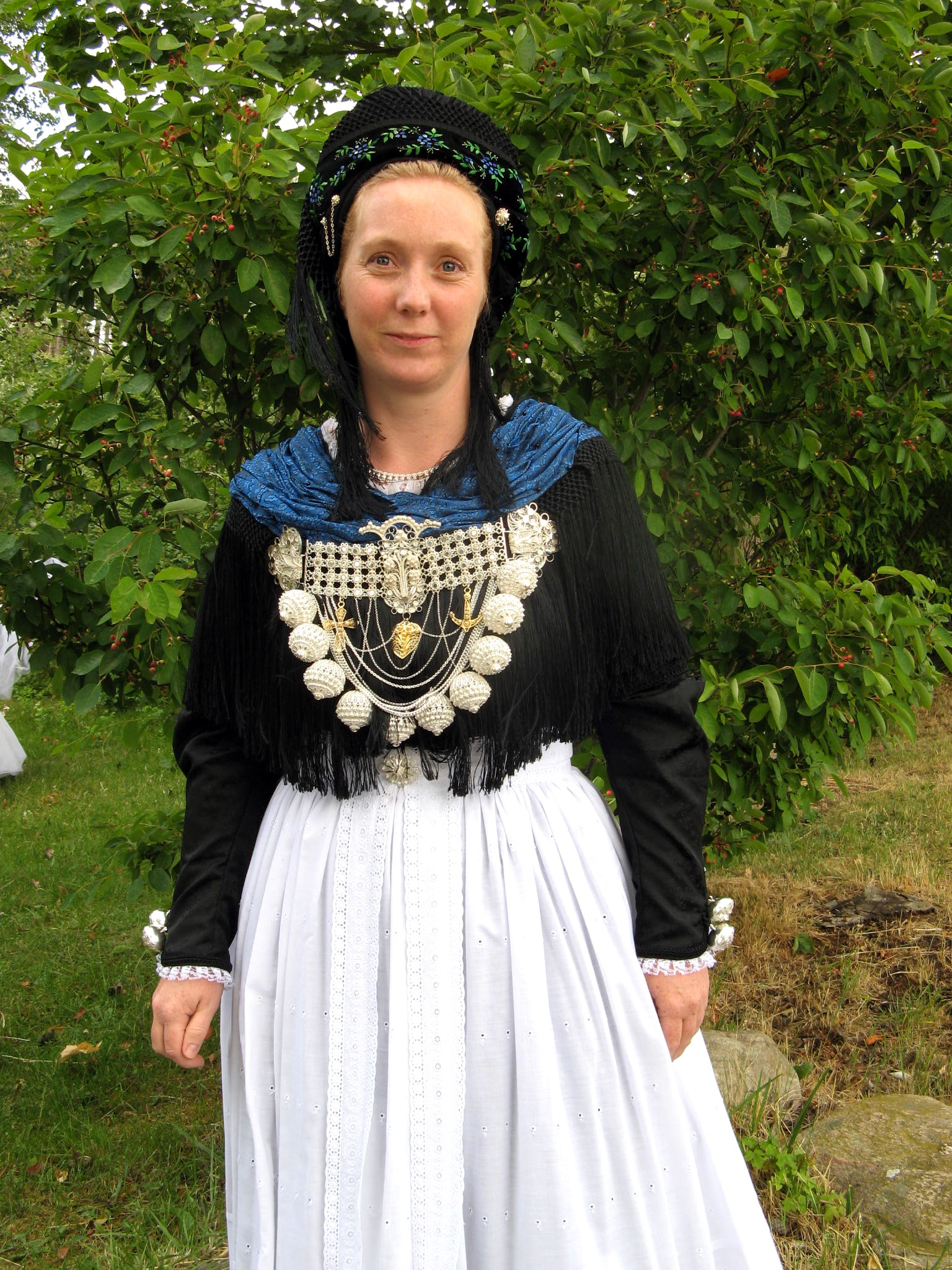
Traditional costume for women

On special occasions, mainly in the western parts of the island, women may wear their traditional costumes. Several popular customs are kept on Föhr, such as Biikebrennen on 21 February with a great bonfire and the Tamsen (or Thamsen, named after Thomas the Apostle) on 21 December where young people play pranks on others by hiding things that can spin and turn around.

During the Christmas season a special kind of Christmas tree exists on Föhr and other North Frisian islands, the so-called kenkenbuum. It consists of a wooden frame which is decorated with a wreath of green leaves. The inner parts carry figures made of dough, including animals and Adam and Eve. On New Year's Eve, groups of people dress up in costumes and walk from house to house to let others guess their true identity (similar to Halloween). According to their age, they are treated with either sweets or alcoholic drinks. In Fering, this tradition is called ütj tu kenknin; the people of Wyk call it Rummelrotje. It corresponds to the Hulken on Amrum.

In the times when great parts of the male population on Föhr were seafarers, they would spend the winter at home on the island. In the afternoon the bachelors would meet at twilight (Fering: hualewjonken) for social gatherings. Today Hualewjonken is a get-together of confirmed bachelors below the age of 30.

=== Arts, literature and music ===
Oluf Braren (1787–1839), a naïve art painter, was born in Oldsum. Although largely ignored during his lifetime, his art became eventually popular in the 20th century. Today there are several professional artists working on Föhr and in Alkersum. There is a museum that exhibits notable international artists such as Emil Nolde, Edvard Munch or Max Liebermann.

There are also various Fering authors, among them Stine Andresen (1849–1927), who was a poet and writer from Wyk whose literature often refers to her native island. She published her poetry in German but also in Fering. In 1991, Ellin Nickelsen's novelette Jonk Bradlep ('Dark Wedding') was published. With it, she won the first ever held North Frisian literature competition.

The internationally successful Rock band Stanfour is based on Föhr.

The island has its own anthem, Leew Eilun Feer ('Beloved Isle of Föhr').

== Traffic ==
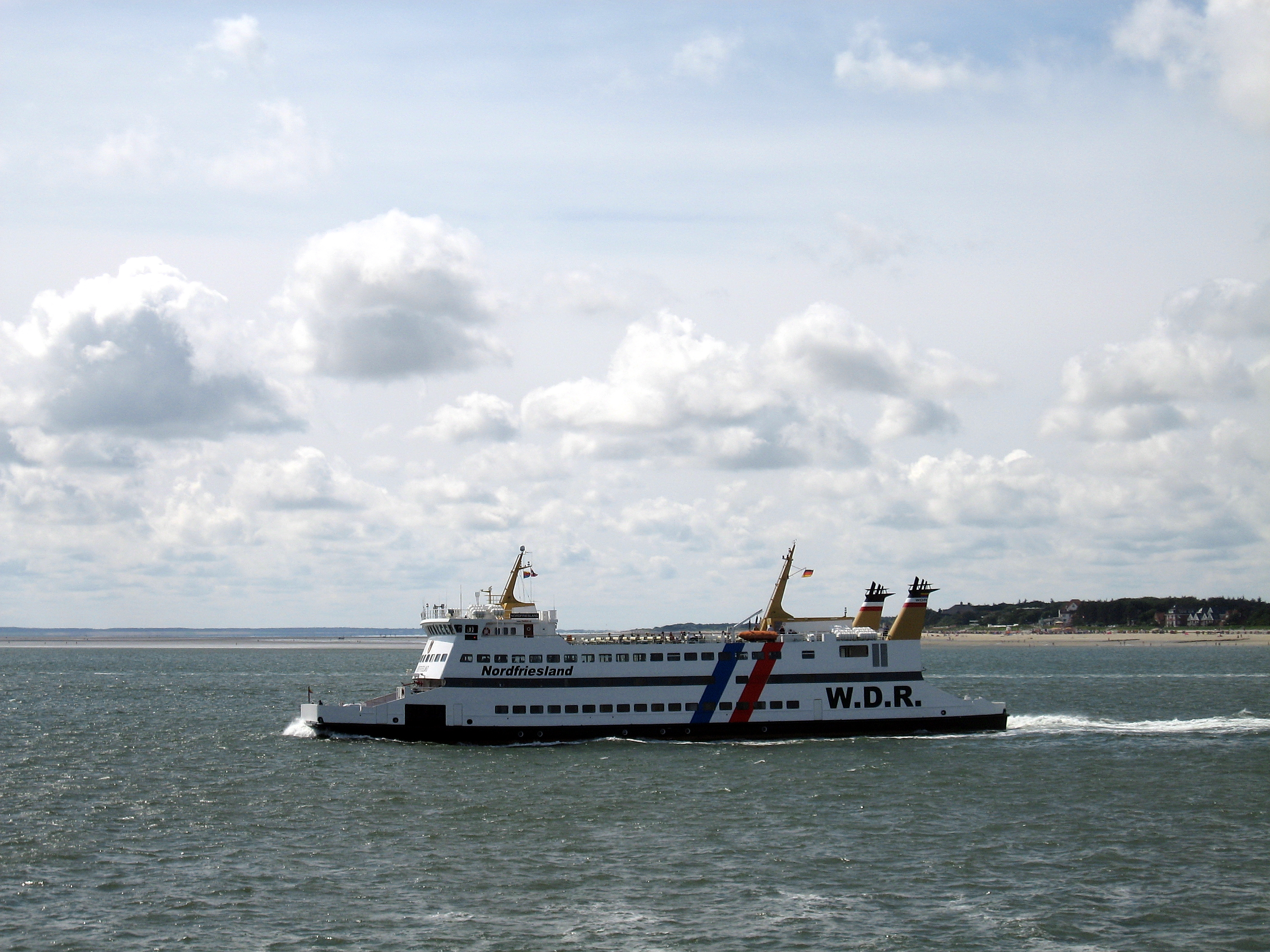
The MS Nordfriesland VI, a car and passenger ferry from the Wyker Dampfschiffs-Reederei Föhr-Amrum (W.D.R.) leaving Föhr.

The island is accessible by a car ferry connecting the mainland port of Dagebüll and the town of Wyk (approximately 10-12 sailings a day, crossing time approx. 45 minutes). The ferry port in Dagebüll is connected to the German road and railway networks. There are also frequent car ferry services from Föhr to the neighbouring island of Amrum (approx. 1 hour crossing time) as well as seasonal pedestrian ferries to Sylt and the Halligen.

A bus service connects Wyk to all of the island's villages. Föhr can also be reached by small airplanes via an airstrip.

== Economy ==
Föhr's economy is mainly dependent on tourism. Moreover, agriculture, mainly pasture farming, plays an important role. The harbour of Wyk hosts several mussel fishing boats. Climate change has made it possible to grow wine on the island since 2009. Wine is grown on an area of 6 hectares (2022). A winery can be visited between Goting and Nieblum.

=== Attractions ===
==== Wyk ====
Barn rebuilt in the open-air part of the museum

Sights include a bell tower (raised in 1886) as well as the Sandwall esplanade with its small music hall. Frisian customs and the history of Föhr are displayed at the Dr. Carl Haeberlin Frisian Museum, whose entrance is made up of two whale jaw bones. The museum has an open-air part where several old buildings from various villages were reconstructed using the original materials. Amica ventis is a windmill dating from 1879. Opposite the mill a well-kept park can be visited. Wrixumer Mühle is another windmill built in 1851 which was in operation until 1960. Boldixum is a former village which was incorporated into Wyk in 1924. Its church (St. Nicolai-Kirche) built in the 13th century is famous for its medieval wall-paintings which were discovered in 1969 when the church was renovated.

==== Church buildings ====
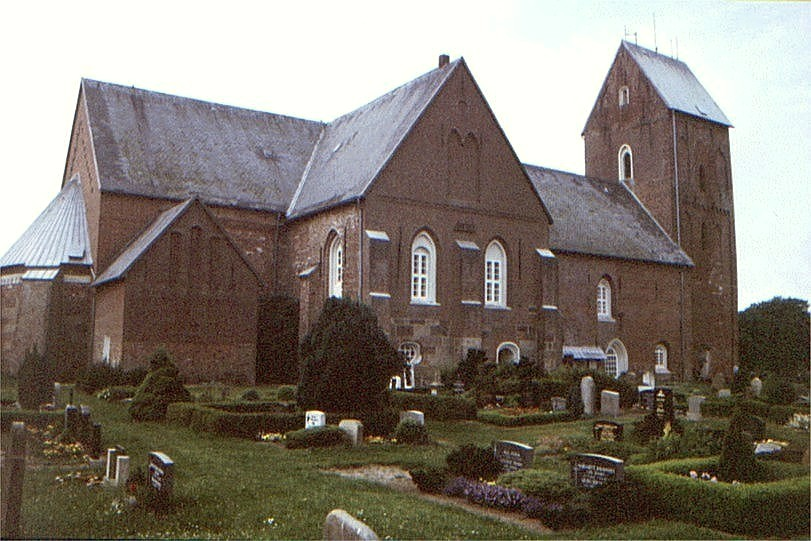
St. John's church in Nieblum

The island features three medieval churches from the 12th and 13th century. These are St. Nicolas' church in Wyk-Boldixum (also referred to as St. Nicolai), St. John's (St. Johannis) in Nieblum and St. Lawrence's (St. Laurentii) church in Süderende. The adjacent graveyards contain unusual tombstones which display entire vitae and may show pictures.

==== Windmills ====
On Föhr five windmills can be found, two of them in Wyk (a Dutch mill called Venti Amica from 1879 in the old town and a buck mill from Hallig Langeneß at the museum), as well as one in Wrixum (an octagonal Dutch mill), one in Borgsum (Octagonal Dutch mill, rebuilt in 1992 after the previous building was ruined by fire) and one in Oldsum (octagonal Dutch mill from 1901). All of them are privately owned except for the buck mill and the mill at Wrixum.

==== Duck decoys ====
In the marshlands six duck decoys can be visited. First established in the 18th century, these artificial ponds provided a pastime for sea captains and ships' officers during wintertime. Later the ponds were used to trap great numbers of wild ducks. In the pond at Oevenum, more than 3,000,000 ducks have been caught since its installation in 1735, and from 1885 to 1931 a factory in Wyk produced canned duck meat. The preserved meat was exported worldwide.

==== Wadden Sea ====
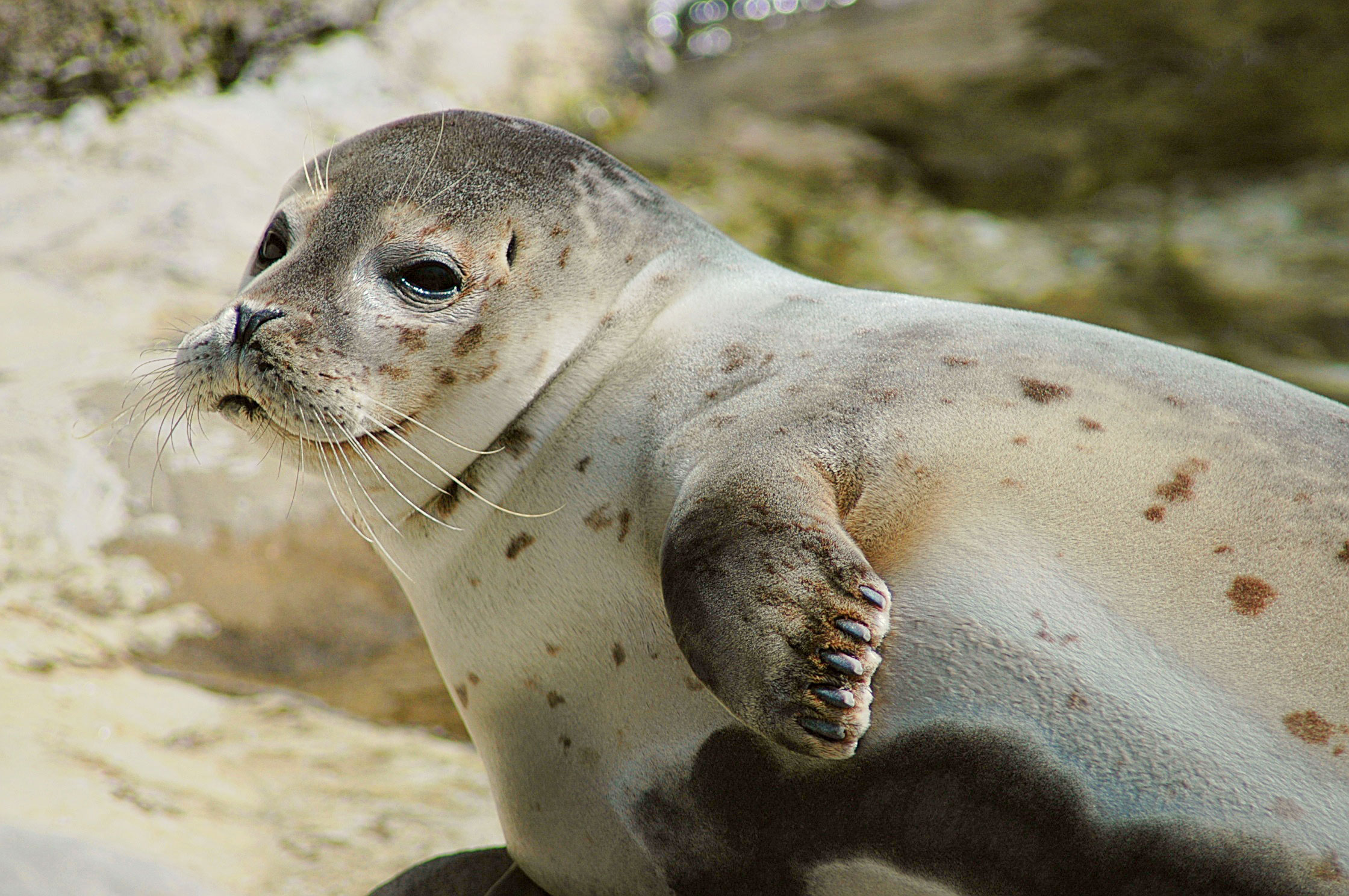
Harbour seal

The entire sea surrounding Föhr may also be designated an attraction. Mainly the foreland north of the sea dike, but also the mud flats provide ample space for all kinds of seabirds. Oystercatchers, common eiders, shelducks, snipes and peewits are only a few of them. Moreover, during the season vast swarms of migratory birds will rest at Föhr and the neighbouring islands. Occasionally, especially after severe winter storms, harbour seals may be encountered on the beaches.

The beach along the southern shore is popular for swimming. Also, during low tide it is possible to hike the mudflats from Amrum to Föhr.

== See also ==
- Islands of Germany
- Uthlande
