= Föhr North Frisian =

North Frisian dialect of Föhr, Germany

Föhr Frisian
- Fering
- Native to: Germany
- Region: Föhr, Nordfriesland
- Native speakers: 1,500 (2004 estimate)
- Language family: Indo-European: Germanic; West Germanic; North Sea Germanic; Anglo-Frisian; Frisian; North Frisian; Insular; Föhr–Amrum; Föhr Frisian

Language codes
- ISO 639-3: –
- Glottolog: ferr1240
- Linguasphere: 2-ACA-dbb to 2-ACA-dbd
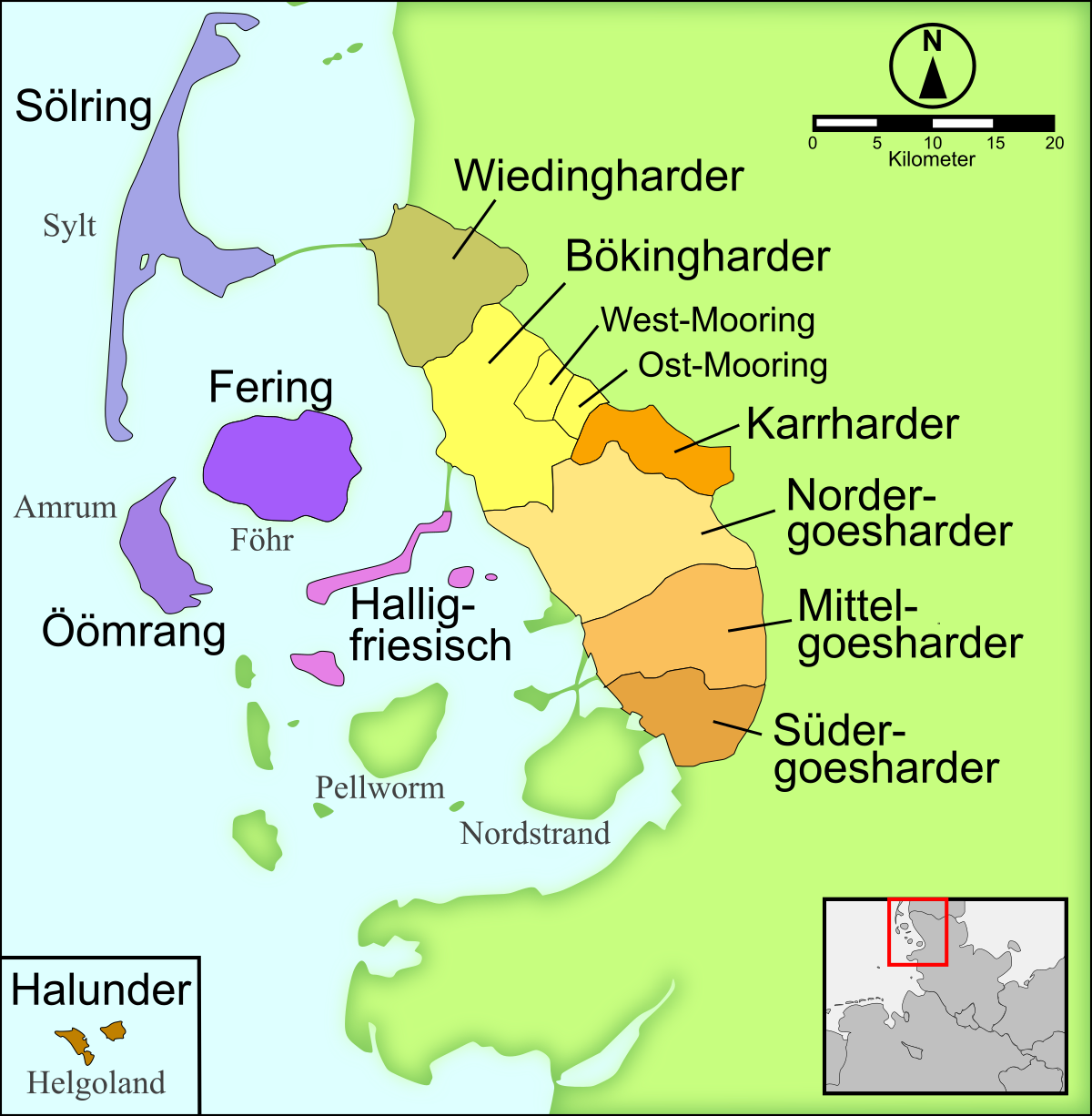
- North Frisian dialects

Föhr Frisian, or Fering, is the dialect of North Frisian spoken on the island of Föhr in the German region of North Frisia. Fering refers to the Fering Frisian name of Föhr, Feer. Highly similar to the Öömrang, it belongs to the Föhr-Amrum dialect group, and with the Söl'ring, and Heligolandic dialects, it forms part of the insular group of North Frisian dialects.

== Status ==
Around 3,000 of Föhr's 8,700 people speak Fering (1,500 of them being native speakers), constituting a third of all North Frisian speakers. Fering differs from other North Frisian dialects in that it is also used publicly on Föhr, not only at home. The municipalities of Oldsum and Süderende (Fering: Olersem, Söleraanj) in the western part of Föhr are strongholds of the dialect.

== Personal and family names ==
Personal names on Föhr are still today greatly influenced by a Frisian element. Notably hypocorisms and names with two elements are common. Early borrowings were made from the Danish language and the Christianisation of the North Frisians around 1000 A.D. brought a modest influence of Christian and biblical names. In the Age of Sail, Dutch and West Frisian forms became popular.

Family names were usually patronymic, i. e. they were individually created as genitives from the father's given name. Contrary to the Scandinavian Petersen or Petersson, meaning "Peter's son", a Fering name like Peters means "of Peter". This practice was prohibited by the Danish Crown in 1771 for the Duchy of Schleswig and was therefore abandoned in the eastern part of Föhr. As western Föhr was a direct part of the Danish kingdom until 1864, patronyms were in use there until 1828 when they were forbidden in Denmark proper as well.

== Dialects ==
There are three dialects of Fering: Weesdring in Western Föhr, Aasdring in Eastern Föhr, and Boowentaareps in Southern Föhr.

== Phonology ==
Short monophthongs of the Föhr dialect on a vowel chart, based on formant values in Bohn (2004:164)

Long monophthongs of the Föhr dialect on a vowel chart, based on formant values in Bohn (2004:164)

The r is always pronounced as alveolar trill. Initial s is always voiceless.

The diphthongs ia, ua and ui as well as the triphthong uai are falling diphthongs, i.e. the stress is always on the first vowel.

== Orthography ==
The current orthographic rules for Fering and Öömrang were defined in 1971. Previously, linguists like L. C. Peters, Otto Bremer and Reinhard Arfsten had each created their own Fering orthography. Long vowels including those with umlauts are always written as double letters while consonants are short by default. Capital letters are only used in the beginning of a sentence and for proper names.

letter(s)	value(s) in IPA	notes
a	/a/	
aa	/ʌː/	
au	/au̯/	
ä	/ɛ/	
ää	/ɛː/	
äi	/ɛi/	
b	/b/	
ch	/x/	
d	/d/	
dj	/dj/	
e	/ɛ/, /ə/	Becomes schwa when unstressed
ee	/eː/	
f	/f/	
g	/ɡ/	
h	/h/	
i	/ɪ/	
ia	/ia̯/	
ii	/iː/	
j	/j/	
k	/k/	
l	/l/	
lj	/lj/	
m	/m/	
n	/n/	
ng	/ŋ/	
nj	/nj/	
o	/ɔ/	
oi	/ʌːi̯/	
oo	/oː/	
ö	/œ/	
öi	/øi̯/	
öö	/øː/	
p	/p/	
r	/r/	
s	/s/, /z/	"s" is always /s/ in initial position, /z/ between vowels
sch	/ʃ/	
t	/t/	
tj	/tj/	
u	/ʊ/	
ua	/ua̯/	
uai	/ua̯i̯/	
ui	/ui̯/	
uu	/uː/	
ü	/ʏ/	
üü	/yː/	
w	/v/	

Although there is a standard orthography, there is still spelling variation. This could partly be because many Fering speakers only learned how to spell standard German in school. For example, the North Frisian nationalist slogan "lewer duad üs Slaw!" (better dead than a slave) often appears along with the flag or crest of Föhr and has spelling variants including: leewer duad üüs Slaaw, lewer duaad üs Slaaw, and lewer duad üs Slav.

== Grammar ==
=== Nouns ===
==== Gender ====
Fering originally had three genders: masculine, feminine and neuter. However during the course of the twentieth century the feminine and neuter genders have combined.

==== Number ====
Fering nouns have two numbers – singular and plural. There are two major suffixes used to form the plural: "-er" and "-en". Nouns with a masculine gender often use the "-er" plural (although there are a few feminine/neuter nouns in this group) and nouns with a feminine/neuter gender often use the "-en" plural (there are a few masculine nouns in this group). Plurals can also be formed using "-in", "-n" and "-s". There are also plurals formed by changing a consonant at the end of the word, by changing a vowel within the word or by retaining the same form as the singular. Occasionally the plural form is formed by using a different word.

- An example of a masculine noun using the "-er" plural suffix: hünj (dog) – hünjer (dogs). Nouns can also lose an unstressed vowel, as is the case with kurew (basket) – kurwer (baskets). Some nouns undergo a vowel change, such as smas (blacksmith) – smeser (blacksmiths).

There are exceptions in this suffix group, including wöning (window; a feminine/neuter noun) which forms the plural by removing a syllable – wönger' (windows), and insel (island; also a feminine/neuter noun, and a German loanword) which form forms the plural by removing an unstressed vowel – insler (islands).

- An example of a feminine/neuter noun using the "-en" plural suffix: buk (book) – buken (books). Nouns can also lose an unstressed vowel, as is the case with foomen (woman) – foomnen (women) and taarep (village) – taarpen (villages).
- An example of a (feminine/neuter) noun using the "-en" plural suffix: baantje (office – i.e., a type of position) – baantjin (offices).
- An example of a (masculine) noun using the "-n" plural suffix: mooler (painter) – moolern (painters).
- An example of a (masculine) noun using the "-s" plural suffix: koptein (captain) – kopteins (captains).
- Examples of masculine nouns which retain the same form as the singular include: stian (stone(s)), karmen (man, men), lüs (louse, lice), steewel (boot(s)) and twanling (twin(s)).
- Examples of feminine/neuter nouns which retain the same form as the singular include: bian (bone(s), leg(s), gris (piglet(s)), schep (sheep, singular and plural) and swin (pig(s)).

=== Verbs ===
In Fering, there are three groups of verbs: weak, strong and irregular verbs.

=== Personal pronouns ===
Fering pronouns can be singular or plural. There used to be a dual form but it is no longer used. The formal is rarely used.

	Singular						Plural		
Case	First Person	Second Person		Third Person			First Person	Second Person	Third Person
English nominative	I	you	you (formal)	he	she	it	we	you	they
Nominative (subject form)	ik	dü	i	hi	hat	at	wi	jam	jo
Accusative and Dative (object form)	mi	di	jau	ham	ham	at	üs	jam	jo

==== Possessive Pronouns ====
			The noun		
			Singular		Plural
			Masculine	Feminine/neuter	
The owner	Singular	ik	man	min	minen
The owner	Singular	dü	dan	din	dinen
The owner	Singular	hi	san	sin	sinen
The owner	Singular	hat	san	sin	sinen
The owner	Singular	at	san	sin	sinen
The owner	Plural	wi	üüs		üüsen
The owner	Plural	jam	jau		jauen
The owner	Plural	jo	hör		hören

== Loanwords ==
Apart from Dutch names, the seafarers in Dutch service also introduced many loanwords in Dutch language to Fering which are still in use today. It has been observed that apart from Afrikaans, no other language outside the Netherlands proper has been influenced as much by the Dutch language as the North Frisian insular dialects. Examples for Fering include:

Fering	Dutch	English
al of ei	al of niet	(whether) ... or not
bak	bak	wooden bowl
bekuf	bekaf	exhausted
kofe	koffie	coffee
skraal	schraal	lean, meagre
det spiit mi	dat spijt mij	I'm sorry

Other loanwords were derived from American English when many people emigrated from Föhr to the United States but kept contact with their relatives on the island. Examples include:

Fering	English
gaabitsch	garbage can
friiser	freezer
sink	sink

== Literature ==
There are various Fering authors. One of the first publicly noticed writers was Arfst Jens Arfsten (1812–1899) who began writing anecdotes in Fering around 1855. Others include Stine Andresen (1849–1927) who was a poet and writer from Wyk whose literature often refers to her native island. She published her poetry in German but also in Fering. In 1991, Ellin Nickelsen's novelette Jonk Bradlep (Dark Wedding) was published. With it, she won the first ever held North Frisian literature competition.

== See also ==
- Leew Eilun Feer
- Low German
