= List of Frisians =

This is a list of famous or notable persons considered Frisians by citizenship, ethnicity or nationality.

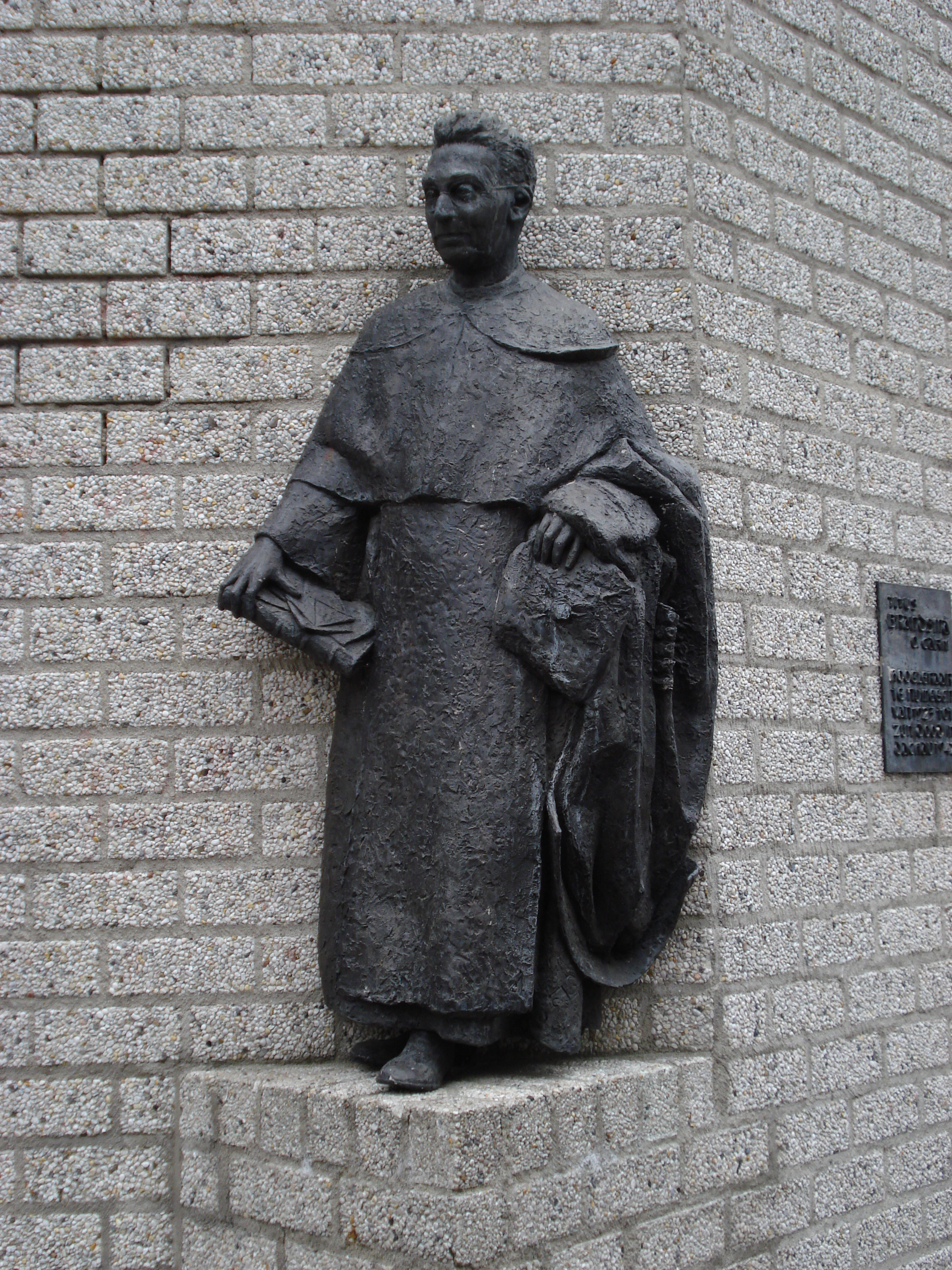
Statue of Frisian priest Titus Brandsma, O.Carm. in Nijmegen

== A ==
- Bernard Accama (1697–1756), 18th-century painter from Friesland
- Lawrence Alma-Tadema (1836–1912), Dutch painter from Dronrijp
- Stine Andresen (1849–1927), poet from Föhr who also wrote in Fering; befriended poet Friedrich Hebbel

== B ==
- Nicolaas Baur (1736–1817), portrait painter from Harlingen
- Eggerik Beninga (1490–1562), East Frisian chronicler
- William Bergsma (1921–1994), American composer of Frisian descent
- Bernlef (died 809), Frisian bard and convert to Christianity
- Titus Brandsma (1881–1942), Carmelite priest of the Roman Catholic Church, anti-Nazi Dutch resistance voice
- Hinrich Braren (1751–1826), nautical examiner from Föhr; wrote the first textbook on navigation in German language
- Oluf Braren (1787–1839), painter from Föhr
- Dan Bylsma, NHL head coach for the Pittsburgh Penguins (born 1970), of Frisian descent

== C ==
- Franciscus Carree (c. 1630), was made the first painter of William Frederick, Prince of Nassau-Dietz
- Peter Harry Carstensen (born 1947), Minister-President of Schleswig-Holstein from 2005 to 2012

== D ==
- Edsger Dijkstra (1930–2002), computer scientist
- Everett Dirksen (1896–1969), American politician of the Republican Party; parents were born in East Frisia
- Pier Gerlofs Donia (1480–1520), Frisian freedom fighter and folk hero; founder of the Arumer Black Heap
- Ennik Somi Douma (stage name Jeon Somi, born 2001), South Korean-Canadian singer
- Lenny Dykstra, Major League baseball player for the New York Mets (1985–1989) and Philadelphia Phillies (1989–1996)

== E ==
- Fred Eaglesmith, Canadian folk singer; original last name was Elgersma
- Gerard Edema (1652–1700?), Dutch landscape-painter who settled in England
- Edzard the Great (1461–1528), count of East Frisia from 1491 until his death in 1528
- Dieter Eilts, football (soccer) player; nicknamed the Alemão of East Frisia; won the UEFA European Championship 1996 with Germany
- Eise Eisinga (1744–1828), Frisian amateur astronomer and builder of the oldest working planetaria in the world
- Ubbo Emmius (1547–1625), professor of history and Greek
- Heiko Engelkes (1933–2008), German journalist born in Norden, East Frisia
- Jens Jacob Eschels (1757–1842), seafarer and entrepreneur; became known by his autobiography
- Maurits Cornelis Escher (1898–1972), graphic artist born in Leeuwarden
- Balthasar Oomkens von Esens (died 1540), East Frisian nobleman who opposed House Cirksena
- Rudolf Eucken (1846–1926), German philosopher; winner of the 1908 Nobel Prize for Literature

== F ==
- David Fabricius (1564–1617), astronomer and theologian
- Johannes Fabricius (1587–1616), astronomer and a discoverer of sunspots, independently of Galileo Galilei
- Pieter Feddes van Harlingen (1586–1623), Dutch Golden Age painter
- Bernard Fokke (1600–1641), on whom the Flying Dutchman is said to be based
- Jane Fonda, actress with Frisian ancestry
- Magnus Forteman (~809), legendary commander and magistrate governor of Friesland
- William Frankena (1908–1994), American philosopher of Ethics; scholar in history of ethics; played role in controversies of the 1950s
- Josh Freese, American musician of Frisian descent
- Gemma Frisius (1508–1555), mathematician and cartographer

== G ==
- Ygo Gales Galama (1443–1493), infamous medieval warlord; Galama-family patriarch
- Wybrand de Geest (1592 – c. 1661), Dutch Golden Age portrait painter
- Pieter Sjoerds Gerbrandy (1885–1961), prime minister of the Dutch government in exile during World War II

== H ==
- Tamme Hanken (1960–2016), German horse whisperer and bonesetter from Filsum
- Mata Hari (born Margaretha Geertruida Zelle, August 7, 1876, in Leeuwarden, Friesland), famous dancer, courtesan; executed as a spy in France, October 1917
- Wiebbe Hayes (born c. 1608), Colonial soldier hero from Winschoten
- Simon Heere Heeresma (1932–2011), Dutch author and poet
- Hendrik Eelke Hiddinga (1942), Professional cyclist
- Meindert Hobbema (1638–1709), Dutch Golden Age painter

== I ==
- Dodo zu Innhausen und Knyphausen (1583–1636), professional soldier from Lütetsburg, East Frisia; field marshal in Swedish service during the Thirty Years' War (1618–1648)
- Ub Iwerks (1901–1971), American animator, cartoonist, character designer, inventor, and special effects technician; co-created Mickey Mouse

== J ==
- Gysbert Japiks (1603–1666), Frisian writer, poet, schoolteacher and cantor
- Wijard Jelckama (1490–1523), Frisian freedom fighter, nephew of Pier Gerlofs Donia and who later led the Frisian rebellion (Arumer Black Heap)
- Tako Hajo Jelgersma (1702–1795), 18th-century Dutch painter
- William Harry Jellema (1893–1982), American philosopher
- Carl Ludwig Jessen (1833–1917), North Frisian Naturalist painter

== K ==
- Joost Klein (born November 10, 1997, in Leeuwarden, Friesland), Dutch musician, rapper, singer and former YouTuber
- Wilhelm von Knyphausen (1716–1800), general from Hesse-Cassel; fought in the American Revolutionary War, during which he led Hessian mercenaries on behalf of the British Empire
- Tjalling Koopmans (1910–1985), Dutch American mathematician and economist; Nobel Prize Laureate in Economic Sciences
- Sven Kramer, Dutch long track speed skater
- Doutzen Kroes (born January 23, 1985, in Eastermar, Friesland), Dutch supermodel

== L ==
- Anna-Marie Lampe, Playboy magazine (US edition) 40th anniversary Playmate/Playmate of the Month for January 1994; Playboy magazine (Dutch edition) Playmate of the year for 1995
- Cynthia Lenige (1755–1780), poet
- Abe Lenstra (1920–1985), Dutch football player and national football icon in the 1950s
- Boy Lornsen (1922–1995), author and sculptor from Sylt, Germany
- Jack R. Lousma, astronaut with Frisian ancestry

== M ==
- Theodor Mommsen (1817–1903), received the Nobel Prize in Literature in 1902; German politician, member of the Prussian and German parliaments
- Hans Momsen (1735–1811), North Frisian farmer, layman mathematician and astronomer
- F. W. Matthiessen (1835–1918) Born in Altona, Denmark, Descendant of Matthias Petersen (Matthias der Gluckliche), co-founder of Matthiessen and Hegeler Zinc Works in LaSalle, IL (USA), Founder of Westclox (now General Time), Philanthropist, Matthiessen State Park Deer Park, IL (USA)
- Jens Mungard (1885–1940), poet

== O ==
- Hark Olufs (1708–1754), sailor from Amrum; was enslaved by Algerian pirates; eventually became Commander in Chief of the Bey of Constantine's cavalry
- Christian von Ompteda (1765–1815), commander in the Napoleonic Wars
- Jürgen Ovens (1623–1678), portrait painter from North Frisia; said to have been a pupil of Rembrandt

== P ==
- Frederik Paulsen Sr (1909–1997), physician; founder of Ferring Pharmaceuticals
- Tjede Peckes (1500–1517), female Wurster Frisian military flag bearer who was slain in the Battle of the Wremer Djip.
- Sam Peckinpah, American film director and screenwriter
- Matthias Petersen (1632–1706), whaling captain from Föhr; in his lifetime he caught 373 whales
- Wolfgang Petersen, German movie director (Das Boot)
- David Petraeus, former four-star general in the United States Army, former Director of the Central Intelligence Agency; his father was a sea captain from Franeker, Netherlands
- Alvin Plantinga, American philosopher of Frisian descent
- Gerriet Postma (1932–2009), Dutch painter

== R ==
- Hendrik van Rijgersma (1835–1877), physician and amateur botanist, malacologist and ichthyologist
- Rintje Ritsma, former Dutch long track speed skater

== S ==
- Fedde Schurer (1898 – 1968), Dutch poet, politician.
- Menno Simons (1496 – January 31, 1561), Anabaptist religious leader from Friesland whose followers became known as Mennonites
- Kyrsten Sinema (born 1976), American politician and former social worker; U.S. Senator from Arizona
- Friede Springer (born 1942), widow of publisher Axel Springer; major shareholder of Axel Springer AG
- Theodor Storm (1817–1888), wrote Der Schimmelreiter
- Peter Stuyvesant (1612–1672), last Dutch Director-General of the colony of New Netherland (New York)

== V ==
- Simon Vestdijk (1899–1971), novelist, musician, psychological analyst
- Wigerus Vitringa (1657–1725), Dutch painter
- Jouke de Vries, Dutch PVDA politician

== W ==
- Otto Waalkes, German comedian, actor and musician, born in Emden
- Hayley Westenra, singer from New Zealand; of some Frisian descent
- Harm Wiersma (born 1953 in Leeuwarden), six time world champion in draughts and politician
- Piter Wilkens (born 1959), Frisian folk and pop singer

== Z ==
- Jelle Zijlstra (1918–2001), Prime Minister of the Netherlands 1966–67
- Wout Zijlstra, strongest man of the Netherlands in 2001; third of the world in 1998
- Epke Zonderland, gymnast, Olympic champion (2012)

== See also ==
- List of Dutch people
- List of people from Amsterdam
