= Talking Gravestones of Föhr =

Historic artifacts on the German island of Föhr

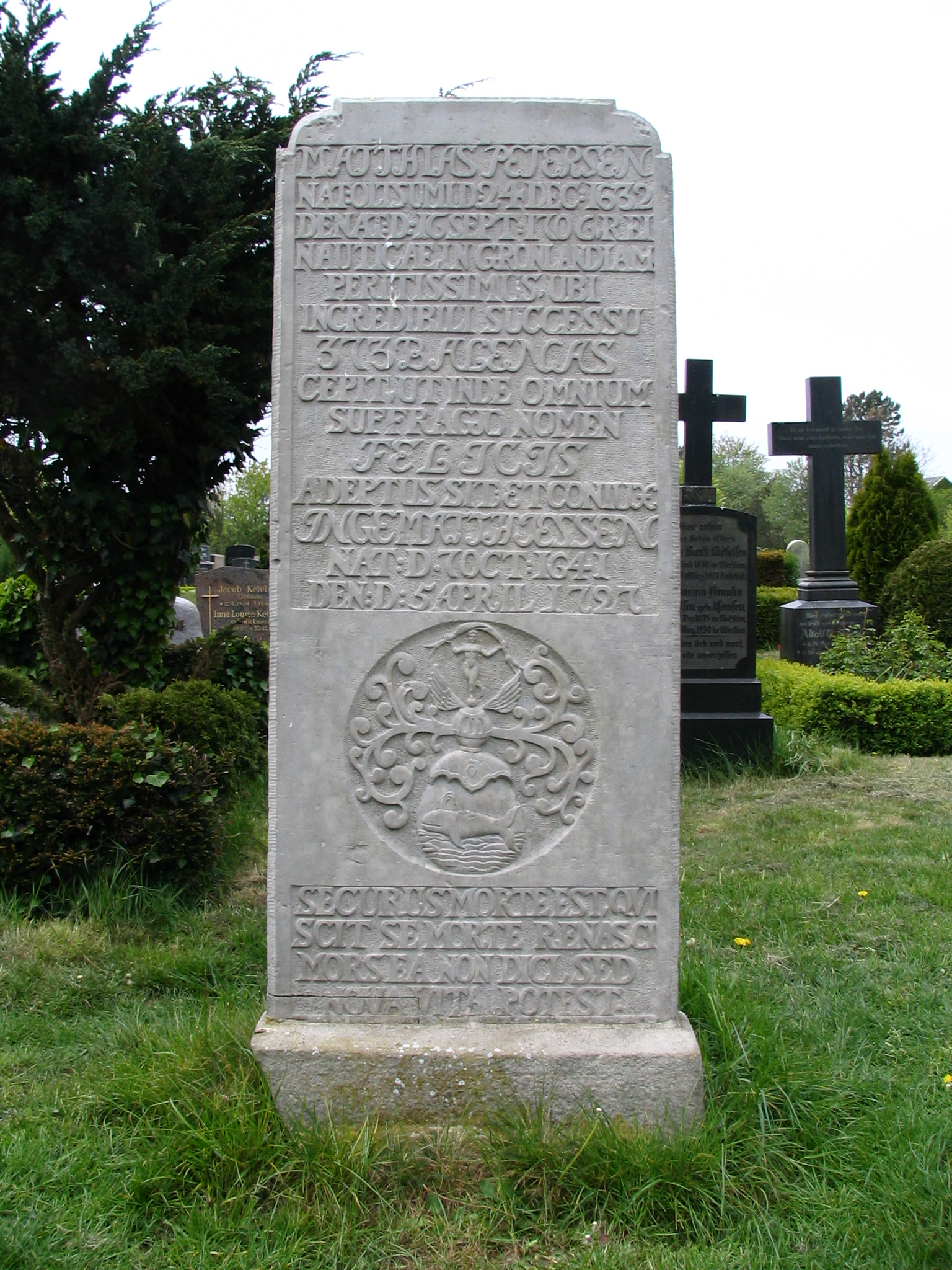
The tomb of "Lucky Matthew" in the cemetery of Süderende

The Talking Gravestones (German: Sprechende Grabsteine) of Föhr, also known as the Story-telling Gravestones (Erzählende Grabsteine), are historic artifacts on the German island of Föhr. They can be found in the cemeteries of St. Laurentii church in Süderende (54.7163°N 8.4352°E), St. Johannes church in Nieblum (54.6934°N 8.4911°E), and St. Nikolai church in Boldixum (54.6958°N 8.5504°E), which is now a district of Wyk auf Föhr. Similar objects are known from the neighbour island of Amrum. All such headstones made until 1870 are designated cultural heritage monuments. Their inscriptions tell the biographies of the deceased including their private and professional lives, extraordinary events, and honorary appointments. With 265 monuments, the St. Johannis cemetery has the largest inventory of historical gravestones in Nordfriesland district. The best-known tombstone is the one of Matthias Petersen who was a very successful whaling captain and was therefore dubbed "Lucky Matthew" (der glückliche Matthias). The only ornamental decoration on this stone is a circular relief depicting the goddess of fortune upon a swimming whale in the style of a coat of arms. It features the only inscription completely in Latin language in the cemetery of Süderende, which relates that Petersen who died in 1706 caught 373 whales during his lifetime.

== Origin of the material ==
The oldest Talking Gravestones were made from slabs of red sandstone that originated from the Solling hills in northern Westphalia. Later tombstones measure roughly 160 by 70 centimetres (63 by 28 in). Most gravestones were made from sandstone quarried in Obernkirchen, Lower Saxony. Shipmasters used to take the stones on board as ballast. Only wealthy people from Föhr could afford totally new monuments while poor persons would have to grind off old slabs to add a new design. Sometimes also test objects from a stonemason's workshop may have been erected in the cemetery. This theory is supported by specific letters and the word ALVABET on the backside of one headstone.

== Stonemasons ==
Apart from a few great tomb plates that were likely created by foreign, professional stonemasons, all Talking Gravestones were made locally by the island population. At first it may have been Dutch wood carvers from the mainland that were hired to decorate the gravestones, until ship carpenters had obtained the skills of stonemasonry and got orders from the neighbouring islands and Föhr proper to create gravestones. The design of the decorations is sometimes very intricate, so that the process of creation took a long time. As a result, many gravestones could only be erected several years after the burial of the deceased person.

== Language and symbolism ==
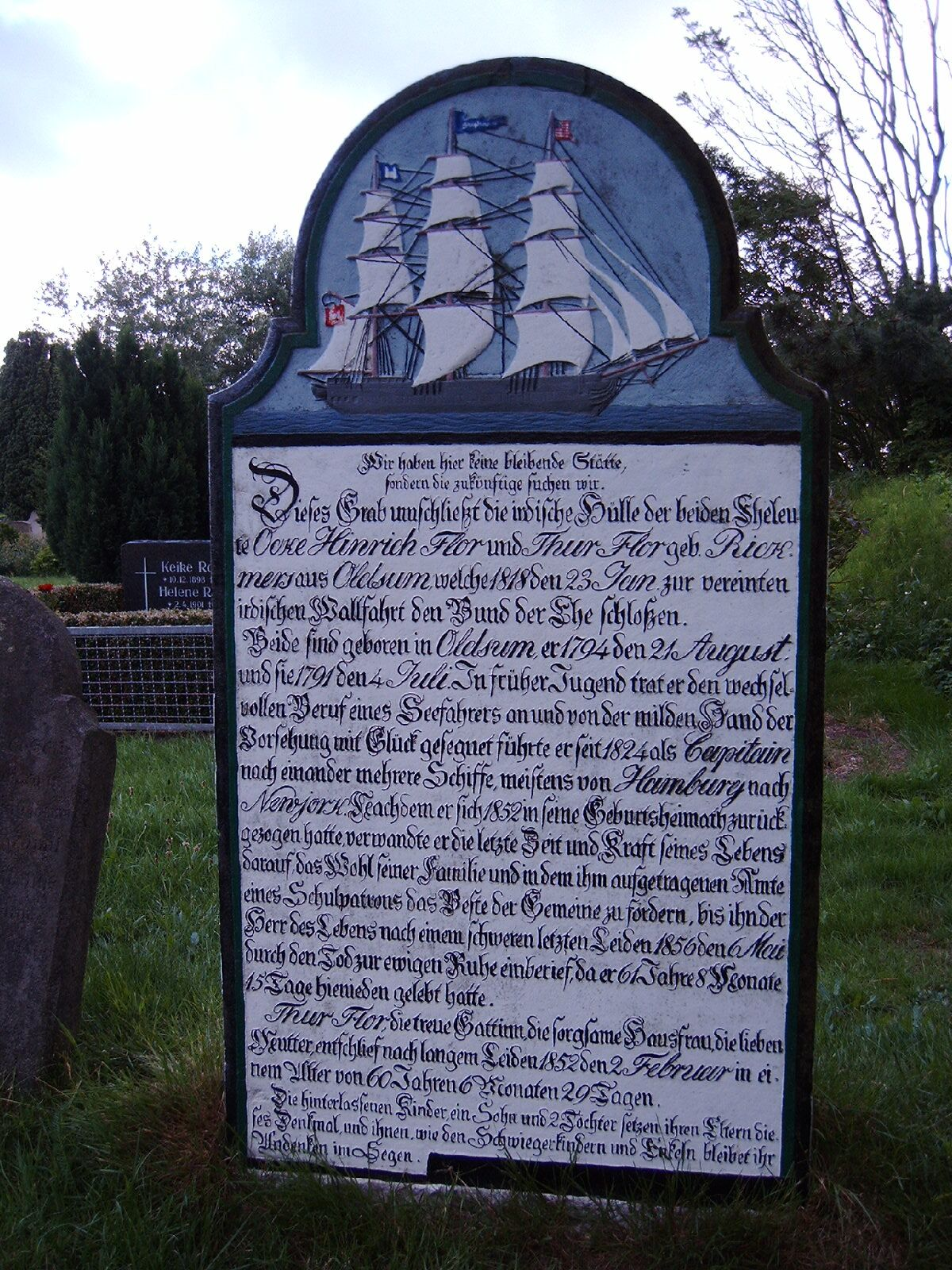
The tombstone of a husband and wife in the cemetery of Süderende

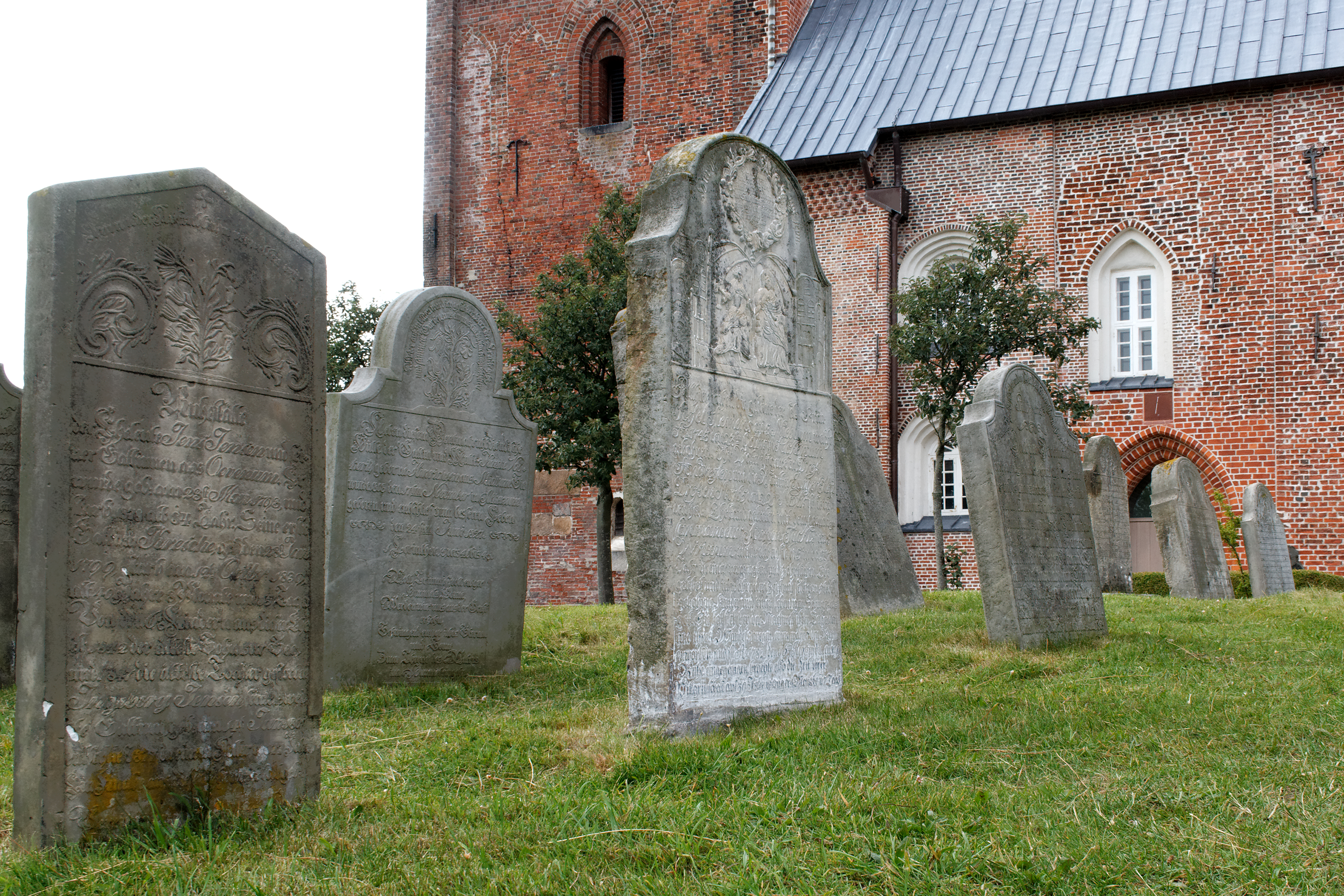
The cemetery of Nieblum

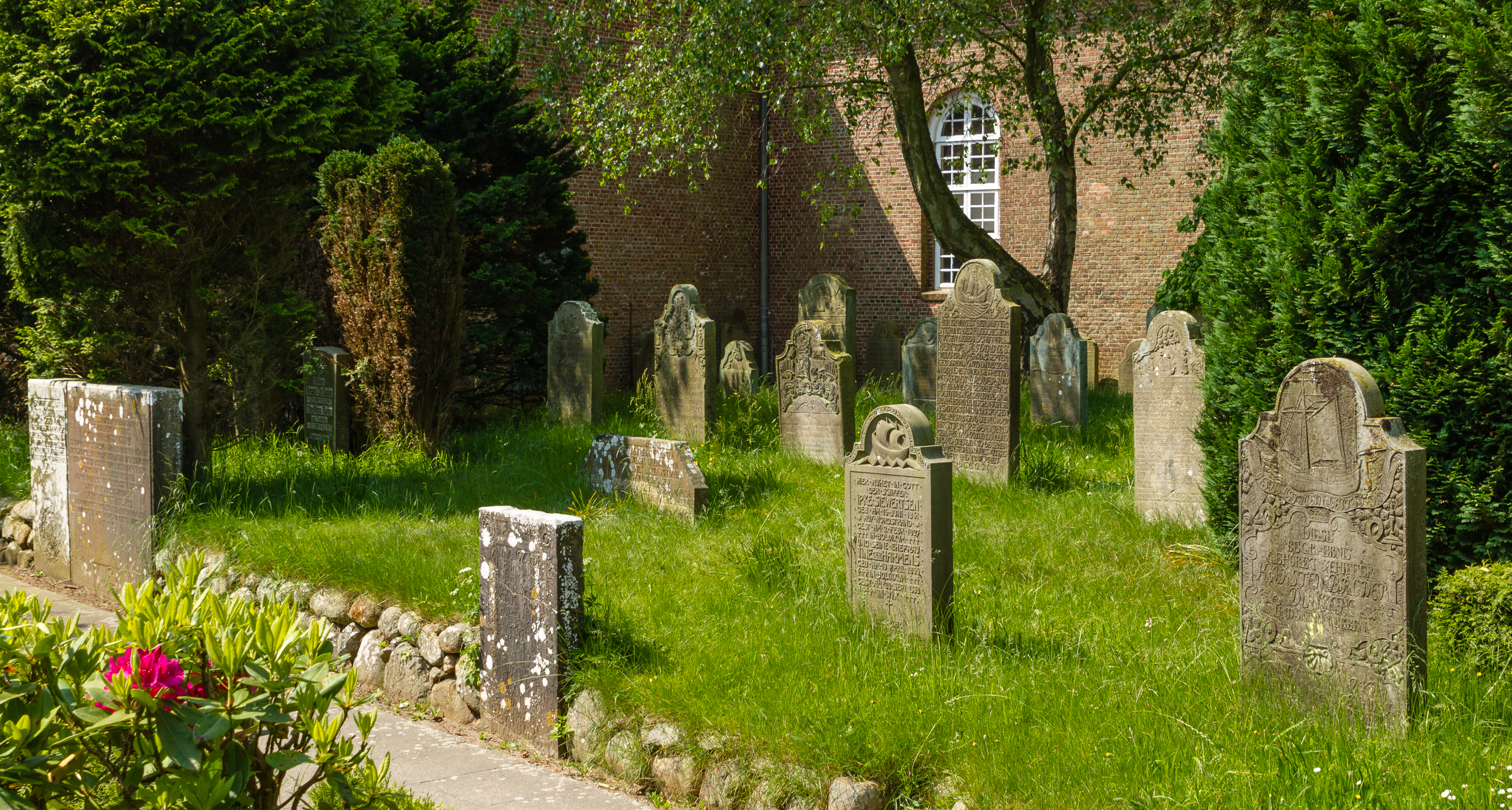
The cemetery of Boldixum

The texts on most gravestones are exclusively written in the "noble" church language of Standard German (Hochdeutsch) although the island then used to belong to Denmark and the everyday-language was Fering, a local dialect of the North Frisian language which is still spoken today. A few stones exhibit texts in Low German which used to be the official and ecclesiastical language until around 1700, while other texts are written in Latin. Some 20th-century tombstones have inscriptions in Fering. In order to tell the long biographies on the limited space of the stone slab, the stonemasons sometimes used abbreviations:

- J.S.G.G.S. = Ihren Seelen Gott gnädig sei [May God have mercy upon their souls]
- D.S.G.G.S. = Deren Seelen Gott gnädig sei [On whose souls God may have mercy]
- I.S.S.G.G. = Ihrer Seele sei Gott gnädig [On whose soul God may have mercy]
- D.S.G.G.I. = Deren Seelen Gott gnädig ist [On whose souls God has mercy]
- G.S.S.S.G. = Gott sei seiner Seele gnädig [May God have mercy upon his soul].

The relief decorations are kept in baroque and rococo style. They are often detailed and fantastic with unique forms that are not repeated. The images may show "angels as symbols of justice, happiness, and a sign of faith, love and hope, but also ships, windmills and the family tree are shown". Scenes from the Bible are often the main motive of the ornaments on a stone. When a seafarer died on his ship, the ship is depicted with full sails while unrigged ships mean that the sailor died on land. Other popular motives are items from the deceased person's daily trade but also Lady Justice.

A special iconographic tradition can be found in the floral motives: the husband and the sons of a family are depicted on the left-hand side of the image as tulip-like flowers whereas the wife and daughters are shown on the right-hand side as star-shaped flowers with four petals. A broken stalk is a sign that the respective person was already dead when the tombstone was created. The frequency of broken flowers attests a high rate of infant mortality.

== History ==
The oldest gravestones were made of sandstone slabs. To put them up in a slanted position, a hole was drilled through the stone so a wooden staff or a whale bone could support the stone. In later times, largers stones became popular that were called 'Bremen stones' according to their origin. The oldest Talking Gravestone dates back to the year 1605. After 1700, the income of the population increased rapidly. because from the 17th to the 19th century, seafarers from Föhr including a number of captains pursued whaling and merchant shipping. In these times, upright tombstones were used more often. Steles were introduced in the 18th century. When they were erected, they were mostly decorated with a coloured ornament on top, the section below would relate the biography of the deceased, and at the bottom would often be a Biblical verse or another image. When old stones were grinded off, the original top decoration often remained intact.

The early 19th century marked the decline of this type of gravestones. Classicist monuments became increasingly popular which refrained from displaying images and extended biographies. In the mid-19th century, this special form of burial culture had become totally uncommon. Nowadays, polished slabs of granite that only display the name and vital statistics of the deceased are usually found on Föhr and other North Frisian islands.

== See also ==
- Talking Gravestones of Amrum
