= Henry Sloman =

Henry Sloman may refer to:

- Henry Brarens Sloman (1848–1931), businessman and banker
- Henry Stanhope Sloman (1861–1945), British Army officer
