= Sloman =

Sloman is a surname, and may refer to:

- Aaron Sloman, UK academic and artificial intelligence researcher
- Albert Sloman, UK vice chancellor, University of Essex, 1963–1987
- Anthony Sloman, English film critic
- Bob Sloman, English 1920s rugby league footballer
- Charles Sloman, English comic entertainer and songwriter in the mid-19th century
- Edward Sloman, English silent film director and actor
- Henry Brarens Sloman, English-German entrepreneur
- Henry Stanhope Sloman, British Army officer
- John Sloman, Welsh vocalist, with Uriah Heep
- Robert Sloman (1926–2005), English screenwriter and actor
- Robert Miles Sloman, English-German shipbuilder and shipowner
- Roger Sloman, English actor
- Sam Sloman (born 1997), American football player
