= Sluman =

Sluman is a surname. Notable people with the surname include:

- Jeff Sluman (born 1957), American golfer
- Ken Sluman (1924–1991), Canadian football player
- Lloyd Sluman (born 1952), English cricketer

== See also ==
- Luman (name)
- Sloman
