= Süderende =

Süderende Söleraanj / Syderende
- Municipality
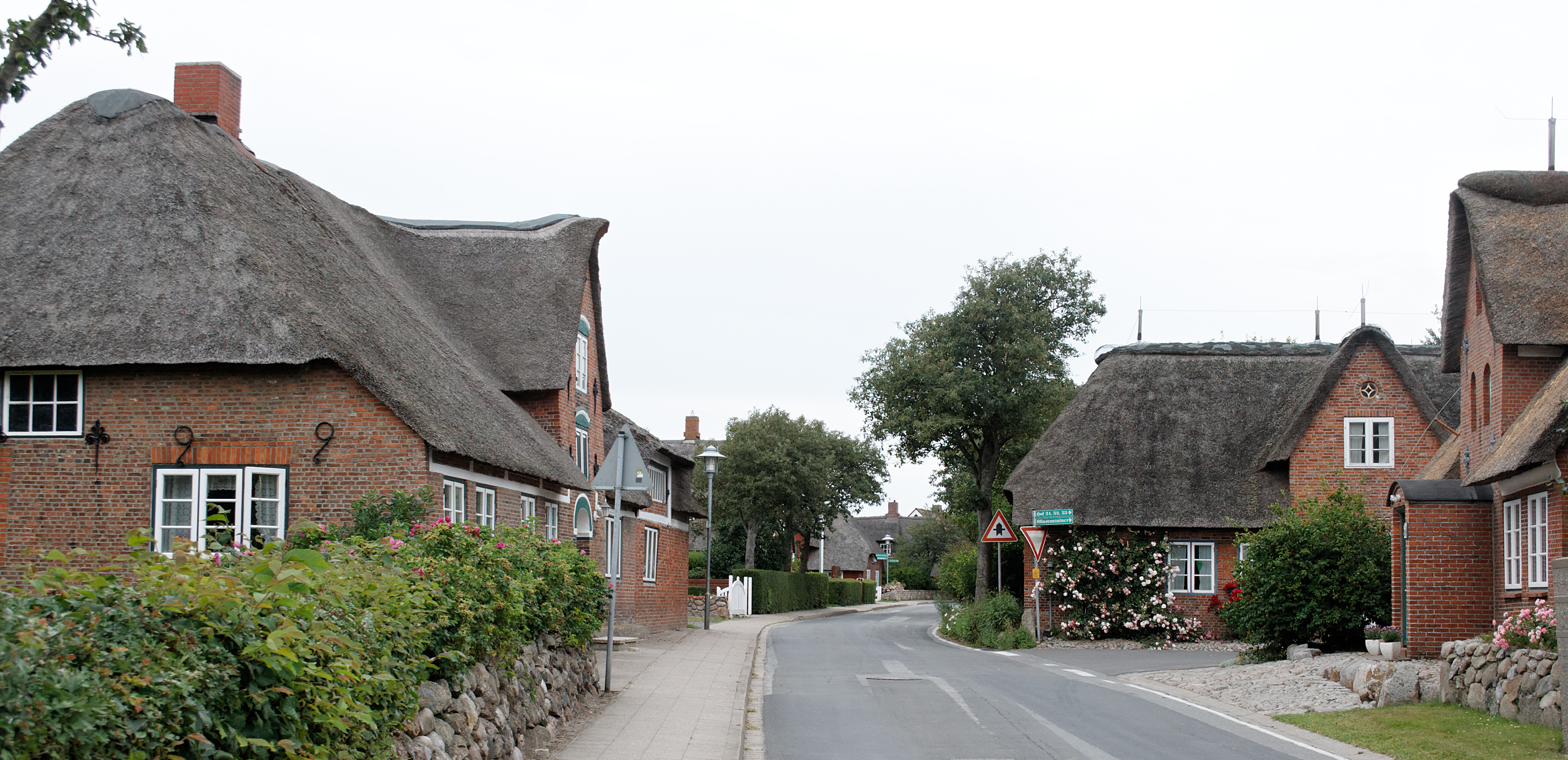
- Süderende's main road

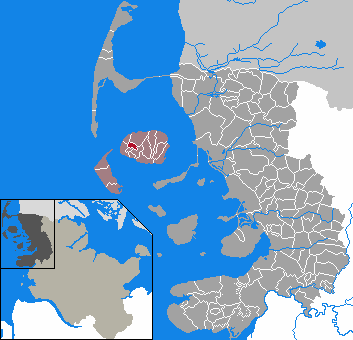
- Location of Süderende; Söleraanj / Syderende within Nordfriesland district
- Interactive map of Süderende; Söleraanj / Syderende
- Location within Germany Location within Schleswig-Holstein
- Coordinates: 54°43′34″N 8°26′28″E
- Country: Germany
- State: Schleswig-Holstein
- District: Nordfriesland
- Municipal assoc.: Föhr-Amrum

Government
  - Mayor: Christian Roeloffs

Area
  - Total: 2.59 km^{2} (1.00 sq mi)
- Elevation: 5 m (16 ft)

Population (2025-12-31)
  - Total: 186
  - Density: 71.8/km^{2} (186/sq mi)
- Time zone: UTC+01:00 (CET)
  - Summer (DST): UTC+02:00 (CEST)
- Postal codes: 25938
- Dialling codes: 04683
- Vehicle registration: NF
- Website: www.suederende-foehr.de

Süderende (Fering: Söleraanj, Danish: Syderende) is a municipality on the island of Föhr in the district of Nordfriesland, in Schleswig-Holstein, Germany.

== History ==
Historical population
Year	Pop.	±%
1667	52	—
1678	65	+25.0%
1689	76	+16.9%
1700	86	+13.2%
1711	100	+16.3%
1722	108	+8.0%
1787	122	+13.0%
1801	136	+11.5%
1834	168	+23.5%
1860	146	−13.1%
1880	133	−8.9%
1900	167	+25.6%
1939	162	−3.0%
1961	160	−1.2%
1982	154	−3.7%
2016	182	+18.2%

The place used to belong to Oldsum, being its southern edge. After Denmark's loss of Schleswig to Prussia in 1864 and the subsequent municipal reformation when Prussia eventually annexed Schleswig-Holstein in 1867, Süderende became independent.

In the 17th century a private navigation school was established in Süderende by pastor Richardus Petri which was the first of its kind on the island. It improved the situation of the seafaring population considerably and soon other navigators opened own schools across Föhr. Although Petri lead the Süderende school successfully for many years he never sailed to sea himself. A census in 1787 showed that Süderende had 122 inhabitants, 27 of whom were seafarers.

== Language ==
The common language among the locals is Fering. The language is being kept alive by being passed on to the next generation by many of the inhabitants.

== Education ==
Süderende has got the elementary school for western Föhr, which also hosts the lutheran kindergarten of the St. Laurentii parish.

== Sights ==
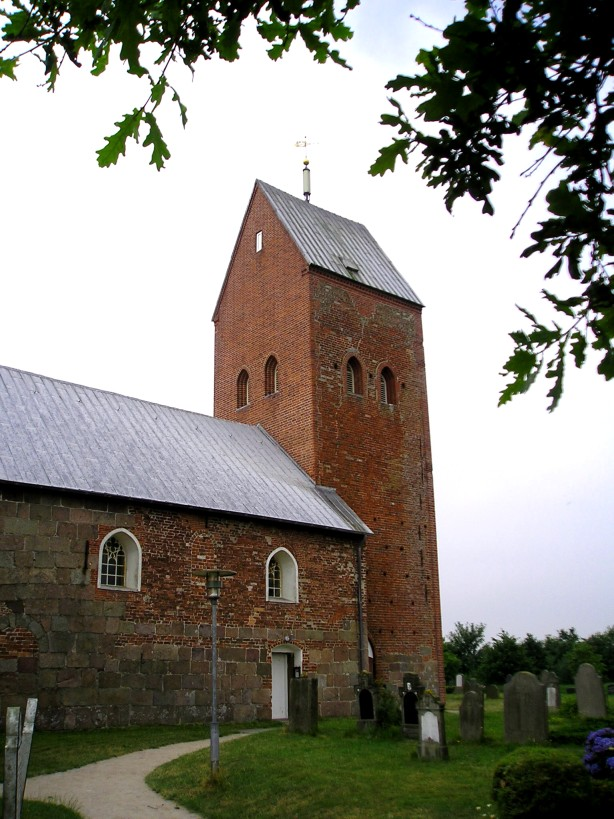
The church of St. Lawrence

On the southern edge of the village the church of St. Lawrence is located, originally a roman style construction from the 12th century made of stone, which was later extended using bricks. These bricks dominate today's view of the church. In the 1990s, Renaissance paintings were uncovered on the church's ceiling. In the ample graveyard the tombs of Matthias Petersen and Oluf Braren can be seen among others.

== Politics ==
Since the communal elections of 2008, the Süderender Wählergemeinschaft holds six out of seven seats in the council. The seventh seat is held by a single candidate.
