= Henry Brarens Sloman =

- Born: 26 August 1848; Kingston upon Hull, England
- Died: 24 October 1931 (aged 83); Hamburg, Germany
- Occupation(s): Saltpetre merchant, banker
- Relatives: Robert Miles Sloman, granduncle; Hinrich Braren, great-granduncle

Henry Brarens Sloman (28 August 1848 – 24 October 1931) was a businessman and banker based in Hamburg, Germany. Around the First World War, he was considered a remarkable importer of saltpetre from his own mines in Chile, and was listed as the richest person in Hamburg.

== Life ==
Henry B. Sloman was born in Kingston upon Hull, England, on 28 August 1848 to John and Alaine Sloman. His granduncle Robert Miles Sloman was a shipbuilder and ship owner in Hamburg. When his father had lost all his assets in the Crimean War, he sent Henry and his sister Harriet to wealthy relatives in Hamburg. After absolving an apprenticeship as a locksmith in Hamburg, Henry was encouraged by his friend Hermann Fölsch to emigrate to Chile, with Fölsch's father loaning the journey's costs to Sloman. It was also Hermann Fölsch who arranged for Sloman getting work in Iquique where he later acted as director of the Fölsch & Martin company. After 22 years of working for Fölsch & Martin, Sloman established his own saltpetre business in Tocopilla and returned to Hamburg in 1889 as a wealthy man. In 1912, Sloman was recorded as leading a list of the richest citizens of Hamburg with a net worth of Goldmark 60 million and an annual income of 3 million. In 1924, he founded the bank Finanzbank AG which developed into Sloman Bank KG. In 1976, it was merged with Bankhaus Hardy & Co. GmbH to become Hardy-Sloman Bank GmbH. In 1981, the latter was absorbed by Deutsche Länderbank which is now a part of UBS Germany.

In 1922, Sloman commissioned the Chilehaus (Chile House), a ten-story office building in Hamburg that is notable for its architecture.

Henry Sloman died on 24 October 1931 in Hamburg.

=== Personal life ===
Henry B. Sloman married Renata Hilliger on 5 February 1881 with whom he had four children: Adelaida (1881–1901), Enrique Juan, Ricardo Federico (1885–1983), and Alfred Herbert (1887–1935).
