= Arfst F. Frudden =

Lumberman and politician in Iowa

Arfst Frederich Frudden

Member of the Iowa Senate from the 35th district
- In office 1907 – 1911
- Succeeded by: N. J. Schrup

Member of the Iowa House of Representatives from the 69th district
- In office 1902 – 1906

Personal details
- Born: September 10, 1854 Toftum, Föhr, Denmark (now Germany)
- Died: April 8, 1931 (aged 76) Beverly Hills, California, United States
- Party: Democratic
- Profession: Lumberman

Arfst Frederich Frudden (1854-1931) was a German-American politician and businessman from Föhr. Emigrating to Iowa in the 1870s, he co-founded a lumber company in 1888. He advocated for lumbermen in several trade organizations, then was nominated by the Democrats to serve in the Iowa House of Representatives and later the Iowa Senate.

== Biography ==
Arfst Frederich Frudden was born in Toftum, Föhr, Denmark (later Germany) to Cornelius F. and Elke (Namens) Frudden on September 10, 1854. In 1871, following the Franco-Prussian War, he emigrated to the United States, ending in Clinton, Iowa. He worked on his cousin's farm near Sabula, Iowa for a year and a half. Some acquaintances that Frudden met during his emigration offered to give him a warehousing job in Clinton with Curtis Brothers & Company.

In 1880, Frudden joined W. W. Carr & Company in Dubuque, Iowa. The next year, he rejoined Curtis Brothers as the foreman of their factory in Wausau, Wisconsin, staying there for three years. Frudden returned again to Dubuque and again worked for his previous employer there, now known as Carr, Ryder & Wheeler. By 1888, Frudden had saved enough to found his own company with his two sons and brother, the Frudden Lumber Company. Reorganized in 1894 as the Rumpf-Frudden Lumber Company, it grew to handle over 20 million feet of lumber per year.

Frudden was active in trade organizations, rising to lead the Northwestern Lumberman's Association and Central Iowa Association in 1897. The next year, he rose to the presidency of the Eastern Iowa Association. In 1901, the Iowa Democratic Party nominated him to serve in the Iowa House of Representatives. He served there for three two-year terms, then was elected to the Iowa Senate, where he served until 1911.

Frudden remained in Dubuque until 1919, when he retired to California. He married Philine Johannsen on November 30, 1877, and had seven children. He was a Shriner and 32nd degree Mason. He died in Beverly Hills, California, on April 8, 1931, and was buried in Linwood Cemetery, Dubuque.
