= Oldsum =

Oldsum Olersem (North Frisian)
- Municipality
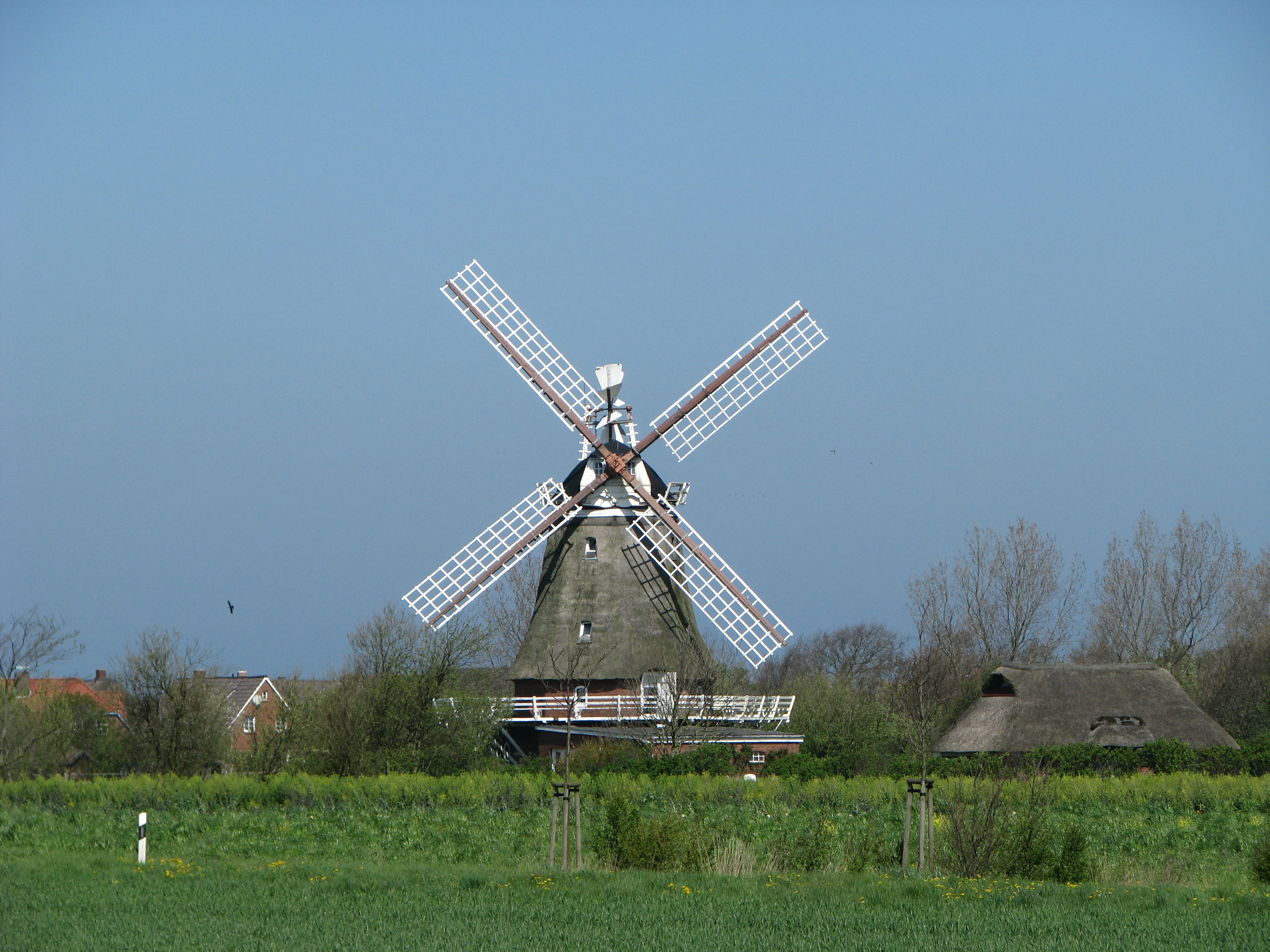
- The windmill is Oldsum's landmark

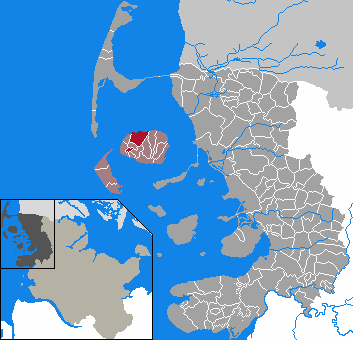
- Location of Oldsum; Olersem (North Frisian) within Nordfriesland district
- Interactive map of Oldsum; Olersem (North Frisian)
- Location within Germany Location within Schleswig-Holstein
- Coordinates: 54°44′N 8°27′E
- Country: Germany
- State: Schleswig-Holstein
- District: Nordfriesland
- Municipal assoc.: Föhr-Amrum

Government
  - Mayor: Hark Riewerts

Area
  - Total: 13.3 km^{2} (5.1 sq mi)
- Elevation: 4 m (13 ft)

Population (2025-12-31)
  - Total: 553
  - Density: 41.6/km^{2} (108/sq mi)
- Time zone: UTC+01:00 (CET)
  - Summer (DST): UTC+02:00 (CEST)
- Postal codes: 25938
- Dialling codes: 04683
- Vehicle registration: NF
- Website: www.oldsum-auf-foehr.de

Oldsum (Fering: Olersem) is a municipality on the island of Föhr, in the district of Nordfriesland, in Schleswig-Holstein, Germany.

== Geography ==
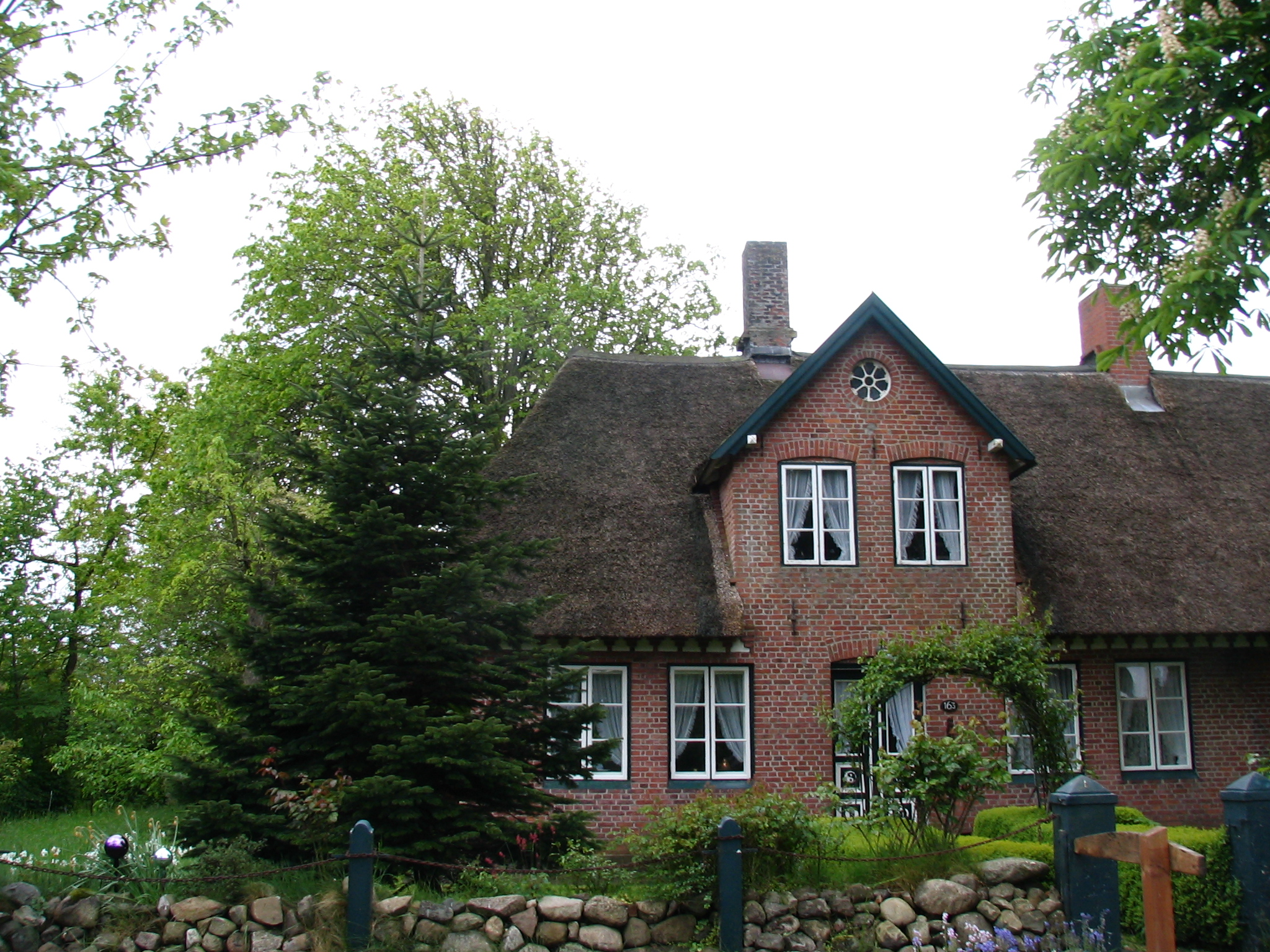
A typical thatched house in Oldsum

The municipality of Oldsum consists of the three hamlets of Oldsum, Klintum (Fering: Klantem) and Toftum (Fering: Taftem) which are spread over some two kilometres along a main road. The population number about 600. The landscape is marked by well-preserved thatched farmhouses. Oldsum's landmark is an ancient thatched windmill whose antecessor presumably dates back to the year 1700. Though burned down 200 years later, it was rebuilt and subsequently was in use until 1954. Since 1972 the mill is exclusively used as a dwelling house. Oldsum is situated approximately two kilometres from the western shore of the island, the northern coastline is a little closer. Oldsum adjoins Süderende to the south, Dunsum to the southwest and Alkersum and Midlum to the east.

== History ==
Historical population
Year	Pop.	±%
1667	572	—
1678	633	+10.7%
1689	672	+6.2%
1700	708	+5.4%
1711	764	+7.9%
1722	839	+9.8%
1787	981	+16.9%
1801	918	−6.4%
1834	764	−16.8%
1860	809	+5.9%
1880	541	−33.1%
1900	714	+32.0%
1939	577	−19.2%
1961	528	−8.5%
1982	514	−2.7%
2016	508	−1.2%

Oldsum was first recorded in 1462 as Uluersum. During the 17th and 18th centuries, Oldsum, Klintum and Toftum were important whaling villages. A census in 1787 showed that a total of 211 of the inhabitants of the three places were seafarers. One of the most successful whalers, Matthias Petersen (1632–1706) lived in Oldsum proper. In his lifetime he was able to catch 373 whales, his tomb can still be visited in the graveyard of the St. Laurentii church in Süderende.

As a part of Westerland Föhr, Oldsum belonged to the Royal Enclaves of Denmark and thus was a direct part of the Danish crown while Osterland Föhr belonged to the Duchy of Schleswig. Only when Denmark lost Schleswig to Prussia in the Second Schleswig War, Oldsum became a part of Schleswig-Holstein.

== Politics ==
Since the communal elections of 2008, the Oldsumer Wählergemeinschaft holds eight seats out of nine in the municipality's council. The ninth seat is held by an independent contestant.

== Economy ==
With the rise of tourism, agriculture began to decrease in significance. Today there are only a few scattered farmsteads. Some farms were evacuated out of the town in the 1950s and 60's and are now situated outside the village proper but still in the municipality's area. Oldsum underwent a transformation from a farmers' to an artists' village, numerous studios and galleries can now be found there. Other important economical factors are a rising number of crafts enterprises as well as retailing.

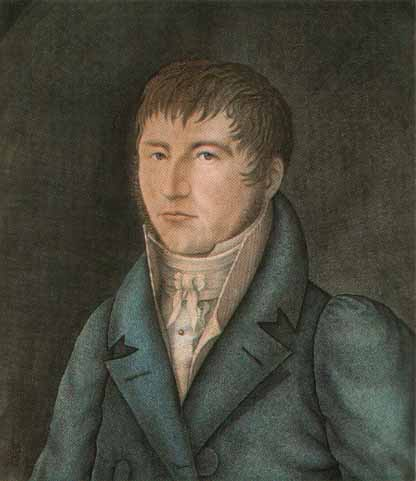
Oluf Braren

== Notable people ==
- Matthias Petersen (1632–1706), whaling captain, called "Lucky"
- Hinrich Braren (1751–1826), nautical examiner who wrote the first nautical textbook in German language
- Oluf Braren (1787–1839), painter
- Arfst F. Frudden (1854-1931), a German-American politician and businessman
- Friede Springer (born 1942) publisher and widow of Axel Springer and major shareholder of Axel Springer AG
