= Talking Gravestones of Amrum =

Historical artifacts in the St. Clemens Church cemetery, Nebel, Amrum

Coordinates: 54.6530°N 8.3555°E

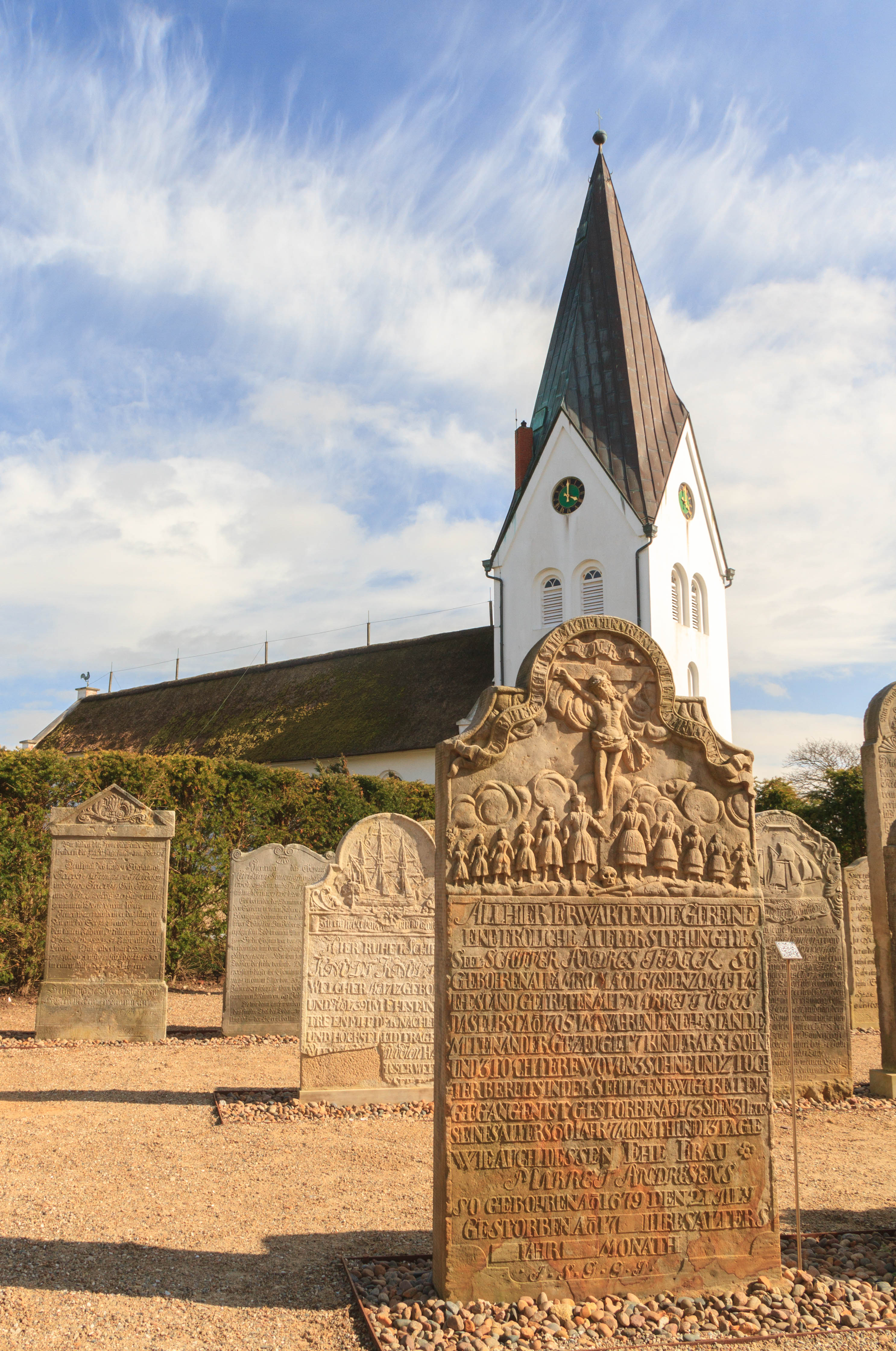
Talking Gravestones at St. Clemens Church, in Nebel on Amrum Island, Germany

The Talking Gravestones of Amrum (German: Sprechende Grabsteine), also known as the Story-telling Gravestones (Erzählende Grabsteine), are historic artifacts on the German island of Amrum, one of the North Frisian Islands off the west coast of the Jutland Peninsula. They stand in a legally protected section of the St. Clemens Church cemetery in the village of Nebel. The gravestones, totaling 152, are inscribed with sometimes detailed accounts of the occupations, life histories, social rank and families of the deceased. The best-known gravestone is for Hark Olufs, an early 18th-century seafarer and folk hero. Similar objects can be found at the neighbouring island Föhr.

The gravestones, most made of sandstone by local stonemasons, date from 1678 to 1858. Their inscriptions reflect the historic culture of the times and the whaling industry that then occupied many Frisian Islanders. The largest are 2 meters (6.7 feet) tall and weigh about 800 kilograms (1,800 lb).

== Stonemasons ==
Except for a few large monuments that were created by professional stonemasons from elsewhere, the gravestones were carved by local craftsmen and ship's carpenters. They included Tai Hirichs (1718–1759) from the coastal islet Nordstrandischmoor, Jens Payen (1711–1787) and Arfst Hanken (1735–1826) from the neighboring island Föhr, as well as the Amrum resident Jan Peters (1768–1855), who crafted 36 of the still intact gravestones. Hinrichs created the most widely known markers, those of Oluf Jensen and his son Hark Olufs. Although these craftsmen were not trained stonemasons, the quality of their work is considered above average.

== Language and symbolism ==
Most of the inscriptions are engraved but some are raised above the surface. Various styles of writing are employed. The oldest examples are written primarily in the High German (Hochdeutsch) employed in religious services, even though Amrum belonged for centuries to Denmark.

The inscriptions include detailed information about the origins of the deceased, dates of birth and death, marriage and number of children. Many include detailed information about the subjects' lives, and some are so long that the reverse side of the gravestone had to be used for the complete story.

The gravestone of Hark Olufs, to cite a key example, says on its front side: (Note: Hier liegt der grosse Krieger-Held. Ruhe sanft auf Amrom Christen Feld. Als seeliger Harck Olufs, so daselbst gebohren auf Amrum Anno 1708 den 19. Julii. Bald darauf in sein jungen Jahren von den türckischen Seeräubern zu Algier ist er A[nn]o 1724 d[en] 24. Martii gefangen genommen worden. In solcher Gefangenschaft aber hat er dem türkischen Bey zu Constantin als Casnadaje 11 und ein virtel Jahr gedinet, bis ihm endlich dieser Bey A[nn]o 1735 d[en] 31. October aus Gewogenheit zu ihm seine Freyheit geschencket, da er denn das folgende Jahr darauf als A[nn]o 1736 d[en] 25. April glücklich wiederum alhier auff seinem Vaterland angelanget ist, und sich also A[nn]o 1737 in dem Stande der heiligen Ehe begeben mit Antje Harken, so nun sich nebst 5 Kindern in den betrübten Wittwestande befindet. In solcher Ehe haben sie aber einen Sohn und 4 Töchtern gezeugt. So mit ihr alle den Tod ihres Vaters fühlen müssen, da er gestorben ist A[nn]o 1754 d[en] 13. October, und sein Leben gebracht auf 46 Jahr und 13 Wochen.)

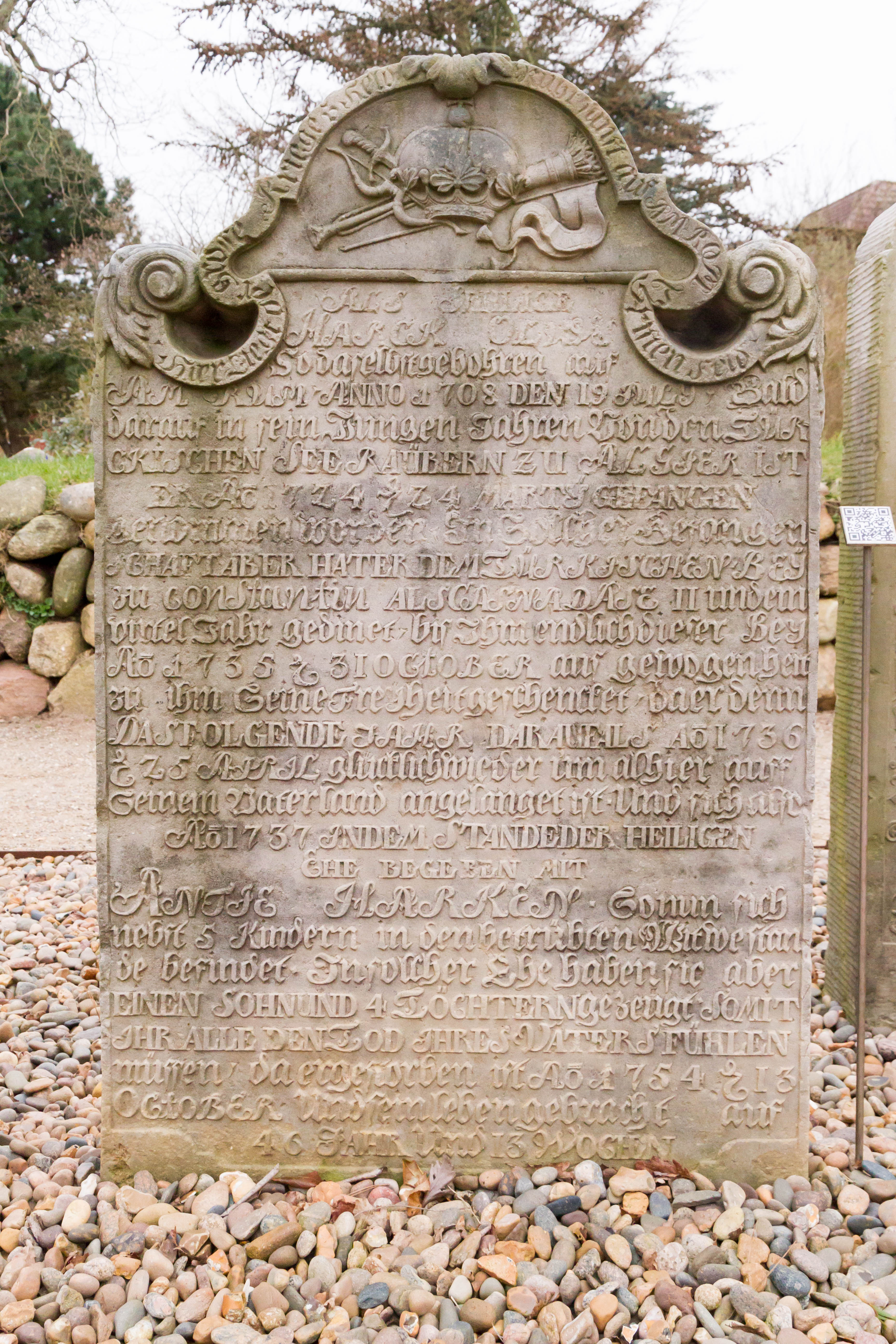
Gravestone of Hark Olufs – front side

Here lies the great war hero, may he rest in peace in Amrum's Christian ground.

Blessedly, Harck Olufs was born on Amrom on July 19 in the year 1708. While still in his youth he was captured by Turkish pirates from Algiers on 24 March 1724. He was enslaved and served the Turkish bey in Constantine as Casnadaye, for eleven and one-fourth years, until the bey, out of consideration for his work, granted him freedom. On 25 April in the year 1736 he reached his fatherland again. The following year was united in holy matrimony with Antje Harken, and they had five children, one son and four daughters. All survived the death of their father on 13 October in the year 1754, after 46 years and 13 weeks of life.

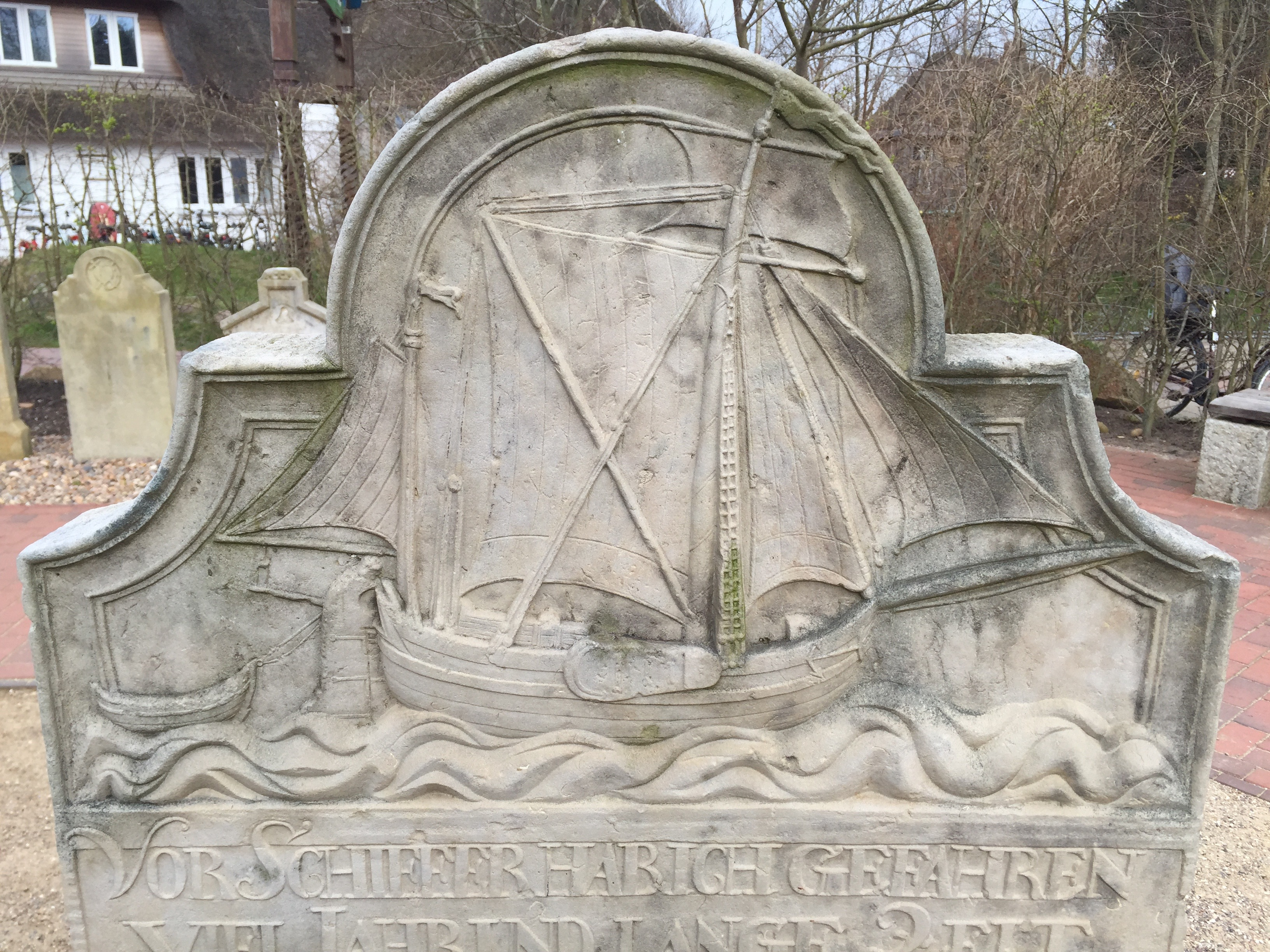
Various types of ships are depicted.

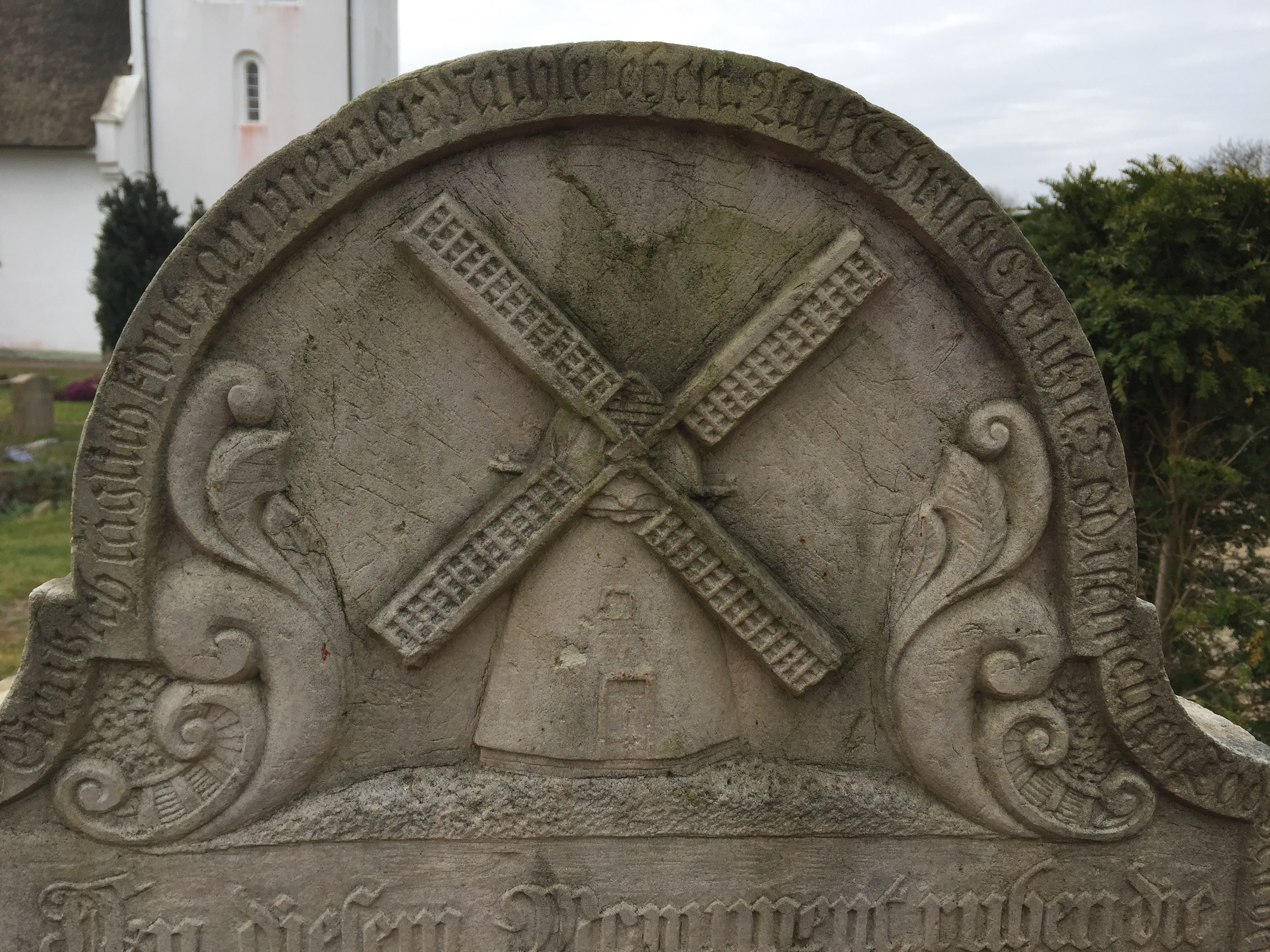
Gravestone of miller Erk Knudten

The inscription continues on the reverse side: (Note: Gott gebe dem Leibe eine fröliche Auferstehung am jüngsten Tage. An den Meinigen ruff ich aus dem Grabe noch diese Zeilen zum Andencken zurück: Ach leider: In meinen jungen Jahren Müst ich zum Raub der Algierer fahren Und halten fast zwölff Jahr die Slaverey. Doch machte Gott durch seine Hand mich frey. Darüm sage ich noch einmal: Ich weis, mein Gott, ich muß nun sterben. Ich will, eins aber bitt ich aus. Las doch die Meinigen nicht verderben. Bewahre du das Witwenhaus. Ach Gott, weil ich nicht sorgen kan, so nim dich Frau und Kinder an.)

"May God grant him a joyful resurrection on the earliest day." From the grave I speak the following lines of remembrance: Unfortunately, in my young years I had to yield myself to the Algerians and undergo almost 12 years of slavery. But God with his mighty hand set me free. Therefore I say once again, I know my God that I must die. But do not consider my faults. Protect thou the widow's home and, oh God, because I cannot care for them, take the wife and children under your care.

The largest gravestones formerly stood on the graves of Amrumers who took part in the lucrative whaling expeditions to Greenland. Other artistically carved stones marked the graves of members of the upper class and other prosperous families. Each engraved letter cost about 3 gold marks, while an average man earned only about 10 gold marks a year. However, in a good season a whaling ship's captain could bring home around 900 marks. The graves of poor people usually were marked by only a red sandstone slab with dates of birth and death or with a simple wooden cross.

Many gravestones are decorated with depictions of ships. Typical vessels represented include fishing smacks, galiots, tjalks, koffs, brigs, barques, whalers and armed cargo ships (Handelsfregatten). However, these ship carvings did not necessarily mean the deceased was a sailor; rather, they symbolized the voyage of life or, when anchored in a harbor, the end of life's journey. Other designs include a Dutch windmill on the gravestone of the seafarer and later miller Erk Knudten (1733–1801), and a man in a Sunday suit on the marker of the church sacristan Hark Knudten. Flowers on gravestones are thought to represent a full life, although broken stalks denote relatives of the deceased that had died earlier.

== History ==
The first of Amrum's gravestones were finished in the last decades of the 17th century. During this period, the standard of living on Amrum began to increase rapidly due to the proceeds of whaling. But economic conditions began to decline in the early 19th century, so there are fewer "talking gravestones" from then on.

After the Second Schleswig War in 1864 Amrum was briefly ruled cooperatively by Prussia and Austria, but after the former's victory over Austria in 1866 it became part of the Kingdom of Prussia. Then, in 1871, Prussia was subsumed into the newly united German Empire, in which Amrum was part of the Province of Schleswig-Holstein. The new Wilhelmine rulers disliked the "disorderly" old cemetery in Nebel and substituted die-straight walks, placing some 'talking' gravestones in the cemetery walls. In that location some weathered quickly and became illegible.

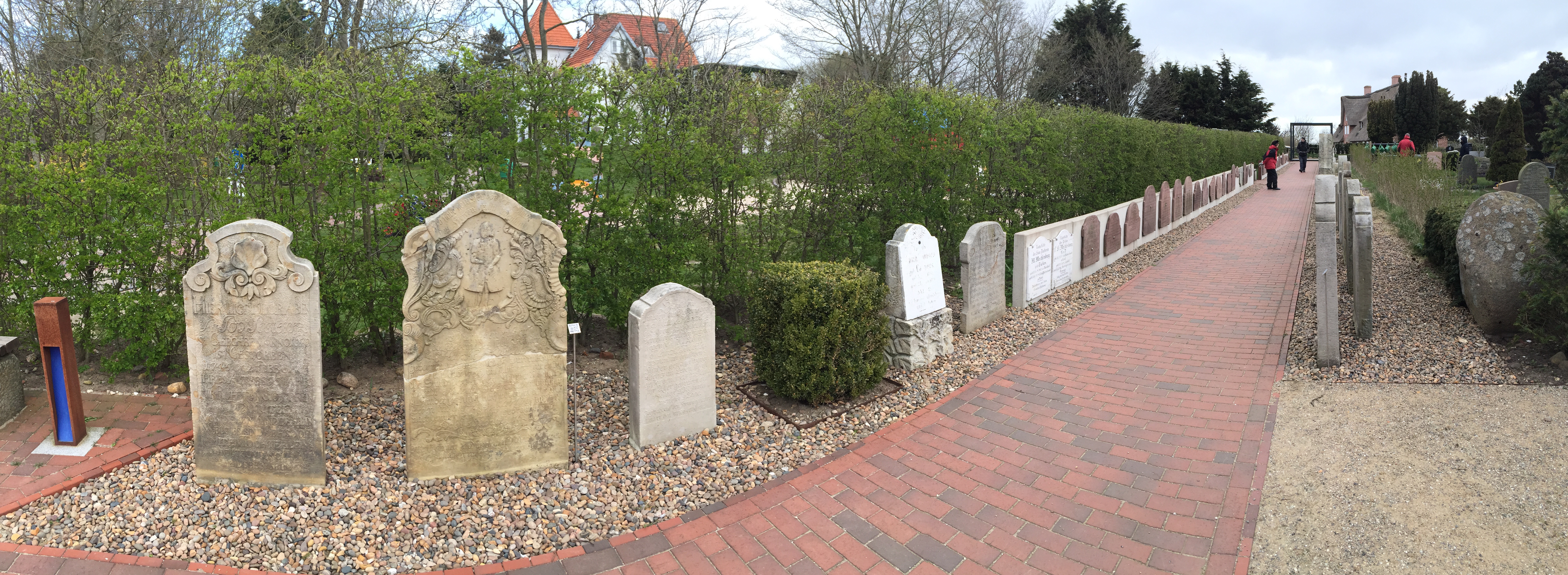
The Way of the Stones

In 2009, a group of local residents began a drive to restore the gravestones, though some could no longer be rescued. The project ultimately cost 330,000 euros.

For the new arrangement, the St. Clemens congregation placed the 152 gravestones in thematically related sections along a "Way of the Stones" (Allee der Steine).

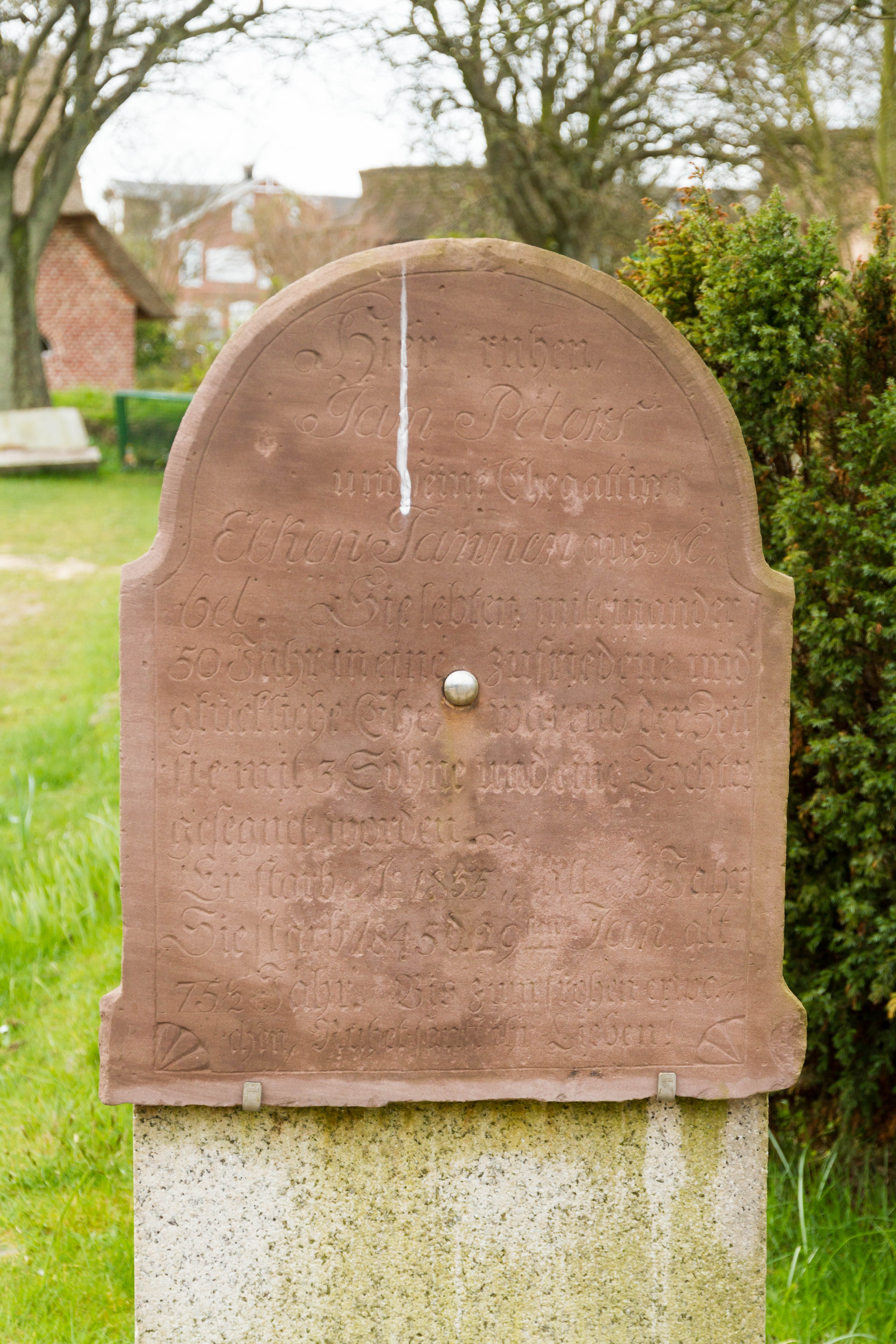
Gravestone of stonemason Jan Peters

== See also ==
- Talking Gravestones of Föhr
