= Jens Jacob Eschels =

Nautical captain (1757–1842)

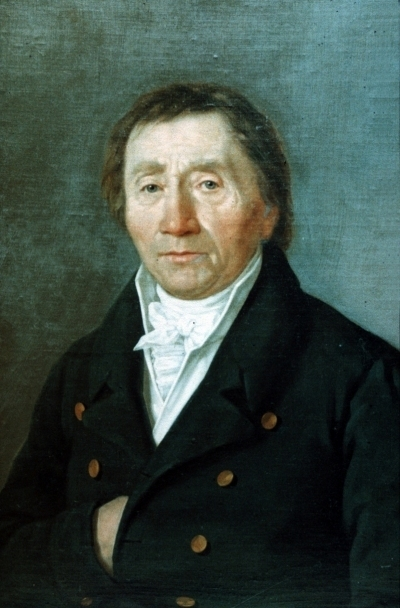
- Born: 12 December 1757; Nieblum, Denmark (now Germany)
- Died: 7 June 1842 (aged 84); Altona, Duchy of Holstein
- Occupation: Nautical captain
- Known for: The first German captain's autobiography
- Relatives: Matthias Petersen (great-great-grandfather)

Jens Jacob Eschels (12 December 1757 – 7 June 1842) was a nautical captain and is the author of the oldest known captain's autobiography in German.

== Life ==
Eschels, a great-great-grandchild of whaling captain Matthias Petersen, was born in Nieblum on the North Frisian island of Föhr, where many seafarers of the early modern era came from.

He was the son of a penniless family; his father often sailed "before the mast" for the Dutch East India Company. In 1769, aged eleven, Eschels joined the crew of an Amsterdam whaler as a deck boy, repeatedly lost his ship in the Arctic, but returned unharmed. Afterwards, he sailed on various Amsterdam whalers. During the winter season, he learned the "art of navigating".

In 1778, Eschels changed to the less dangerous and, in the long term, more prosperous trade shipping. He sailed all European seas. In 1781, he eventually crossed the Atlantic Ocean for the first time on a journey to the Caribbean. In Grenada, he was given the chance to move to a Hamburg-based ship as "sub-navigator". In the next year, he was accepted as navigator on the barque Henricus de Vierde. Due to illness and death of his captain in Haiti, he took over the post of the vessel's captain on the journey back to Europe and as such he would further command the ship on numerous journeys until 1798.

Later, Eschels stayed on land as German seafaring experienced difficulties due to the Napoleonic Wars. By his journeys, he had gathered certain assets and now worked as a manufacturer of tobacco products, as merchant, shipowner and expert in nautical questions in the then Danish town of Altona (which is now a part of Hamburg, Germany).

His comprehensive and enthralling autobiography was written based on diaries and ships' logs prior to 1832; originally, it was only intended for family purposes. It was published in 1835. The 355-page book not only provides a wealth of information about contemporary seafaring, but also offers a view on everyday life and thinking of the time. Eschels died in Altona in 1842.

== Bibliography ==
- Eschels, Jens Jacob (1835). Lebensbeschreibung eines alten Seemannes: Von ihm selbst und zunächst für seine Familie geschrieben [Biography of an old Seafarer: Written by Himself primarily for his Family] (in German).
- Leippe, Ulla, ed. (1966). Das abenteuerliche Leben des Jens Jacob Eschels aus Nieblum auf Föhr als Walfänger, Matrose, Kapitän und zuletzt als Reeder und Tabaksfabrikant in Altona von ihm selbst erzählt (in German). Hamburg: Brigantine.
- Lebensbeschreibung eines alten Seemannes (in German). Husum: Husum Druck- und Verlagsgesellschaft. 1983. ISBN 3-88042-201-X. Reprint of the 1835 edition.
- Sauer, Albrecht, ed. (2006). Lebensbeschreibung eines alten Seemannes (in German). Hamburg: Convent Verlag. ISBN 978-3-86633-003-0.
