= Hark Olufs =

North Frisian sailor and slave

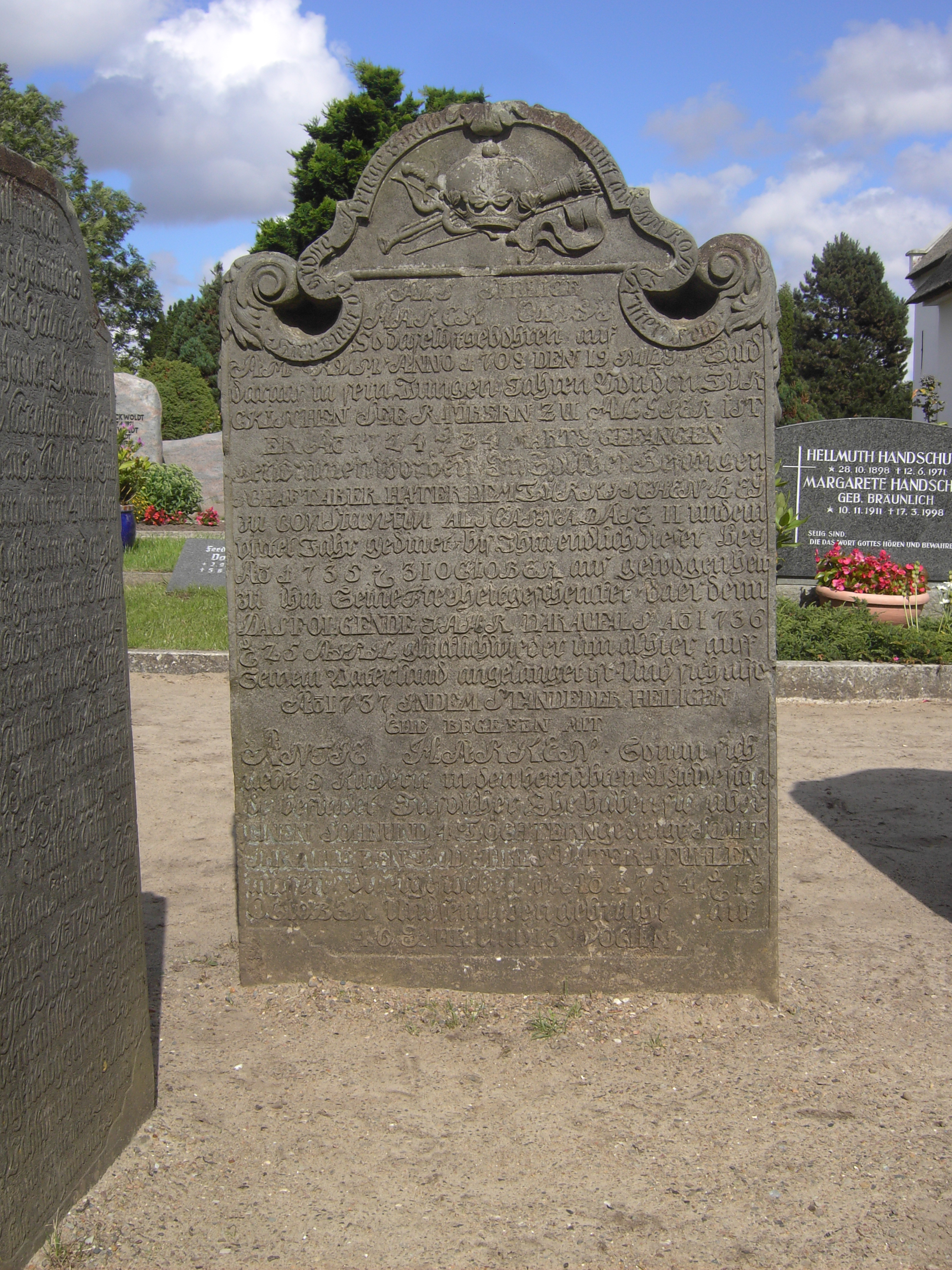
- Hark Olufs' tombstone in the cemetery of Nebel
- Born: 17 or 19 July 1708; Nebel, Denmark–Norway
- Died: 13 October 1754 (aged 46); Amrum, Denmark–Norway
- Resting place: Nebel; 54.6530°N 8.3558°E
- Citizenship: Danish
- Occupations: Sailor; treasurer; military commander
- Known for: Returning from Algerian slavery as a wealthy man
- Notable work: Autobiography
- Military career
- Allegiance: Regency of Algiers
- Branch: Life guards, later cavalry
- Service years: c. 1728–1735
- Rank: Agha ed-Deira (commander-in-chief)
- Conflicts: Conquest of Tunis (1735)

Hark Olufs (17 or 19 July 1708 – 13 October 1754) was a North Frisian sailor from Denmark–Norway. He was captured by Algerian pirates and sold into slavery. By successfully working as a slave servant to the Bey of Constantine, he eventually obtained his freedom from captivity.

== Life ==
Hark Olufs was born the son of a nautical captain named Oluf Jensen on either 17 or 19 July in 1708 on the North Frisian island of Amrum, which then belonged to Denmark. In 1721 he became a seaman on the Hoffnung, a ship belonging to his father.

In 1724, on a voyage from Nantes to Hamburg, Olufs’ ship was seized by Algerian pirates and he and his two cousins were taken hostage. Olufs' family could not afford the high price demanded in ransom by the Barbary slave traders for his release. Because the ship had been sailing under Hamburg colours, the family's request for a loan from the slavery fund of the Danish Kingdom was rejected.

Subsequently, Olufs was sold as a slave on Algiers' slave market. From 1724 to 1727/28 he was a slave servant of the Bey of Constantine and advanced in responsibility to become the Bey's treasurer. Between 1728 and 1732 he was made Commander of the Life Guards. In 1732 he became Agha ed-Deira, Commander in Chief of the local cavalry. In 1735, he took part in the conquest of Tunis by the Algerian army during the disposal of Al-Husayn I ibn Ali. As a reward, Olufs was released on 31 October and allowed to return to Amrum. In 1747 he published an autobiography in Danish, which was translated into German in 1751. Hark Olufs died on 13 October 1754, in Süddorf on Amrum. His headstone is still visible in the graveyard of Nebel.

== Legacy ==
Hark Oluf's life was chronicled in a biographical novel in 2010:

- Weinbörner, Udo (2010). Der General des Bay. Das abenteuerliche Leben des Amrumer Schiffsjungen Hark Olufs (in German). Bad Honnef: Horlemann. ISBN 978-3-89502-299-9.

== See also ==
- Turkish Abductions
- Sklavenkasse

== Sources ==
- "Ein Amrumer Schicksal im 18. Jahrhundert". Die Geschichte Norddeutschlands - Im Zeichen des Kreuzes (in German). 13 March 2007. Norddeutscher Rundfunk. Archived from the original on 17 March 2008.
- Klarer, Mario (2022). Barbary Captives: An Anthology of Early Modern Slave Memoirs by Europeans in North Africa. Columbia University Press. ISBN 978-0231175258.
- Olufs, Hark. "Harck Olufs,... Besynderlige AVANTURES,... (Autobiography)" (in Danish). Martin Rheinheimer. Archived from the original on 14 September 2007.
- Rheinheimer, Martin (2007). Der fremde Sohn. Hark Olufs' Wiederkehr aus der Sklaverei. (The alien Son. Hark Olufs' Return from Slavery.) (in German) (3rd ed.). Wachholtz. ISBN 978-3-529-02775-8.
- Rheinheimer, Martin (2001). "Hark Olufs and the Barbary States". University of Southern Denmark.
