= Matthias Petersen =

German Ostfrysk whaler (1632–1706)

Matthias Petersen der Glückliche (the Lucky)
- Matz Peters
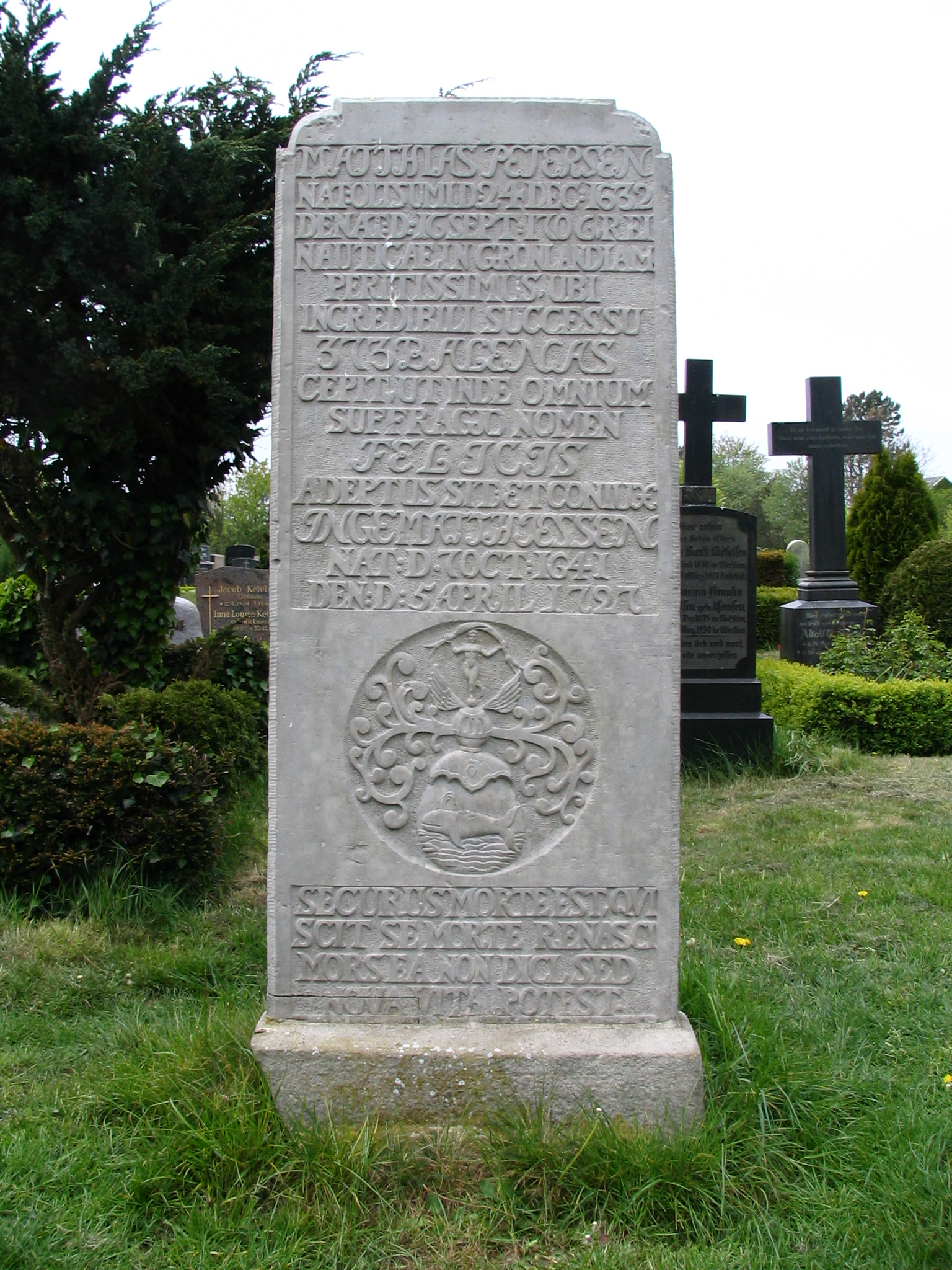
- Matthias Petersen's tombstone in Süderende
- Born: 24 December 1632; Oldsum, Föhr, Denmark. Now part of Germany.
- Died: 16 September 1706 (aged 73); Oldsum
- Resting place: Süderende; 54.716246°N 8.435684°E
- Other names: Glücklicher Matthias, Matthias der Glückliche, Mathis der Glückliche
- Citizenship: Danish
- Occupation: Whaler
- Years active: ca. 1644–1702
- Known for: Catching 373 whales

Matthias Petersen (born Matz Peters; 24 December 1632, in Oldsum – 16 September 1706) was a sea captain and whaler from Oldsum on the North Frisian island of Föhr. He became known for catching 373 whales throughout his career.

== Life ==
He was born as Matz Peters to a certain Peter Johnen (1595-1643) on Christmas Eve of 1632; his two older brothers were Jens (1627-1697) and Peter (1629-1678). He also had a younger brother, John (or Jon) (1641-1691) and two younger sisters, Thur and Jong Thur. As was the custom on the Frisian islands at the time, Peters left his home as a young boy of about 12 years to participate in the newly flourishing whaling business in the Netherlands and also took lessons in navigation. In the course of his travels he also changed his name to Matthias Petersen.

Known as "Glücklicher Matthias", "Matthias der Glückliche" or "Mathis der Glückliche", all of which translate to "Lucky Mathew", he became eventually famous by catching a total of 373 whales within five decades and for gathering great riches thereby. And that was, as his tomb in the graveyard of St. Lawrence's church in Süderende testifies, the reason why he "with everybody's approbation accepted the surname of Lucky".

The exploit of 373 caught whales was only possible since Petersen still participated in the so-called "bay fishery". At the time, the whalers would encounter great numbers of whales in the bays of Spitsbergen, so the catch for a successful return could quickly be made. Petersen also acquired his legendary catches due to his long experience as a navigator. Aged only 20, he had been made commander of a whaling vessel and for fifty years in total he would keep that occupation. As a result, he also made a financial fortune. During 19 voyages as a commander, Petersen acquired a total income of € 577,800 converted, which was a valuable asset given the circumstances of the time.

In 1677, Petersen and his brother donated two great brass chandeliers to the St. Laurentii parish which are still in use today in the church of St. Lawrence.

At the beginning of the Spanish War of Succession in 1701 Petersen's eldest son Matz, who was a commander as well, was abducted to St. Malo by a French privateer but was later released for ransom. On his last voyage in 1702 Petersen himself was caught when his ship was seized by a French privateer. He and his crew were only released after paying a ransom of 8,000 Reichsthalers. In the same year, his sons Ock and John would fall in battle with a French pirate.

Matthias Petersen died in 1706 on his native island Föhr. His tombstone displays a vita in Latin and a coat of arms with the goddess of fortune and a whale.

== Offspring ==
Matthias Petersen had his children homeschooled by a private teacher. So his sons were able to study at a university. Clement became a preacher in Schwesing and presumably it was him who wrote the Latin text for the inscription on his father's tomb.

Another son, Peter Matthiesen, studied at the Latin school of Husum and the University of Jena. He became bailiff of Eastern Föhr, Wyk auf Föhr and even Sylt at the same time.

His son, also a Peter Matthiesen, later became bailiff of Eastern Föhr and bailiff in the district of Western Föhr and Amrum. By Count Struensee, a university companion, Mathiessen, Jr. was made mayor of Copenhagen in 1771. After Struensee's execution for treason he remained influential and became director of the trade and fisheries school in the then-time Danish town of Altona. From there, he helped to convey posts in the Greenland trade to many seafarers from Föhr.

One great-great-grandson of Matthias Petersen, Jens Jacob Eschels from Nieblum on Föhr, became known by writing a detailed autobiography of his own exploits as a whaler and merchant captain.

According to an 1811 family chronicle, American author and naturalist Peter Matthiessen (1927–2014) was also a descendant of Matthias Petersen. Petersen's son Jung-Ocke (also known as Otto, 1679–1764) was his ancestor. In the late 1980s, Peter Matthiessen visited Föhr island and mentioned the voyage in an autobiographical essay.

It is a lesser known fact that Matthias Petersen bequeathed 100 gold florins to the church which were not paid out by his heirs. After many years of quarrelling, the parish eventually decided to move Petersen's tomb, which had been installed inside the church amid great pomp 14 years prior, out into the graveyard where it still can be seen today.
