= Oluf Braren =

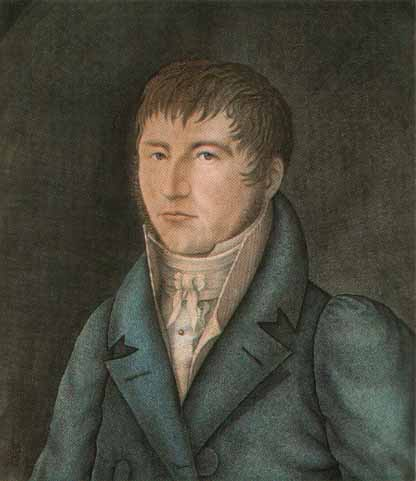
- Self-portrait around 1820
- Born: 25 February 1787; Oldsum, Denmark (now Germany)
- Died: 22 March 1839 (aged 52); Toftum, Denmark (now Germany)
- Education: Self-educated
- Known for: Painting
- Movement: Naïve art

Oluf Braren (25 February 1787 – 22 March 1839) was a painter of naïve art from the north Frisian island of Föhr. Some of his works show a strong affinity to his Frisian homeland.

His paintings include portraits and depictions of public life as well as religious and mythological motifs. Later works are influenced by Wilhelm Tischbein's art. Unknown and little appreciated during his lifetime, Braren's paintings became greatly valued during the 20th century.

== Life ==
Oluf Braren was born in Oldsum on Föhr in North Frisia. His father was a blacksmith and farmer. Aged 19 years, Braren became a teacher on the neighbouring island of Sylt after having educated himself in private study. His nephew Brar C. Braren noted that Oluf Braren had never had any other teachers than books. On 25 September 1808 he married a local woman named Meete Wilhelms. In addition to painting, Braren also enjoyed studying nature and built up an extensive natural history collection.

Around 1810, the couple moved to Utersum on Föhr where Braren worked as a teacher. There he began an affair with Ing Peter Matzen, a woman from the nearby hamlet of Hedehusum. That relationship lasted for about seven years and spawned two children while Braren's marriage remained without child. When it eventually became public, Braren lost his employment and was posted to Toftum to work as an auxiliary teacher—at a third of a regular teacher's salary.

Ing Peter Matzen's brother Peter Nahmen Matthiesen had befriended Braren and took lessons in painting and sketching from him. As Mathiessen developed an unusual talent around 1818, he went to Eutin to learn from Wilhelm Tischbein. Braren accompanied his former student on the journey and it is known that he stayed with Tischbein for a week. Thus he was at least indirectly influenced by Tischbein's art as can be seen in his later works.

In 1839 Braren died in Toftum, impoverished, from tuberculosis.

== Reception ==
His work was little known during his life and was not appreciated. Still in 1897 when the legacy of his nephew Jürgen Braren was distributed, the relatives preferred a microscope to three paintings by Oluf Braren. Only in the 20th century has his work become highly valued in Germany and the international art world.

Oluf Braren's life has been treated in two biographical novels:

- Munier-Wroblewski, Mia (1948). Olaf Braren [sic] (in German). Meissner. Modern edition: Munier-Wroblewski, Mia (2010). Arno Bammé; Thomas Steensen (eds.). Olaf Braren: Ein Menschenleben zwischen Wunsch und Wirklichkeit (in German). Husum: Husum Druck und Verlagsgesellschaft. ISBN 978-3-89876-501-5.
- Schmidt, Olaf (2006). Friesenblut (Frisian Blood) (in German). Eichborn-Verlag. ISBN 978-3-8218-0770-6.

== Selected works ==
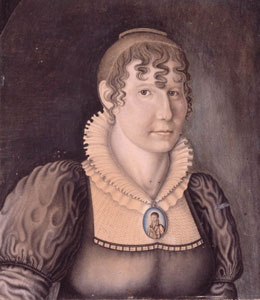
Portrait of his wife, Meta

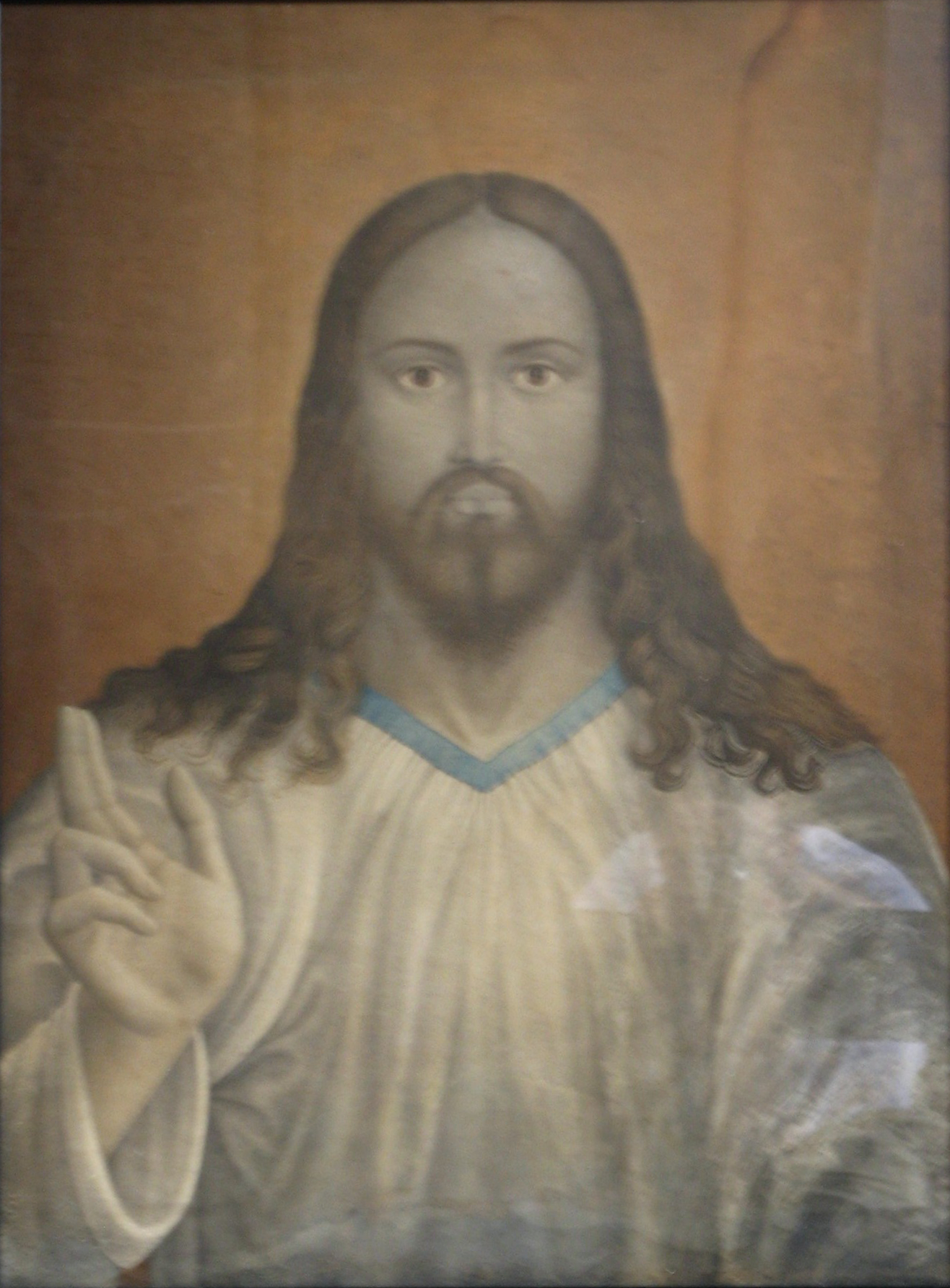
Jesus Christ

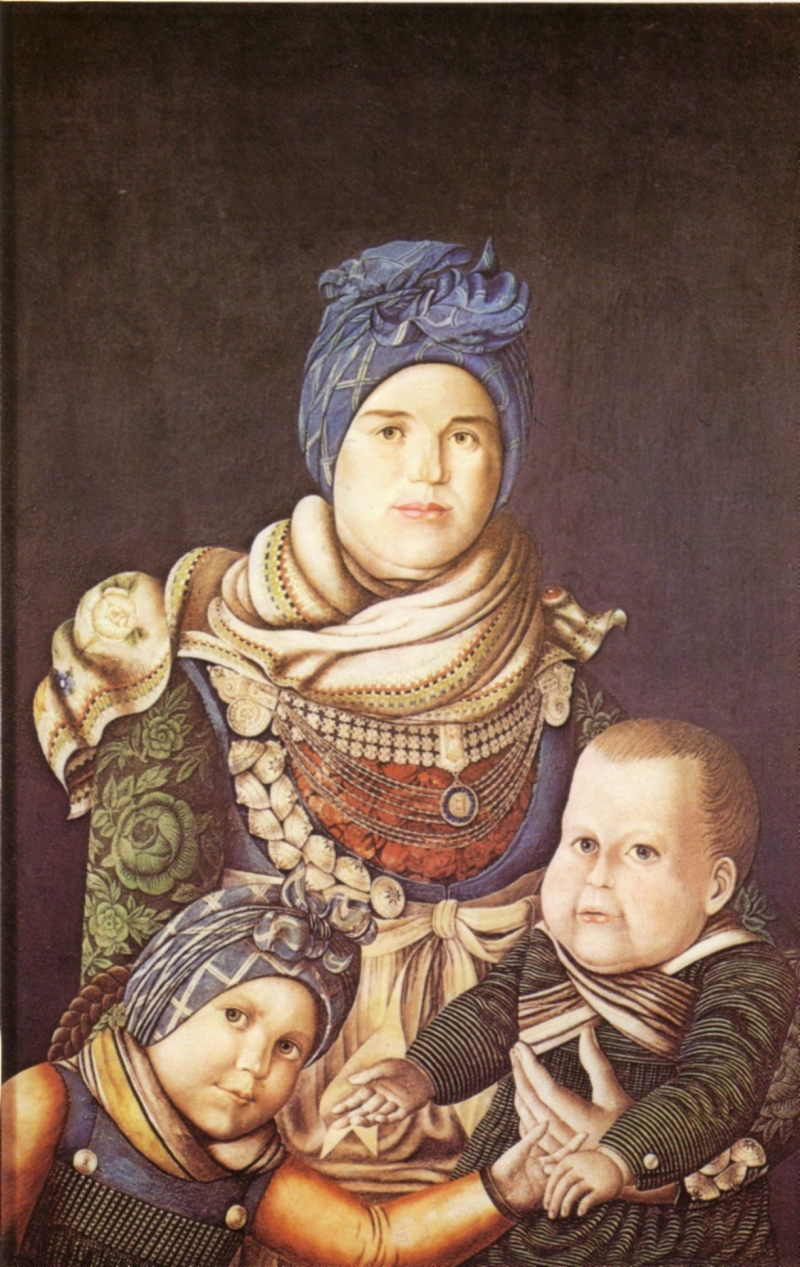
Braren's lover Ing Peter Matzen and their two children Gardina and Peter as depicted by him around 1820

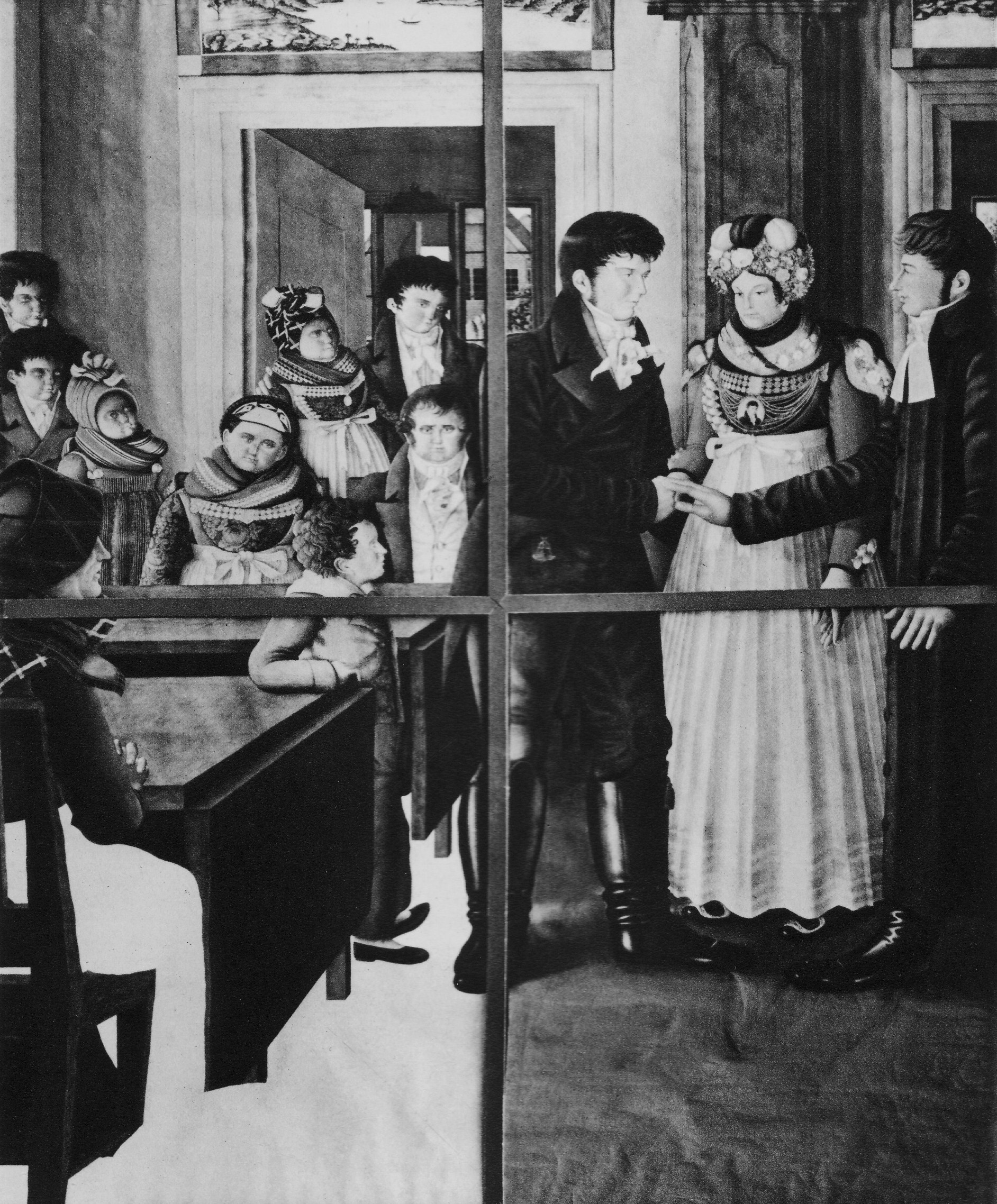
Domestic Wedding on Föhr (later version, unfinished), c. 1830. It is believed that this painting shows the wedding of Braren's sister Kerrin in 1811.
