= Hinrich Braren =

- Born: 31 August 1751; Oldsum, Denmark (now Germany)
- Died: 4 August 1826 (aged 74); Tönning, Duchy of Schleswig
- Other names: Hinrich Brarens
- Occupations: Navigator, nautical examiner, pilot inspector
- Known for: writing the first text book on navigation in German language
- Relatives: Robert Miles Sloman (son-in-law); Ulrich Wille (great-grandson)

Hinrich Braren (31 August 1751, Oldsum – 4 August 1826, Tönning), later known as Hinrich Brarens, was a Danish sea captain, pilot inspector and nautical examiner. He wrote the first book on navigation in German language and established the first public nautical school in the Duchy of Schleswig. Within 30 years as a nautical teacher he examined about 3,500 navigator candidates.

== Life ==
Hinrich Braren was born in 1751 in Oldsum on the North Frisian island of Föhr to whaling captain Brar Hinrichen. Only aged 12 he went to sea with his father and each year from 1763 to 1780 he used to sail to Greenland as a whaler. In 1780 he changed to merchant shipping and was incidentally able to acquire the full command over one of the ships of his Dutch ship-owner in the Mediterranean Sea. In 1786, while Braren sailed from Copenhagen to Greenland as a seal catcher for the Royal Greenlandic Trade, he received the order to support a Danish expedition that was determined to explore the east coast of Greenland.

Inspired by this expedition Braren settled down as a navigation teacher on Föhr and opened a private nautical school. In 1794 he was also a merchant and harbourmaster in Wyk auf Föhr. In 1796 he was granted an examinator's license and the permission to establish a public nautical school. This school was later moved to Tönning at the mouth of the Eider river when Braren was posted there as inspector for the maritime pilots on the Eider and the Eider Canal. Due to the Continental System during the Napoleonic Wars, Tönning had become an important commercial harbour for a short time.

During his work as a nautical teacher, Braren became aware of the lack of suitable books in German language since Dutch literature was common at the time. Therefore, he wrote the textbook System der praktischen Steuermannskunde [System of a practical Navigation] which was published in 1800 in Magdeburg and had three further editions. In 1807 he wrote another textbook System der praktischen Schifferkunde [System of a practical Shipmaster's Knowledge] and in 1820 he edited a nautical almanac in Altona. System der praktischen Schifferkunde received international acclaim and has been called the most advanced nautical textbook of its time in central Europe. This assessment is based on the fact that Braren not only published nautical lessons but was the first author to include physics, law of the sea and business administration. Also, 150 years prior to its official introduction at German nautical academies, the topic of human resource management was already part of this book.

The two "practical" textbooks remained in use in northern Germany until the late 19th century. Hinrich Brarens worked as a nautical examiner for 30 years and examined some 3,500 candidates. A certificate issued by his school and signed by him in March 1826 bears the running number 3,422.

Apart from his nautical textbooks, Braren also wrote a philosophical and religious treatise in 1819: Gedanken über die Frage: Was sind wir Menschen? Was wissen wir? [Thoughts on the Question: What are we humans? What do we know?].

=== Personal life ===
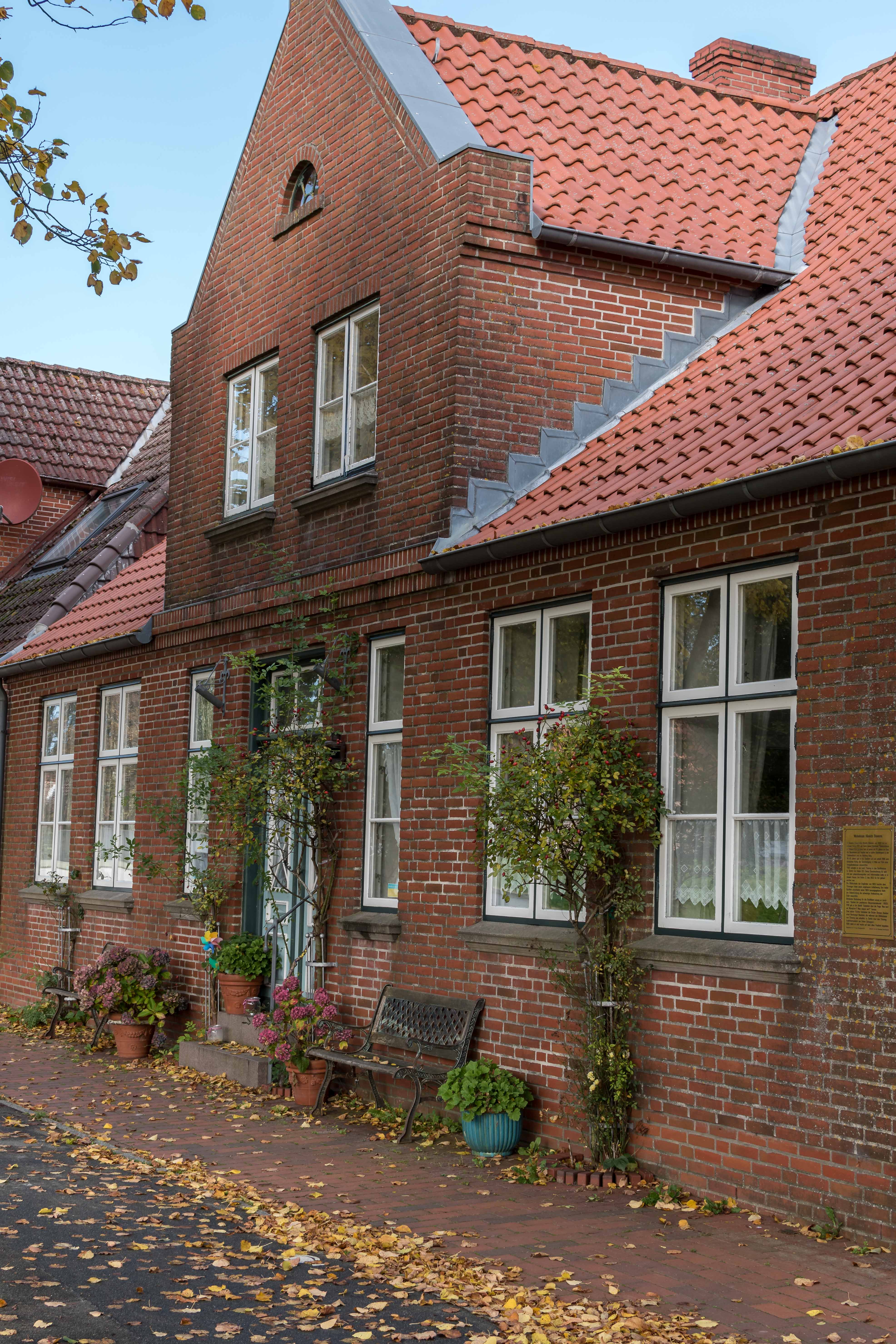
Hinrich Brarens' house in Tönning

In 1773 Hinrich Braren married his first wife Thur (née Früdden, born 15 March 1751 in Oldsum) who changed her name to Dorothea Brarens in Tönning. She died in 1809. Hinrich Braren was married a second time to Margaretha, née Steffens, from Itzehoe. His first marriage spawned ten children while the second marriage remained without child. His daughter Gundalena (born Jung Göntje Braren) married the Hamburg based ship-owner and ship-broker Robert Miles Sloman in 1806, four years later her sister Göntje married Sloman's brother John Miles. Gundalena's daughter Eliza was the mother of Swiss general Ulrich Wille.

After their removal to Tönning the family had changed their name to Brarens.

== Bibliography ==
- Hinrich Brarens (1800). System der praktischen Steuermannskunde (in German). Magdeburg: Wilhelm Heinrichshofen. Further editions in 1807, 1819 and 1844.
- — (1807). System der praktischen Schifferkunde (in German). Friedrichstadt. Further edition in 1819 (Magdeburg: Wilhelm Heinrichshofen).
- — (1819). Gedanken über die Frage: Was sind wir Menschen? Was wissen wir? (in German).
- —, ed. (1820). Besteckbuch [Nautical almanac] (in German). Altona.
