= Robert Miles Sloman =

English-German shipbuilder (1783–1867)

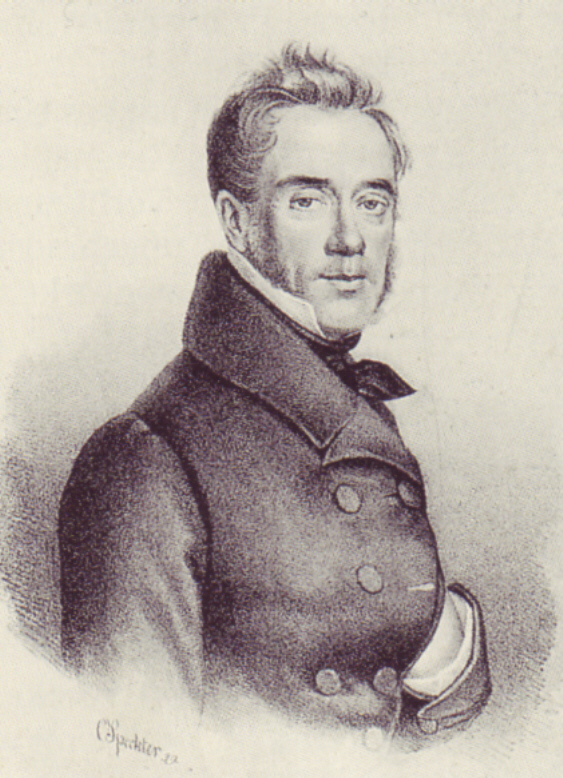
Robert Miles Sloman in 1839

Robert Miles Sloman (23 October 1783, Great Yarmouth – 2 January 1867, Hamburg) was an English-German shipbuilder and ship owner.

== Biography ==
=== Shipping ===
Robert Miles Sloman was the son of William Sloman, an English ship's captain who in 1785 settled in Hamburg with his wife and two sons William Palgrave Sloman and Robert Miles Sloman. William Sloman became a Hamburg citizen in 1791 and established his first company in 1798 as a ship broker. On his death in 1800 Robert Miles Sloman, then 17 years old inherited the ship broker business and a few sailing ships. After the Treaty of Amiens (25 March 1802) Robert Miles went to Antwerp to found a shipbroking-company but as war broke out again he had to return to Hamburg. Napoleon I then blocked the harbour of Hamburg as part of the Continental System so Sloman moved his business to Tönning at the mouth of the river Eider, then a part of Denmark. In 1806 he married Gundalena Brarens, the daughter of pilot inspector and nautical examiner Hinrich Brarens from Tönning.

Denmark eventually joined the Continental System but the company survived. In 1814 Sloman reopened his shipping business, at first in Cuxhaven English Consul. When French troops gave up Hamburg, Sloman returned but his last ship sailing under English colours was confiscated by the French and it was not insured properly. Under Hamburg laws as a broker Sloman was forbidden to act as a ship owner so his captains, who part-owned the ships founded ghost-shipping-companies.

The shipping company Rob. M. Sloman & CO. oHG took passengers to and from England but on 17 February 1836 the shipping company opened the first regular transatlantic service from Hamburg to New York with the bark Franklin and two other sailing packets. On 8 May 1841 Sloman and eight other shipowners formed Hanseatische Dampfschiffahrts-Compagnie and built in England two paddle steamers, the Hamburg and the Manchester which sailed to and from Kingston upon Hull and by 1846 the transatlantic fleet had grown to seven. The Sloman Line had a competitor in the Hamburg- Amerikanische Packetfahrt Aktien-Gesellschaft which was formed in May 1847. When their first sailing packet, Deutschland, left Hamburg on her maiden voyage in October 1848, Sloman responded in 1850 by changing from sail to steam with the British-built, iron-hulled screw steamship, Helena Sloman. This ship was lost on only her third transatlantic voyage. Another iron screw ship was ordered by Sloman in 1853, but then Hamburg- America decided to switch from sail to steam. Sloman immediately offered to run a joint service with his rival's steamships, but they rejected his proposal. Hamburg-America's transatlantic steamship service began on 1 June 1856, when the Borussia set off for New York with sister-ship Hammonia following a month later. Sloman gave up on steamships and remained a sailing packet line. In 1898 R Slowman Company bought the 3739 ton steamer Moravia from the American Hamburg Line and renamed it the Parma.

=== Other activities ===
Robert Sloman with business associates Johann Cesar VI. Godeffroy, Johann Christian Jauch, Ernst Merck and Johann Heinrich Schröder organised the Internationale Landwirtschaftsaustellung (International Agricultural Exhibition) at Heiligengeistfeld in 1863 and was a member of its guarantee fund. In 1865 he was a joint founder of the German Maritime Search and Rescue Service.

Sloman was a member of the Hamburg Parliament from 1859 to 1861.
