= Harhoog =

Dolmen on the island of Sylt, Germany

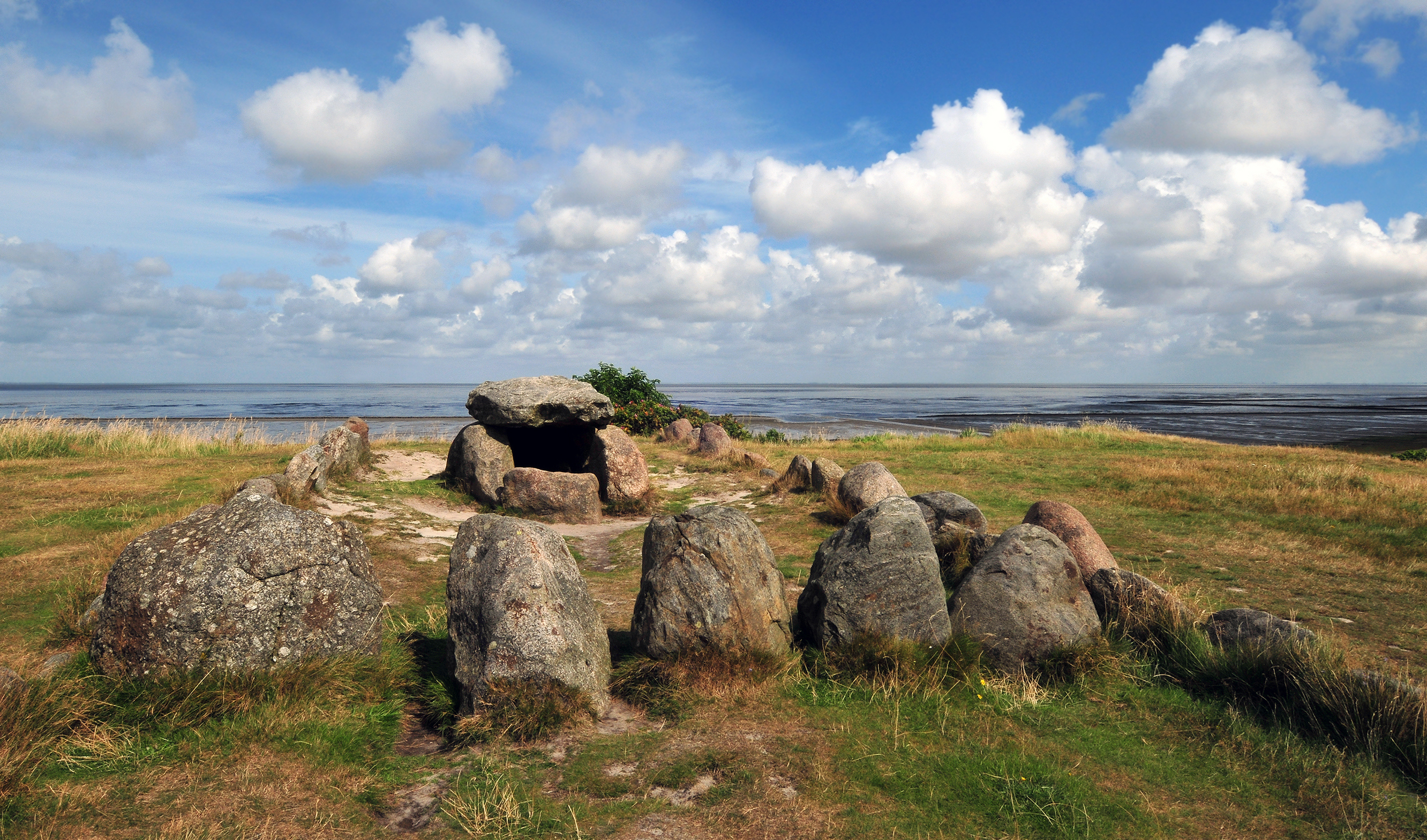
- The dolmen in 2012

- Location in Schleswig-Holstein, Germany
- 54.8907°N 8.3826°E
- Type: Dolmen
- Periods: Neolithic
- Location: Sylt, Schleswig-Holstein, Germany

History
- Built: c. 3000 BC

Site notes
- Material: Stone
- Discovered: 1925
- Public access: Yes

The Harhoog is a dolmen, a rectangular megalithic tomb from the Funnelbeaker culture, located near Keitum on the island of Sylt in Schleswig-Holstein, Germany. Discovered in 1925, it was moved to the present site in 1954 when a new airport was developed.

== Geography ==
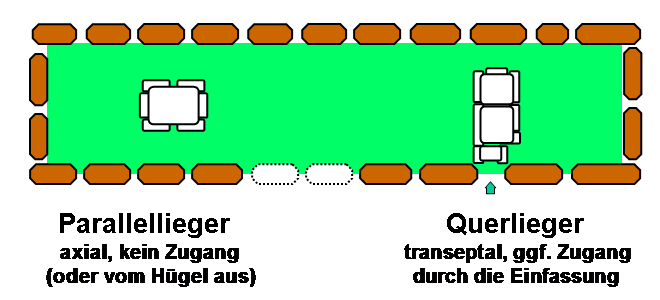
Layout of the Harhoog dolmens with parallel and transverse graves

The megalithic Harhoog burial chambers were originally located near the mud-flats between Keitum and Tinnum. The stones were moved to the area near the Tipkenhoog on the coast near Keitum in 1954, when Sylt Airport was under development.

The chambers contain parallel and transverse sections.

== History ==
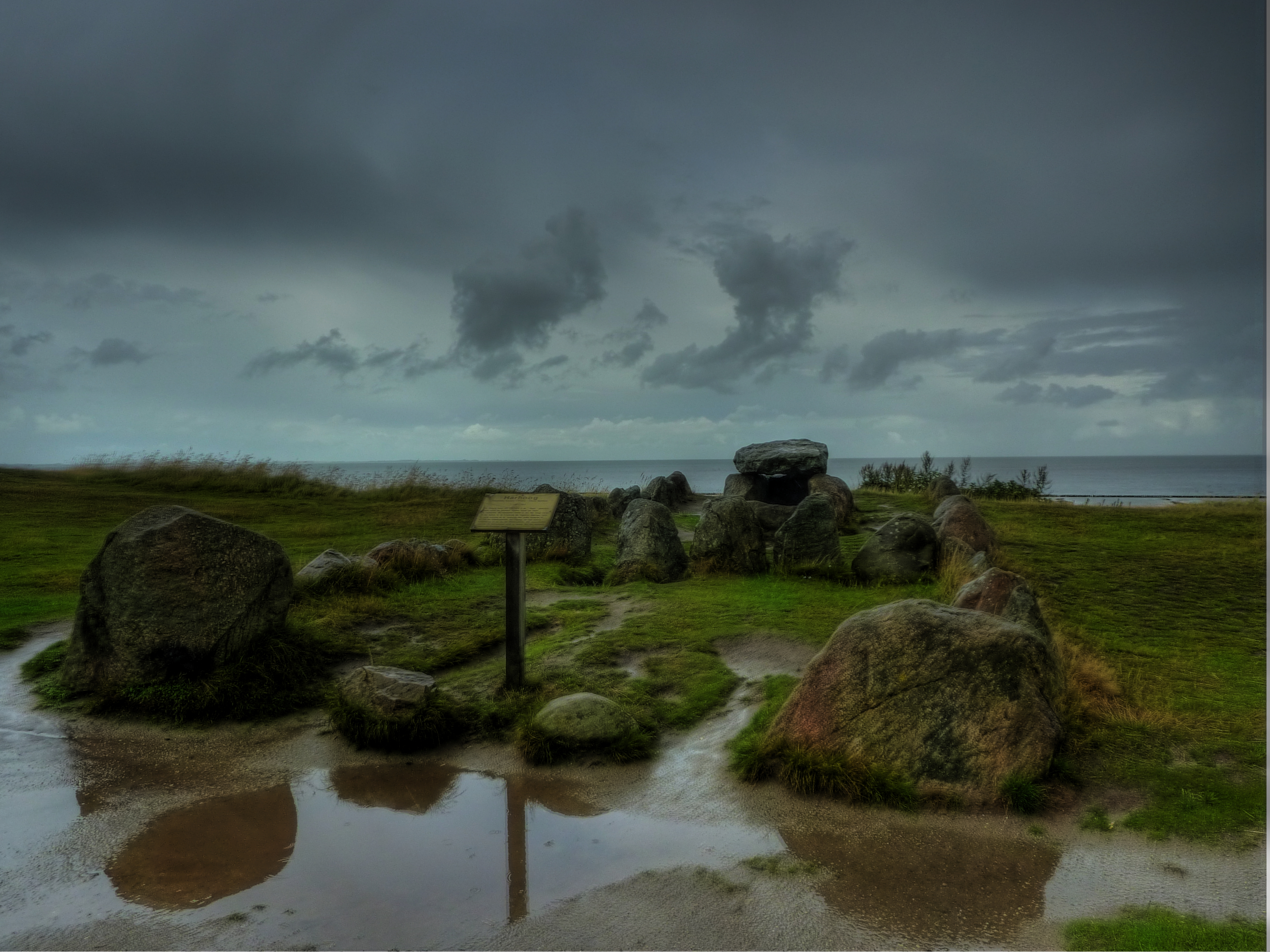
Harhoog

The graves at Harhoog are dated to the Neolithic and belonged to ancient settlements of the island's Funnelbeaker culture, probably around 3000 BC. There were once around 600 of them but today only about half of them still exist.

The megalithic tombs are built with large, rough stone slabs (one or more) which are arranged in different patterns. Harhoog dolmen is an extended dolmen, under Ernst Sprockhoff's six-category classification; the other five types are simple dolmen, great dolmen, passage grave, long barrows (without a burial chamber) and cist.

Harhhog was discovered in 1925 during excavations of earth for the construction of the Hindenburgdamm, but was only inspected archaeologically in 1936.
