= List of public art in Sylt =

This is a list of public art, including dolmen, on the island of Sylt.

== Archsum ==
Image	Article	Coordinate location	Creator	Type of art
	Hünenbetten von Archsum	54.864919°N 8.372011°E		dolmen
	Kolkingehoog	54.857294°N 8.38055°E		dolmen
	Merelmerskhoog	54.864853°N 8.373467°E		dolmen

== Kampen ==
Image	Article	Coordinate location	Creator	Type of art
	Ganggrab bei Kampen	54.955°N 8.3372°E		dolmen
	MEERTOR		Jörg Plickat	sculpture (set up 2011, removed 2018)

== Keitum ==
Image	Article	Coordinate location	Creator	Type of art
	Harhoog	54.890694444444°N 8.3825555555556°E		Megalithic tomb
	Tipkenhoog	54.891075°N 8.3813861111111°E		dolmen
"Tisch am Kliff" zum Thema "5000 Jahre Sylter Geschichte" 2019 aufgestellt am Sylt Museum in Keitum auf Sylt "Table at the Cliff", Bronze reliefs "Whale in a moving sea" and "Hill grave" by Ingo Kühl 2019	Grünes Kliff	54.89486°N 8.374156°E		"Table at the Cliff" on the subject of "5000 years of Sylt history" 2019 situated at the Sylt Museum in Keitum, Sylt Produced in two bronze reliefs each by the five artists Ingo Kühl, Hans Joachim Pohl, Edda Raspe, Walter vom Hove and Hans Jürgen Westphal, 2019

== Westerland ==
Image	Article	Coordinate location	Creator	Type of art
	Friedhof der Heimatlosen	54.90563889°N 8.30069444°E		Cemetery for the nameless
	Giants in the wind	54.9077054°N 8.3095155°E	Martin Wolke	Sculpture
	Roland of Westerland	54.9183°N 8.30853°E		Sculpture
	Save our seas	54.908547°N 8.298621°E	Serge Mangin	Sculpture
	Statue of Heinrich von Stephan	54.908615°N 8.307111°E	Hugo Berwald	Sculpture
	Westerland bird sculpture	54.909251°N 8.300833°E		Sculpture
	Westerland promenade sculpture	54.90875°N 8.298529°E		Sculpture
	Westerland promenade sculpture	54.908441°N 8.298449°E		Sculpture
	Westerland promenade wave sculpture	54.908334°N 8.29819°E		Sculpture
	Westerland sculpture	54.910211°N 8.300943°E		Sculpture
	Westerland sculpture	54.90945°N 8.300333°E		Sculpture
	Westerland tide meter	54.907615°N 8.304202°E		
	Wilhelmine	54.9075516°N 8.3066782°E		Fountain

== Misc ==
Image	Article	Place	Coordinate location	Creator	Type of art
	Großsteingräber bei Morsum	Morsum	54.86208889°N 8.44603889°E		dolmen
	Langhügel von Tinnum	Tinnum	54.9088°N 8.33333°E		dolmen
