= Archsum =

- Ortsteil of Gemeinde Sylt
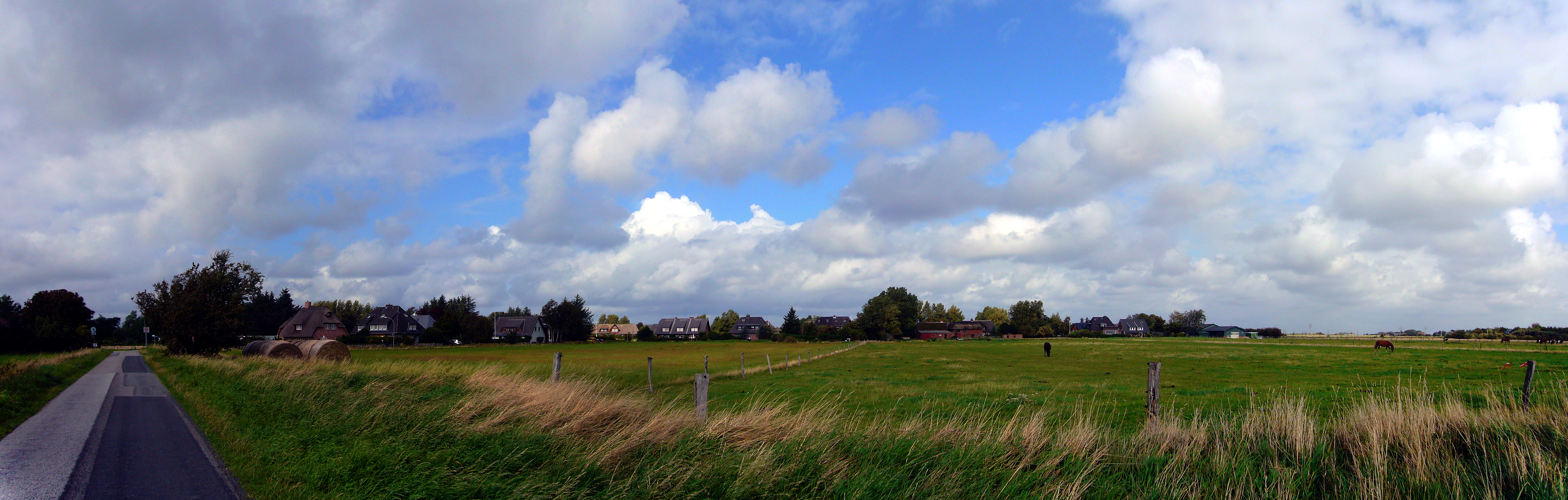
- Interactive map of Archsum
- Location within Germany Location within Schleswig-Holstein
- Coordinates: 54°52′N 8°23′E
- Country: Germany
- State: Schleswig-Holstein
- District: Nordfriesland
- Town: Gemeinde Sylt

Government
  - Mayor: Nikolas Häckel "Gemeinde Sylt"
- Time zone: UTC+01:00 (CET)
  - Summer (DST): UTC+02:00 (CEST)
- Dialling codes: 04651
- Vehicle registration: NF
- Website: www.gemeinde-sylt.de

Archsum (German pronunciation: [ˈaʁçzʊm]; North Frisian: Ārichsem; Danish: Arksum) is a village on the North Sea island of Sylt in the district of Nordfriesland in Schleswig-Holstein, Germany. Today, it is an Ortsteil of the Gemeinde Sylt.

== Etymology ==
Archsum (North Frisian: Arichsem) derives from "settlement of Arke" or "settlement of Erke".

== History ==
Based on burial sites found in the 1930s, the area was settled as early as the Neolithic.

Arxsum was first mentioned in 1462. In 1611, there were 38 farms and the population totalled around 150. In 1709, 25 men out of 53 families were seafarers. Whaling helped to boost the number of inhabitants to 259 by 1745 (40 mariners). Many ship masters built houses in Archsum after retiring. By 1850, the number of farms had fallen back to 45. By 1952, the population had declined to just 129. Only during the 1930s, when Sylt was fortified by the military, did the number of inhabitants rise briefly (1939: 306, half of which belonged to the Reichsarbeitsdienst). Until the Nössedeich was constructed in 1936/37, the area was liable to flooding which destroyed both harvests and homes.

== Geography ==
Archsum is located roughly 6 kilometres southeast of Westerland, between Keitum and Morsum. The village territory covers 679 hectares.

== Demographics ==
Archsum has a population of around 240 (2013).

== Economy ==
Agriculture and seafaring were long the mainstays of the Archsum economy. Since 1961, Archsum has held the status of Luftkurort (climatic spa). Today, tourism dominates the local economy.

== Attractions ==
Local Neolithic sites include the Merelmerskhoog, a 4,500-year-old passage grave. Raised areas that served as dwelling sites such as the Firstklent, were excavated in 1969-73 by Joachim Reinstein, yielding findings from the Stone and Bronze Age. Dwellings were discovered that pointed to a 2,000-year-old village, and another settlement likely in use between 700 and 1000 AD. The last visible remains of the so-called Archsumburg (a circular rampart with an internal diameter of roughly 65 metres, built around 2,000 years ago) were probably removed around 1860.

== Government ==
In the Gebietsreform of 1970, Archsum became part of Sylt-Ost. Sylt-Ost was merged on 1 January 2009 with Rantum and the town of Westerland. In separate referendums in 2008, Westerland (by a large majority) and Sylt-Ost (narrowly) agreed to the merger in May 2008. Rantum followed. In September 2008, the merger contract was signed.

Archsum is now an Ortsteil of Gemeinde Sylt. Since 1 May 2015, the mayor of Gemeinde Sylt has been Nikolas Häckel.

== Infrastructure ==
=== Transport ===
The K117 road connects Archsum to Morsum as well as to Keitum and Westerland. Sylter Verkehrsgesellschaft operates buses that provide public transport on the island.
