= Munkmarsch =

- Ortsteil of Gemeinde Sylt
- Interactive map of Munkmarsch
- Location within Germany Location within Schleswig-Holstein
- Coordinates: 54°55′N 8°21′E
- Country: Germany
- State: Schleswig-Holstein
- District: Nordfriesland
- Town: Gemeinde Sylt
- Time zone: UTC+01:00 (CET)
  - Summer (DST): UTC+02:00 (CEST)
- Dialling codes: 04651
- Vehicle registration: NF
- Website: www.gemeinde-sylt.de

Munkmarsch (German pronunciation: [ˈmʊŋkˌmaʁʃ]; North Frisian: Munkmersk; Danish: Munkmarsk) is a village on the North Sea island of Sylt in the district of Nordfriesland in Schleswig-Holstein, Germany. Today, it is an Ortsteil of the Gemeinde Sylt.

== Etymology ==
Munkmarsch (Frisian: Munkmersk) derives from "marsh of the monks".

== History ==
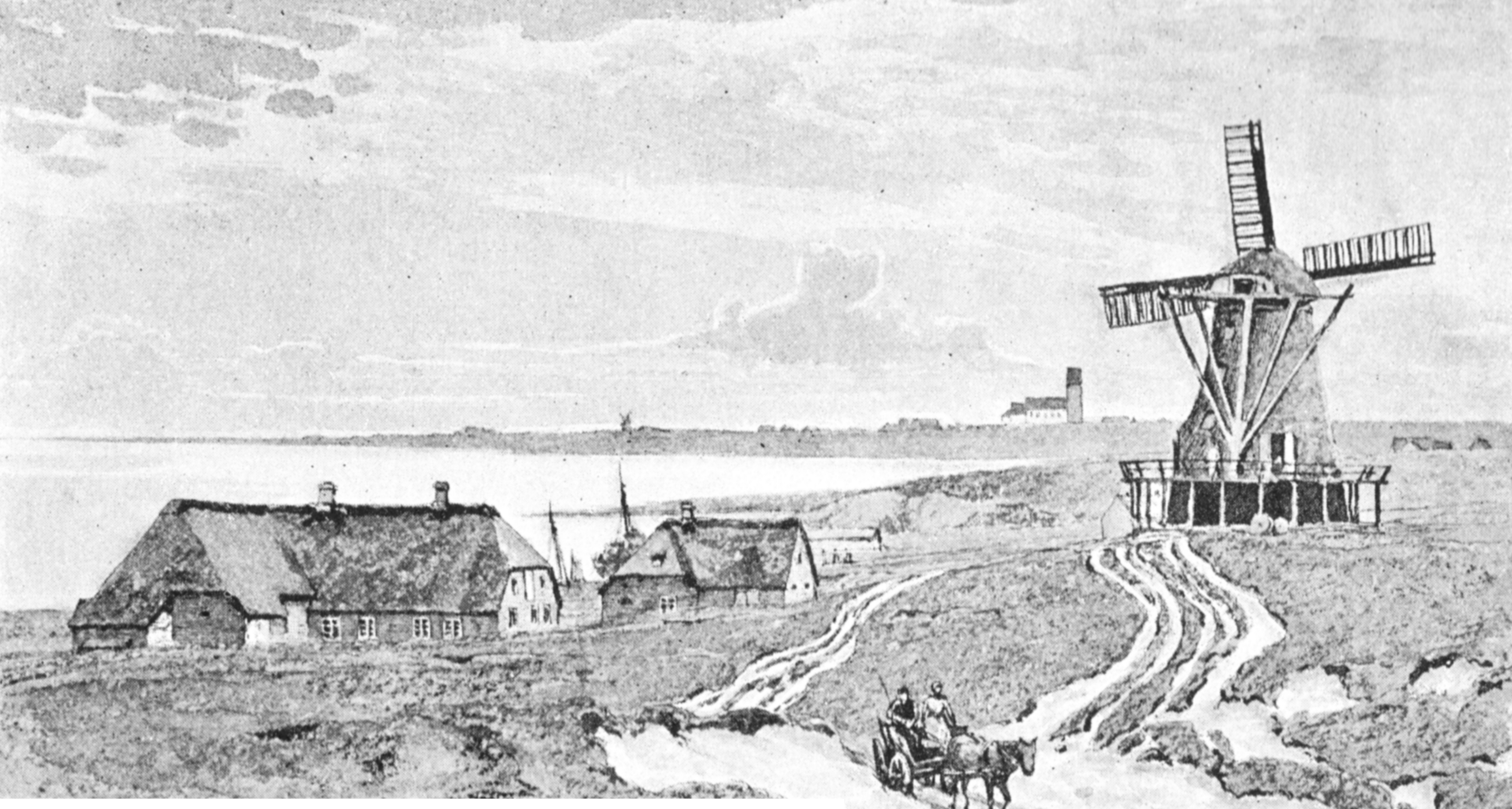
Munkmarsch mill circa 1895

The village is located on territory that once belonged to the monastery of St. Canute's Abbey, Odense. In 1573, the area was known as Sankt Knutsmarsch. A 1648 map referred to Munckmarsch, a map from 1778 used Monckmarsch. In 1744, a mill was constructed, flour produced there was mainly sent to Norway. From 1755, mail boats touched at the local harbour. The port was the main connection between Sylt and the mainland after Keitum harbour silted up in the 1850s. In 1859, a 100-metre pier for ferry ships was constructed. Paddlesteamers docked there and the passengers then took coaches to Westerland. In 1869, an inn was built, this later became the Fährhaus which still exists today. A shipyard was also constructed. In 1888, Munkmarsch was linked to Westerland by the Sylter Inselbahn, reducing the travel time to 12 minutes. Munkmarsch retained some of its importance until construction of the Hindenburgdamm in 1927, although after 1901 ferry traffic increasingly shifted to Hörnum. During World War I, Munkmarsch was a major landing area for materiel and men when the island was fortified.

== Geography ==
Munkmarsch is located between Braderup and Keitum on the Wadden Sea side of the island.

== Demographics ==
Munkmarsch has a population of around 100 (2013).

== Economy ==
Today, tourism dominates the local economy.

The port now serves as a marina and is used by Sylter Segel-Club. To the north of the village there are gravel pits in which sand for local construction is won and which have also yielded numerous fossils in the past.

== Attractions ==
Today, the 19th-century Fährhaus is a luxury hotel which sports a restaurant with two Michelin stars.

== Government ==
Prior to the Gebietsreform of 1970, Munkmarsch had been an Ortsteil of Keitum. In 1970, it became part of Sylt-Ost. Sylt-Ost was merged on 1 January 2009 with Rantum and the town of Westerland. In separate referendums in 2008, Westerland (by a large majority) and Sylt-Ost (narrowly) agreed to the merger in May 2008. Rantum followed. In September 2008, the merger contract was signed.

Munkmarsch is now an Ortsteil of Gemeinde Sylt. Since 1 May 2015, the mayor of Gemeinde Sylt has been Nikolas Häckel.

== Infrastructure ==
=== Transport ===
The K118 road connects Munkmarsch to Keitum and Braderup. Sylter Verkehrsgesellschaft operates buses that provide public transport on the island.

Sylt Airport is located immediately to the west of the village. However, the terminal is on the western side of the airfield, near Westerland.
