= Tinnum =

- Ortsteil of Gemeinde Sylt
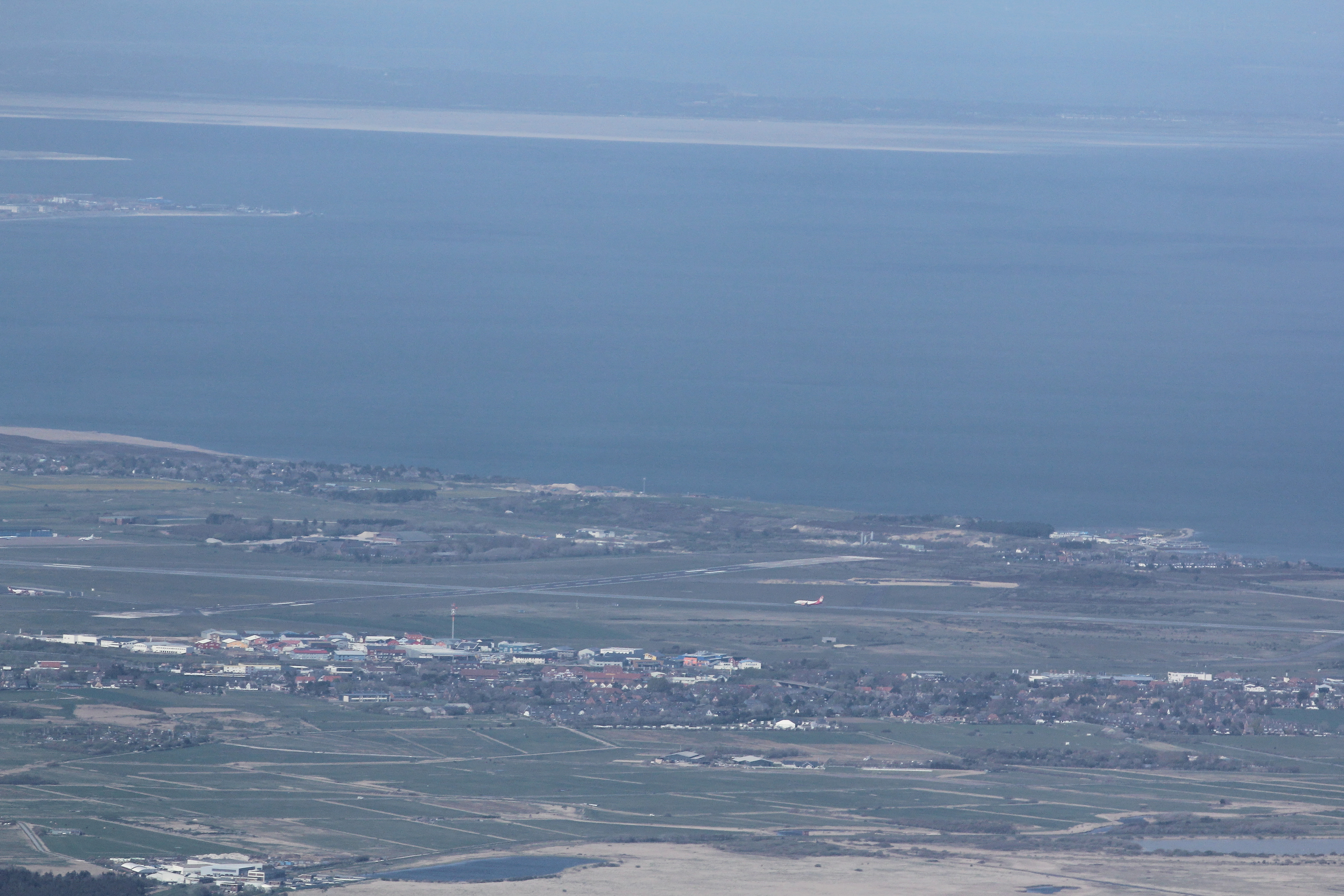
- Interactive map of Tinnum
- Location within Germany Location within Schleswig-Holstein
- Coordinates: 54°54′N 8°20′E
- Country: Germany
- State: Schleswig-Holstein
- District: Nordfriesland
- Town: Gemeinde Sylt
- Time zone: UTC+01:00 (CET)
  - Summer (DST): UTC+02:00 (CEST)
- Dialling codes: 04651
- Vehicle registration: NF
- Website: www.gemeinde-sylt.de

Tinnum (German pronunciation: [ˈtɪnʊm]; North Frisian: Tinem) is a village on the North Sea island of Sylt in the district of Nordfriesland in Schleswig-Holstein, Germany. Today, it is an Ortsteil of the Gemeinde Sylt.

== Etymology ==
The meaning of Tinnum (North Frisian: Tinem) is unclear. It may derive from teninge, an Old Frisian word for "enclosure". Alternatively, it may mean "home of Tinne".

== History ==
In the marshes southwest of the village lies the so-called Tinnumburg, a circular rampart on a site that shows sign of human use going back 2,000 years. Local tradition holds that Thing meetings used to be held near burial mounds to the north of the village (now removed to make way for the airport). Tynnum was first mentioned in a document in 1462. In 1613, there were 34 land owners. In 1649, the Landvogtei was constructed - the seat of the Vogt, the local representative of the liege lord. Tinnum remained the seat of the Vogt of Sylt until 1868. The first (private) school was built in Tinnum in 1659. In 1665, there were 55 taxable homes, including a newly constructed mill. In 1770, there were 88 houses, but that number was reduced by the great flood of 1825 to 72 (252 inhabitants). In 1837, the prison for Sylt was built here and Tinnum became the seat of the Amtsgericht (local court), until it was moved to Westerland in 1904. In 1838, a school of navigation moved to Tinnum.

By 1890, there were 72 houses with 347 inhabitants. Tinnum was connected to the Westerland electricity grid in 1925. In the 1920s, Tinnum was the source of much of the earth used in construction of the Hindenburgdamm. From 1927 until 1930, Tinnum had a station on the newly built Westerland-Niebüll railway line. Tinnum's vicinity to Westerland and its central location near the railway line resulted in industrial estates and warehouses being constructed in the village, changing its rural appearance, especially following World War II.

== Geography ==
The centre of Tinnum is located circa 4 kilometres southeast of the centre of Westerland. The total area of the Ortsteil is around 751 hectares.

== Demographics ==
Tinnum has a population of around 3,100 (2013).

== Economy ==
Today, tourism dominates the local economy. The business park areas along the K117 road play an important role in servicing both the tourism industry and the general Sylt economy. There are also several large scale retail businesses.

A dairy closed in 1996. Since 1960, Tinnum has held the status of Luftkurort (climatic spa).

== Attractions ==
=== Tinnumburg ===
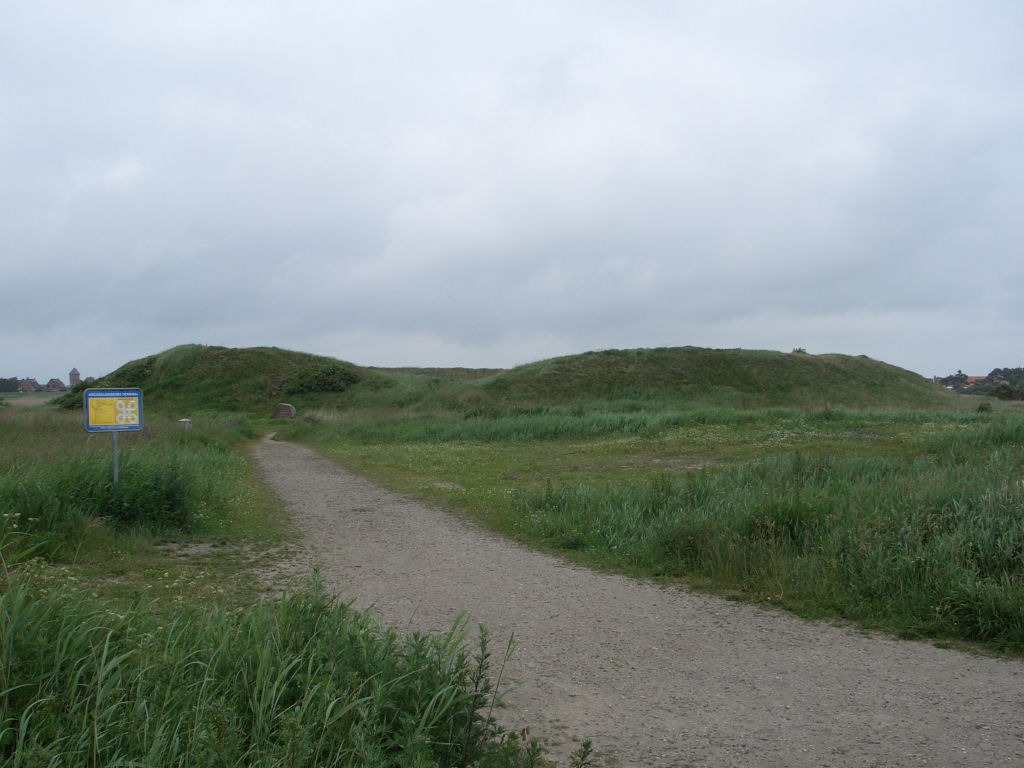
Tinnumburg

Tinnumburg: an aerial view

The site today called Tinnumburg has yielded findings dating back around 2,000 years. It likely served as a pagan cult site at that point. After a lapse of several hundred years, the currently visible earthen ramparts (remaining height up to 8 metres, depth up to 20 metres, diameter 120 metres) were built. During the Viking Age, the structure was used to protect dwellings. A 1976 excavation found the remains of prehistoric hearth sites and earthen huts.

In the 18th century, a Landvogt had the site "excavated" and one of the walls pierced. In the 19th century, farmers used the site as a watering place for cattle. Trenches dug during World War II were later filled in.

=== Others ===
A small zoo has been in operation since 1963, showing around 300 species.

== Government ==
With the Gebietsreform of 1970, the village of Tinnum became an Ortsteil of Sylt-Ost. Sylt-Ost was merged on 1 January 2009 with Rantum and the town of Westerland. In separate referendums in 2008, Westerland (by a large majority) and Sylt-Ost (narrowly) agreed to the merger in May 2008. Rantum followed. In September 2008, the merger contract was signed.

Tinnum is now an Ortsteil of Gemeinde Sylt. Since 1 May 2015, the mayor of Gemeinde Sylt has been Nikolas Häckel.

== Infrastructure ==
=== Transport ===
The K117 road connects Tinnum to Keitum and Westerland. Sylter Verkehrsgesellschaft operates buses that provide public transport on the island.

Sylt Airport is located immediately to the north of the village. However, the terminal is on the western side of the airfield, near Westerland.
