= Sylt-Ost =

- Municipality
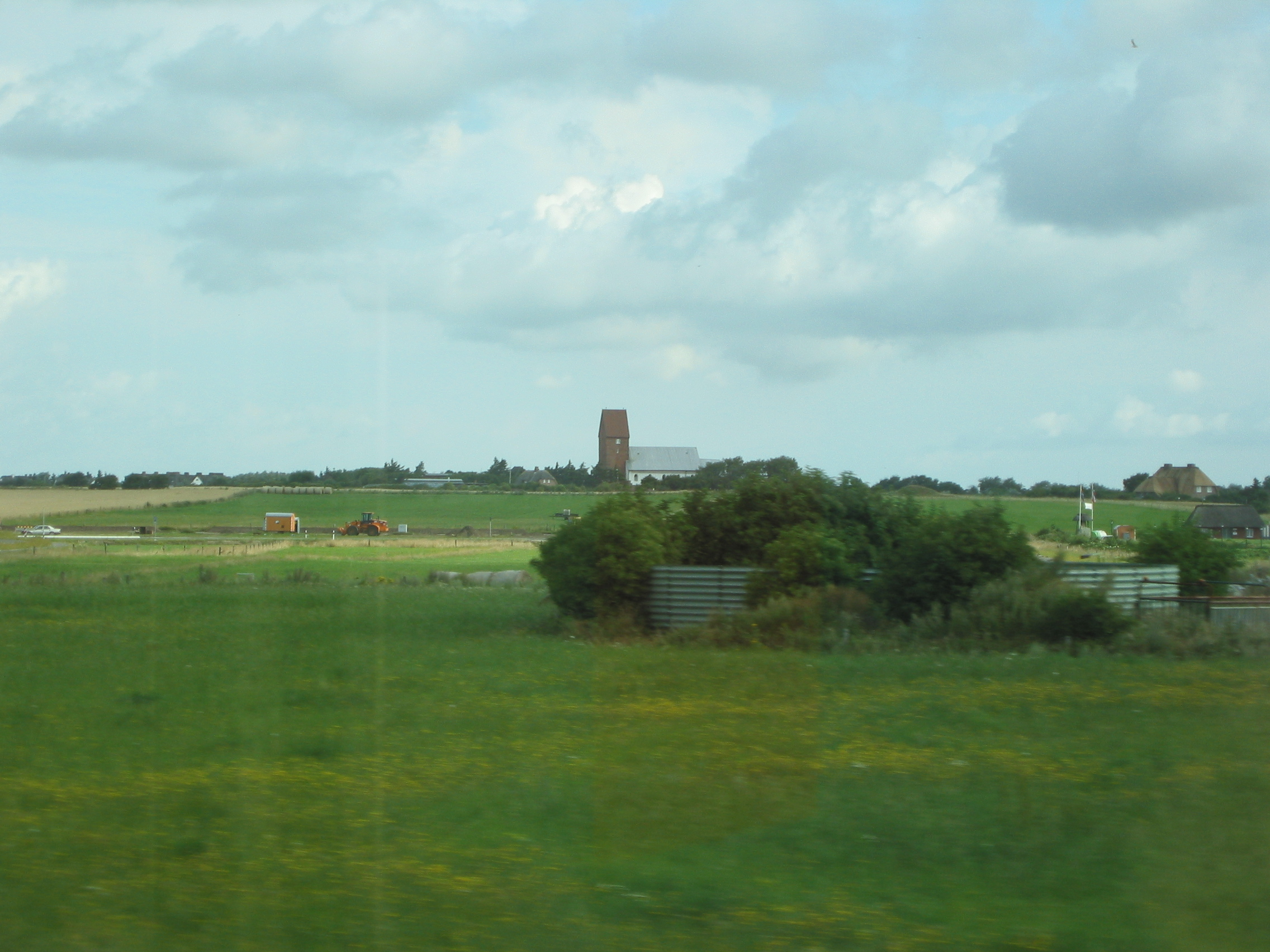
- St. Severin in Keitum

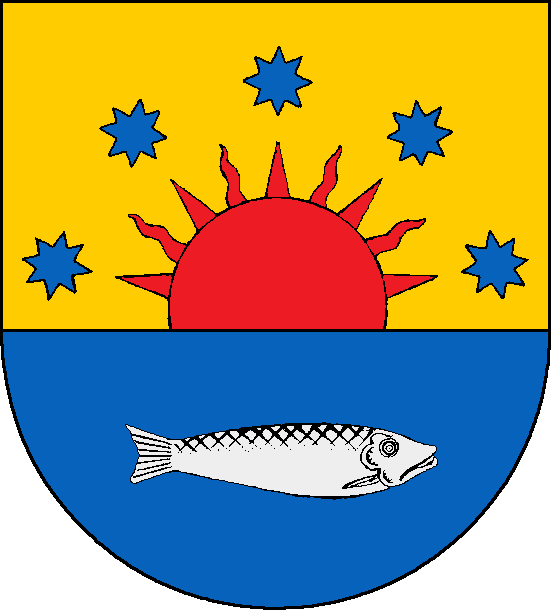
- Coat of arms

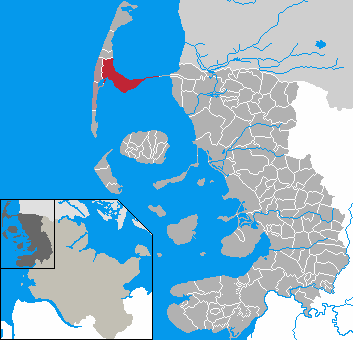
- Location of Sylt-Ost within the Nordfriesland district
- Interactive map of Sylt-Ost
- Location within Germany Location within Schleswig-Holstein
- Coordinates: 54°52′N 08°22′E
- Country: Germany
- State: Schleswig-Holstein
- District: Nordfriesland
- Disbanded: 1 January 2009

Area
  - Total: 37.97 km^{2} (14.66 sq mi)
- Elevation: 1 m (3.3 ft)

Population (2007-12-31)
  - Total: 5,833
  - Density: 153.6/km^{2} (397.9/sq mi)
- Time zone: UTC+01:00 (CET)
  - Summer (DST): UTC+02:00 (CEST)
- Postal codes: 25980
- Dialling codes: 04651
- Vehicle registration: NF
- Website: www.gemeinde-sylt.de

Sylt-Ost (German pronunciation: [ˌzʏltˈʔɔst], "East Sylt"; Danish: Sild Øst) is a former municipality on the island of Sylt, in the district of Nordfriesland, in Schleswig-Holstein, Germany. It used to be the administrative seat of the Amt Landschaft Sylt and a municipality into which a number of villages had been amalgamated in 1970. However, following a referendum in May 2008, Sylt-Ost merged with Westerland and Rantum to form the collective municipality Gemeinde Sylt which was created on 1 January 2009. Since 2009, the seat of the Amt Landschaft Sylt has been in Westerland.

== Subdivision ==
The former municipality "Sylt-Ost" was created from five villages in 1970:

- Archsum
- Keitum
- Morsum
- Munkmarsch (previously an Ortsteil of Keitum)
- Tinnum

The five villages are now Ortsteile of Gemeinde Sylt.

== Politics ==
=== Mayors ===
- 1986-1996: Heinz Maurus, CDU
- 1996-2005: Ingbert Liebing, CDU
- 2005-2008: Christoph Schmatloch, CDU
- 2008: Erik Kennel

=== Arms ===
Blazon: Per fess low or and azure. Above a sun rising in his splendour gules, accompanied by five eight-pointed mullets azure. Below a herring argent swimming to the left.

The coat of arms was designed by a Sylt artist and granted in 2002. The five mullets (stars) in it symbolise the villages of the municipality. The herring is meant to depict the former importance of fishery for the area, it was already used as the seal of the Sylt bailiffs in the 17th century. The colours are the traditional North Frisian colours which are also reflected in the island's national costume.

== Economy ==
The most important factor of income in the area is tourism, which nowadays completely dominates the Sylt economy. Having been the most important sector prior to the arrival of the tourist business, agriculture today plays a minor role.
