= Morsum =

- Ortsteil of Gemeinde Sylt
- Interactive map of Morsum
- Location within Germany Location within Schleswig-Holstein
- Coordinates: 54°52′N 8°25′E
- Country: Germany
- State: Schleswig-Holstein
- District: Nordfriesland
- Town: Gemeinde Sylt

Government
  - Mayor: Nikolas Häckel "Gemeinde Sylt"
- Time zone: UTC+01:00 (CET)
  - Summer (DST): UTC+02:00 (CEST)
- Dialling codes: 04651
- Vehicle registration: NF
- Website: www.gemeinde-sylt.de

Morsum (German pronunciation: [ˈmɔʁzʊm]; North Frisian: Muasem) is a village on the North Sea island of Sylt in the district of Nordfriesland in Schleswig-Holstein, Germany. Today, it is an Ortsteil of the Gemeinde Sylt. Morsum is located close to the scientifically important geotope Morsum-Kliff and to the beginning of the Hindenburgdamm linking Sylt with the mainland.

== Etymology ==
Morsum (North Frisian: Muasem) derives from "settlement of Mar".

== History ==
Morsum was first mentioned in a document of 1462 (Zinsbuch of the Bistum Schleswig). Until the 19th century, it was the most populous village on Sylt. In 1695, Morsum had 118 taxable dwellings. A school house was built in 1705. In 1927, Morsum was connected to the railway on the Niebüll-Westerland line.

== Geography ==
Morsum is a Ringdorf located on the Wadden Sea side of the island of Sylt. Morsum is the easternmost village on Sylt and consists of the sub-villages Abort (North Frisian: Abuurt), Groß-Morsum (North Frisian: Gurtmuasem, Danish: Store Morsum), Klein-Morsum (North Frisian: Litjmuasem, Danish: Lille Morsum), Holm (North Frisian: Holerem, Danish: Holmen), Klampshörn (North Frisian: Klaampshörn), Nösse (North Frisian: Nösi, Danish: Næsodde), Osterende (North Frisian: Uasterjen, Danish: Østerende), Schellinghörn (North Frisian: Skelinghör, Danish: Skellinghjørne ) and Wall (North Frisian: Val, Danish: Vold). The total area is around 1,164 hectares. Morsum is located at the transition between higher lying geest and the low-lying marshes that, until the Nössedeich was constructed in 1936/37, were constantly threatened with flooding. Northeast of the village lies the Morsum-Kliff (see below).

== Demographics ==
Morsum has around 1,160 inhabitants (2013). The use of the local dialect, Söl'ring is still more prevalent in Morsum than in other parts of the island.

== Economy ==
Agriculture has always been more important in Morsum than in the other villages on Sylt. Today, like elsewhere on Sylt, tourism is the dominant industry. Since 1958, Morsum has held the status of Luftkurort (climatic spa). There are many traditional Uthland-Frisian houses and a number of craftspeople and galleries have established themselves in the village.

== Attractions ==
=== St. Martin ===
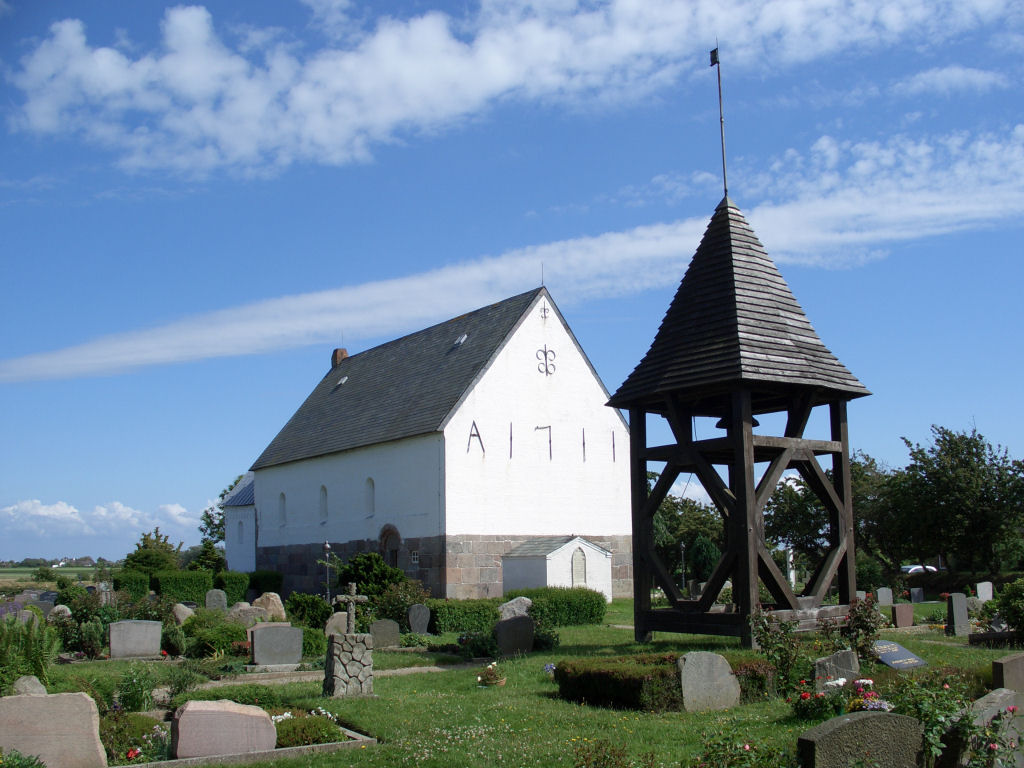
St. Martin

The Romanesque church St. Martin is located a bit outside of the village centre on a slight elevation in the marshes. It was built in the early 13th century and thus, with St. Severin at Keitum, is one of the oldest surviving church buildings on Sylt. During the Thirty Years War, the church was turned into a fortified church. St. Martin has no steeple or tower. The wooden bell tower is separate from the church building itself, sitting in the grave yard.

St. Martin features a 13th-century baptismal font and a 17th-century oaken pulpit.

Today, St. Martin is a Protestant church.

=== Morsum-Kliff ===
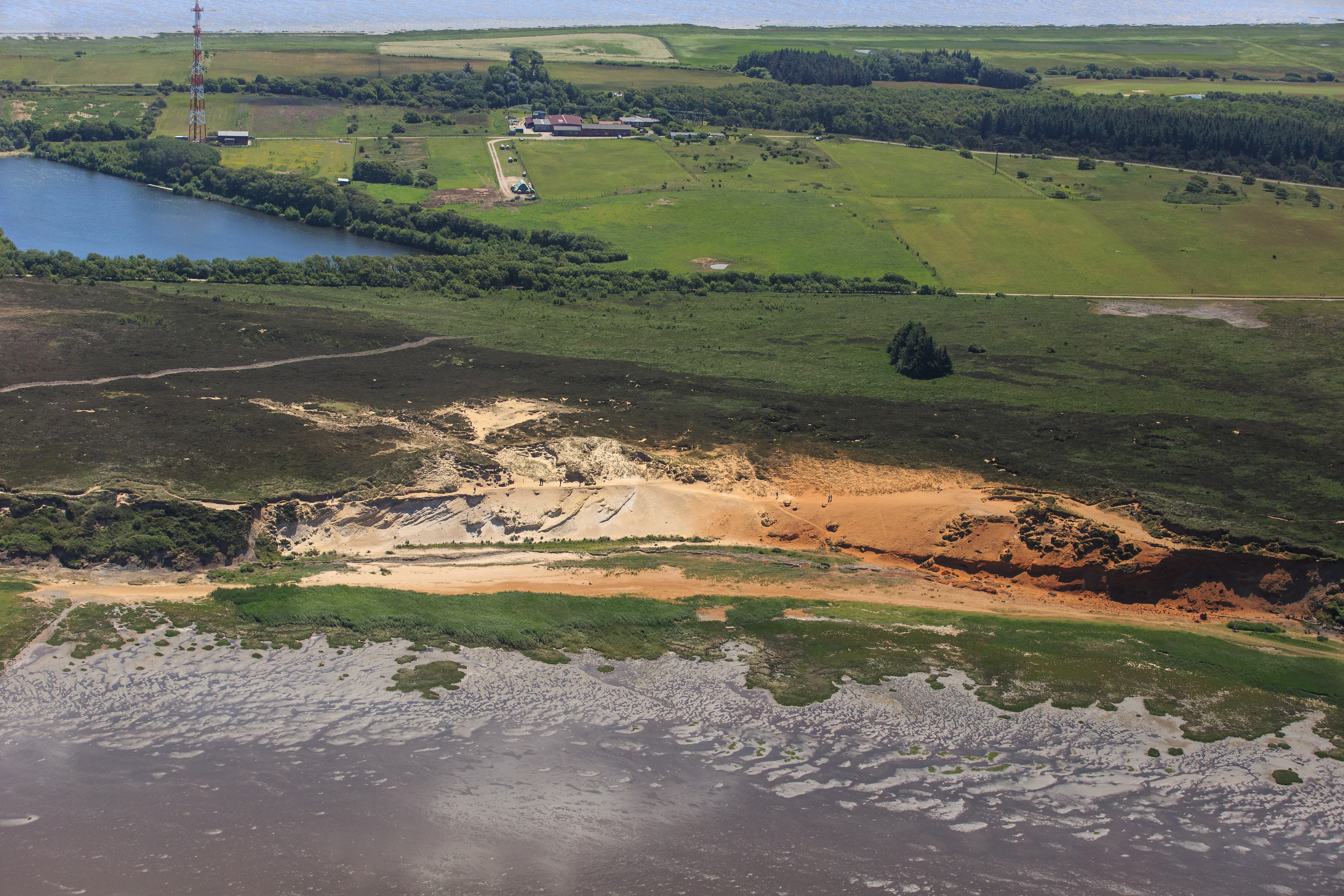
Morsum-Kliff

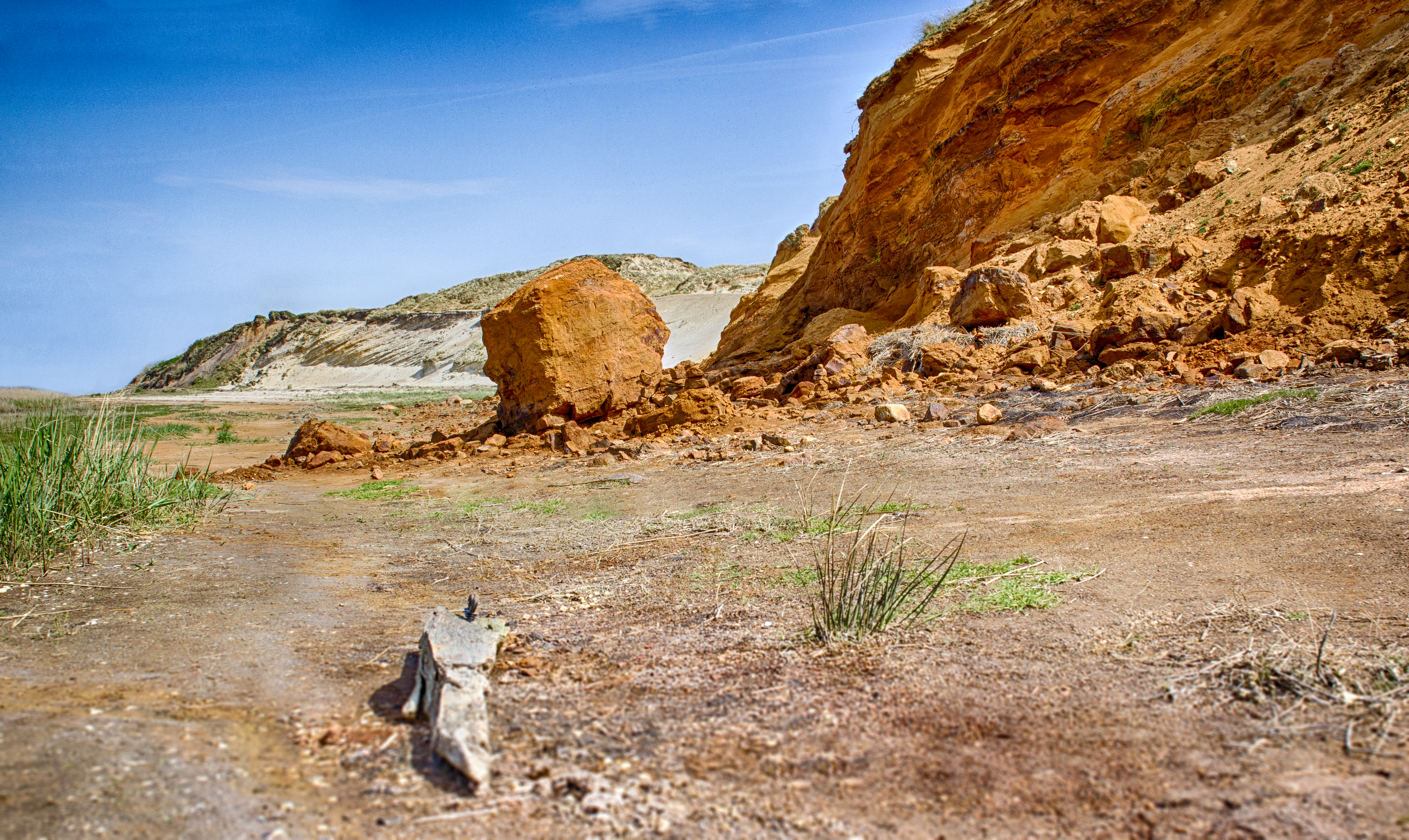
Morsum-Kliff

Morsum-Kliff has been described as "one of the most important geological monuments in Germany". It stretches for around 1.8 kilometres along the northeastern coast and rises to a height of up to 21 metres. The Kliff is made up of various layers of soil:

- gray-black Glimmerton dating back 5 to 7 million years and including fossils such as snails, mussels and crabs
- reddish Limonite dating back 4 to 5 million years
- white Kaolin sands deposited here 2 to 3 million years ago from Scandinavia and containing fossilised corals, sea lilies and sponges (dead for around 500 million years).

These three layers were originally on top of each other but about 15,000 years ago during the ice age they were compressed and folded by glacial activity, so that in places they are now horizontally next to each other.

The Kliff and the nearby heath-covered area (around 43 hectares) have been a nature preserve since 1923. This prevented the planned use of the sand deposits in construction of the Hindenburgdamm. In 2006, the Kliff was declared a Nationaler Geotop (national geotope).

In the past there have been several attempts to mine the cliff. In the 1870s, Ludwig Meyn bought local properties to operate an iron mine here. He planned to use the mining waste in the construction of a causeway to the mainland. However, the soil did not contain sufficient iron ore for the scheme to be implemented. In the 1930s, the Nazi government took an interest in the local iron ore deposits, but by the beginning of World War II no thorough prospection and evaluation had taken place. Another attempt was undertaken during the 1950s, when businesses were looking for a supply of rare ores such as titanium for the resurgent German economy.

Currently, the Kliff is threatened by erosion made worse by visitors or fossil hunters leaving the designated paths.

==== The Morsum-Kliff in painting ====
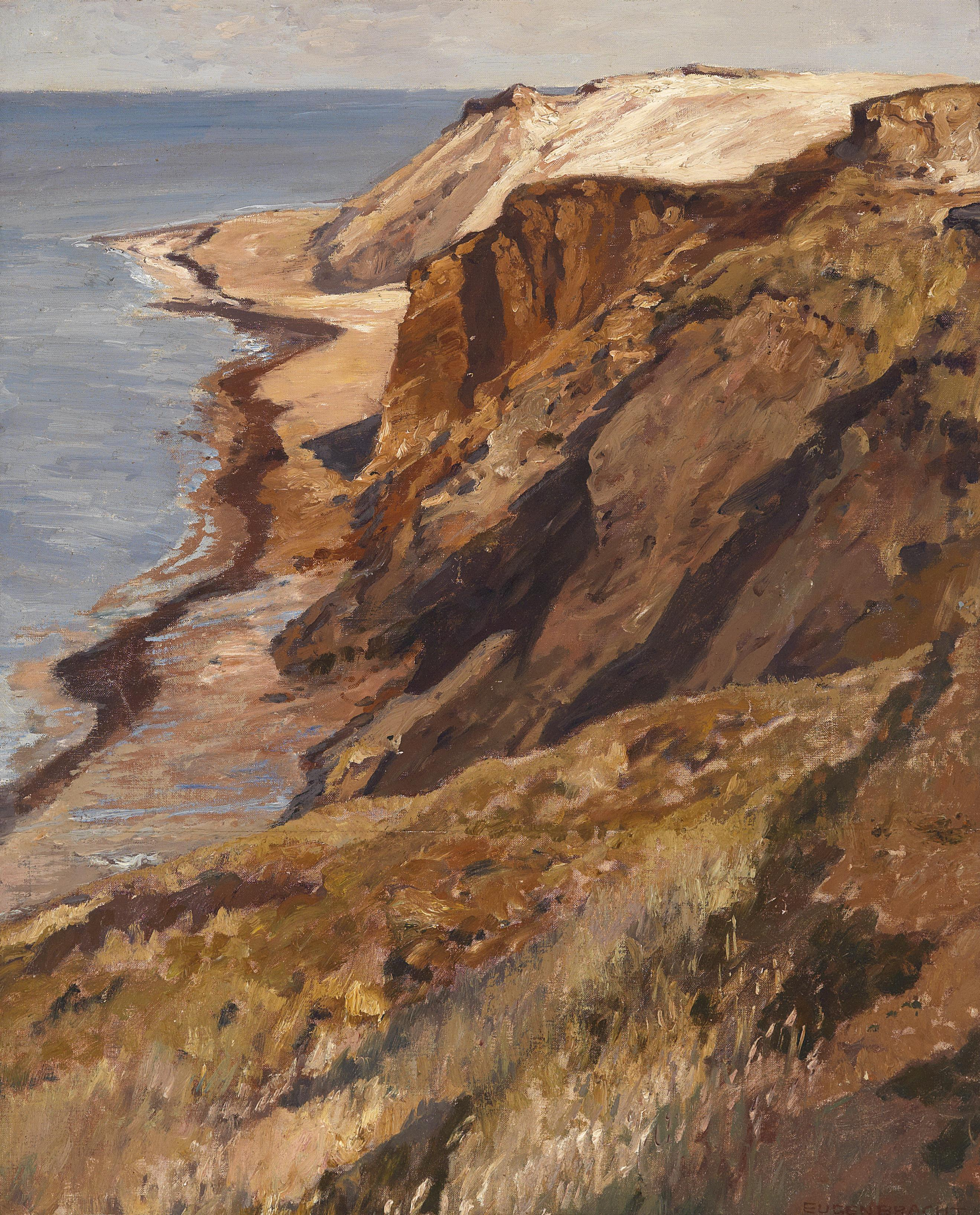
Eugen Bracht Küste auf Sylt (Morsum-Kliff), oil painting, 1897

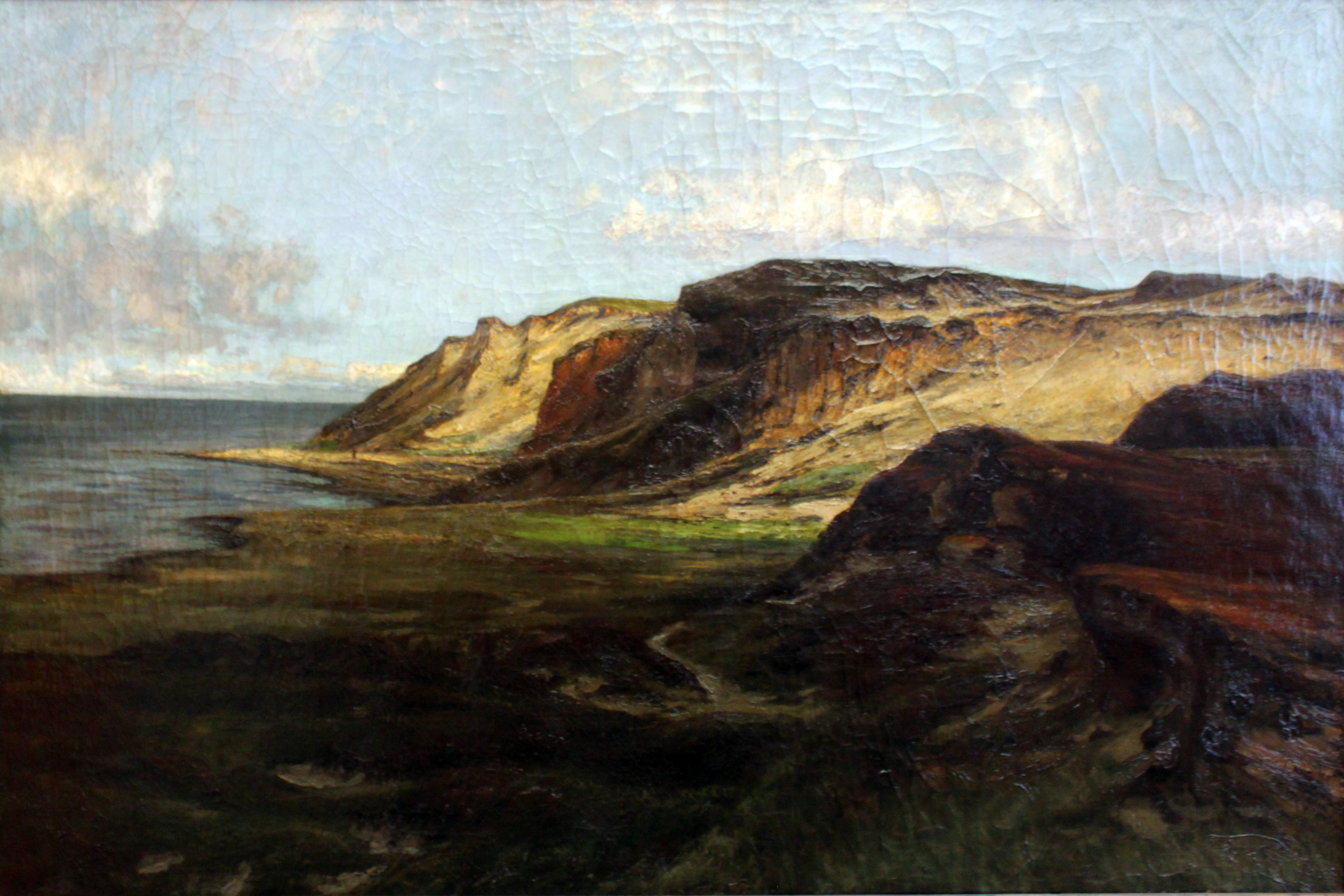
Hinrich Wrage Morsumkliff, Sylt, oil painting, 1902

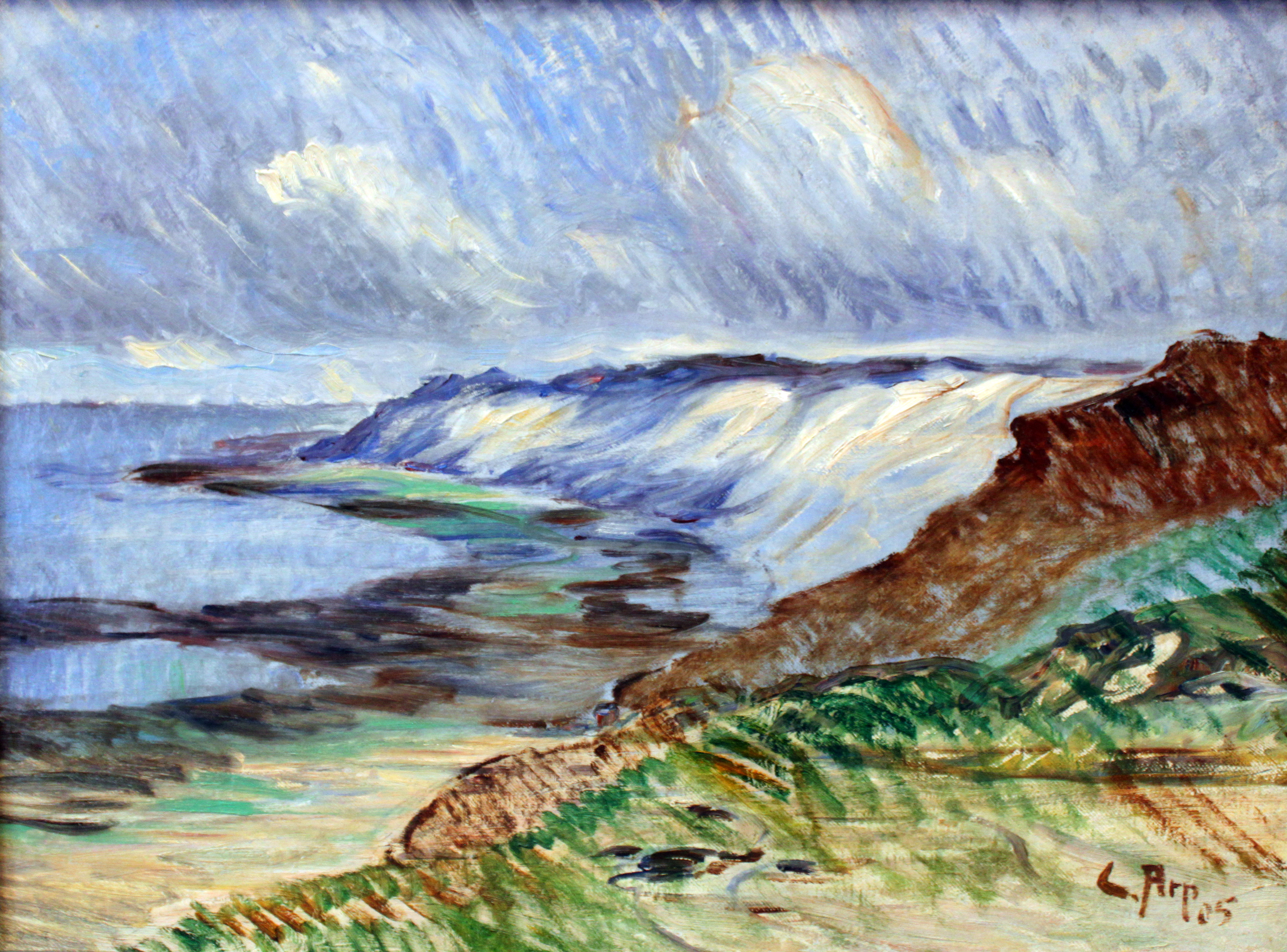
Carl Arp Küstenlandschaft auf Sylt (Morsumkliff)‚ oil painting, 1905

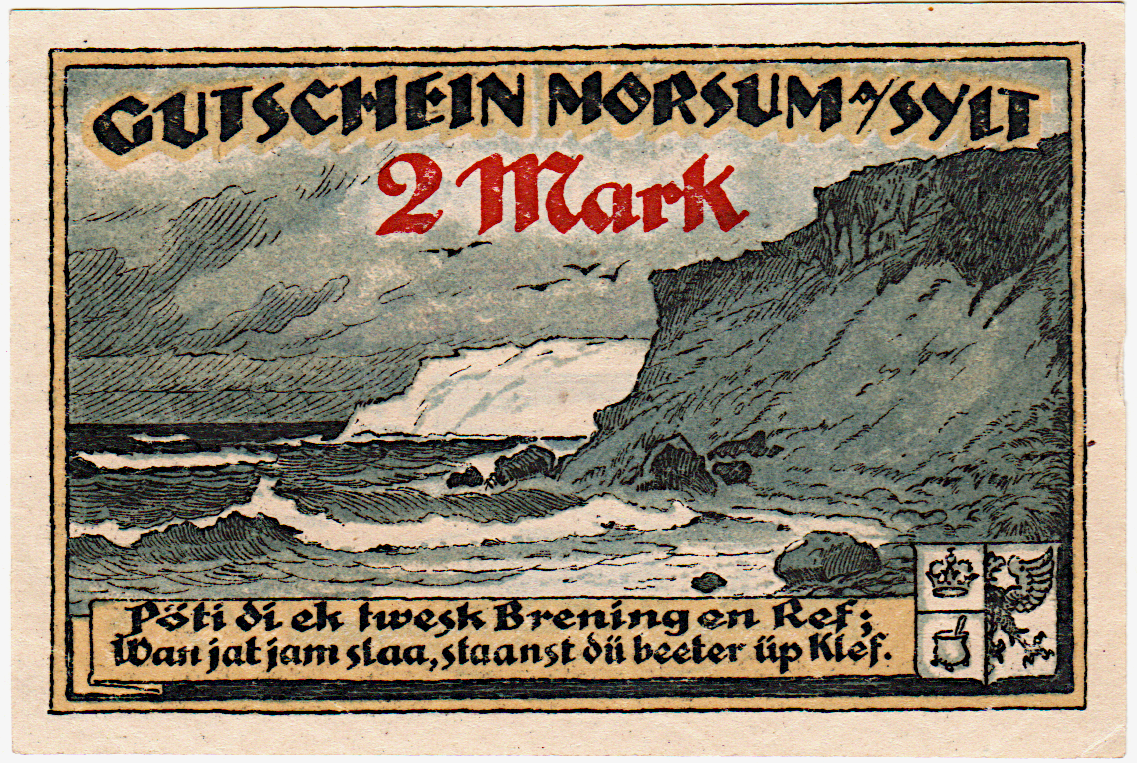
The Morsum-Kliff (artist unknown) on a Notgeld banknote from 1921

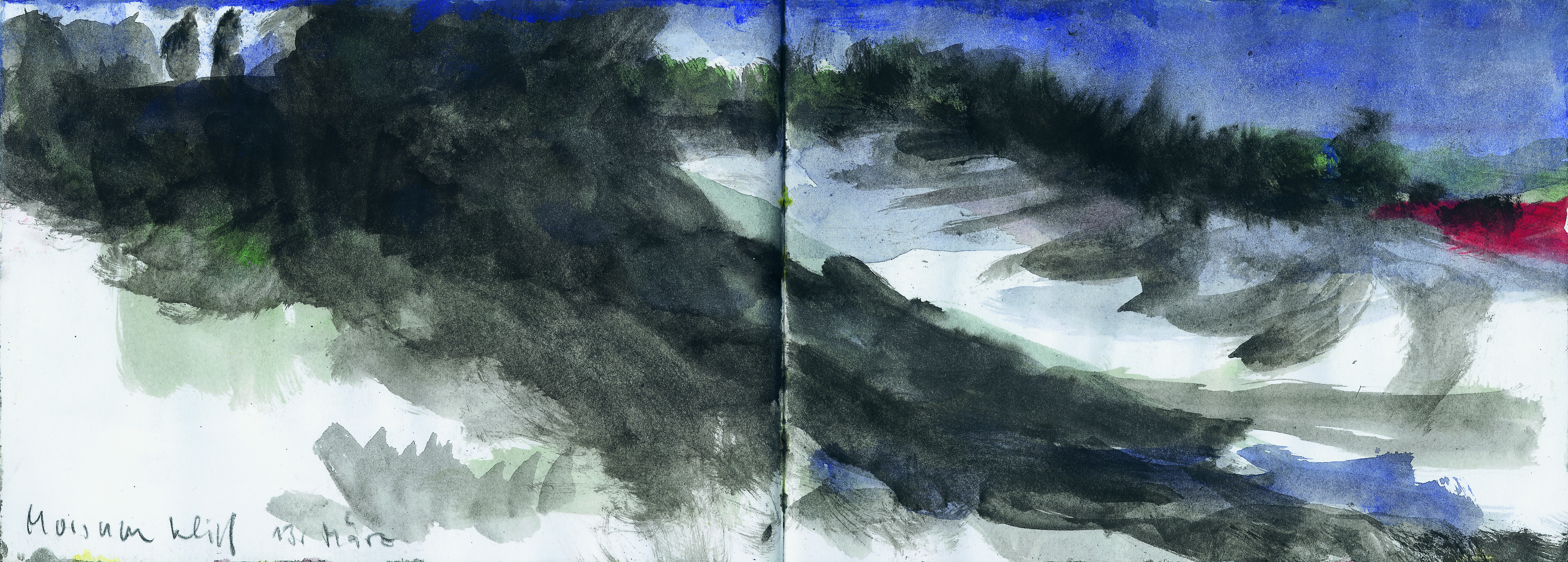
Ingo Kühl Morsum Kliff, watercolor, sketchbook, 2003

=== Further attractions ===
The area around Morsum features a large number of prehistoric tumuli and other sites. In addition, the only extant burial mound on Sylt dating from the Viking Age is located on Morsum's territory.

These monuments make up the "largest burial mound site in Germany" and include the Bronze Age burial mounds known as Munkhoog and Markmannhoog.

== Government ==
In the Gebietsreform of 1970, Morsum became part of Sylt-Ost. Prior to that, the sub-villages had been Ortsteile of the municipality Morsum. Sylt-Ost was merged on 1 January 2009 with Rantum and the town of Westerland. In separate referendums in 2008, Westerland (by a large majority) and Sylt-Ost (narrowly) agreed to the merger in May 2008. Rantum followed. In September 2008, the merger contract was signed.

Morsum is now an Ortsteil of Gemeinde Sylt. Since 1 May 2015, the mayor of Gemeinde Sylt has been Nikolas Häckel.

== Infrastructure ==
=== Transport ===
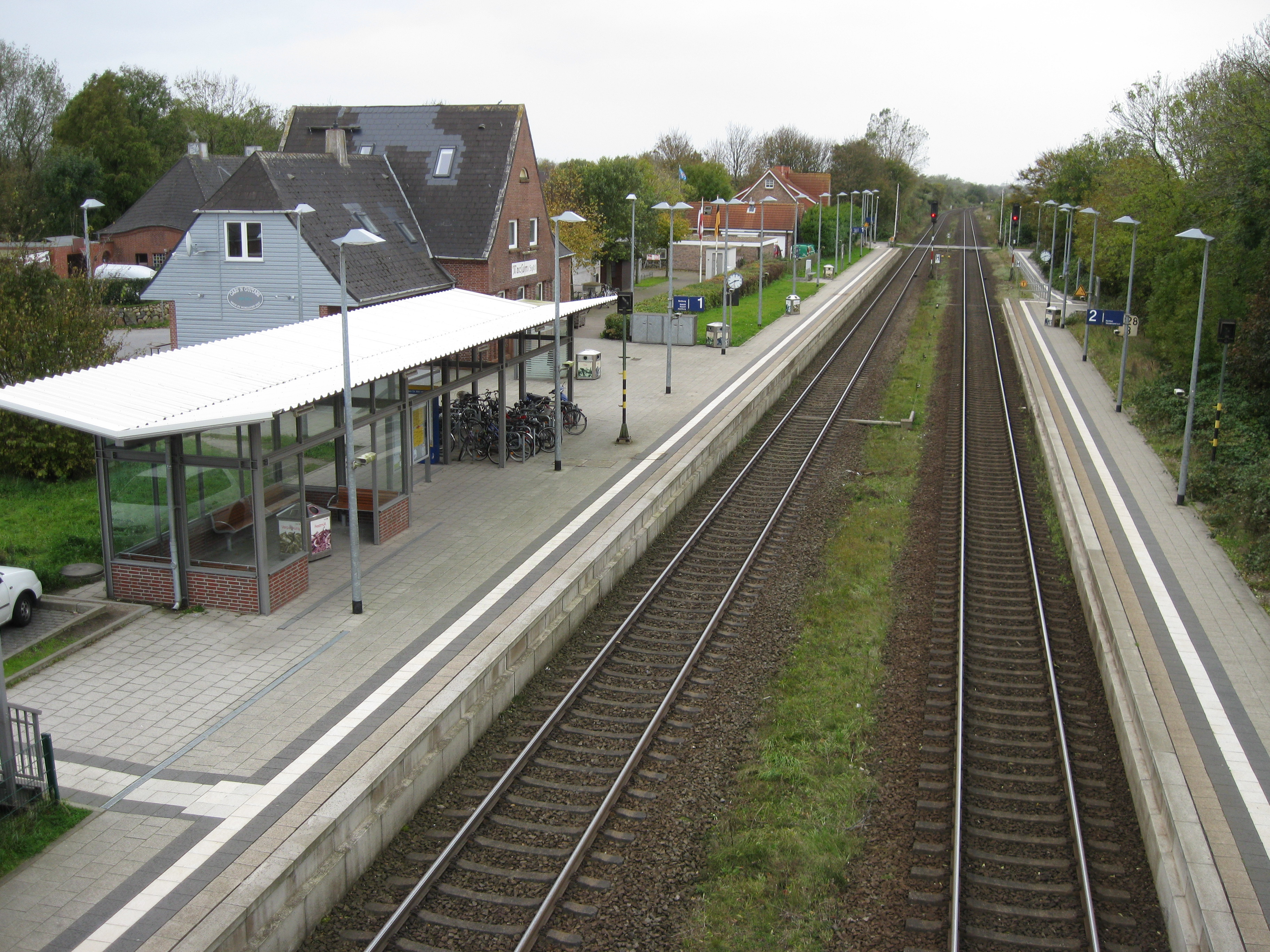
Morsum station

Morsum has a railway station on the line between Westerland and Niebüll. However, long-distance trains and the Sylt Shuttle do not stop there. However, local services by Nord-Ostsee-Bahn stop at Morsum station. So there are direct connections to Hamburg-Altona, Husum or Niebüll for example.

Morsum is where the Hindenburgdamm and its railway line connects the island of Sylt with the mainland.

The K117 road connects Morsum to Keitum and Westerland. Sylter Verkehrsgesellschaft operates buses that provide public transport on the island.

=== Other ===
The public broadcaster NDR operates an 80-metre radio antenna (Sender Morsum) outside of the village.
