= Sylt Airport =

Sylt Airport Flughafen Sylt

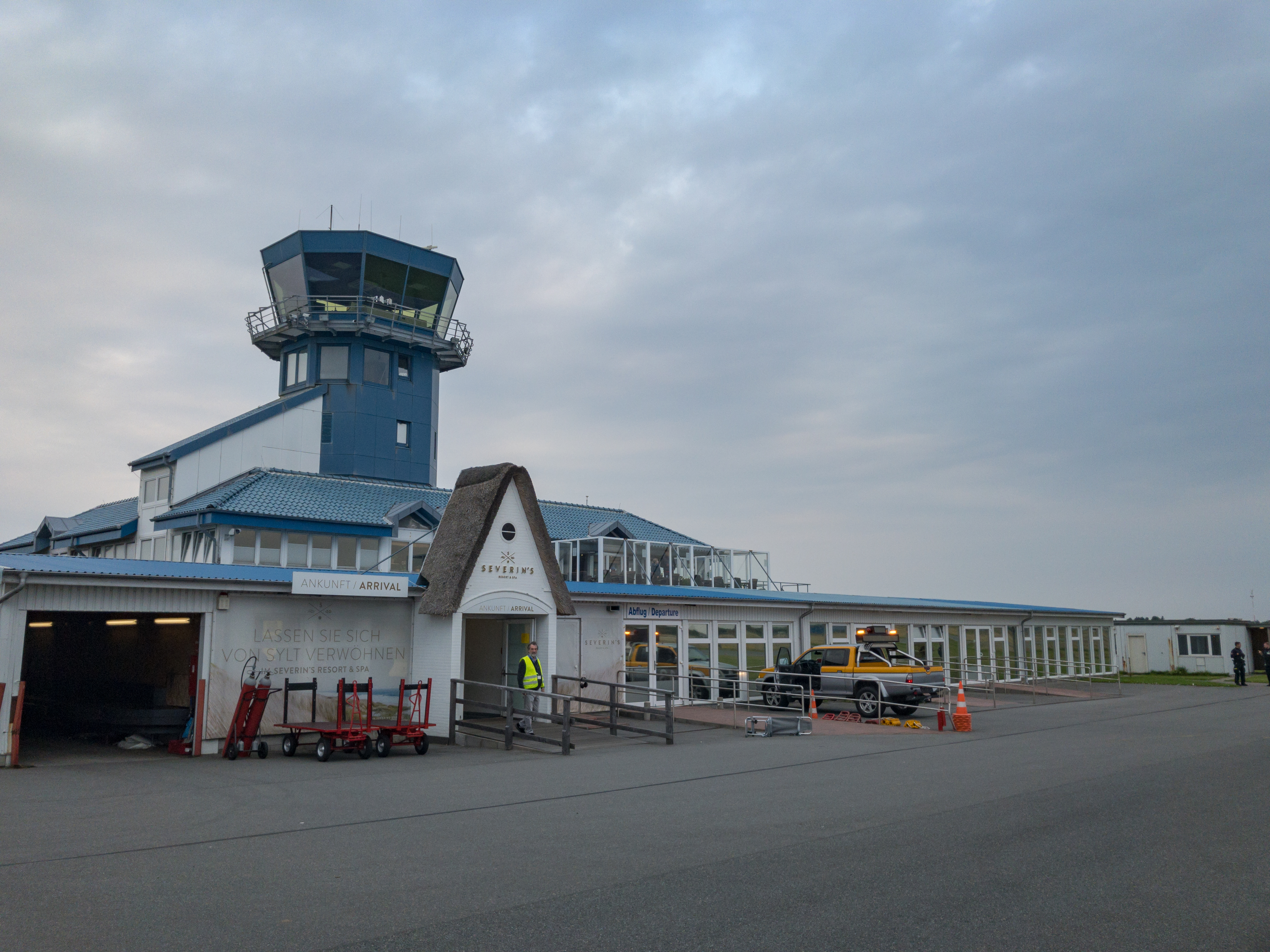
- IATA: GWT; ICAO: EDXW

Summary
- Airport type: Public
- Operator: Flughafen Sylt GmbH
- Serves: Sylt, Germany
- Elevation AMSL: 51 ft (16 m)
- Coordinates: 54°54′48″N 008°20′26″E
- Website: flughafen-sylt.de

Map
- Location of Sylt Airport in Schleswig-Holstein

Runways
Direction	Length		Surface
Direction	ft	m	Surface
06/24	5,564	1,696	Asphalt
14/32	6,955	2,120	Paved

Statistics (2022)
- Passengers: 119,763 ▲+17,4%
- Aircraft movements: 12,641 ▲+18,0%
- Cargo (metric tons): 0 0,0%
- Sources: Statistics at ADV. AIP at German air traffic control.

Sylt Airport (IATA: GWT, ICAO: EDXW) is an airport on the German island of Sylt, located in the municipality of the same name. It mostly features summer seasonal scheduled traffic to major German cities as well as general aviation and gliding. The airport is also referred to as Westerland/Sylt, referencing Westerland, a well-known part of the municipality of Sylt which, however, is not the nearest settlement to the airport.

== History ==
The island of Sylt was a famous destination for leisure and holidays in the early 20th century. Sylt's first small airport was established right after World War I, and in 1919 the first scheduled routes to Weimar, Hamburg and Berlin began. As Germany had lost the mainland port serving Sylt due to the Treaty of Versailles, the airport became an important way for travelers to avoid entering Denmark before the construction of the Hindenburgdamm, a causeway linking Sylt to mainland Germany by railway.

During World War II, the airport was significantly redeveloped and enlarged to serve as a military base. After the war, it became RAF Sylt and was used for weapons and other training until closure in late 1961. In the 1960s, leisure traffic returned, further developing from the 1970s onwards.

In 1990, Sylt Airport received new technical equipment as well as new passenger facilities. Today it is capable of handling medium-sized aircraft such as the Boeing 737.

In June 2015, Lufthansa CityLine announced the expansion of their services to Sylt: instead of being seasonal, flights from Frankfurt and Munich are now operated year-round. easyJet announced in April 2019 that they would launch weekly flights throughout the summer season to their base in Berlin.

== Airlines and destinations ==
The following airlines operate regular scheduled and charter flights at Sylt Airport:

Airlines	Destinations
Austrian Airlines	Seasonal: Vienna
Eurowings	Düsseldorf; Seasonal: Stuttgart
Lufthansa	Seasonal: Frankfurt, Munich
Luxair	Seasonal: Luxembourg
Swiss International Air Lines	Seasonal: Zürich

The nearest larger international airport is Billund Airport in Denmark, approx. 135 kilometres (84 mi) (by road) to the north. Hamburg Airport is approx. 220 kilometres (140 mi) to the south.

== Statistics ==
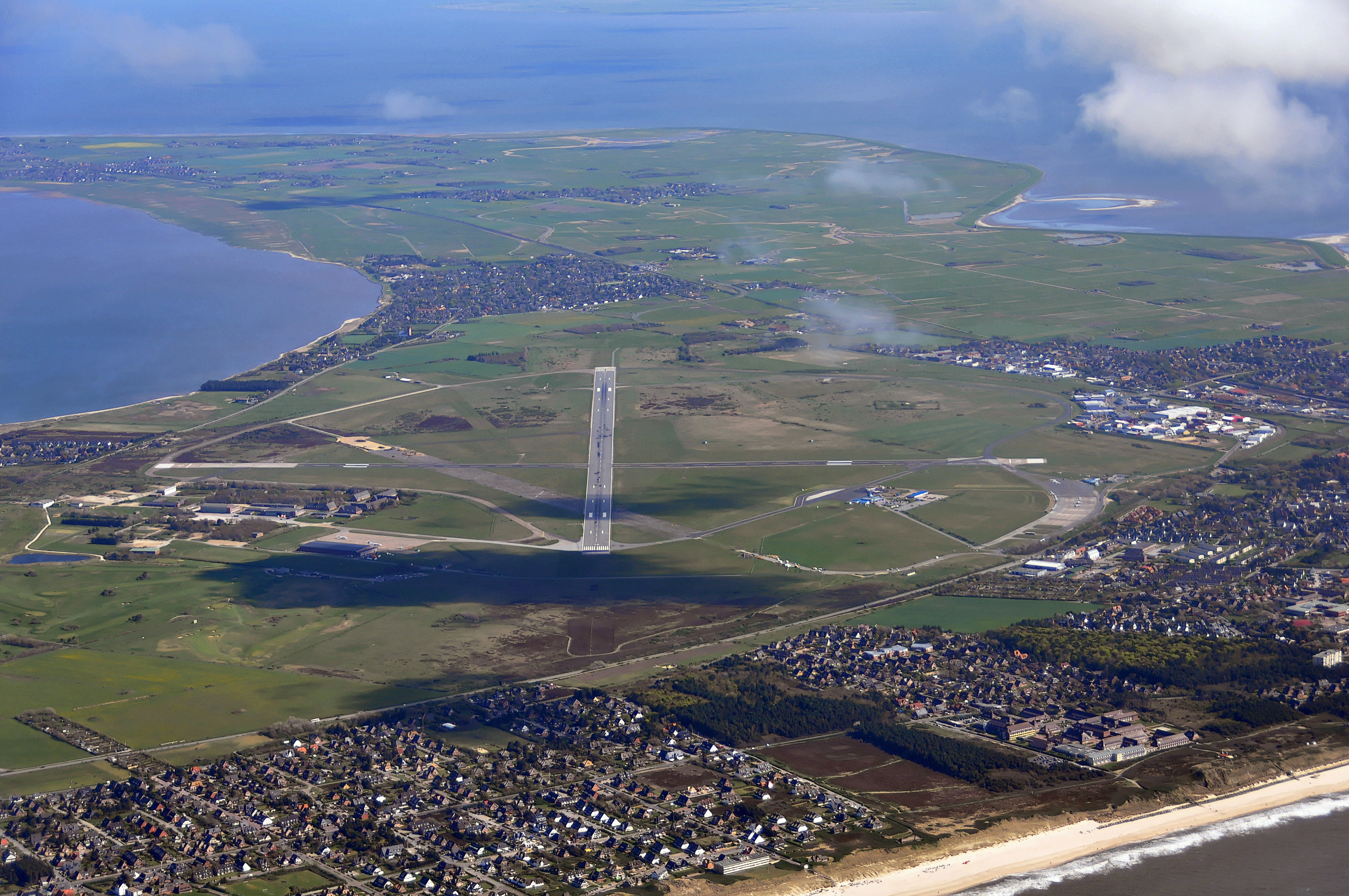
Aerial view of the airport and the Island's surroundings

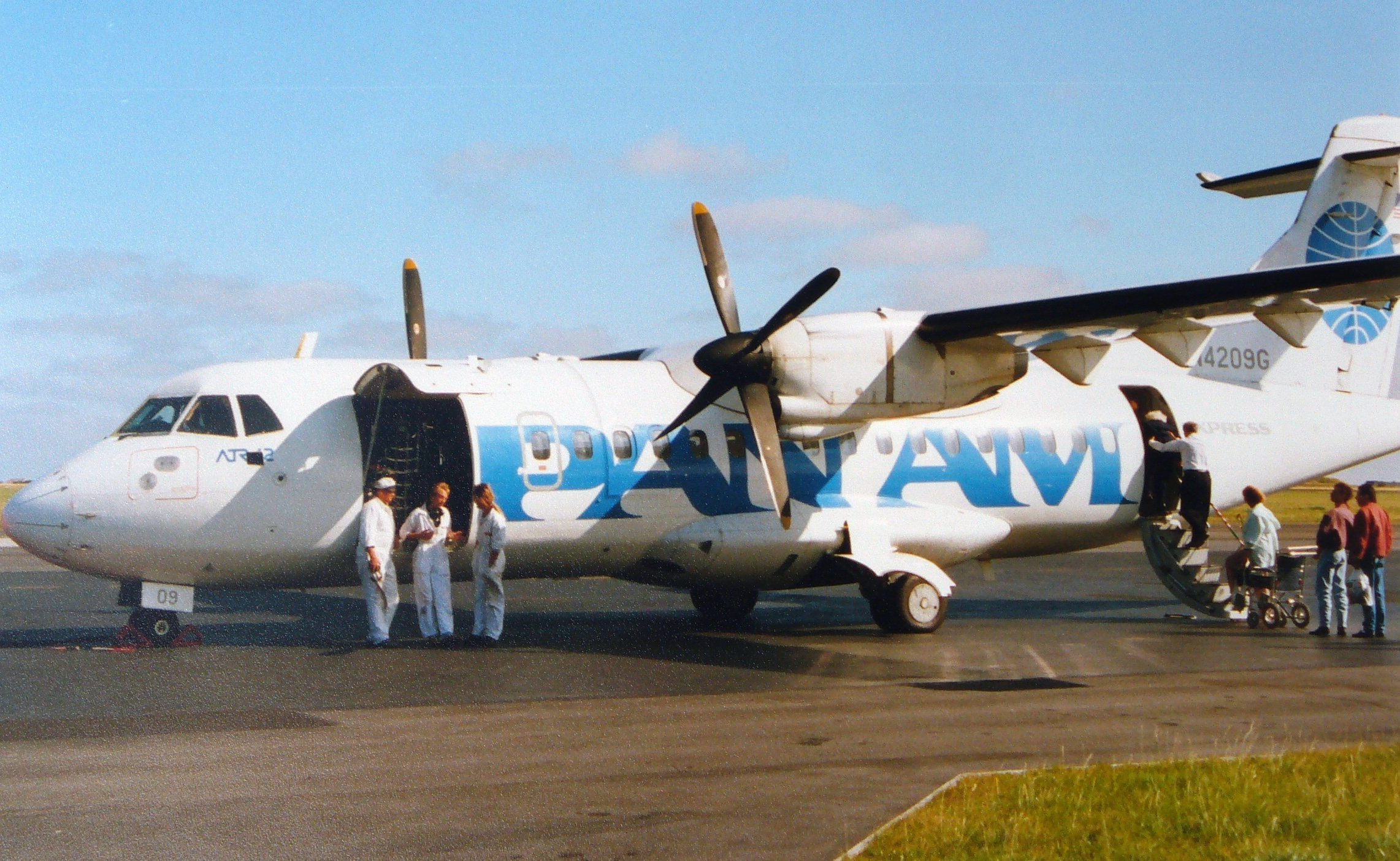
A former Pan Am Express aircraft at Sylt Airport in 1991

	Passengers
2010	210,000
2011	▲217,500
2012	▼176,000
2013	▼175,000
2015	unknown
2016	unknown
2017	unknown
2018	▲129,000
2019	▲140,000
2020	▼85,979
2021	▲101,991
2022	▲119,763

== See also ==
- Transport in Germany
- List of airports in Germany
