= Keitum =

- Ortsteil of Gemeinde Sylt
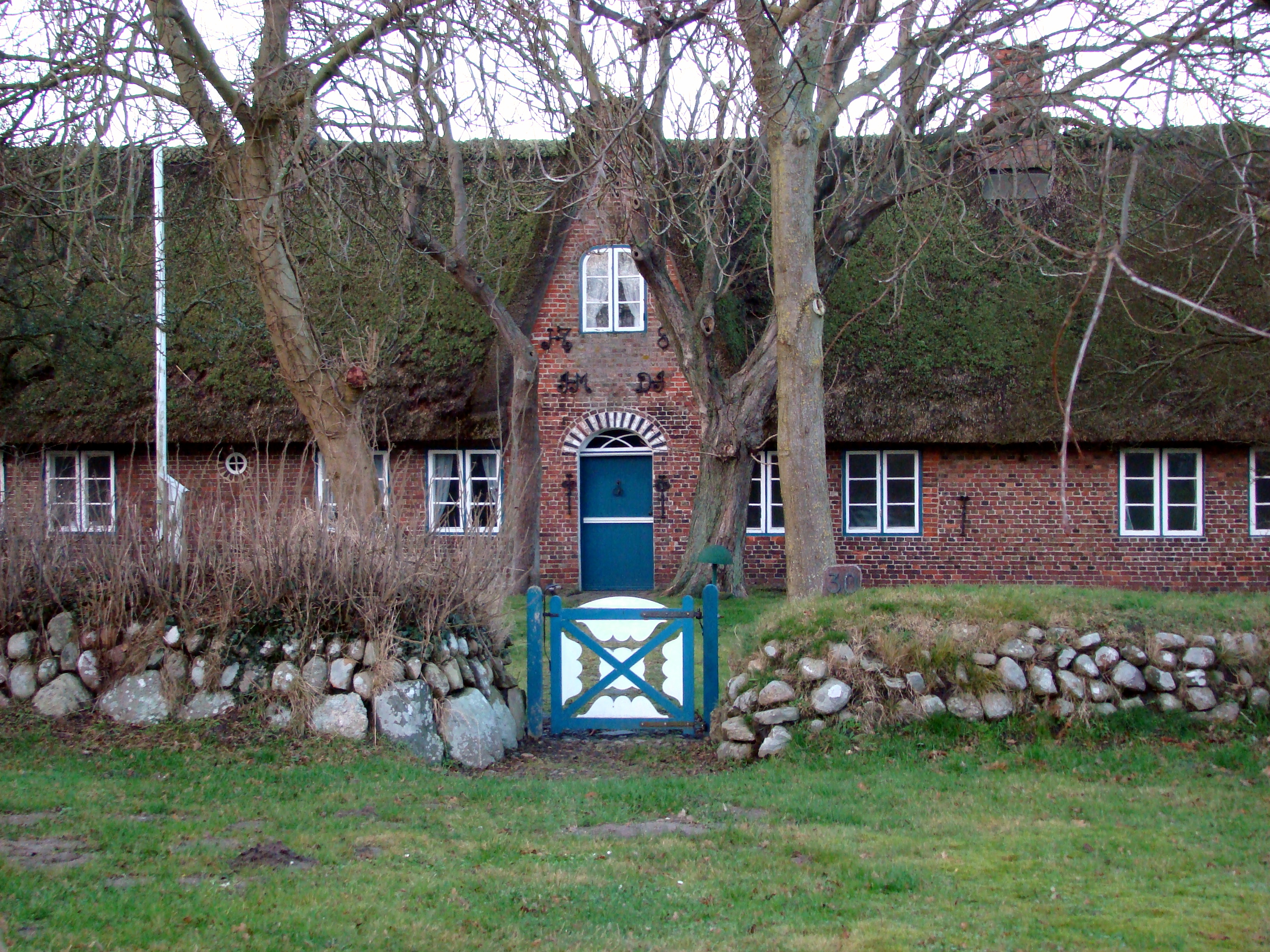
- 18th-century Friesenhaus in Keitum
- Interactive map of Keitum
- Location within Germany Location within Schleswig-Holstein
- Coordinates: 54°36′N 8°22′E
- Country: Germany
- State: Schleswig-Holstein
- District: Nordfriesland
- Town: Gemeinde Sylt
- Time zone: UTC+01:00 (CET)
  - Summer (DST): UTC+02:00 (CEST)
- Dialling codes: 04651
- Vehicle registration: NF
- Website: www.gemeinde-sylt.de

Keitum (German pronunciation: [ˈkaɪtʊm]; North Frisian: Kairem; Danish: Kejtum) is a village on the North Sea island of Sylt in the district of Nordfriesland in Schleswig-Holstein, Germany. Today, it is an Ortsteil of the Gemeinde Sylt.

== Etymology ==
It is unclear from what the name Keitum (Kairem in North Frisian, Kejtum in Danish) is derived. One theory posits that it used to refer to the "home of Kei" or "home of Keit". Alternatively, it could be based on "Heidum" (auf der Heide or "on the heath").

== History ==
"Keytum" was first mentioned in 1462. Until the end of the 19th century, Keitum was the most important town on the island of Sylt. Since 1612 it was the location of Sylt's largest mill. In 1695, the village had 78 houses. A school house was built in 1763. In 1820, the harbour was expanded. Although keeping the navigation channel open was a continuing problem, Keitum harbour was the main connection between Sylt and the mainland until around 1867. After 1859, the harbour silted up and the ferry traffic shifted to Munkmarsch. In 1860, Keitum had passed Morsum as the island's most populous village (with 785 inhabitants). In the 1890s, the tourist business moved increasingly to Westerland, sidelining the eastern villages. Although Keitum is located on the railway which connected Westerland with Niebüll via the Hindenburgdamm in 1927, most visitors disembarked only at the line's terminus, at Westerland.

== Geography ==
Keitum is located on the Wadden Sea side of the island. The village fronts on the sea at what is called the Grünes Kliff (green cliff), a mostly vegetation-covered (hence green) escarpment. It stretches along the coast for around 3 kilometres from the eastern edge of the village to the church of St. Severin, north of the village.

== Demographics ==
In 2013, Keitum had a permanent population of around 880. Another 900 people have second homes in the village.

== Economy ==
Like elsewhere on Sylt, tourism is a major industry. Since 1950, the village has held the status of Luftkurort (climatic spa). Keitum is known for its large number of traditional Uthland-Frisian houses, many of them over 200 years old, and its tree-lined avenues. Although the original elm trees died in the 1990s, they have been replaced by chestnut and linden trees. In addition, many craftspeople (like gold smiths, weavers and potters) are based in Keitum.

== Attractions ==
=== St. Severin ===
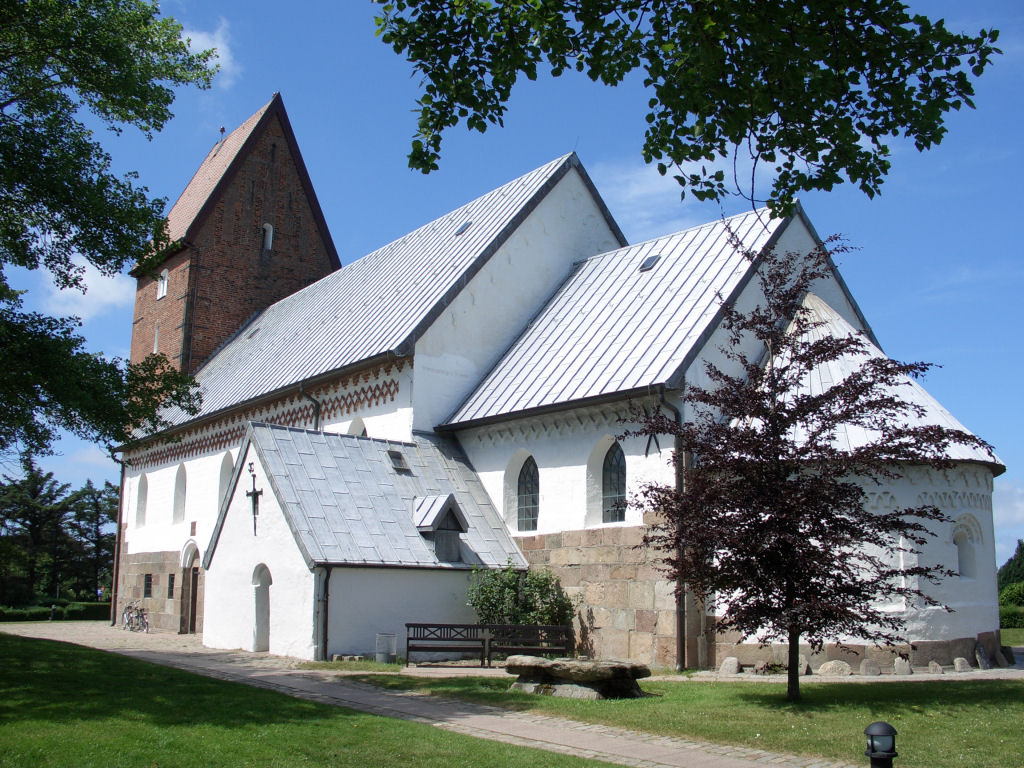
St. Severin

Originally built in the early 13th century, this Romanesque church is today thought to be the oldest in Schleswig-Holstein. It was originally dedicated to the saints Canute and Ketel, but later rededicated to Severin of Cologne.

The attached graveyard holds the graves of numerous important local families (especially whalers and other owners or masters of ships) and of some notable people: Rudolf Augstein, Gerhard Schröder, Uwe Dallmeier, Peter Suhrkamp and Ernst Mollenhauer. Several works of sculpture art have also been erected in the churchyard.

=== Harhoog ===
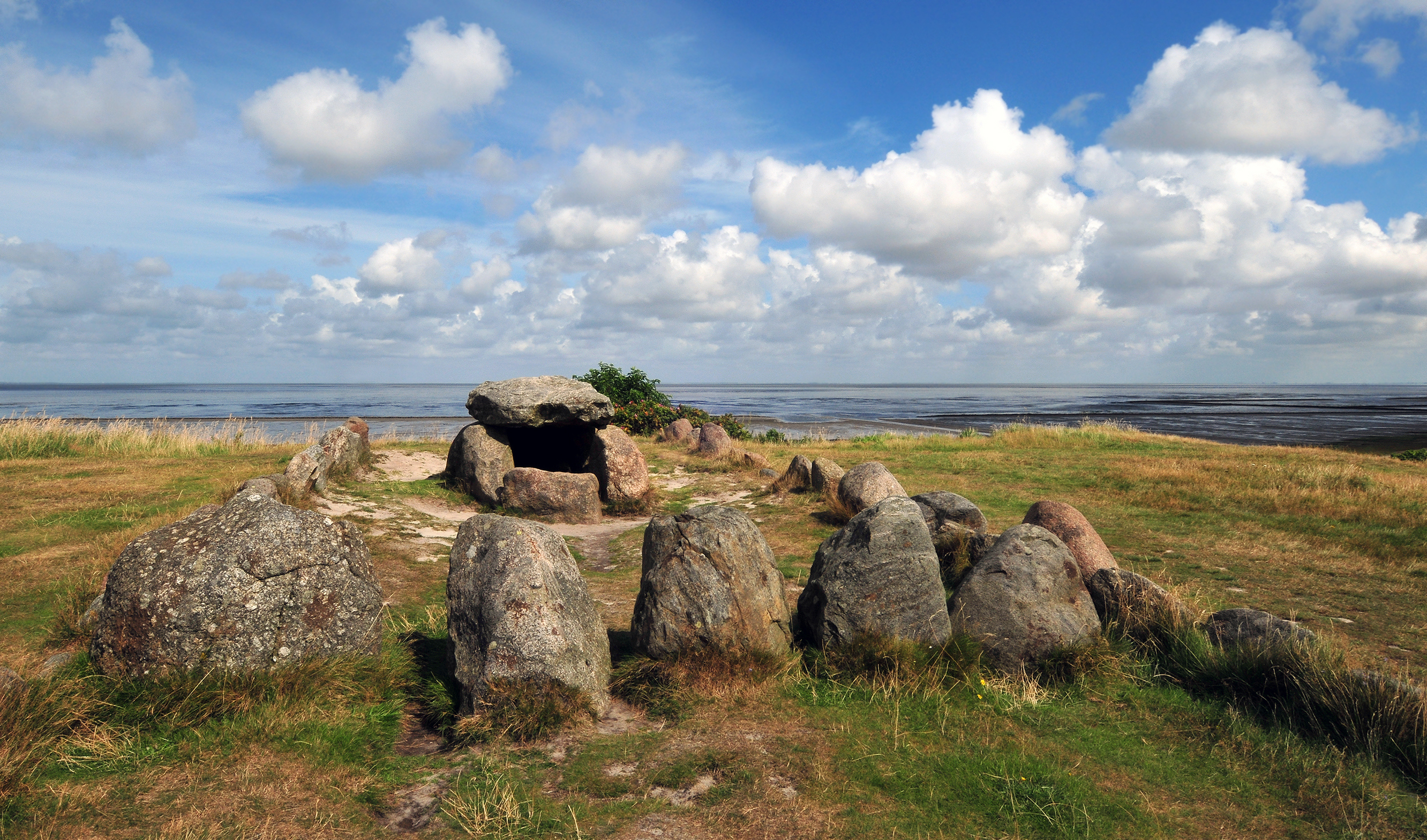
The megalithic tomb

A megalithic tomb, moved to its present location on the edge of Keitum in 1954 from its original position between Keitum and Tinnum, due to the construction of Sylt Airport.

Located next to Harhoog is the Bronze Age tumulus Tipkenhoog. Excavations of the mound in 1870 failed to locate any contents. In World War II, an observation post was situated on the hill, damaging the site.

=== Further attractions ===
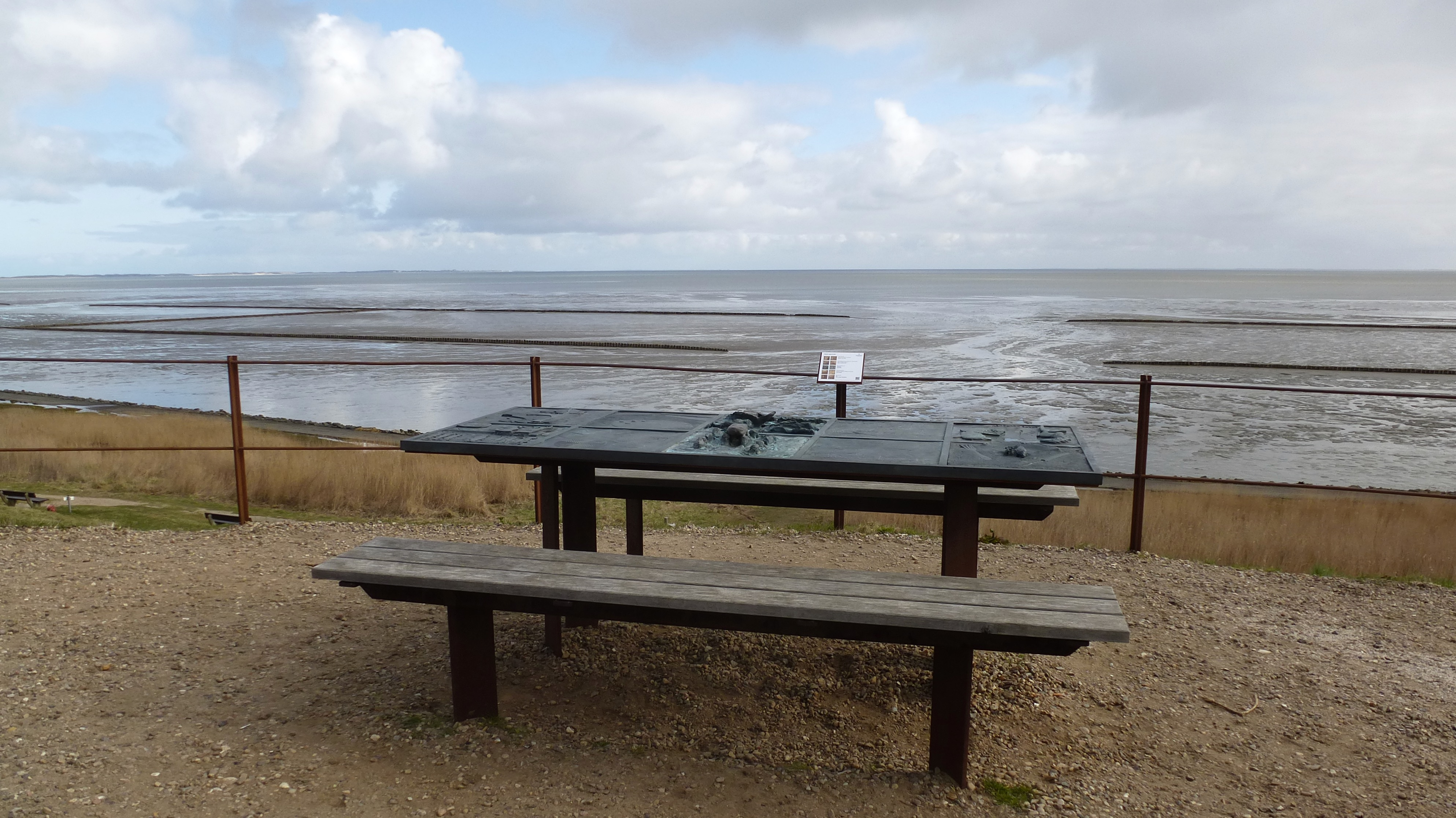
Table at the Cliff

Keitum has three museums: Altfriesische Haus, Sylt Museum and the Feuerwehrmuseum. The former is a house built in 1739 and mostly retains period furniture and accessoires, exhibiting 18th century home decor and living styles. The Sylt Museum is located in a house dating from 1759 and features exhibits on local history and regional living conditions in the past. The Table at the Cliff, created in bronze by five artists in 2019 on the subject of 5000 years of Sylt history is situated at the Sylt Museum.

== Government ==
In the Gebietsreform of 1970, Keitum became part of the newly created municipality Sylt-Ost. It used to be the seat of Sylt-Ost's municipal administration and also of that of the Amt Landschaft Sylt. Sylt-Ost was merged on 1 January 2009 with Rantum and the town of Westerland. In separate referendums in 2008, Westerland (by a large majority) and Sylt-Ost (narrowly) agreed to the merger in May 2008. Rantum followed. In September 2008, the merger contract was signed.

Keitum is now an Ortsteil of Gemeinde Sylt. Since 1 May 2015, the mayor of Gemeinde Sylt has been Nikolas Häckel. The administrations of both Gemeinde Sylt and Landschaft Sylt are today located in Westerland.

== Infrastructure ==
=== Transport ===
Keitum has a railway station on the line between Westerland and Niebüll. However, long-distance trains and the Sylt Shuttle do not stop there. But hourly, there is a direct connection by train to Hamburg-Altona.

== Notable people ==
- Christian Peter Hansen, local historian (1803–1879)
- Gustav Jenner, composer and conductor (1865–1920)
- Boy Lornsen, sculptor and author of children's literature (1922–1995)
- Uwe Jens Lornsen, civil servant and symbolic figure for a unified Schleswig-Holstein (1793–1838)
- Jens Mungard, Frisian poet (1885–1940)
