= Sylt (municipality) =

- Municipality
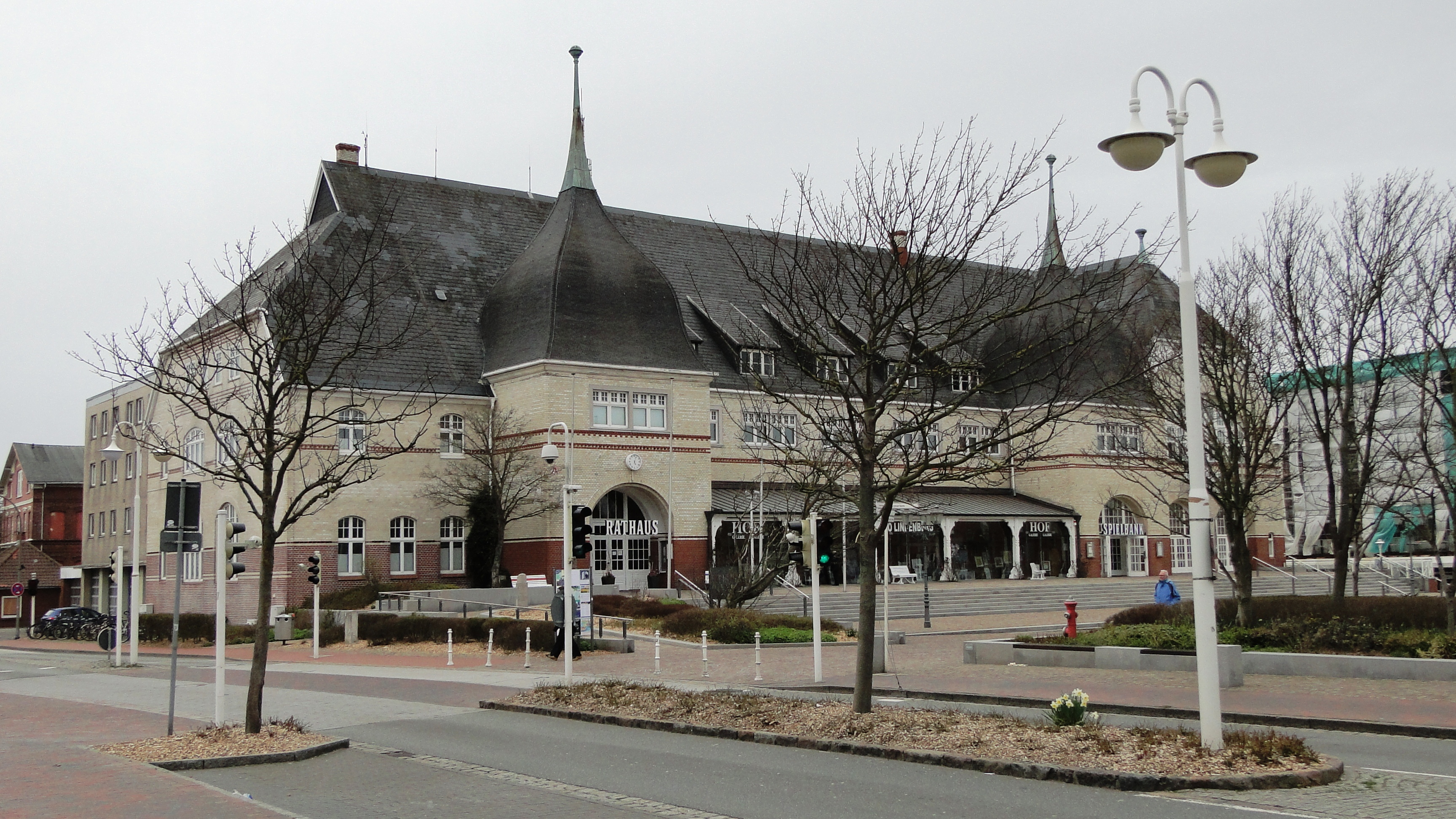
- Town hall Westerland, seat of the municipality of Sylt

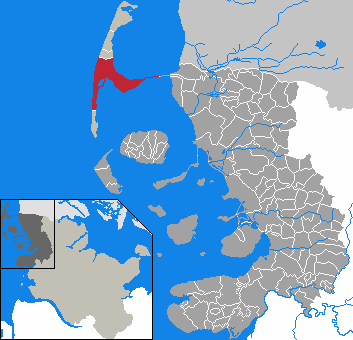
- Location of Sylt within Nordfriesland district
- Interactive map of Sylt
- Location within Germany Location within Schleswig-Holstein
- Coordinates: 54°55′N 8°18′E
- Country: Germany
- State: Schleswig-Holstein
- District: Nordfriesland
- Subdivisions: 7 Ortsteile

Government
  - Mayor: Tina Haltermann (Ind.)

Area
  - Total: 57.31 km^{2} (22.13 sq mi)
- Elevation: 1–5 m (3.3–16.4 ft)

Population (2025-12-31)
  - Total: 14,106
  - Density: 246.1/km^{2} (637.5/sq mi)
- Time zone: UTC+01:00 (CET)
  - Summer (DST): UTC+02:00 (CEST)
- Postal codes: 25969-25980
- Dialling codes: 04651
- Vehicle registration: NF
- Website: www.gemeinde-sylt.de

Sylt (German pronunciation: [zʏlt]; Danish: Sild; Söl'ring North Frisian: Söl) is a municipality on the island of Sylt in the district of Nordfriesland, in Schleswig-Holstein, Germany. It has around 13,000 inhabitants and covers about 60% of the area of the island.

== History ==
The municipality was formed on 1 January 2009 by the merger of the former municipalities Rantum and Sylt-Ost with the town of Westerland. The debate on this move had started in 2003 when a similar merger happened on Fehmarn. However, local rivalries and desire for independence prevented progress for a time. It took the foundation of a citizens' movement Bürger für Sylt als Einheit to advance the plan. In separate referendums in 2008, Westerland (by a large majority) and Sylt-Ost (narrowly) agreed to the merger in May 2008. Rantum followed, but List, Kampen, Wenningstedt-Braderup and Hörnum remained aloof. In September 2008 the merger contract was signed.

Although Westerland used to have the status of Stadt (town), the new municipality so far refrained from applying for this status. One reason is that the Ortsteile do not want to advertise their tourism services as simple suburbs (Stadtteile).

== Geography ==
=== Subdivision ===
The municipality consists of the following Ortsteile (towns):

1. Archsum*
2. Keitum*
3. Morsum*
4. Munkmarsch*
5. Rantum
6. Tinnum*
7. Westerland

(* Former constituent part of Sylt-Ost.)

== Government ==
Sylt shares its administration in a Verwaltungsgemeinschaft with the Amt Landschaft Sylt, located in the townhall of Westerland – the former Kurhaus, built in 1897.

=== Municipal council ===
The Gemeindevertretung Sylt (Sylt Municipal Council) has 33 members. Since the election of 14 May 2023 the distribution has been as follows:

- CDU: 12 seats
- The Greens: 4 seats
- SPD: 4 seats
- FDP: 1 seat
- SSW: 4 seats
- Insel-Liste zukunft.sylt: 1 seat
- Die Insulaner: 3 seats
- Sylter Wählergemeinschaft: 4 seats

=== Mayor ===
In April 2025, Tina Haltermann was elected as new mayor in the second round of voting which she won with 55.6% of the vote (against 44.4% for Markus Gieppner). She replaced Carsten Kerkamm, who was leading the municipality on an interim basis after the vote to remove Nicolas Häckel from office in september 2024.
