= Hindenburgdamm =

Causeway in Germany

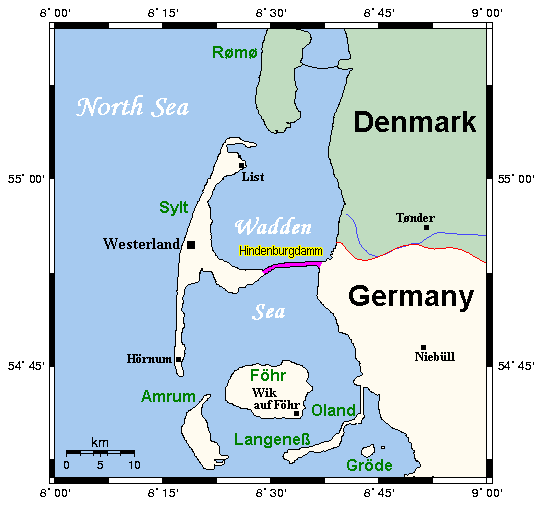
Hindenburgdamm on a map of the region. Causeways joining Oland, Langeneß and Rømø to the mainland are also shown.

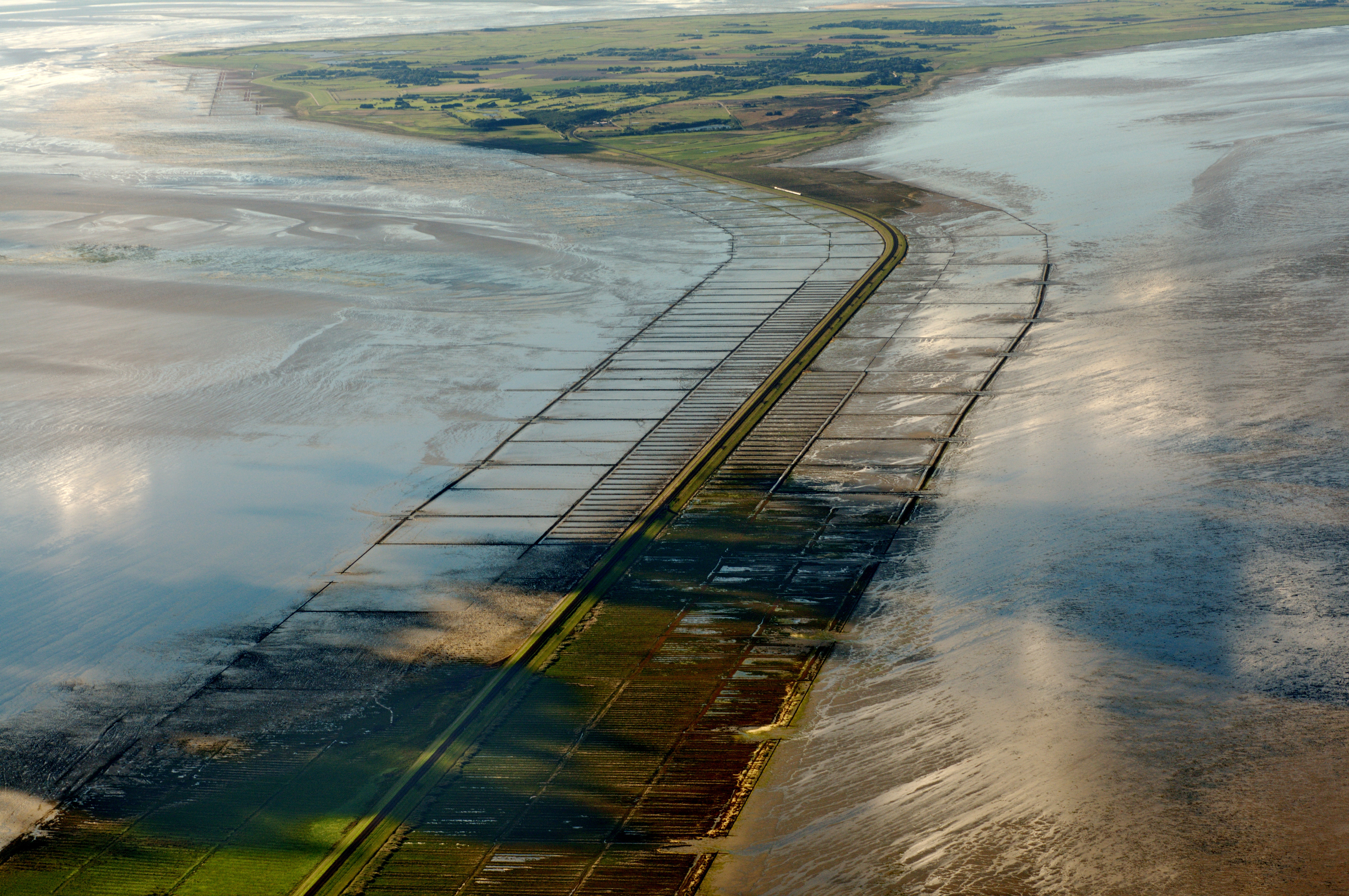
Aerial view of the Hindenburgdamm

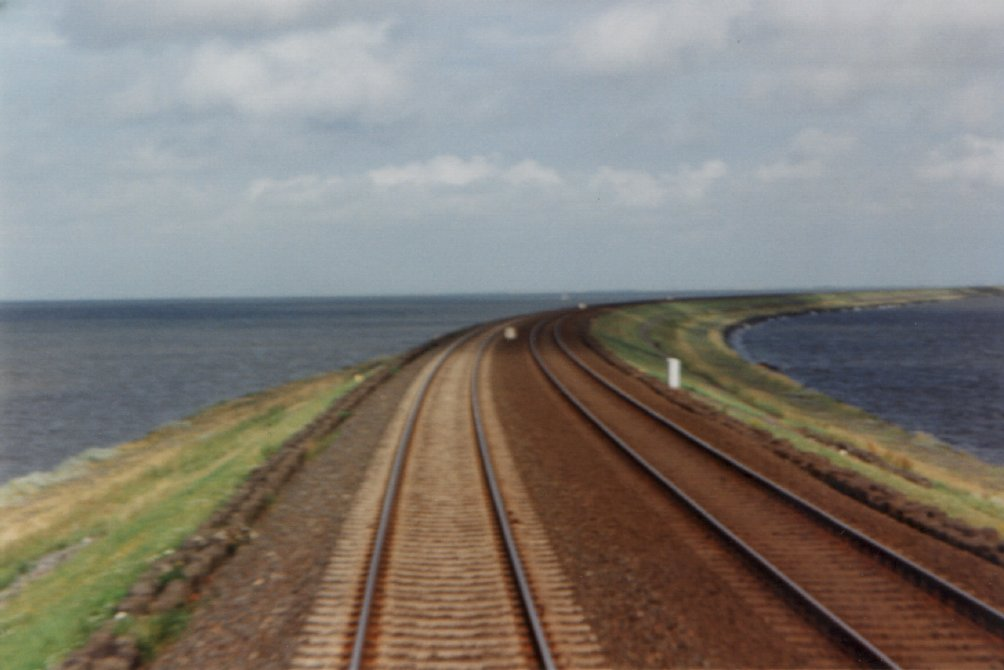
Hindenburgdamm

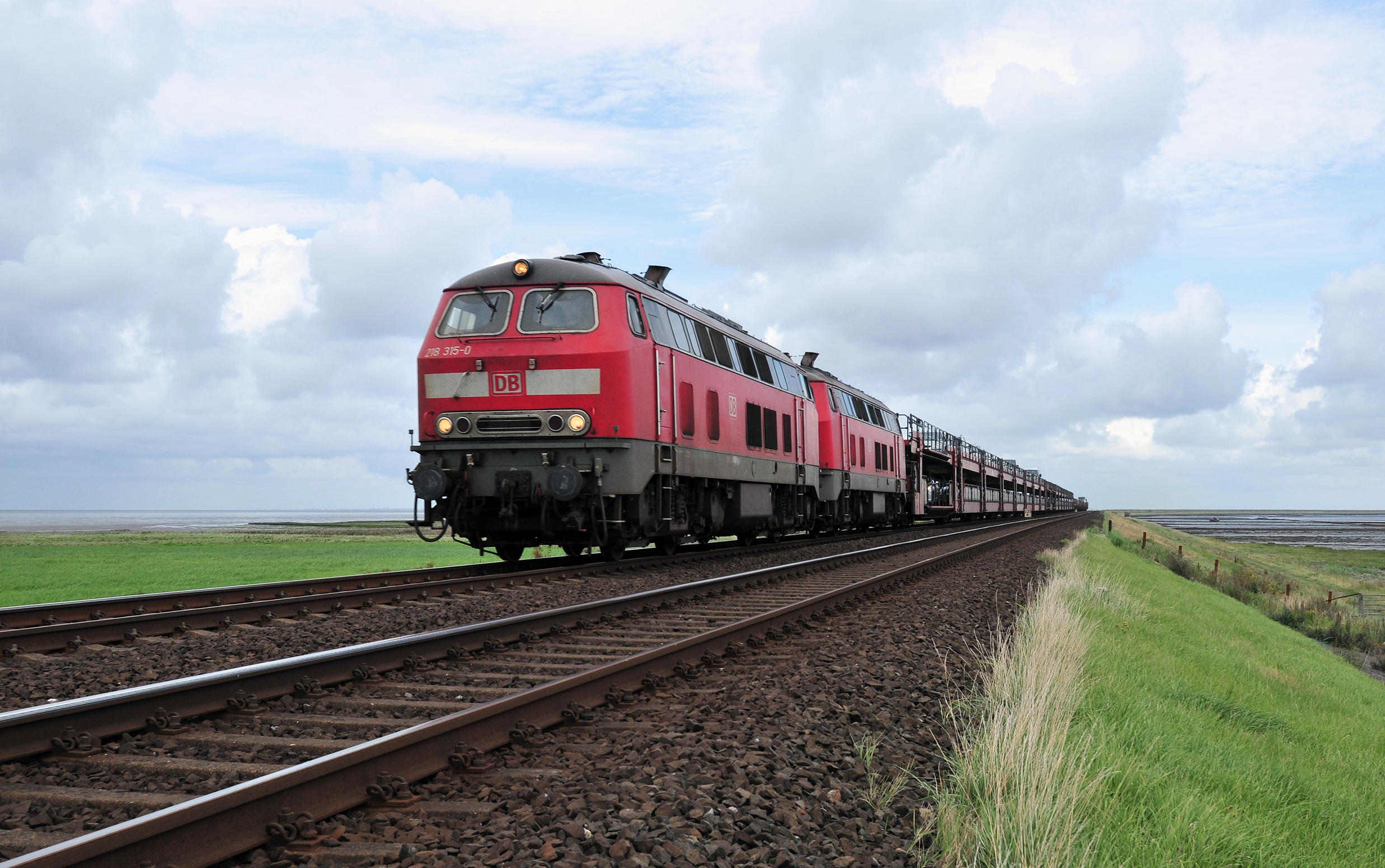
The SyltShuttle on the Hindenburgdamm

The Hindenburgdamm or Hindenburg Dam is an 11 km (7 mile) long causeway joining the North Frisian island of Sylt to mainland Schleswig-Holstein. Its coordinates are 54°53′N 8°33′E. It was opened on 1 June 1927 and is exclusively a railway corridor. The companies that built the Hindenburgdamm, a job that took four years, were Philipp Holzmann AG of Frankfurt, working from the mainland, and Peter Fix Söhne of Duisburg working from Sylt. A train trip along the causeway takes about 10 minutes, and the time between the auto terminals at Niebüll on the mainland and Westerland on Sylt is about 30 minutes. The Hindenburgdamm is part of the railway line known as the Marschbahn ("Marsh Railway"), which is double-tracked along much of the route, although there as yet exists a single-tracked stretch. On the causeway is a signal box. The rail line is not electrified making the use of diesel locomotives necessary. Trains coming from origins further south like Hamburg change from an electric locomotive to a diesel locomotive at Itzehoe.

Every day, more than 100 trains pass over the causeway, 50 of those ferrying cars (there is no road link to Sylt). Each year, the railway ferries more than 450,000 vehicles over the causeway.

The causeway, which bears the Weimar Republic Reichspräsident Paul von Hindenburg's name, has interrupted the tidal flow, which until the causeway's appearance had flowed freely between Sylt and the mainland. This change in tides, it is believed, is part of what has led to the loss of a certain amount of land at Sylt's southern end.

The causeway lies in the specially protected Zone I of the Schleswig-Holsteinisches Wattenmeer National Park. Walks on the tidal flats are not allowed here, although they are quite popular elsewhere.

== Situation before the causeway was built ==
After the Second War of Schleswig in 1864, when Prussia took over Schleswig from Denmark, Sylt and Westerland belonged to the new Tondern district. The seaside bathing town of Westerland gradually grew in popularity. The west coast railway already ran from Altona by way of Husum and Niebüll to Tønder (then also in Germany and called Tondern). From here, the tracks were extended to the port at the Hoyerschleuse, whence paddlesteamers ran to Munkmarsch harbour on Sylt.

The connection was at the tide's mercy and, in winter, the ice in the Wadden Sea formed an impenetrable barrier. Already being planned at that time was a rail causeway from the mainland to Nösse on Sylt. The horrendous cost of such a project kept it shelved for quite a while, until Westerland attained the status of a town in 1905. Westerland's growing popularity as a seaside resort led in 1910 to serious official planning for the rail causeway.

World War I brought all planning to a stop. After the war, Germany was obliged to cede Tønder and the Hoyerschleuse to Denmark. Sylt remained part of Germany, but owing to the new border, the old route to Sylt was now cut off, except if travellers wanted to go to the trouble of obtaining a Danish visa to make a short trip through Danish territory.

== Construction ==
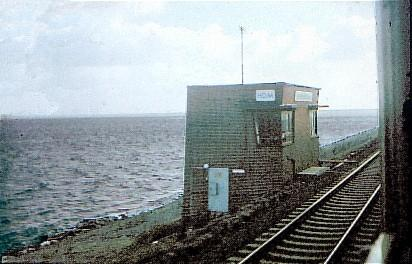
Signal box HDM in the middle of the Hindenburgdamm

Because of this unacceptable situation, construction on the long planned causeway was finally begun by Philipp Holzmann in 1925. Early in the construction, a storm flood swept away what had already been built. After this experience, it was decided to realign the causeway's route somewhat more towards the north. A trenchlike cofferdam was built to facilitate construction. 1,000-1,500 workers were employed on the project. In the two years that it took to build the causeway, more than 3 million cubic metres (4 million cu. yd.) of sand and clay were moved, and 120,000 tonnes of stones used. It was opened on 1 June 1927.

== Rail traffic ==
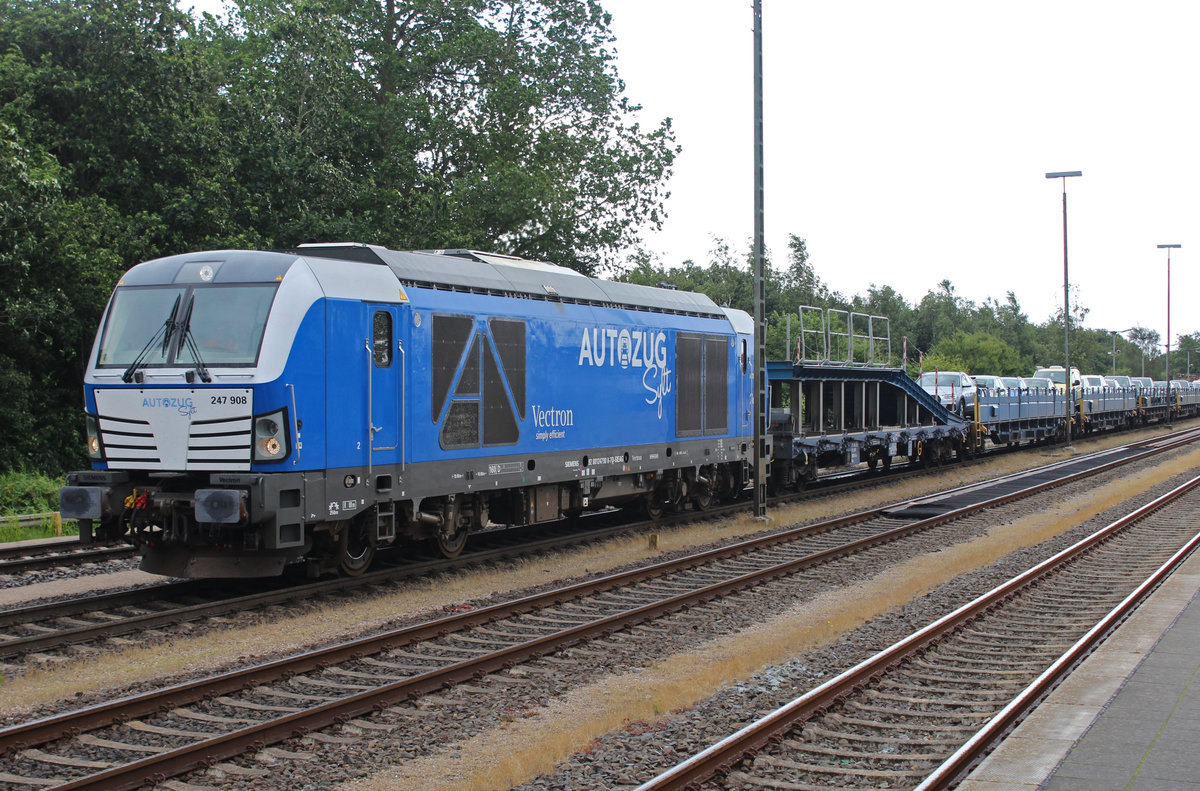
RDC Autozug Sylt (Blue)

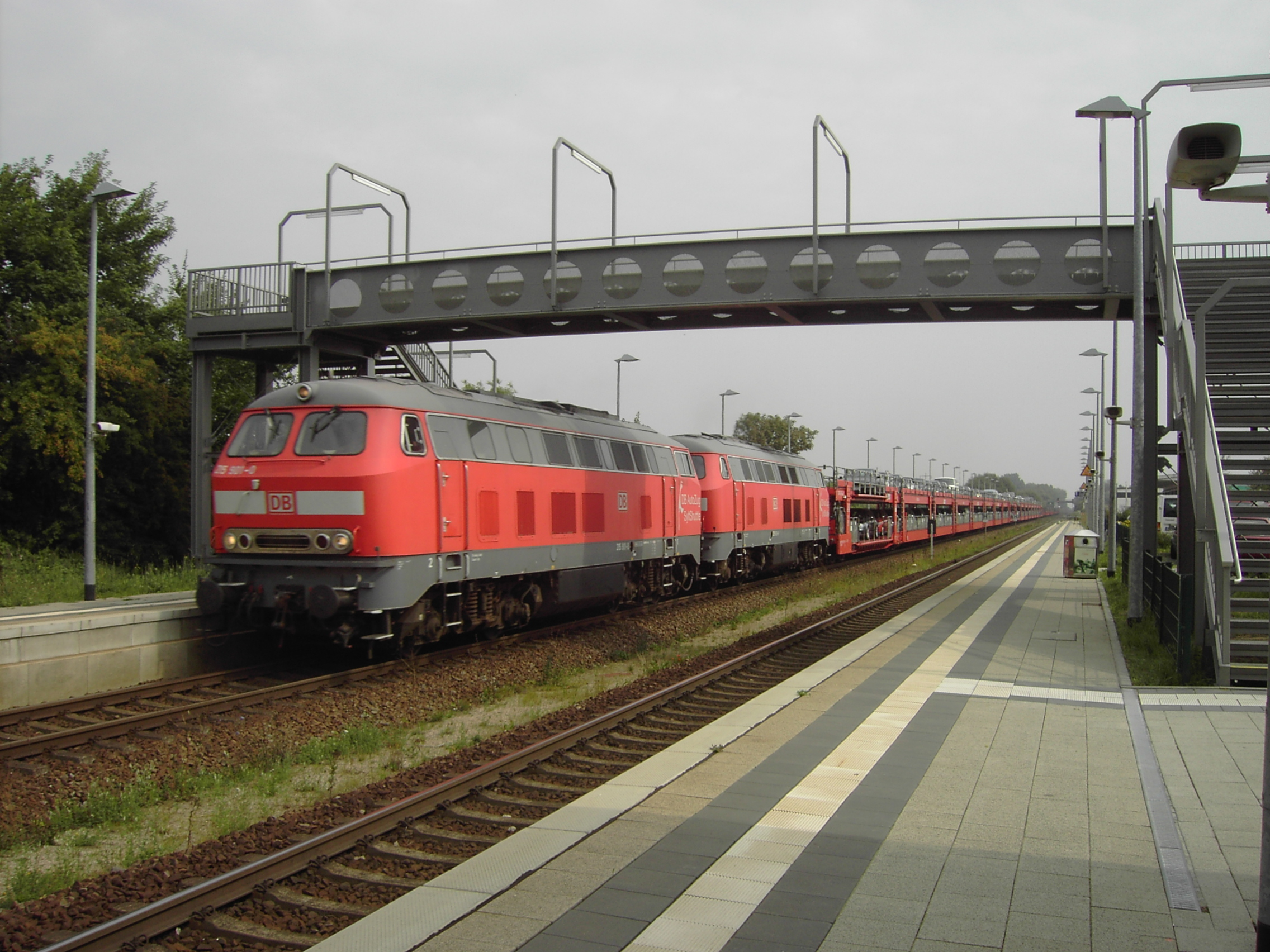
DB AutoZug Sylt-Shuttle (Red)

The auto-train car shuttle train terminal in Niebüll is connected to the Autobahnen in Schleswig-Holstein by Federal Highways (Bundesstraßen) B5 and B199. Two operators run shuttle trains:

- Red: Sylt-Shuttle by DB AutoZug (German Railways)
- Blue: Autozug Sylt by Railroad Development Corporation (RDC)

=== Incidents ===
On 3 September 2009, there was a fatal accident on the Hindenburgdamm when a squall blew a truck off a flatcar in one of the auto-trains. The driver was thrown out of the truck and died at the accident scene.

== Namesake ==
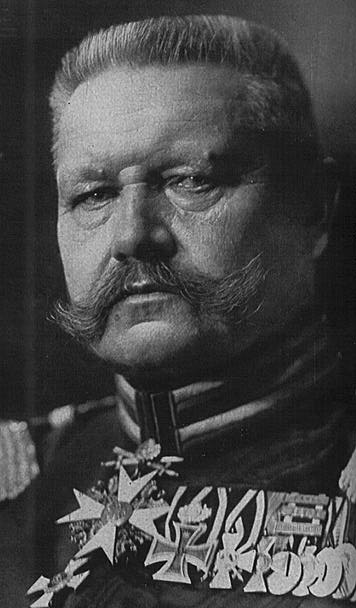
Paul von Hindenburg

In the 1960s and 1970s, the name "Hindenburgdamm" came to be criticized, since its namesake was a controversial figure. There were many initiatives to find the causeway a new name, but none of the suggestions (including "Sylt-Damm", "Friedens-Damm" ["Peace Causeway"] and "Friesen-Damm" ["Frisian Causeway"]) won majority support.

== Future ==
In 2006, rumours came up that the single-tracked stretches of the line (between Niebüll and Klanxbüll and between Morsum and Westerland) were to be extended to double-track. However, these rumours proved to be false. Work started in 2008 at the Lehnshallig crossover merely had the purpose of replacing old equipment.

== Sources ==
- Hans Bock: Die Marschbahn von Altona nach Westerland. Boyens, Heide 1989, ISBN 3-8042-0458-9
- Groß, Lothar (2012). Made in Germany: Deutschlands Wirtschaftsgeschichte von der Industralisierung bis heute Band 1: 1800 - 1945. Books on demand. ISBN 978-3-8482-1042-8.
- Erich Staisch: Der Zug nach Norden. Ernst Kabel, Hamburg 1994, ISBN 3-8225-0298-7
- Rolf Stumpf: Die Eisenbahn nach Sylt. EK, Freiburg 2003, ISBN 3-88255-455-X (Regionale Verkehrsgeschichte 38)
