= Rantum =

- Ortsteil of Sylt
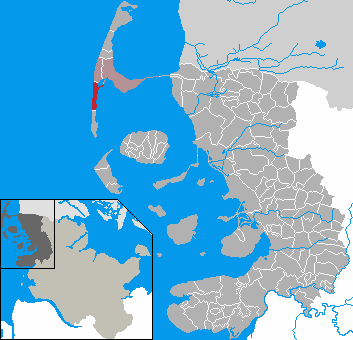
- Location of Rantum within the Nordfriesland district
- Interactive map of Rantum
- Location within Germany Location within Schleswig-Holstein
- Coordinates: 54°51′N 8°18′E
- Country: Germany
- State: Schleswig-Holstein
- District: Nordfriesland
- Town: Sylt

Area
  - Total: 9.39 km^{2} (3.63 sq mi)
- Elevation: 3 m (9.8 ft)

Population (2007-12-31)
  - Total: 561
  - Density: 59.7/km^{2} (155/sq mi)
- Time zone: UTC+01:00 (CET)
  - Summer (DST): UTC+02:00 (CEST)
- Postal codes: 25980
- Dialling codes: 0 46 51
- Vehicle registration: NF
- Website: www.gemeinde-sylt.de

Rantum (German pronunciation: [ˈʁantʊm]; Sölring Frisian: Raantem) is a village and a former municipality on the island of Sylt in the district of Nordfriesland, in Schleswig-Holstein, Germany. Since 1 January 2009, it has been an Ortsteil (part) of the municipality Sylt.

== Etymology ==
The name is frequently associated with the marine goddess Rán (Rantum = Rán's place).

It is, however, more likely that the name derives from the old spelling of Raantem, i.e. "settlement at the edge".

== Geography ==
Rantum today is located at the narrowest part of the island with a width of only 600 metres.

East of the village are the Rantum-Inge, an ample area of salt marshes and the Wadden Sea. To the west, beyond the dunes, the beach faces the open North Sea.

== History ==
The small village of Rantum has a colourful history. The settlement was destroyed on multiple occasions by storm surges or was buried by sand drift.

The oldest record of the name is found in a nautical chart from 1142, which is today displayed in Copenhagen. On the chart, the Rantum church Westerseekirche is noted as a daymark. It was called St. Peter. Since at the time only major churches would be consecrated to St. Peter, it is likely that Rantum was an influential town around 1100. There is, however, no proof for this thesis.

As Rantum was repeatedly destroyed by storm surges between 1362 and 1634 and had to be rebuilt in a different location each time, historical records are only preserved from the 17th century on.

Well into the 18th century, Rantum was a stronghold of wreckers who looted ships for a living.

In 1801, the people of Rantum had to move the village due to encroachment by the dunes. In 1825, the new village was destroyed by a flood. The location of the village kept moving eastward over time.

In 1901, the Sylter Inselbahn linked Westerland and Hörnum via Rantum. It was abolished in 1970.

Beginning in 1936, the Wehrmacht had a 568 hectare area of the wadden sea encircled by a dyke and flooded to create the Rantumbecken (Rantum Basin) as a take-off and landing site for seaplanes.

In 1977, the small Rantum Harbour was created from the remains of a naval air station pier, and is not a tidally independent marina. It is an example of traditional Frisian problem solving, the pier is notable for having old radiators and tyres strewn atop.

== Attractions ==
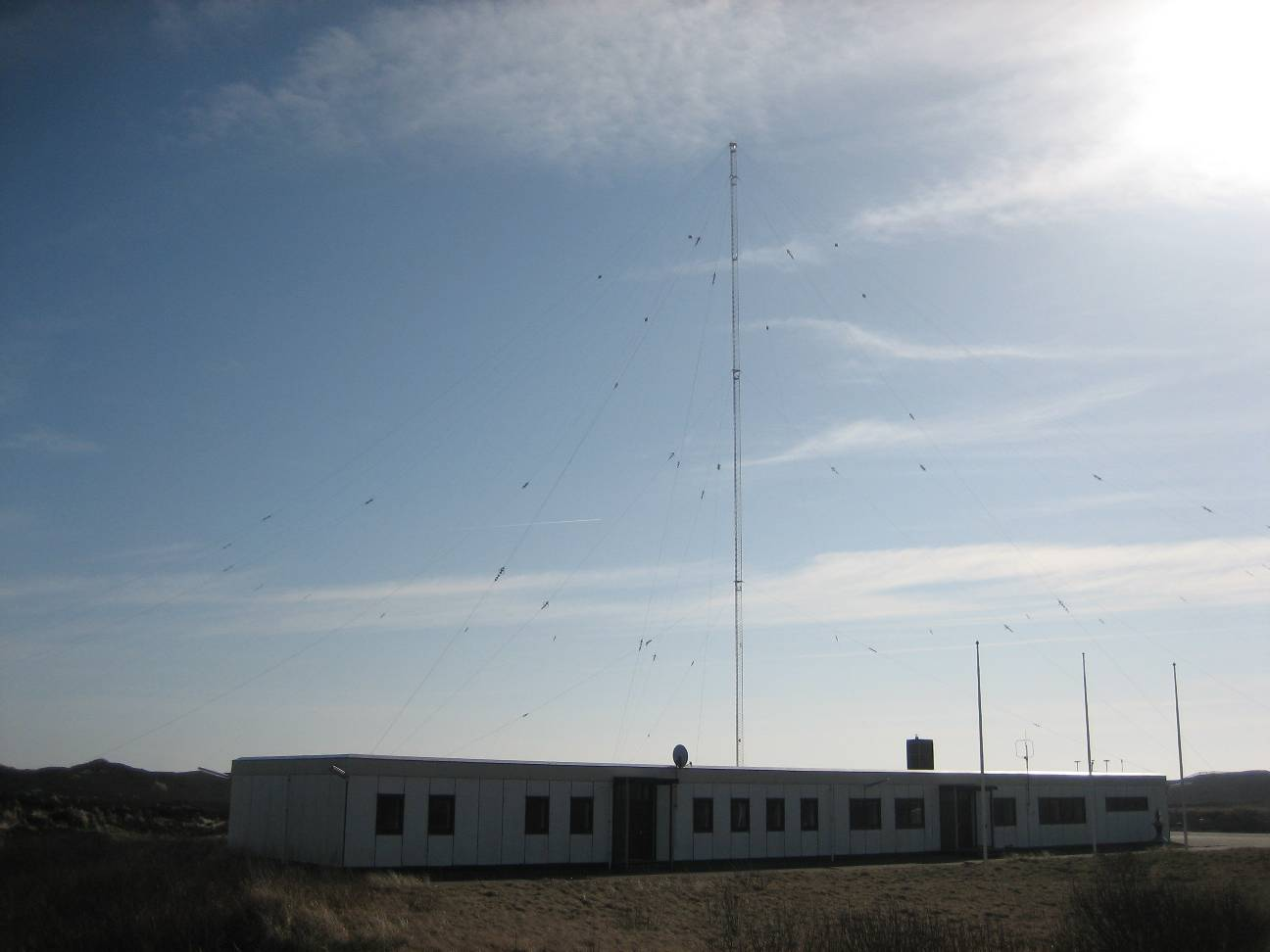
LORAN radiator at Rantum

Local sights include the Eidum decoy pond, which served for catching ducks. It is named after the village of Eidum which was drowned in a 1436 flood.

Today, the Rantum Basin is a bird sanctuary with more than 60 species to be counted. Since 1962, this has been a protected nature preserve.

Since 1993, the Sylt Quelle (Sylt Well) has been pumping mineral water containing iodine for bottling. This water is marketed across the island and can also be tapped on the spot by customers. The brand is offered by restaurants across Germany. In the adjacent Kunstraum, exhibitions, lectures, public discussions and stage plays take place. In addition, this has become the venue for the Meerkabarett, the Sea Cabaret, which annually features various artists during the summer season.

The Wadden Sea Conservation Station (Schutzstation Wattenmeer) operates a branch office in Rantum which provides information on coastal management, the Wadden Sea, the salt marshes and offers guided mudflat hiking.

A LORAN-C transmitter for radio navigation is located near Rantum, using a 193 metres (633 ft) tall lattice tower mast radiator as an antenna. The regular service was ended on 31 December 2005.

== Economy ==
Rantum was designated Nordseebad in 1973. Tourism is the main source of income today.

=== Youth facilities ===
Rantum hosts the Weiße Zeltstadt (White Tent City) camp site. During the summer holidays, the Schleswig-Flensburg District Sports Association offers youth camps there. The Arbeitsgemeinschaft Deutsches Schleswig e.V operates a congress venue for youths and a summer school. In the southern part of the village, the Puan Klent youth resort is located.

== Government ==
Rantum was merged on 1 January 2009 with Sylt-Ost and the town of Westerland. In separate referendums in 2008, Westerland (by a large majority) and Sylt-Ost (narrowly) agreed to the merger in May 2008. Rantum followed. In September 2008, the merger contract was signed.

Rantum is now an Ortsteil of Gemeinde Sylt. Since 1 May 2015, the mayor of Gemeinde Sylt has been Nikolas Häckel.
