= Ingo Kühl =

German artist, draughtsperson and painter

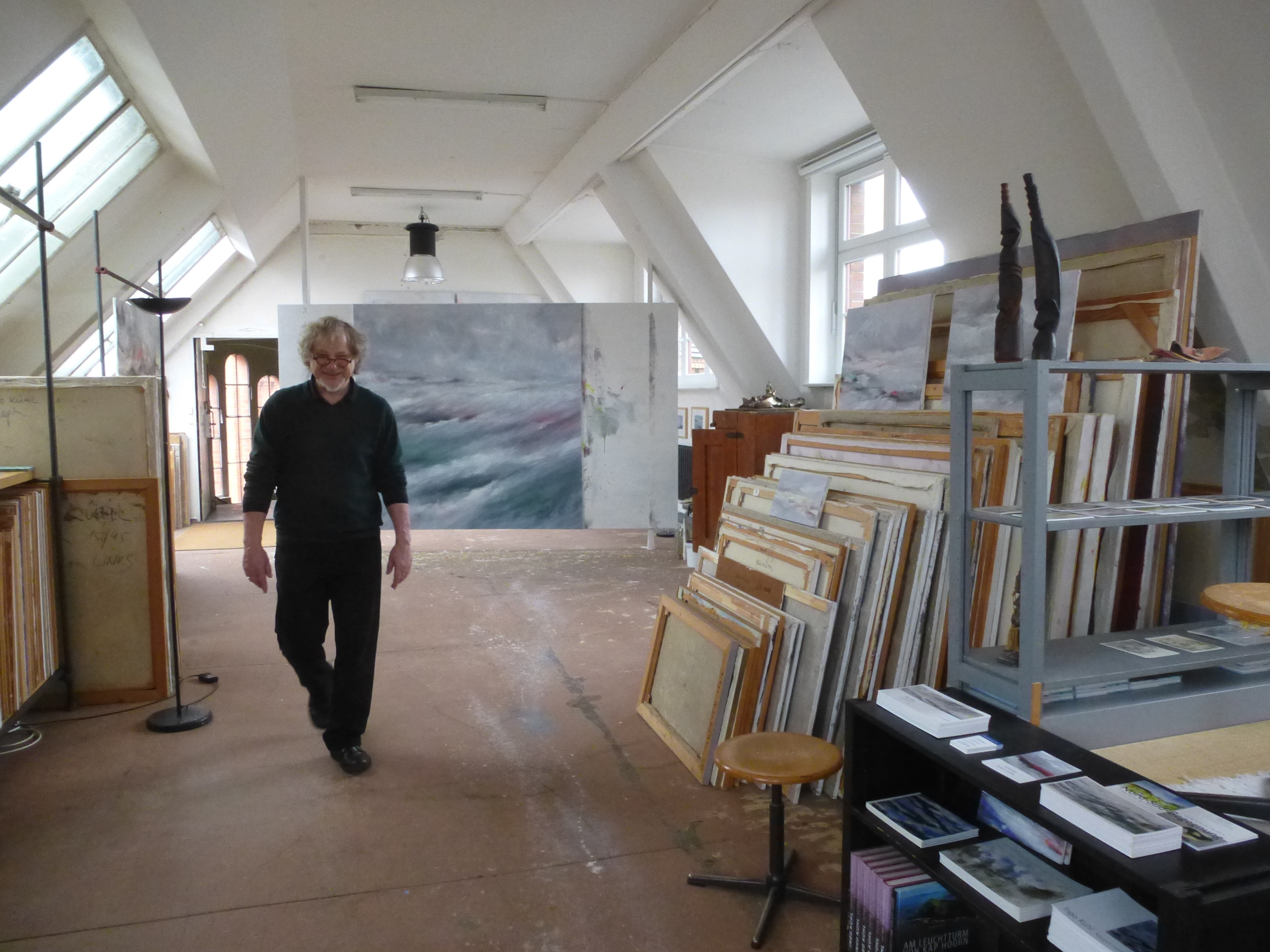
- Ingo Kühl at the Berlin studio, 2015
- Born: 29 June 1953 (age 73); Bovenau, West Germany
- Education: Kiel University of Applied Sciences, Berlin University of the Arts
- Occupations: Painter, sculptor and architect
- Website: ingokuehl.com

Ingo Kühl (born 29 June 1953) is a German painter, sculptor and architect.

== Life ==
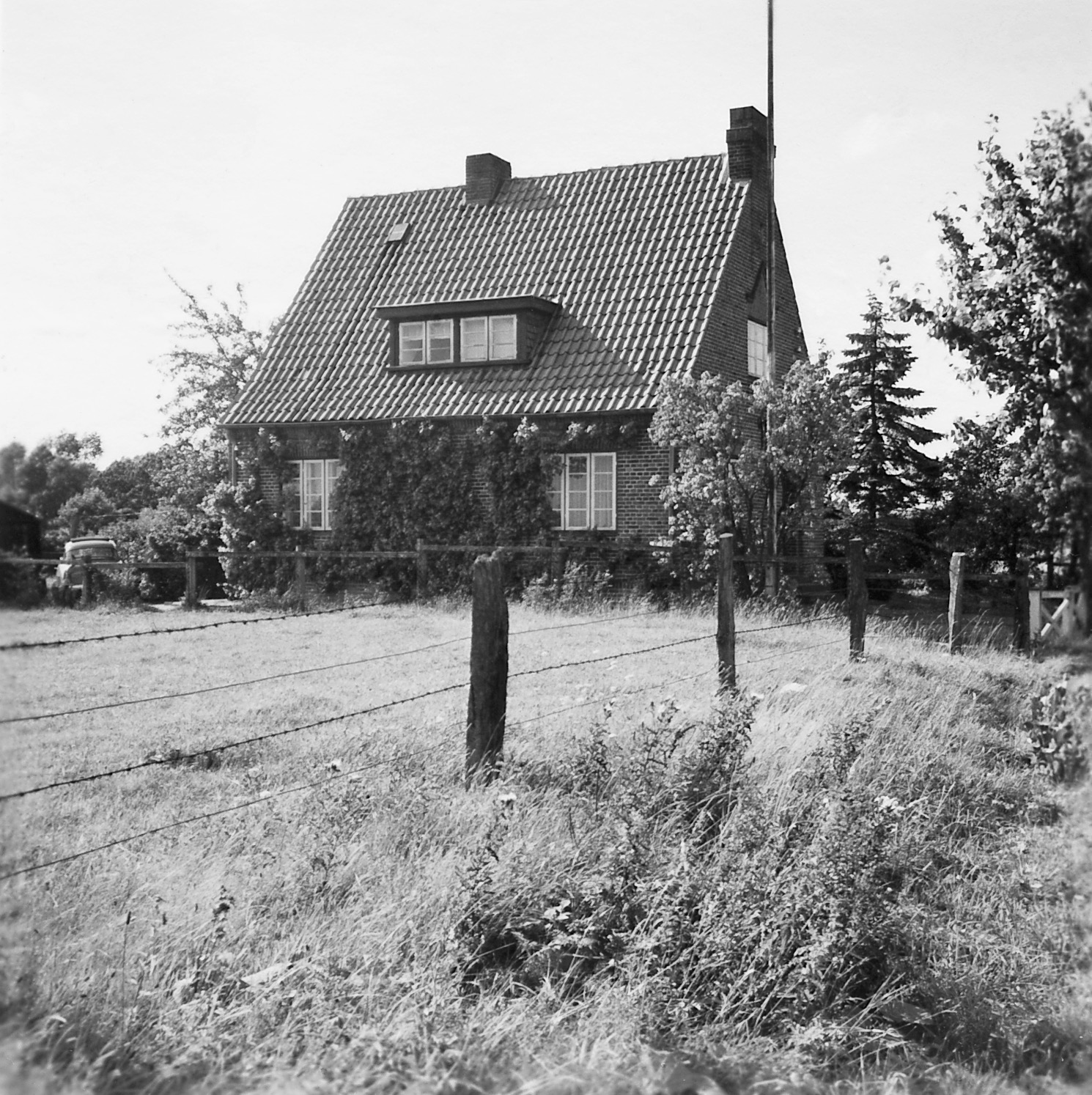
Ingo Kühl's birthplace, former police station in Bovenau, 1957

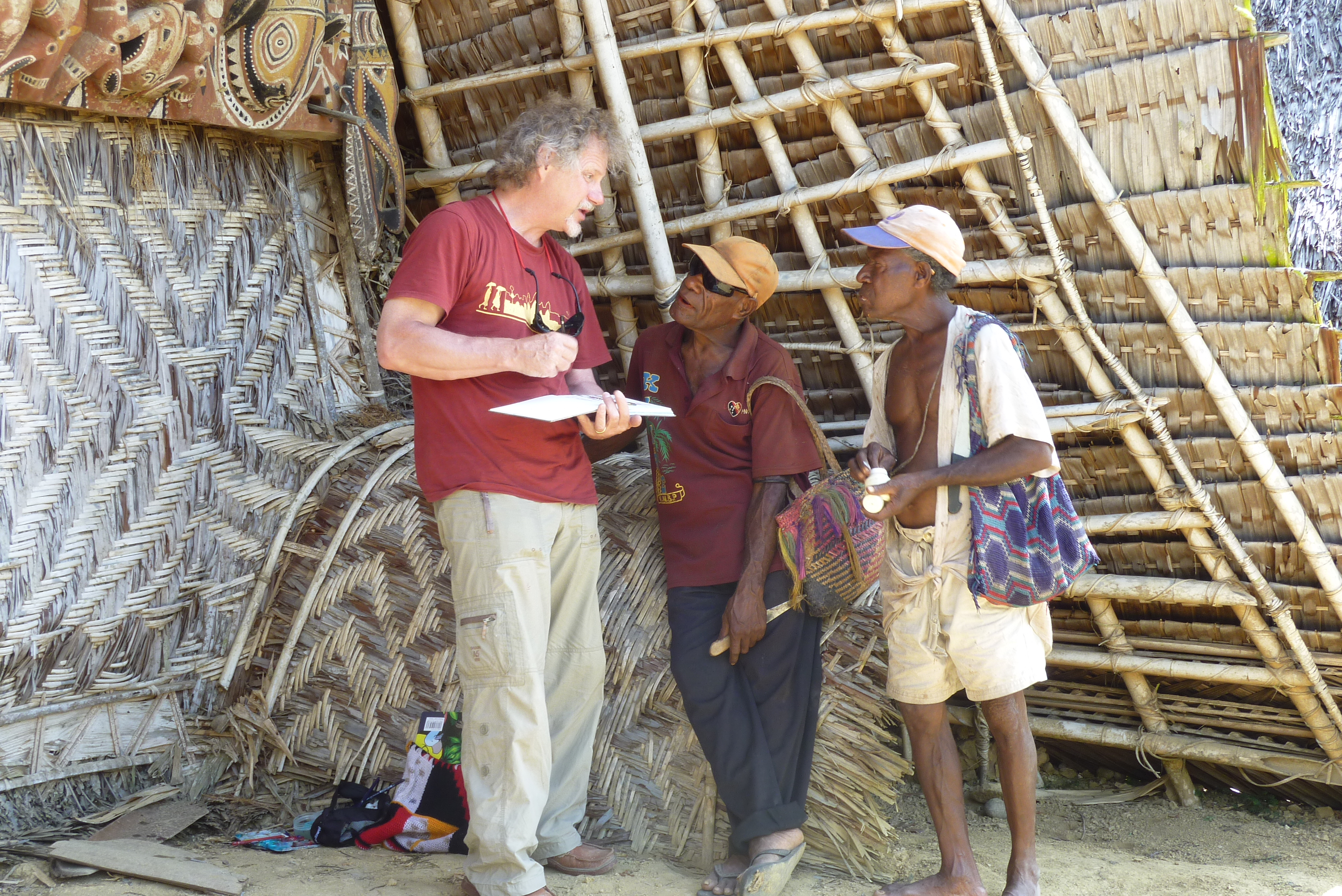
Papua New Guinea, East Sepik area, Maprik District, in front of a Haus Tambaran, Ingo Kühl (drawing in a sketchbook) with indigenous men, 2012

Grown up in Bovenau near Kiel in Schleswig-Holstein as a son of a policeman, Ingo Kühl attended the Theodor-Storm-Realschule in Hanerau-Hademarschen. After a traineeship as a carpenter and a drafter he studied architecture at the Kiel University of Applied Sciences. From 1977 to 1982, he studied architecture and fine arts at the Berlin University of the Arts. At that time Surrealism influenced his drawings dealing with architectural fantasies. Motivated by an encounter with the painter Heinz Trökes in 1979, he turned towards painting. He traveled throughout Europe using his first sketchbooks. In 1977 a trip to Israel, Sinai Peninsula, followed. In 1978 he participated in an excursion to Teheran led by Prof. Rainer Ernst, with a sojourn in Isfahan. Additional to his Berlin artist's studio he ran a studio on the North Sea peninsula Eiderstedt (from 1980 to 1994), followed by studios on the North Sea islands Amrum an Nordstrand. Since 2002 Sylt has been his preferred domicile. In 1982 he had a studio in Brooklyn, New York. In 1984 he became a Member of the Chamber of Architects Berlin as a "self-employed architect" and tried to build one of Hermann Finsterlin's Architecture Visions. In 1987 he resigned from the Chamber of Architects to devote himself entirely to painting. In 1988 he published the book Luft und Wasser – Gedichte und Bilder together with Sarah Kirsch in the Steidl Verlag. The first bronze casting of an Architectural Sculpture was realized.

In 1999 he visited the Lofoten, set up a provisional studio in Reine in a rorbu and painted the view over the harbor to the mountain range and the Moskstraumen. In 2000 he made a trip around the world: Thailand, Laos, New Zealand, South Pacific, Peru. In 2001 he married Annette Kühl and they both spent a year in the South Seas: Cook Islands, French Polynesia, Fiji, Vanuatu. He painted South Sea pictures. After participating in an expedition of the Vanuatu Cultural Centre to ceremonies of the indigenous people in Lamap on Malakula, his works that were created there were shown in an exhibition at the National Museum of Vanuatu.

Travels followed to Chile, where he painted the Picture cycle Landscapes of the End of the World (2005) in Tierra del Fuego and circumnavigated Cape Horn on board of a sailing yacht (2009). In Papua New Guinea he worked together with the indigenous sculptor Tomulopa Deko. The two explored the Sepik area (2010). In 2012 he returned to Papua New Guinea with his wife and both traveled in company with Tomulopa Deko to the Sepik River again. Afterwards they visited the Trobriand Islands, where Ingo Kühl studied the Kula culture.

In 2019 he took part in the project "Tisch am Kliff" (Table on the Cliff): Two bronze plates each on the theme of 5000 years of Sylt history designed and assembled into a table plate by five artists, set up on the Wadden Sea in the immediate vicinity of the Sylt Museum in Keitum.

Ingo Kühl lives in Berlin and Keitum / Sylt.

== Oeuvre ==
=== Painting ===
In his early work, echoes of Surrealism, Abstract Expressionism, Action painting and Tachism can be recognized. From 1983 he dealt with Landscape painting and after a phase of almost monochrome non-representational pictures that are reminiscent of the work of Gotthard Graubner, he turned back to paintings based on natural phenomena. The series of pictures Färöer (Faroe Islands) (1995) and Winterreise (based on Franz Schubert) (1995/96) were created. In 1998 he painted four large-format oil paintings on the subject of Vier Jahreszeiten (Four Seasons) for the Johanniter Hospital in Fläming in Treuenbrietzen. These were followed by picture cycles such as Landschaften am Ende der Welt (2005), Das Haus am Watt (House on the Mudflats) (2015) and Winterreise II (2025/26).

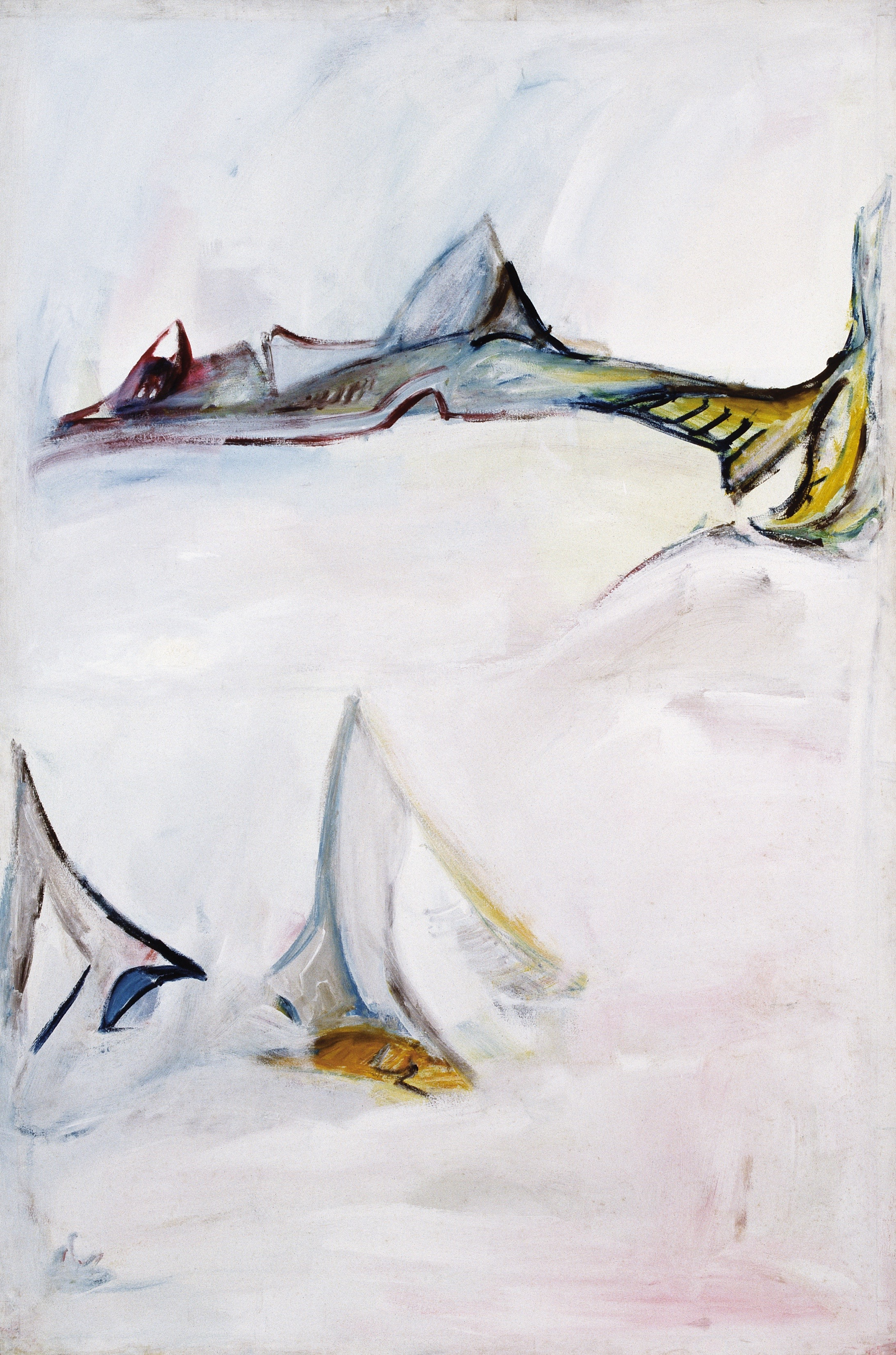
"Architektur (Brücke) in Schneelandschaft" 1980, oil on cotton, 200 × 130 cm

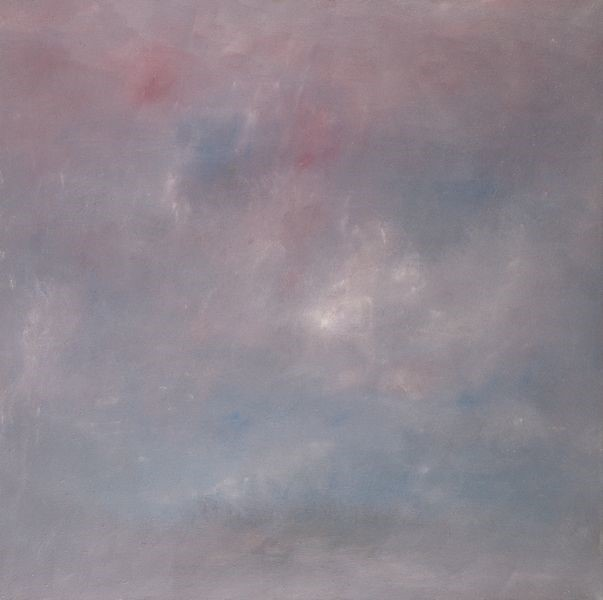
Farbraum, 1986, oil on canvas, 100 × 100 cm, Schleswig-Holsteinische Landesmuseen, Schloss Gottorf, Schleswig

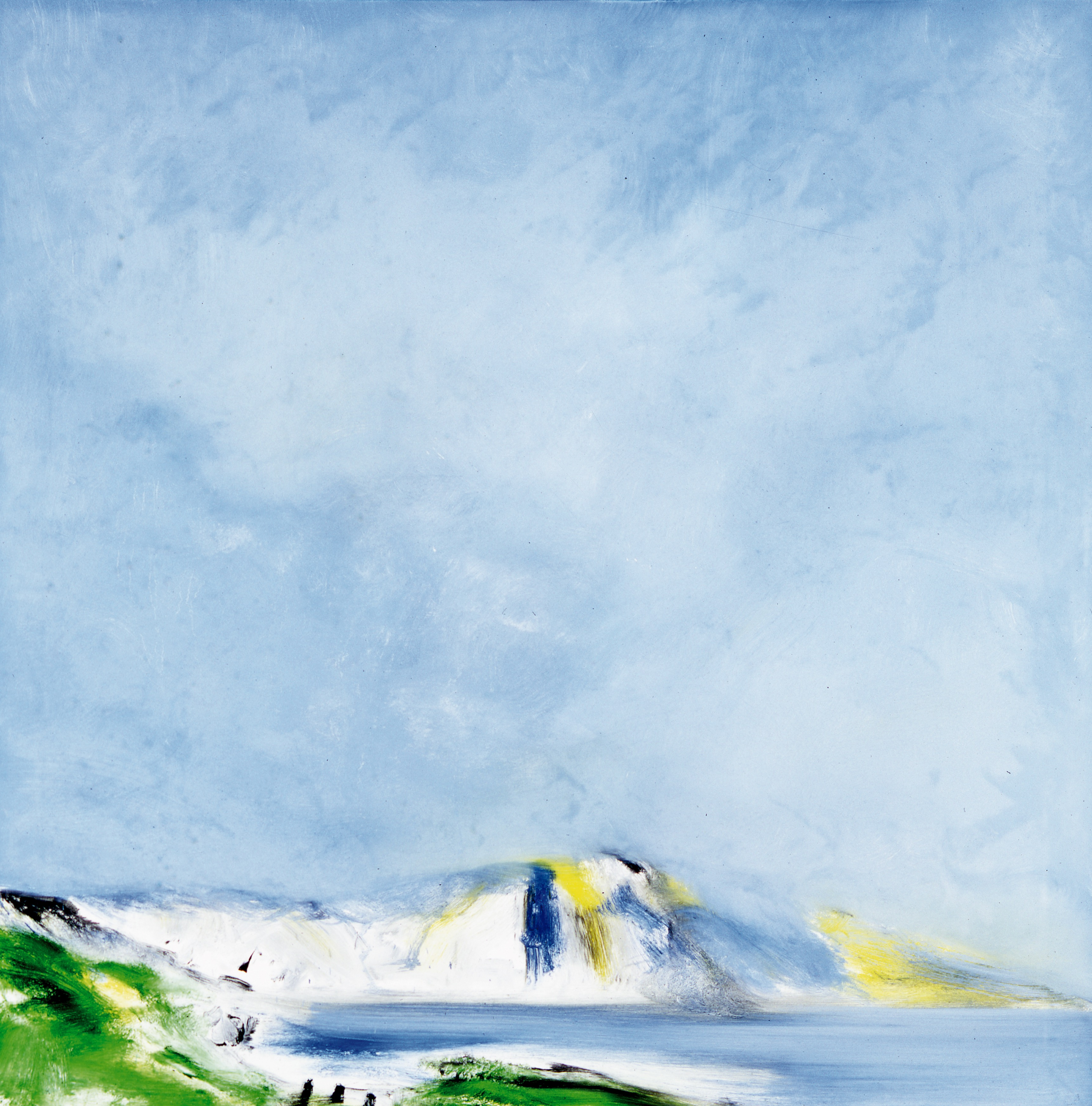
Färöer II from the picture cycle Färöer, 1995, oil on cotton, 120 x 120 cm

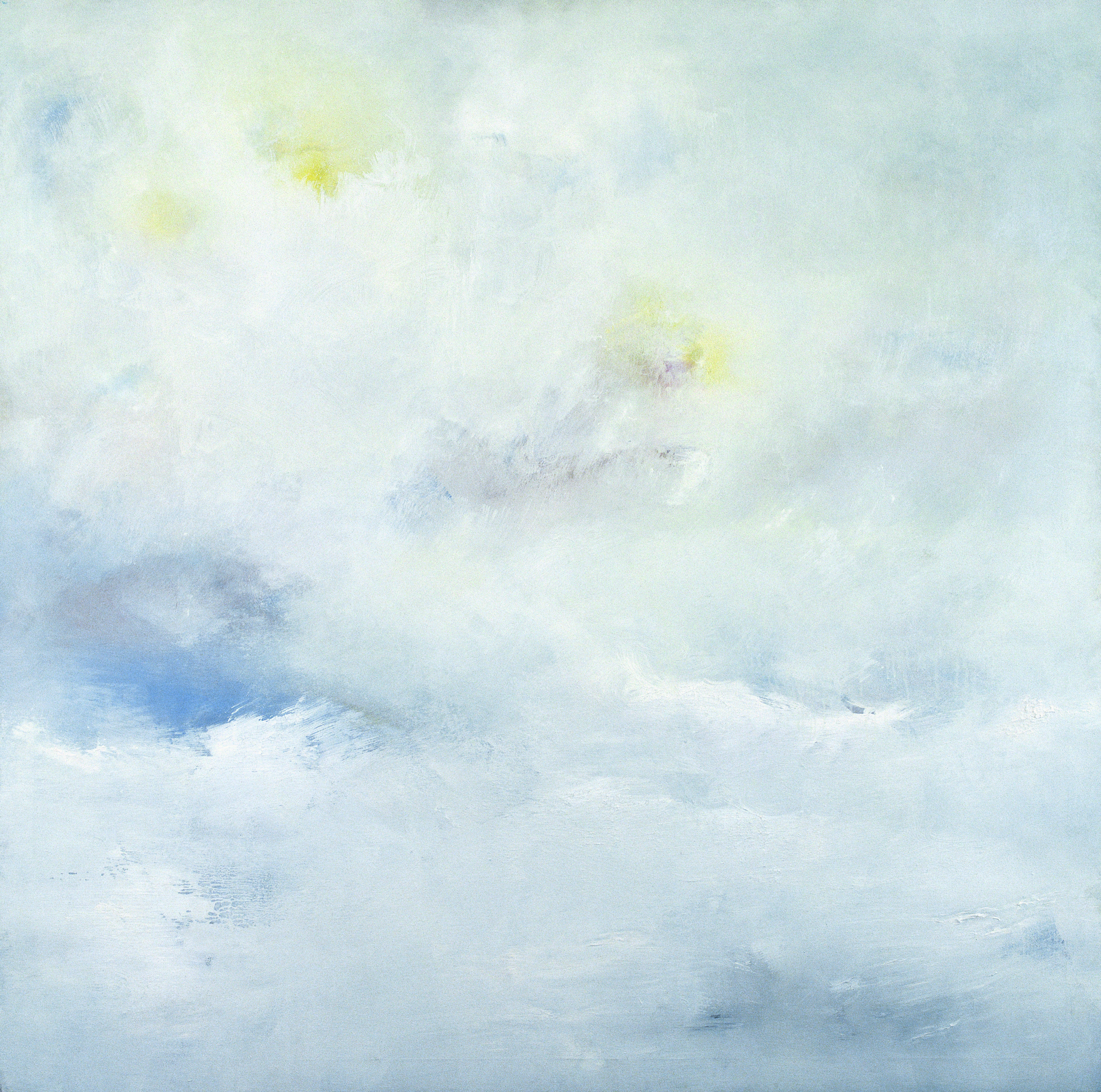
Die Nebensonnen from the picture cycle Winterreise after Franz Schubert 1996, oil on canvas, 160 × 160 cm

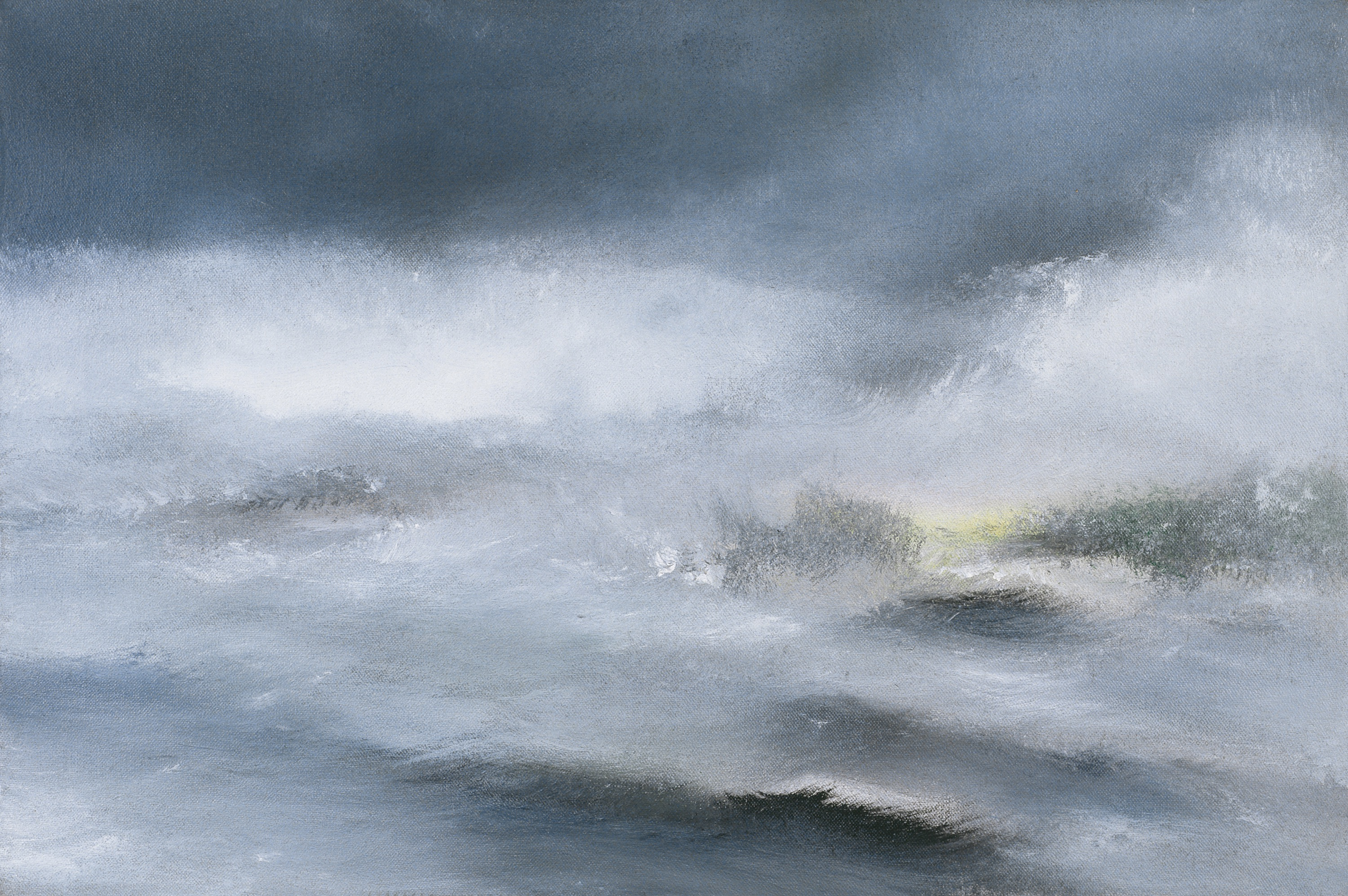
Gletscher (Beagle-Kanal) from the picture cycle Landschaften am Ende der Welt, painted in Punta Arenas 2005, oil on cotton, 40 × 60 cm

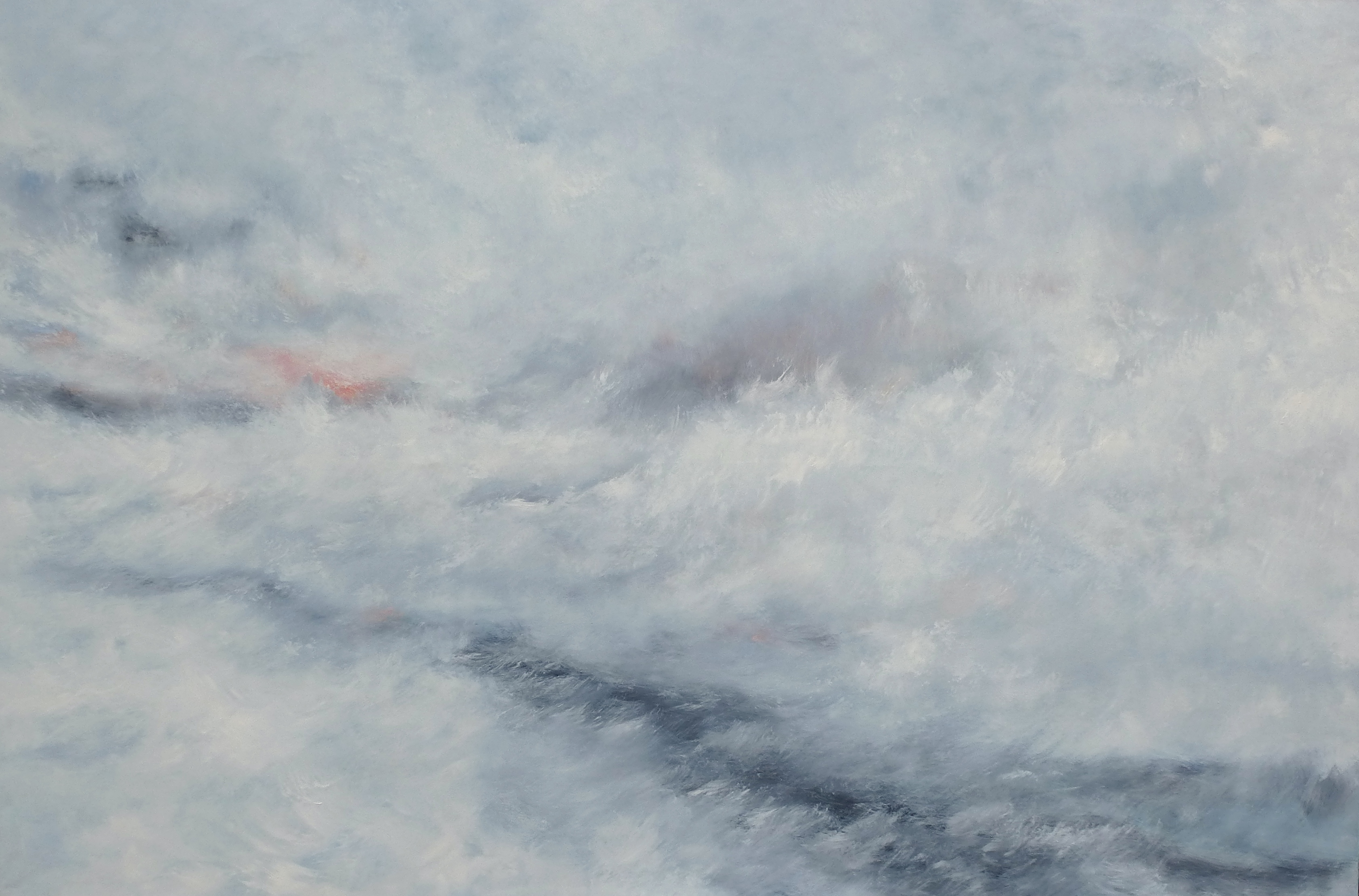
Zwischen Himmel und Erde 2008, oil on cotton, 200 × 300 cm, Schleswig-Holsteinische Landesmuseen, Schloss Gottorf, Schleswig

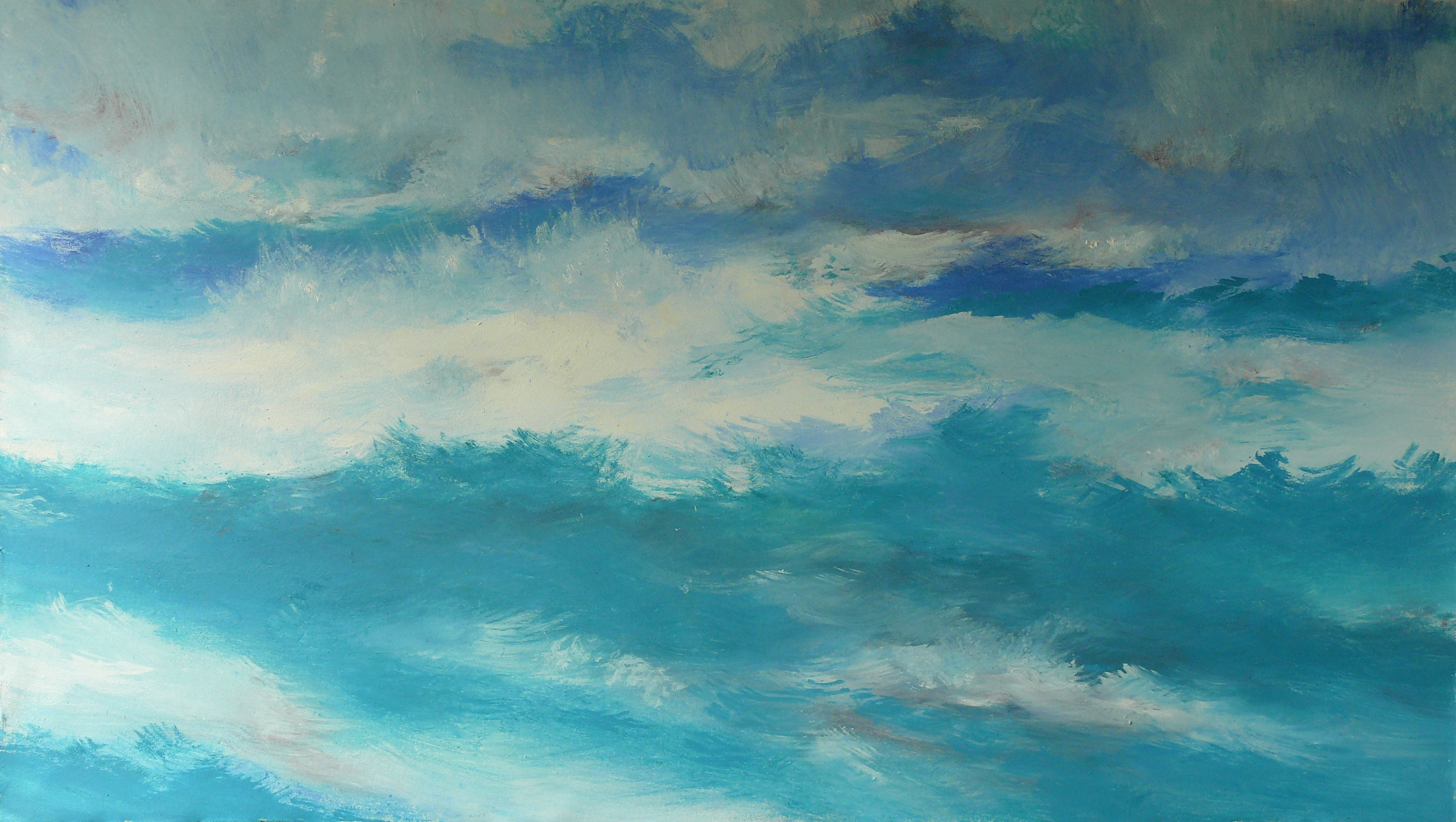
The Sea IV 2012, oil on canvas, 101 × 182 cm, painted in Vanuatu

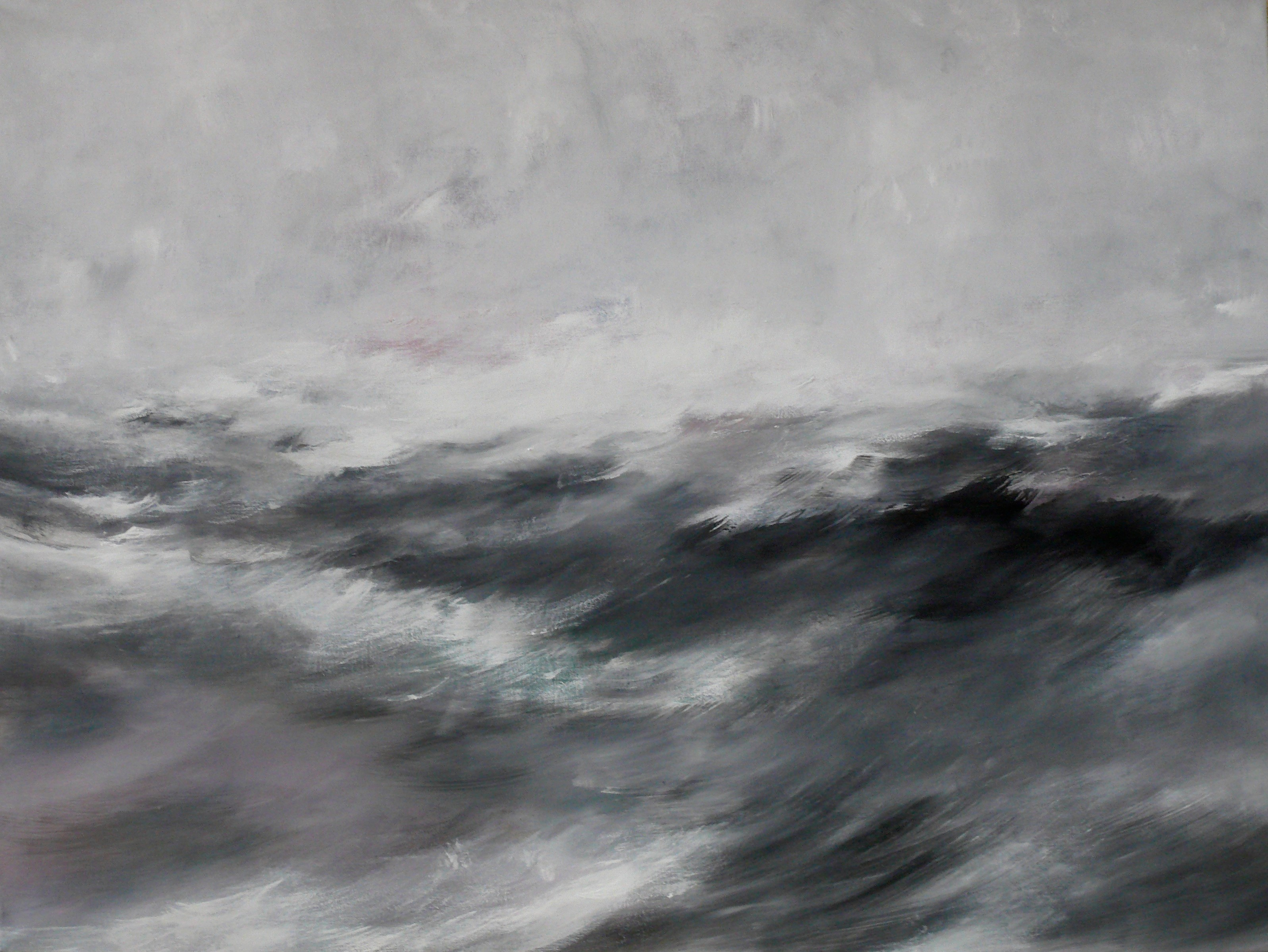
Seebild 2014, oil on canvas, 150 × 200 cm

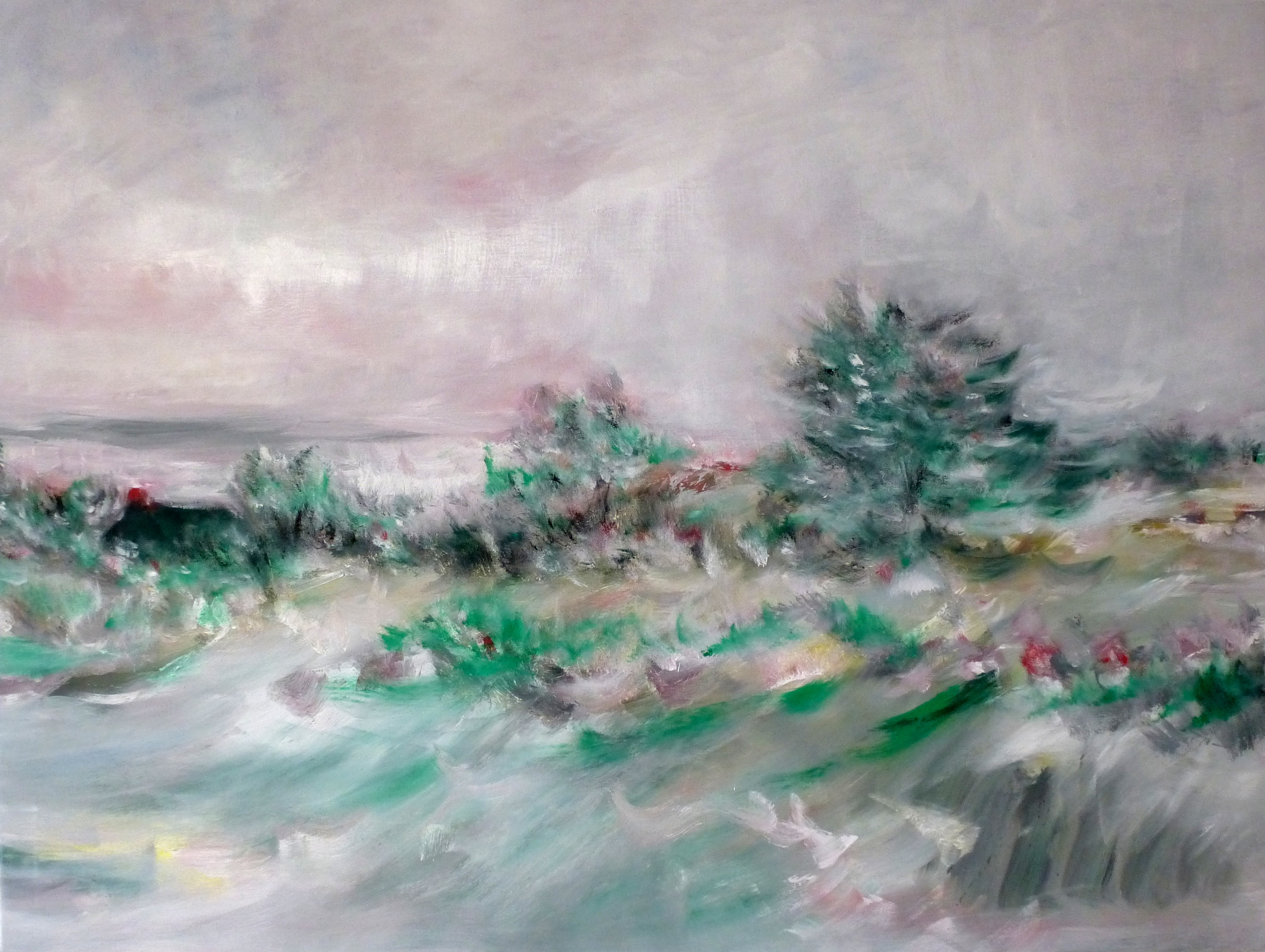
Haus am Watt 2015, oil on canvas, 150 × 200 cm

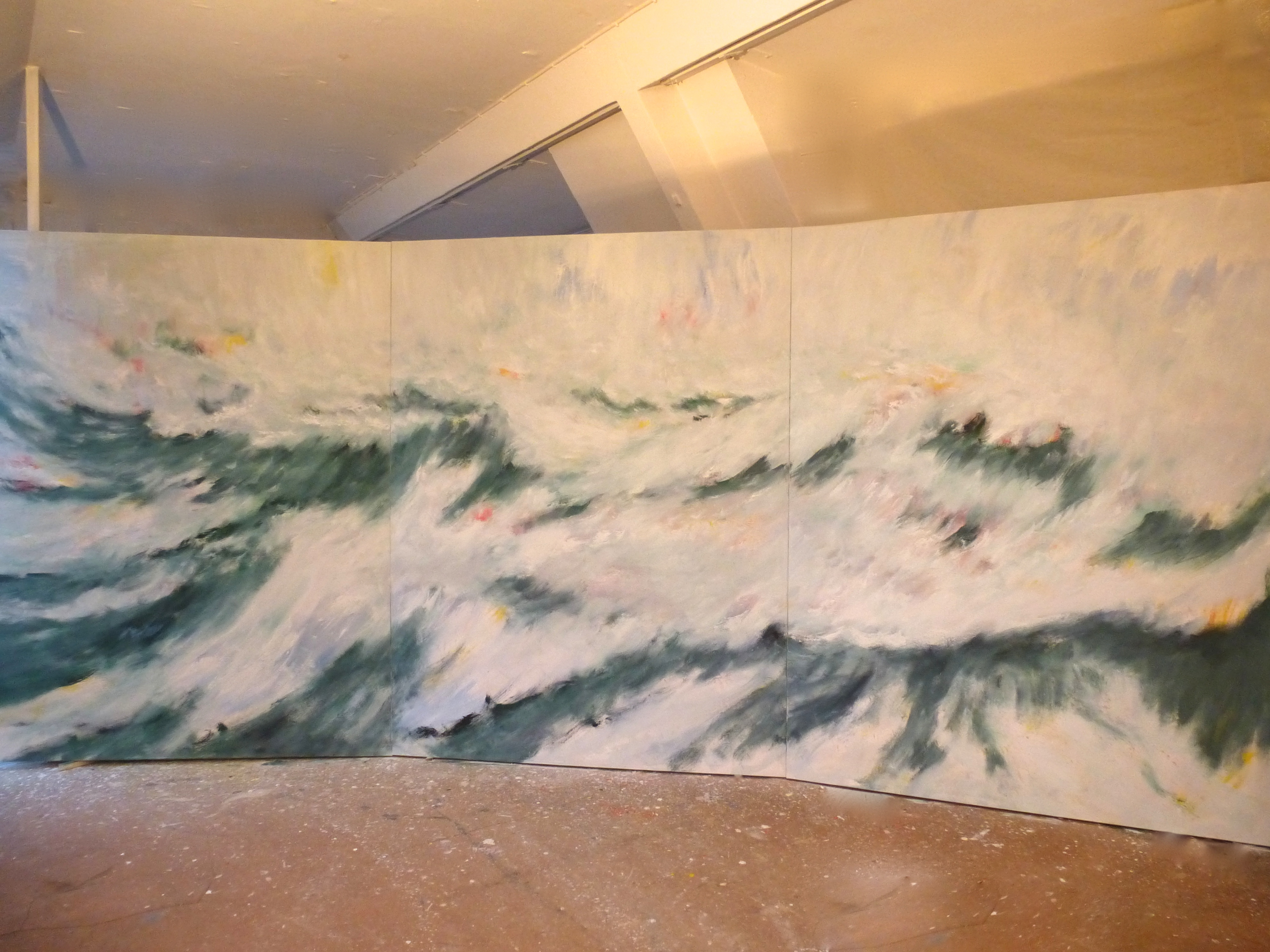
Bewegtes Meer III 2020, oil on canvas, 250 × 570 cm (three-part), in the Berlin studio

=== Sculptural works ===
Since 1986 he has been making sculptures in clay and plaster based on his drawings on the subject of architecture fantasies, one of them was cast in bronze in the art foundry Hermann Noack in 1988. It served as a model for an accessible, unfinished and temporary architectural sculpture The Eighth Day on the Obermarkt in Görlitz (1996) as well as for several casts in plaster, acrystal and zellan. Furthermore, he created eight colored reliefs of clay on the subject of Beatitudes of the Sermon on the Mount for the senior citizens' home next to the Christ Church in Görlitz (1997) and the five-part series West Coast, inspired by the West Coast of New Zealand. In 2008 three Architectural Sculptures entitled Raum – die ganze Stadt (Space – The Whole City) were cast in bronze. An enlarged version of the Architecture Sculpture of 1988 was produced in 2009 (on a scale of 5: 1) and shown in the exhibition Art on the Beach in Rantum on Sylt. In 2010 in Keitum on Sylt he created together with Tomulopa Deko from Papua New Guinea two carved and colored sculptures Wedding Chairs in the form of Kundu drums. In 2019 the bronze relief Boat in a moving sea was created.

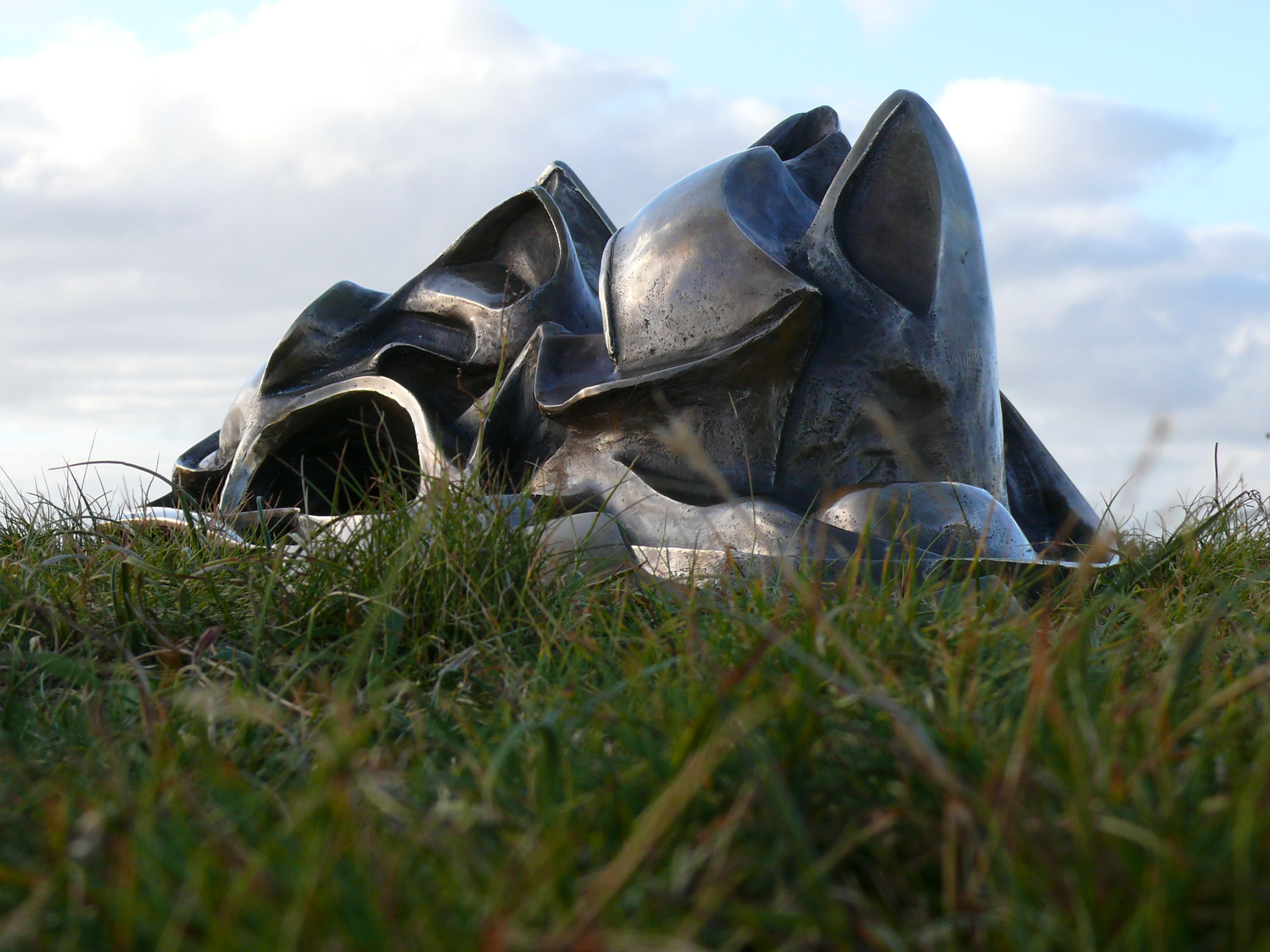
Architektur-Skulptur, 1988, bronze, 69 × 35 × 20 cm

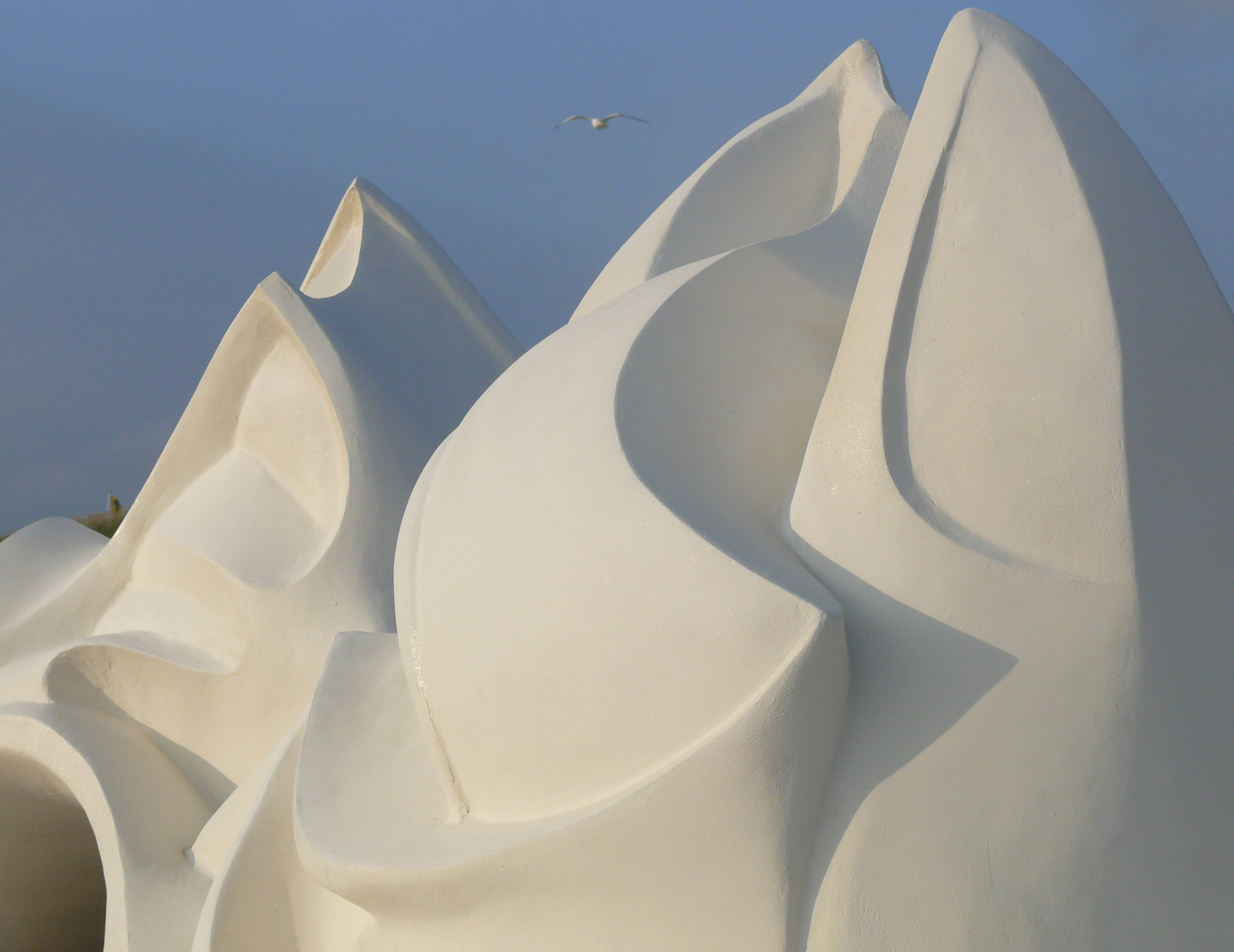
Architektur-Skulptur, 2009, Epoxidharz, 400 × 220 × 110 cm

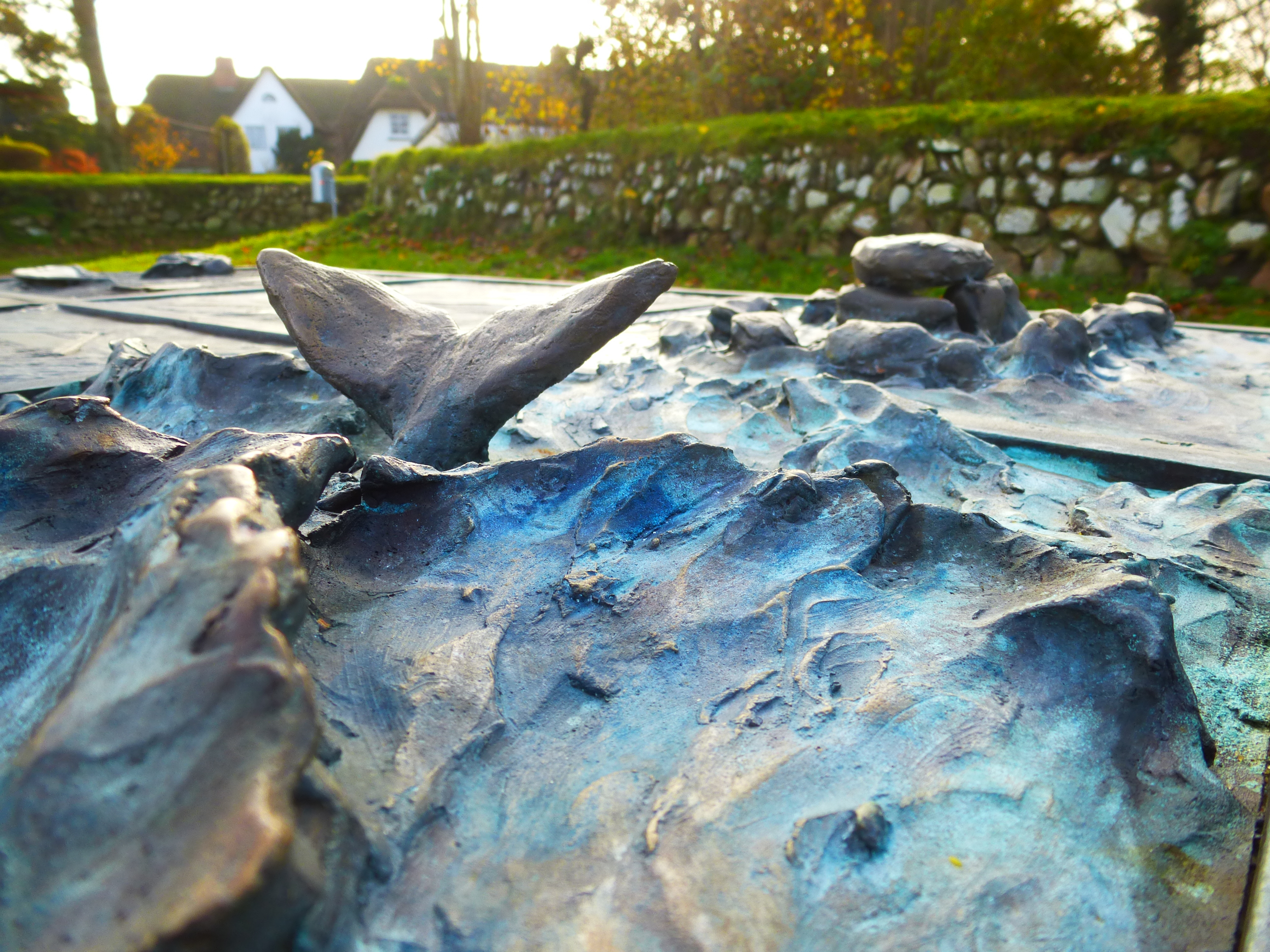
Tisch am Kliff in Keitum / Sylt, bronze reliefs, Wal in bewegter See and Hügelgrab, 2019

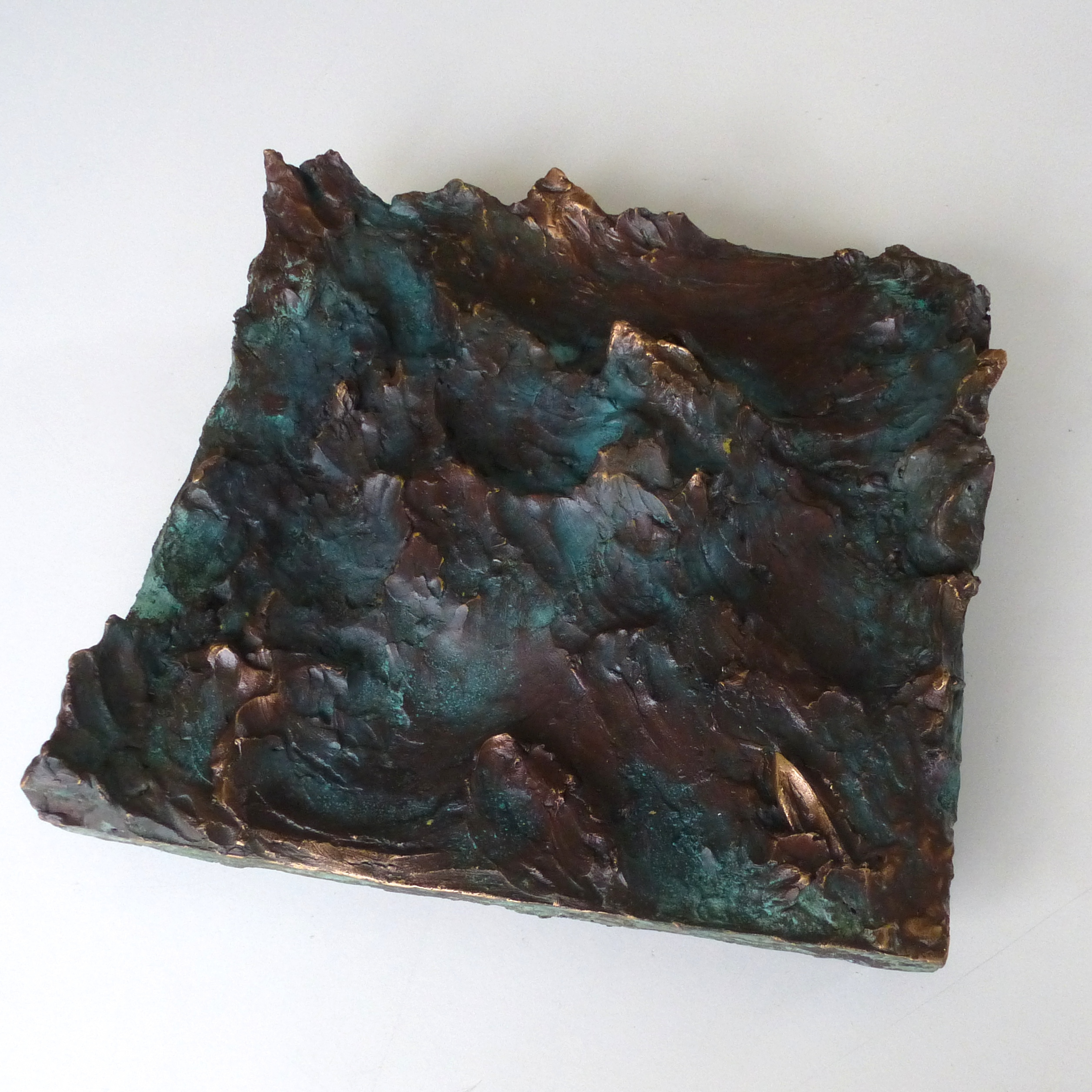
Boot in bewegter See, 2019, bronze relief, 31 × 31 × 8 cm

=== Graphics ===
Engineering- and architectural drawings were followed by studies according to the Old and New Masters and things from the visible world. The graphic work includes drawings, works oil on paper, watercolors, lithographs and etchings. He published graphics, for example in the "Vor Island" ("Before Iceland") map, which he produced before traveling to Iceland.

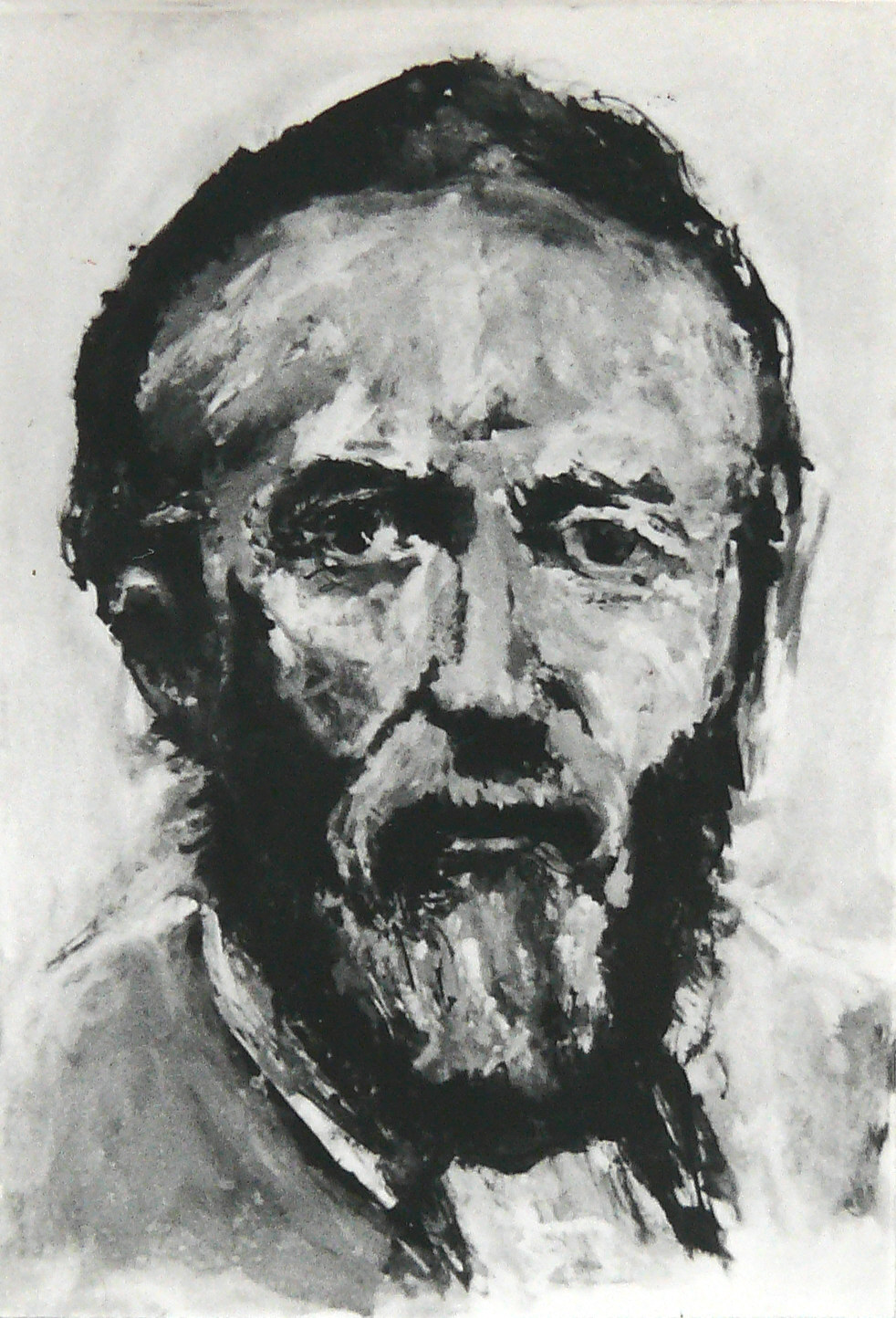
Theodor Storm, 1980 drawing, pastel chalk on paper, 30 × 21 cm

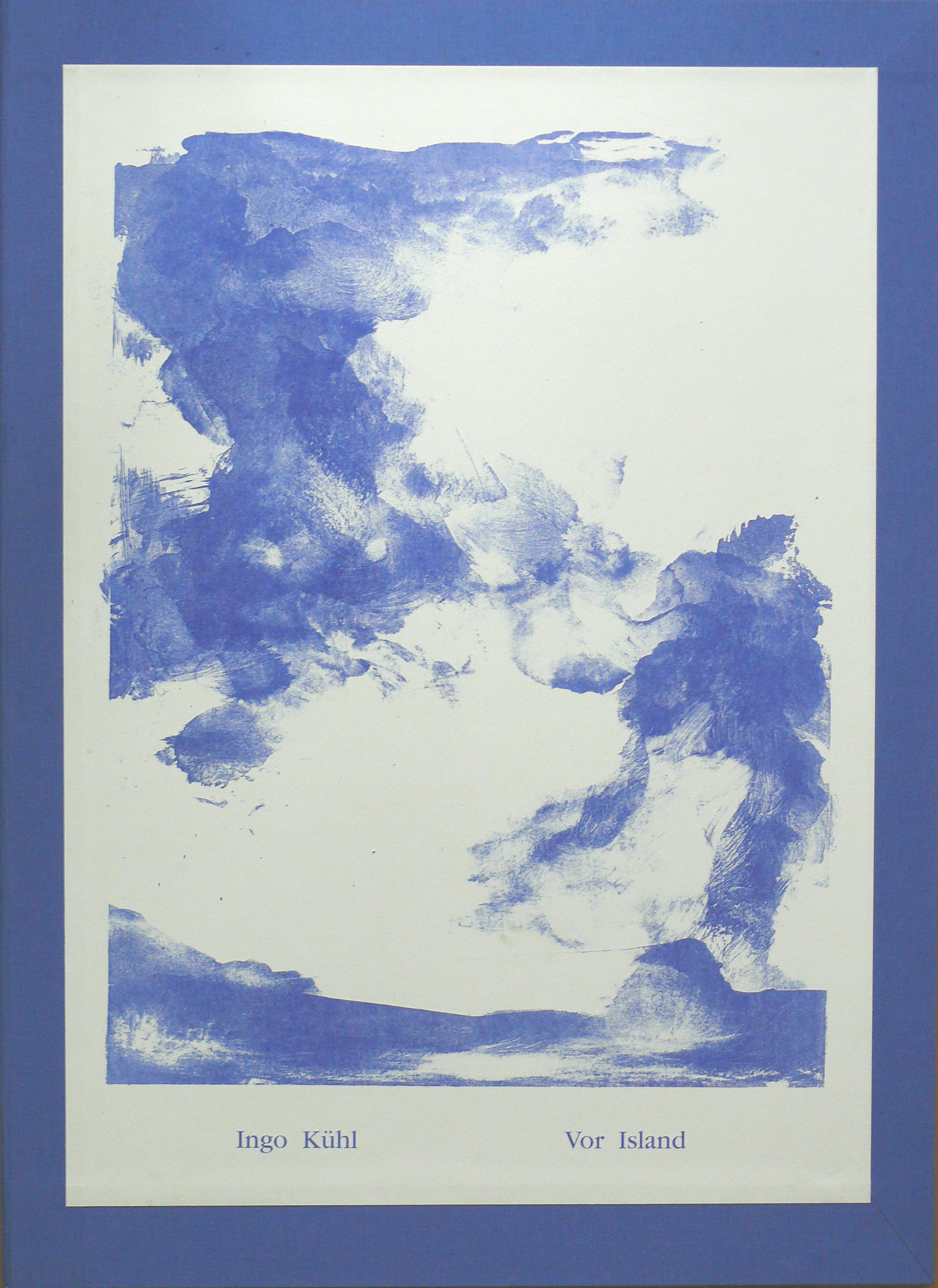
Vor Island, 1996, cover of the map with 5 color lithographs

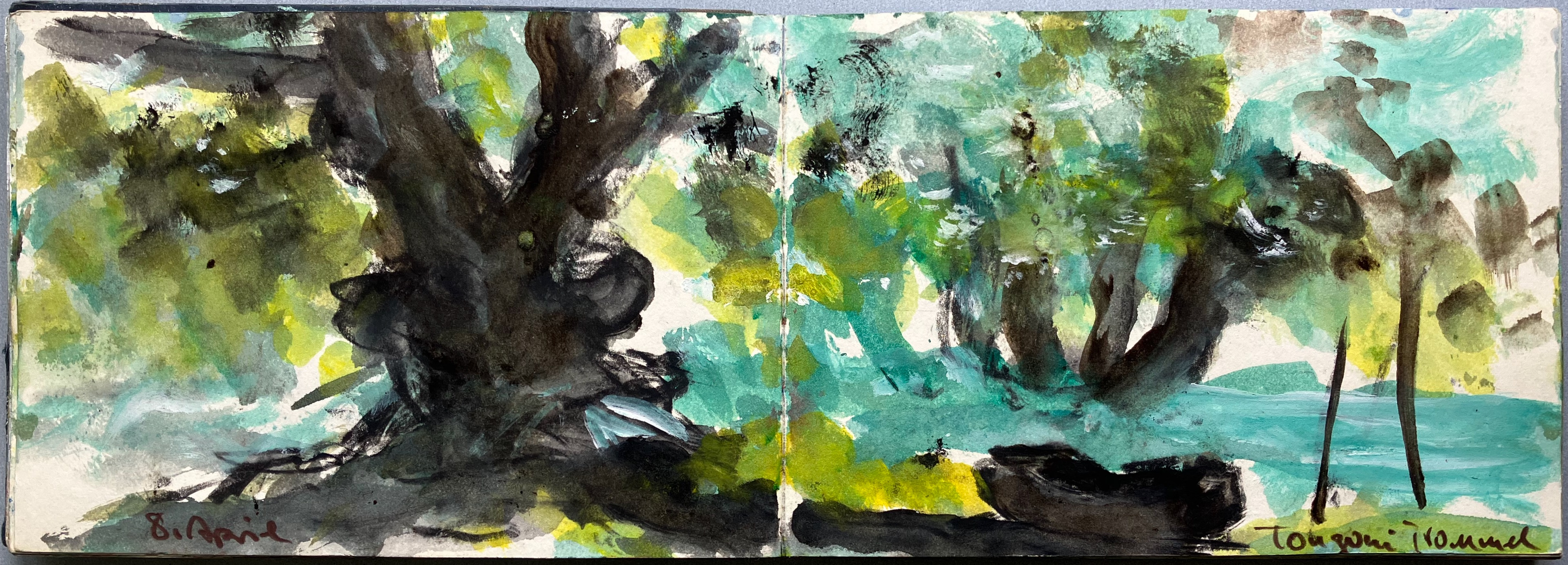
Tongoni Trommel / Tongoni drum, 2002, watercolor, sketchbook “South Seas III", painted on the island of Kadavu, Fiji

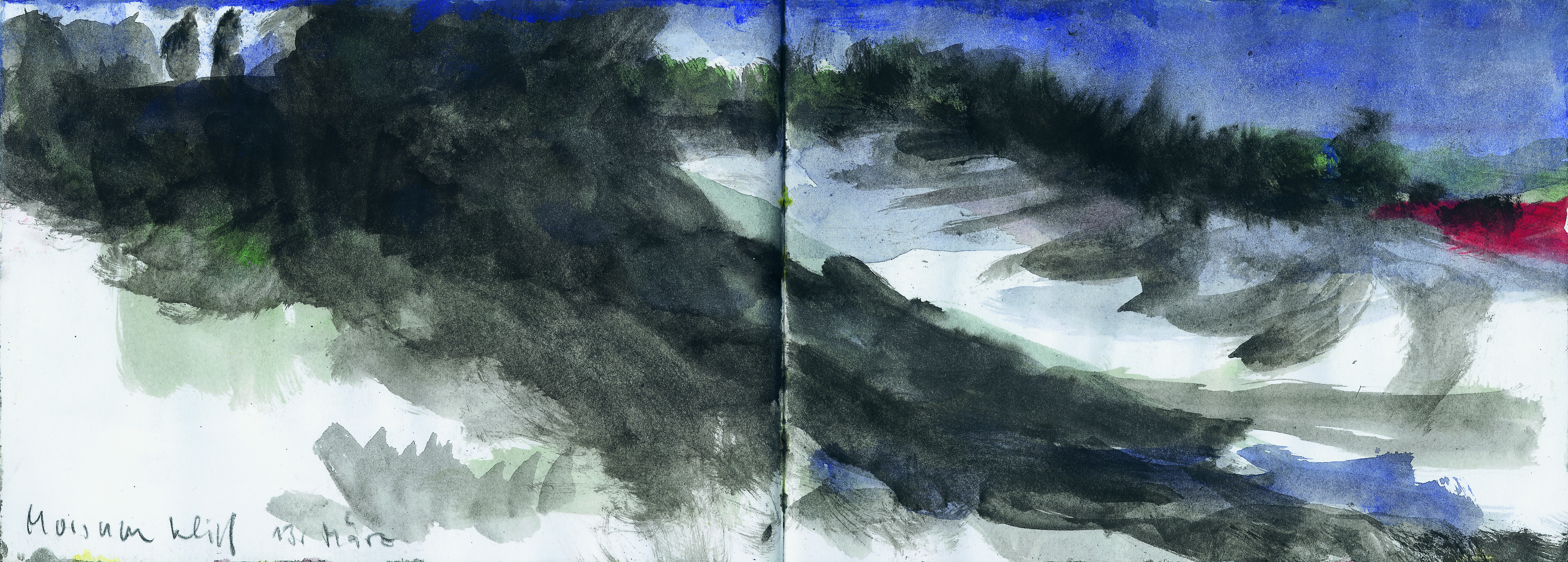
Morsum Kliff, 2003, watercolor, sketchbook "Sylt"

=== Signature ===
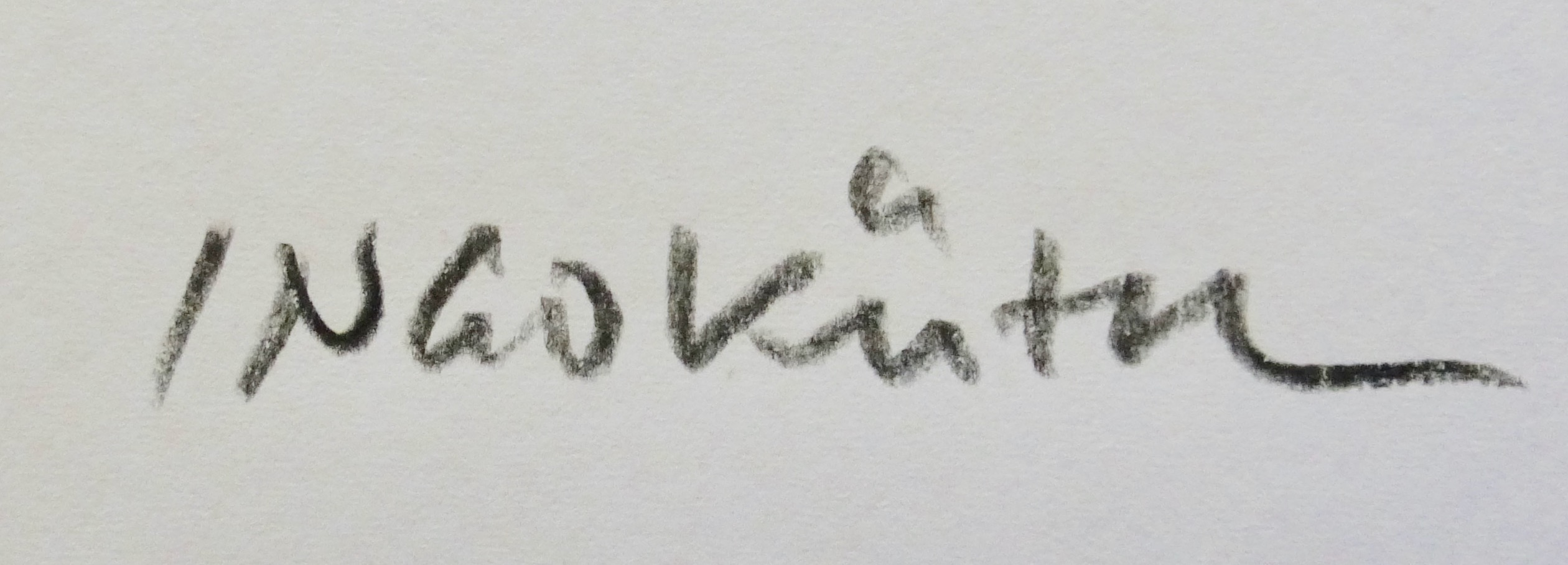

Oil paintings are usually signed on the back (and provided with a catalog raisonné number), while works on paper are signed, numbered and dated on the front and prints under the motif. The signature is engraved on sculptures.

== Exhibitions (selection) ==
=== Solo exhibitions ===
- Architektur-Phantasien, Hochschule der Künste Berlin, 1981.
- Zeichnungen 1976–81, Hochschule der Künste Berlin, 1982.
- Figures and Formkomposits, The Center for Art and Culture of Bedford–Stuyvesant Inc., Brooklyn, New York, 1982.
- Óleos, Centro Cultural São Lourenço, Almancil, Portugal, 1986.
- Luft und Wasser, Nordfriesisches Museum, Nissenhaus, Husum, 1988.
- Himmel, Kardinal-von-Galen-Haus, Cloppenburg-Stapelfeld, 1995.
- Winterreise nach Franz Schubert, Sender Freies Berlin (SFB), Haus des Rundfunks (1996) and Philharmonie, Berlin 1997.
- A velha ponte de madeira da Quinta do Lago, Centro Cultural São Lourenço, Almancil, Portugal, 1998.
- Paisagens marinhas, Centro Cultural São Lourenço, Almancil, 2001.
- La Mer, Espace Culturel Français, Port Vila, Vanuatu, South Pacific, 2002.
- Dance – Masks – Ceremonies, National Museum of Vanuatu, Port Vila, 2002.
- Südseewellen, Ethnologisches Museum, Staatliche Museen zu Berlin, Museen Dahlem, 2004/05.
- Macht der Natur, Museum der Stadt Bad Hersfeld, 2005.
- Paisajes del fin del Mundo, 1. Cooperativa de Arte, Santiago de Chile, 2005.
- The Creation / Die Schöpfung, University of Goroka, Papua New Guinea, 2010.
- Rund um Kap Hoorn, Botschaft der Republik Chile, Berlin, 2013/14.
- In der Nähe des Meeres, Galerie Hovestadt, Nottuln, 2014/2015.
- In der Nähe des Meeres, Nordfriesland Museum, Nissenhaus, Husum, 2018.
- Meeresnah, Sparkassenstiftung Schleswig-Holstein, Kiel, 2018.
- In der Nähe des Meeres, Galerie Kairos, Berlin, 2019.
- Weltrand – Aquarelle, Ölbilder und Skulpturen von Ingo Kühl, Stadtgalerie Alte Post, Westerland / Sylt, 2019.
- Kraft der Elemente auf Sylt, Sylt Museum, Keitum, 2022.
- Ode an das Meer, Stadtgalerie Alte Post, Westerland / Sylt, 2023.
- Winterreise, Kestner Gesellschaft, Hannover, 2024.
- Vom Widerhall ferner Ebenen, Haus Martfeld, Schwelm, 2024.

=== Participations ===
- FBK, Freie Berliner Kunstausstellung, Berlin, 1981, '83, '87, '92, '93, '95.
- Hommage (à Hermann Finsterlin), Obere Galerie – Haus am Lützowplatz, Kunstamt Tiergarten, Berlin, with Richard Hamilton, Pablo Picasso, Niki de Saint Phalle, Wolf Vostell, Paul Wunderlich among others 1984 and Tod und Leben, with Waldemar Grzimek, Carl Hofer, Käthe Kollwitz, Alfred Kubin, Heinrich Richter-Berlin, Georges Rouault, Ludmila Seefried-Matějková among others 1986.
- Villa Massimo Applications for the Rom Stipend, Schleswig-Holsteinisches Landesmuseum, Schloss Gottorf, Schleswig, 1988 and Wilhelm-Hack-Museum, Ludwigshafen / Rhein, 1991.
- Arte Contemporânea – Colecção Marie e Volker Huber, with João Cutileiro, José de Guimarães, Antoni Tàpies, Günter Grass, Wolf Vostell, Rainer Wölzl, Corneille among others, Convento Espírito Santo, Loulé, Portugal, 1989.
- Arte Europeia Contemporânea – Colecção Marie e Volker Huber, with João Cutileiro, José de Guimarães, Günter Grass, Heribert C. Ottersbach, Blek le Rat among others, Antigo mercado municipal de Portimão, Portugal, 1993.
- Art scramble, Galerie Michael Schultz, with Ilja Heinig, Helge Leiberg, Cornelia Schleime among others, Berlin 1998.
- Neuerwerbungen und Bilder aus dem Bestand des Söl'ring Foriining, with Albert Aereboe, Franz Korwan among others, Sylter Heimatmuseum (since 2019 named Sylt Museum, Keitum / Sylt, 2003.
- Westkunst I - Kunst aus Nordfriesland - heute, Messe Husum & Congress, Husum 2014.
- Land, Stadt, Land – Blicke auf Berlin und Brandenburg – Bilder aus der Sammlung des Rundfunk Berlin-Brandenburg, Art gallery Altes Rathaus, Fürstenwalde, with Christo, Klaus Fußmann, Harald Metzkes, Arno Mohr among others, 2016.
- Rendezvous!, Sylter Heimatmuseum (since 2019 named Sylt Museum), with Carl Christian Feddersen, Wenzel Hablik, Horst Janssen, Boy Lornsen, Magnus Weidemann, Edda Raspé, Dieter Röttger, Siegward Sprotte, Helene Varges and Hans-Jürgen Westphal, Keitum / Sylt, 2018.
- Felsenküste – Azoren, Schleswig-Holsteinisches Landesmuseum, Norddeutsche Galerie / North German Gallery, Schloss Gottorf, Schleswig, with almost 150 exhibits from the museum's holdings from the time of the First World War to the present day, including works by Käthe Kollwitz, Emil Nolde, Ernst Barlach, Wenzel Hablik, Oskar Kokoschka, Karl Hartung, Jonathan Meese and the North German realists around Nikolaus Störtenbecker, 2018-2023.
- H2O, Galerie Michael W. Schmalfuss, Contemporary Fine Arts, Berlin 2020/2021.
- Kunstschaffen, Robbe & Berking, Flensburg, with Klaus Fussmann, Jan de Weryha-Wysoczański among others, 2021.
- “Mal doch!“ Andreas Dirks (1865–1922), Sylt Museum, Keitum / Sylt, Andreas Dirks with Eugen Dücker, Theodor von Hagen, Leopold Graf von Kalckreuth, Wilhelm Schneider-Didam, Alexander Essfeld and Ingo Kühl, 2022.
- Glanzstücke. Bilder aus der Sammlung, Sylt Museum, Keitum / Sylt, with Otto Eglau, Carl Christian Feddersen, Martin Frost, Willem Grimm, Hugo Köcke, Siegward Sprotte, Will Sohl, Helene Varges, Wolfgang Werkmeister among others, 2023.
- Haus am Watt, Sylt Museum, Keitum / Sylt, 2024/2025.

== Public collections (selection) ==
- Akademie der Künste Berlin.
- Berlinische Galerie, Berlin.
- Schleswig-Holsteinisches Landesmuseum, Schloss Gottorf, Schleswig.
- Nordfriesland Museum, Nissenhaus, Husum.
- National Museum of Vanuatu, Port Vila, Vanuatu.
- University of Goroka, Papua New Guinea.
- Sylt Museum, Keitum, Project Table on the Cliff.
- Sparkassenstiftung Schleswig-Holstein, Kiel.

== Bibliography (selection) ==
=== Catalogues and books by Ingo Kühl ===
- Architektur-Phantasien, Silkscreen prints, hand-colored, texts by Curt Grützmacher and Ingo Kühl, 1981.
- Zeichnungen 1976–81, exhibition catalogue, Zentrale Hochschulbibliothek of the Hochschule der Künste Berlin, No. 1–99 with Original-Drawing, 1982.
- Nordsee-Bilder 1980–1983, No. 1–20 with an Original picture, 1983.
- Hommage à Hermann Finsterlin. In: Exhibition catalogue Kunstimpulse II – Hommage – Künstler zu Werken von Künstlern, p. 10, Obere Galerie – Haus am Lützowplatz, Berlin 1984.
- Paul Scheerbart Ingo Kühl Glasarchitektur, Texts Paul Scheerbart (1914) and Curt Grützmacher (editor), with 48 Silkscreen prints by Ingo Kühl, 1988.
- Sarah Kirsch Ingo Kühl Luft und Wasser – Gedichte und Bilder’', Edition Heinz Ludwig Arnold, Steidl Verlag Göttingen, 1988 ISBN 3-88243-096-6.
- Gezeiten. In: Ingo Kühl Gezeiten 1989–1990, with a foreword by Curt Grützmacher, Berlin 1992. Republished in: Ingo Kühl – Auf dem Weg ins Unbekannte. p. 52, Kettler Kunst, Bönen 2007, ISBN 978-3-939825-32-6.
- Winterreise – 24 Bilder zum gleichnamigen Liederzyklus von Franz Schubert – nach Gedichten von Wilhelm Müller – gemalt nach der Interpretation von Barry McDaniel, Gesang – Jonathan Alder, Klavier, Text Margret Schütte, Berlin 1996.
- Seligpreisungen der Bergpredigt – colored Lithographs by Ingo Kühl, Berlin 1997.
- Färöer – Bilderzyklus 15 Aquarelle · 9 Ölbilder, Berlin 1998.
- Sea and Sky, exhibition catalogue, Galeria de Arte Vale do Lobo, Algarve, Portugal, Loulé 2002.
- Nordsee – Südsee. Ölbilder · Arbeiten auf Papier · Tonreliefs 2002–2003, Texts by Maria-Gesine Thies and Markus Schindlbeck, exhibition catalogue Südsee-Wellen – Bilder von Ingo Kühl at the Ethnologisches Museum, Berlin, 2004, ISBN 3-86530-001-4.
- Macht der Natur – Bilder von Ingo Kühl auf Sylt gemalt, 2005, ISBN 3-7793-1097-X.
- Landschaften am Ende der Welt – Bilder von Ingo Kühl in Patagonien und Feuerland gemalt / Paisajes del fin del mundo – Cuadros de Ingo Kühl pintados en la Patagonia y Tierra del Fuego, Texts Antonio Skármeta and Ingo Kühl, Berlin 2006.
- Auf dem Weg ins Unbekannte – Monografie mit Werkverzeichnis der Ölbilder 1978–2007, with texts by Curt Grützmacher, Antonio Skármeta, Heinz Spielmann among others and poems by Sarah Kirsch, 2007, ISBN 978-3-939825-32-6.
- Skizzenbuch Neuseeland – Südsee – Peru, 2007, ISBN 978-3-939825-51-7.
- Ars Borealis – Edition zur Zeitgenössischen Kunst im Norden – Ingo Kühl Sylt, with Texts by Heinz Spielmann, Traugott Giesen, Petra Reiber and Rainer W. Ernst, Sparkassenstiftung Schleswig-Holstein, Kiel 2009.
- Papua New Guinea, Text by Ingo Kühl (German / English), 2011, ISBN 978-3-86206-122-8.
- Architectural Fantasies with Texts by Heinz Spielmann, Rainer W. Ernst and Ingo Kühl and catalogues raisonné of the drawings, paintings, sculptures (German / English) 2015, ISBN 978-3-86206-470-0.
- Das Haus am Watt, Edition Schöne Bücher, 2015, ISBN 978-3-86206-484-7.
- In der Nähe des Meeres – Monografie und Werkverzeichnis der Ölbilder 2007–2017 with texts by Heinz Spielmann, Bernd Brandes-Druba and Uwe Haupenthal. Supplement to the monograph "Auf dem Weg ins Unbekannte" (2007), published on the occasion of an exhibition held at Nordfriesland Museum, Nissenhaus Husum, 22 April – 17 June 2018, Verlag Kettler, Dortmund 2018, ISBN 978-3-86206-693-3.
- The Wise Tree, text by Behzad Nashat, illustrated by Ingo Kühl, 2019, also published in German and French, ISBN 978-3-89468-291-0.
- Sylt literarisch „An diesem erschütternden Meere habe ich tief gelebt“ with watercolors by Ingo Kühl, published by Werner Irro, 2021, ISBN 978-3-8319-0806-6.
- Kraft der Elemente auf Sylt. Bilder von Ingo Kühl und Märchen der Welt, erzählt von Linde Knoch, 2022, ISBN 978-3-8319-0805-9.
- Tagebuch eines Malers, biography of Ingo Kühl published by Werner Irro, 2023, ISBN 978-3-98741-065-9.

=== Writings about Ingo Kühl ===
- Heinz Ohff: "Architektur-Phantasien" von Ingo Kühl. In: Der Tagesspiegel, Berlin, 21 March 1982.
- Curt Grützmacher: Ingo Kühl Von der Nordseelandschaft zum Farbraum. In: Werkstattbesuche bei Künstlern in Berlin-Wedding, p. 25, FAB Verlag, Berlin 1989, ISBN 3-927551-03-1.
- Heinz Spielmann: Ingo Kühl Farbraum 1986. In: Jahrbuch des Schleswig-Holsteinischen Landesmuseums, Schloss Gottorf, Band II 1988–1989, p. 288, Wachholtz Verlag, Neumünster 1990, ISBN 978-3-529-02752-9.
- Gisela Weimann: Ingo Kühl. In: Ein Paradox zieht Kreise – Das Lebendige Museum wird zur Institution, Galerie Lebendiges Museum, Berlin 1990.
- Karl Waldeback: Visitor Artist exhibits in Port Vila In: Trading Post, Port Vila, Vanuatu, 9 June 2002.
- Marisol Retamal: Artista aleman llego a la zona para captar los paisajes australes. In: La Prensa Austral, Punta Arenas, Chile, 16 November 2005.
- Andrea Rohmann: Architektur-Phantasien. Auf dem Weg ins Unbekannte. In: "Sylt Coordinates" No. 6, pp. 28–33, HC-Verlag Rohmann Jensen, Reinbeck 2010, ISSN 1865-9071.
- Ute Jung-Kaiser: "... das Irren in einem Winter". Die endlos Wandernden – Der Leiermann in der Bildenden Kunst. In: Der Sänger Franz Schubert – Seelische Virtuosität in Text, Musik und Bild, pp. 200–201 + pp. 210–212 (Illustrations), Lit Verlag, Berlin 2013, ISBN 978-3-643-11701-4.
- Thomas Gädeke: Wolkenbogen ziehen krönend – Sylt in der Malerei der Gegenwart. In: Sylt – entdecken, erleben genießen. pp. 91–93, Ellert & Richter Verlag, Hamburg 2015, ISBN 978-3-8319-0601-7.

=== Articles about Ingo Kühl in encyclopedias ===
- Wer ist wer? Das Deutsche Who's Who, Verlag Schmidt-Römhild, Lübeck, since 1990.
- Kürschners Handbuch der Bildenden Künstler, 2 volumes, p. 615, De Gruyter Saur Verlag, München, since 2007, ISBN 978-3-598-24737-8.
- Das neue Sylt Lexikon, published by Harry Kunz and Thomas Steensen, p. 210, Wachholtz Verlag, Neumünster 2007, ISBN 978-3-529-05518-8.
- Taschenlexikon Sylt, published by Harry Kunz and Thomas Steensen, p. 210, Wachholtz Verlag, Neumünster/Hamburg 2014, ISBN 978-3-529-05525-6.
- Nordfriesland. Menschen von A-Z, by Thomas Steensen, pp. 244–245, Publisher: Nordfriesland Museum. Nissenhaus Husum, 2020, ISBN 978-3-96717-027-6.
- Allgemeines Künstlerlexikon – Internationale Künstlerdatenbank online, (AKL), De Gruyter Saur Verlag.
