= Magnus Weidemann =

Magnus Weidemann (1880-1967) was a German painter, graphic artist, photographer and writer. He was a co-founder of naturism in the life reform.

== Selected exhibitions ==
=== Solo exhibitions ===
- 1941: Altonaer Museum, Hamburg.
- 1941: Grenzlandmuseum (at the Heinrich-Sauermann-Haus), Kunstverein Flensburg.
- 1950: Nissenhaus, Husum.
- 1990: Kleinkunst im Buchdeckel – Exlibris von Magnus Weidemann, Akademie am Meer, Volkshochschule Klappholttal, List on Sylt.
- 2008: Galerie Witt, Hamburg.
- For years there has been a permanent exhibition in the Sylter Heimatmuseum (since 2019 named Sylt Museum), Keitum.

=== Other ===
- 1907: Schwarz-Weiß, exhibition from members of the Schleswig-Holsteinische Kunstgenossenschaft, Kiel, Flensburg and Altona.
- 1925: Jury-free exhibition at the Kunstverein in Hamburg.
- 1932: Altonaer Museum, Hamburg, with Martha Vogeler.
- 1946: Kunstausstellung Kampen auf Sylt, Alte Sturmhaube, with Albert Aereboe, Willy Graba, Ivo Hauptmann, Carl Hilmers, Tom Hops, Alfred Jensen, Albert Johannsen, Fritz Klimsch, Otto Larsen, Herbert Marxen, Franz Radziwill, Friedrich Schaper, Siegward Sprotte among others.
- 1983–1984: Künstlerinsel Sylt, Landesmuseum für Kunst und Kulturgeschichte, Gottorf Castle, Schleswig.
- 2003: Neuerwerbungen und Bilder aus dem Bestand des Söl'ring Foriining, Sylter Heimatmuseum, Keitum, with Albert Aereboe, Andreas Dirks, Otto Eglau, Carl Christian Feddersen, Christian Peter Hansen, Richard Kaiser, Hugo Köcke, Franz Korwan, Ingo Kühl, Walther Kunau, Dieter Röttger, Siegward Sprotte, Helene Varges among others.
- 2003: Sylt in der Malerei, Galerie Herold, Kampen, with Eduard Bargheer, Georg Busse, Andreas Dirks, Ernst Eitner, Christian Peter Hansen, Ivo Hauptmann, Volker Detlef Heydorn, Hugo Köcke, Franz Korwan, Siegward Sprotte among others.
- 2009: Land am Meer, Altonaer Museum, Hamburg.
- 2014: Die Künstler-Insel, Galerie Herold, Kampen, with Ludwig Dettmann, Andreas Dirks, Ernst Eitner, Rainer Fetting, Willem Grimm, Ivo Hauptmann, Erich Heckel, Hugo Köcke, Ernst Kolbe, Franz Korwan, Emil Maetzel, Emil Nolde, Wilhelm Ohm, Anita Rée, Friedrich Schaper among others.
- 2015: Die Kunst und das Wattenmeer – 30 Jahre Nationalpark Wattenmeer, Kunstverein Fischerhude.
- 2015–2016: Die Kunst und das Wattenmeer – 30 Jahre Nationalpark Wattenmeer, Schloss Ritzebüttel, Cuxhaven.
- 2016: Lange nicht gesehen, Sylter Heimatmuseum, Keitum, with Hugo Köcke, Ernst Mollenhauer, Siegward Sprotte among others.
- 2018: Rendezvous!, Sylter Heimatmuseum, Keitum, with Carl Christian Feddersen, Wenzel Hablik, Horst Janssen, Ingo Kühl, Boy Lornsen, Edda Raspé, Dieter Röttger, Siegward Sprotte, Helene Varges and Hans-Jürgen Westphal.

== Selected works ==
Dimensions: Height × Width

- 1919: Klosterkirche von Preetz, pencil on paper, 8,8 × 16 cm, Schleswig-Holsteinische Landesbibliothek
- 1921: Badende, Sylt, painting – Museumsberg Flensburg
- 1924: Ukleisee, oil on canvas – Ostholstein-Museum Eutin
- 1925: Mural Dünen und Watt auf Sylt, Rotes Kliff, Morsum-Kliff, Binnendünen am Rande der Kremper Marsch, Tunneltal bei Ratzeburg – Altonaer Museum, Hamburg
- 1926: Morsumer Heide, oil on wood, 47 × 67 cm – Sylter Heimatmuseum, Keitum
- 1926: Akt am Meer, ink on cardboard, 24,4 × 35 cm – Sylter Heimatmuseum, Keitum
- 1927: Strand vor Westerland, oil on cardboard, 60 × 83 cm (frame dimensions) – Sylter Heimatmuseum, Keitum
- 1927: Dünental, oil on cardboard, 105 × 75 cm – Sylter Heimatmuseum, Keitum
- 1929: Dünen im Schnee, oil on cardboard, 65 × 94,5 cm – Sylter Heimatmuseum, Keitum
- 1929: Heide bei Tauwetter, oil painting, 64 × 94 cm – NordseeMuseum Husum
- 1932: Die Seemannsgräber, painting – NordseeMuseum Husum
- 1933: Düne, oil on cardboard, 23 × 31,5 cm (cardboard 35,5 × 44 cm) – Sylter Heimatmuseum, Keitum
- 1934: Der Harhoog (Abendstimmung), sketch, watercolour on paper, 8,5 × 15 cm – Sylter Heimatmuseum, Keitum
- 1935: Waldweg im Schnee, oil on hardboard, 66 × 41 cm – Sylter Heimatmuseum, Keitum
- 1936: Germaniawerft, oil on cardboard, 50 × 69,5 cm – Stadtmuseum Warleberger Hof, Kiel
- 1938: Kampener Vogelkoje, tempera, lacquer, and topcoat on paper glued to particle board, 55 × 75 cm – Sylter Heimatmuseum, Keitum
- 1938: Biikefeuer auf Keitum, oil on canvas, 72 × 85 cm – NordseeMuseum Husum
- 1938: Nordische Landschaft, Dünental im Winter, oil on cardboard, 20,2 × 29,3 cm – Sylter Heimatmuseum, Keitum
- 1940: Eisstauung bei Keitum, oil on hardboard, 49,5 × 23,5 cm – Sylter Heimatmuseum, Keitum
- 1941: Kirche und Friedhof in Nebel, painting – NordseeMuseum Husum
- 1942: Gräber der unbekannten Seeleute, oil on chipboard, 66,5 × 105 cm – Sylter Heimatmuseum, Keitum
- 1943: Morsum Kliff auf Sylt, oil on cardboard, 51 × 73 cm – Sylter Heimatmuseum, Keitum
- 1944: Weg am Kellersee, watercolour on cardboard, 49,5 × 73 cm – Sylter Heimatmuseum, Keitum
- 1945: Harhoog in Keitum, watercolour on paper, 19 × 42 cm – Sylter Heimatmuseum, Keitum
- 1945: Winterlandschaft an der Förde bei Glücksburg, oil on chipboard, 69 × 55 cm – Museumsberg Flensburg
- 1946: Urwald Kampener Vogelkoje, oil on canvas, 65,5 × 91 cm – Sylter Heimatmuseum, Keitum
- 1946: Sommerglanz (Nordsee), watercolour, backed with cardboard, 23,7 × 30,2 cm – Sylter Heimatmuseum, Keitum
- 1948: Gebäude, das von einem Friesenwall abgegrenzt wird, sketch, watercolour, 15 × 23,5 cm – Sylter Heimatmuseum, Keitum
- 1948: Landschaft mit blühender Heide, sketch, watercolour, 10,5 × 15 cm – Sylter Heimatmuseum, Keitum
- 1949: Keitum Kliff, sketch, watercolour, 10 × 16 cm – Sylter Heimatmuseum, Keitum
- in the 1950s: Hünengrab in der Heide, sketch, watercolour, 11 × 15 cm – Sylter Heimatmuseum, Keitum
- 1953: Schale mit Enzian, watercolour, backed with cardboard, 21 × 24,2 cm – Sylter Heimatmuseum, Keitum
- 1954: Meer an der Kaimauer, watercolour on canvas, 13 × 16,5 cm – Sylter Heimatmuseum, Keitum
- 1955: Sonnenfunken, oil on hardboard, 69 × 52 cm – Sylter Heimatmuseum, Keitum
- 1956: Hünengrab im Schnee, sketch, watercolour, 10,5 × 14,5 cm – Sylter Heimatmuseum, Keitum
- 1957: Strandastern im Schilf, oil on hardboard, 61 × 49 cm – Sylter Heimatmuseum, Keitum
- 1958: Heide auf Sylt, oil on chipboard, 61 × 92 cm – Sylter Heimatmuseum, Keitum
- 1958: Schilf am Watt, oil on canvas, 57 × 76 cm – Sylter Heimatmuseum, Keitum
- 1958: Meereslandschaft, Wattenmeer, oil on chipboard – Sylter Heimatmuseum, Keitum
- 1958: Der Klöwenhoog, sketch, watercolour, 9 × 13 cm – Sylter Heimatmuseum, Keitum
- 1958: Heide bei Munkmarsch, oil on hardboard, 61 × 46 cm – Sylter Heimatmuseum, Keitum
- 1958: Sylt: Keitum – Strand, oil on hardboard, 61 × 40 cm – Sylter Heimatmuseum, Keitum
- 1958: Hoyer-Stieg in Keitum, oil on hardboard, 68,5 × 48,5 cm – Sylter Heimatmuseum, Keitum
- 1958: Watt, watercolour and ballpoint pen on paper, 23,3 × 29,4 cm (frame dimensions) – Sylter Heimatmuseum, Keitum
- 1959: Hünengrab in der Heide bei Munkmarsch, sketch, watercolour, 8 × 11 cm – Sylter Heimatmuseum, Keitum
- 1959: Der (ehemalige) Harhoog, bei Keitum, watercolour and ballpoint pen on paper, backed with cardboard, 21,7 × 30,8 cm – Sylter Heimatmuseum, Keitum
- 1960: Hünengrab bei Keitum, oil on hardboard – Sylter Heimatmuseum, Keitum
- 1960: Der Harhoog in Keitum, watercolour and ballpoint pen on paper, backed with cardboard, 33,8 × 46,3 cm – Sylter Heimatmuseum, Keitum
- 1960: Blühende Felder (auf Sylt), watercolour, 45 × 49 cm – NordseeMuseum Husum
- 1961: Heidetal bei Munkmarsch, oil on hardboard, 68 × 41 cm – Sylter Heimatmuseum, Keitum
- 1963: Dünen- und Heidelandschaft, oil on canvas, 68 × 89 cm – Sylter Heimatmuseum, Keitum
- 1963: Strandastern hinterm Deich, oil on hardboard, 72 × 42 cm – Sylter Heimatmuseum, Keitum
- 1965: Salzwiese mit Priel, oil on hardboard – Sylter Heimatmuseum, Keitum
- 1965: Watt vor Keitum, watercolour and pencil on paper, backed with cardboard, 10,3 × 14,8 cm – Sylter Heimatmuseum, Keitum
- 1966: Goldgras und Heide, oil on hardboard, 61 × 38 cm – Sylter Heimatmuseum, Keitum
