= Albert Aereboe =

German painter

Albert Aereboe (31 January 1889 – 6 August 1970) was a German painter of the modernity.

== Life ==
Born in Lübeck as the son of the pastor at Lübeck Cathedral, Aereboe first attended the Katharineum and the Johanneum, and then in 1906 underwent his training as a craftsman and artist in Berlin.

In 1910, he returned to Lübeck and attended the art school of Leo von Lütgendorff there. On Lütgendorff's recommendation, he went to Munich in 1912 to the Akademie der bildenden Künste and studied with Hugo von Habermann until 1915. In 1916, he was called up for military service. Around 1917, he was commissioned by the well-known violist Karl Reitz to decorate his living room at Holtenauer Straße 59a in Brunswik (Kiel) with murals and integrated paintings, watercolours and drawings to create a landscape. Only photographs of this work have survived. After the war, Aereboe worked as a freelance artist, first in Lübeck, and from 1925 on Sylt. In the meantime, from 1919 to 1926, he led the class for decorative painting at the Staatliche Kunstgewerbeschule in Kassel, where he was awarded the title of professor in 1923. Here he met the painter Julie Katz (1888–1927), who had led the class for textiles since 1919 and became a professor in 1923; they both married in 1922.

One of his outstanding works is My Ancestor Jens Aereboe. Among other things, discussed on the occasion of its exhibition at the Behnhaus under A Monumental Painting by Albert Aereboe in the Lübeckische Anzeigen 13 November 1927. The artist had here painted his ancestor lord, who was a faustian. Like Dürer's Jerome, the latter sits in a housing, albeit a completely Nordic one. Through the window one sees an austere dunescape and raindrops run along the glass. Inside are relationships to mathematics and optics. In the centre is the mentally worked-through face of the ancestor. The suspended glass sphere that intersects the face of "Jens Aereboe" is a symbol that makes itself understood without words. Through the door in the background, wrapped only in a flowing veil, comes a naked female figure. She too is of heightened significance.

In the 1930s he also ran a studio in Berlin, but returned to bombed out Sylt in 1943 and worked exclusively in Lübeck again from 1959. He died in Lübeck. Here he was buried in 1970 in accordance with his last will in the Wenningstedter cemetery.

== Exhibitions (selection) ==
=== Solo exhibitions ===
- Albert Aereboe, St. Anne's Museum Quarter, Lübeck, 1970.
- Albert Aereboe, Kunsthalle Kiel, 1983.
- Im Bann der Insel. Albert Aereboe, Sylter Heimatmuseum, Keitum 2018/2019, (Katalog).

=== Participations ===
- 1929: Große Kunstausstellung, Kunstverein Kassel
- Lübecker Grafik der zwanziger Jahre, with Erich Dummer, Asmus Jessen, Alfred Mahlau, Hans Peters, Waldemar Rosatis, Leopold Thieme, Museum im St.-Annen-Kloster, Lübeck, 1978/1979 and Museumsberg Flensburg 1979.
- Neuerwerbungen und Bilder aus dem Bestand des Söl'ring Foriining, with Andreas Dirks, Otto Eglau, Carl Christian Feddersen, C. P. Hansen, Richard Kaiser, Hugo Köcke, Franz Korwan, Ingo Kühl, Walther Kunau, Dieter Röttger, Siegward Sprotte, Helene Varges, Magnus Weidemann among others, Sylter Heimatmuseum, Keitum / Sylt 2003.

== Awards and honours ==
- 1959: Honorary citizen of Kampen on Sylt
- 1968: Friedrich-Hebbel-Preis (together with Gertrud-Wiebke Schröder)

== Museum presence ==
- Behnhaus Lübeck – Die rote Jacke (1924), Selbstbildnis in der Turmstube des Doms (1924), Das tote Lamm
- Kunsthalle Kiel
- Landesmuseum Schloss Gottorf
