= Franz Korwan =

German painter (1865–1942)

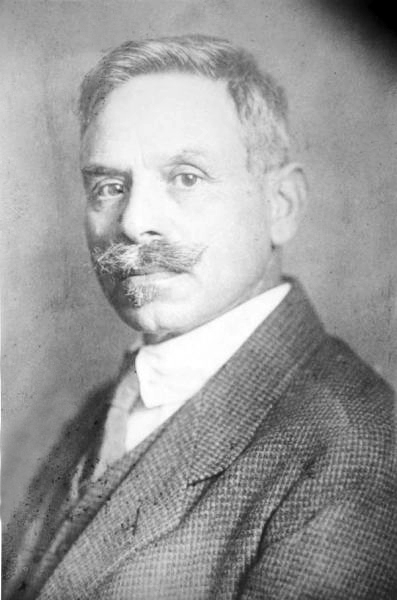
Franz Korwan (1905)

Franz Korwan, born Sally Katzenstein (27 October 1865 – 4 September 1942) was a German-Jewish landscape painter and Kommunalpolitiker (a type of community administrator) on the island of Sylt. He was associated with the Düsseldorfer Malerschule. Sally is the familiar form of Salomon. His name change was legally recognized in 1924.

== Biography ==
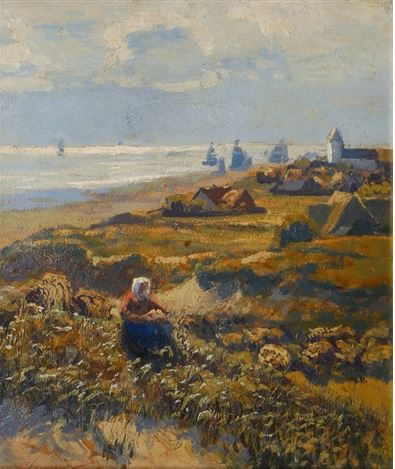
Coastal View on Sylt

He came from a Jewish family that had lived in Heinebach (near Alheim) for several generations. From 1887 to 1889, he studied at the Kunstakademie Düsseldorf with Eugen Dücker. In 1888 he paid his first visit to Sylt with his painting class and came away very impressed. Later, he took study trips to Italy, staying in Florence for an extended period. In the 1890s, he spent two years at the Prussian Academy of Arts as a master student of Eugen Bracht.

He divided his time between Berlin, Hamburg and Westerland, on Sylt. It was there he opened his primary studio, where he held tea parties for affluent spa guests and prominent visitors. He also hosted exhibitions of works, with motifs related to Sylt, in Berlin and Munich. In 1895, he married a local woman named Franziska Achenbach. Eventually, he became involved in local politics there and advocated for full city rights; which were granted in 1905. He was twice elected a councilman, organized and managed the savings bank and sat on the board of the Sylt Steamship Company. Possibly as a result of these activities, at the age of forty-three, in 1908, he converted to Protestantism.

He was also active in promoting tourism; designing numerous posters, postcards and advertising leaflets. In 1920, Franziska divorced him, taking their daughter Erna, with her. The following year, he moved to Keitum, where he opened a new studio in a room attached to the home of his primary patron; the merchant, Julius Saenger. After Saenger's death in 1929, Korwan remained there and lived with his widow, Elsa.

In 1937, he and Elsa left Sylt and moved to Wiesbaden, then to Baden-Baden, with the intention of entering France. It was there, in 1940, that he was arrested by the Gestapo and sent to Gurs internment camp. Later he was transferred to the camp at Noé, Haute-Garonne, where he died in 1942.

Most of his works are now in private collections. Notable public collections may be found on Sylt and at the Museum für Kommunikation Frankfurt. The local history museum in Keitum presented a major retrospective of his work in 2015. A street in Westerland has been named after him.

== Exhibitions (selection) ==
=== Solo exhibitions ===
- Franz Korwan. "Ich gehe schweren Herzens von der Insel …", Sylter Heimatmuseum, today called Sylt Museum, Keitum 2015.

=== Participations ===
- Künstlerinsel Sylt, Schleswig-Holsteinisches Landesmuseum, Schloss Gottorf, Schleswig 1983/84.
- Neuerwerbungen und Bilder aus dem Bestand des Söl'ring Foriining, with Albert Aereboe, Andreas Dirks, Otto Eglau, Carl Christian Feddersen, C. P. Hansen, Hugo Köcke, Ingo Kühl, Dieter Röttger, Siegward Sprotte, Helene Varges, Magnus Weidemann among others, Sylter Heimatmuseum, today called Sylt Museum, Keitum 2003.
