= Ludwig Nissen =

American jeweller (1855–1924)

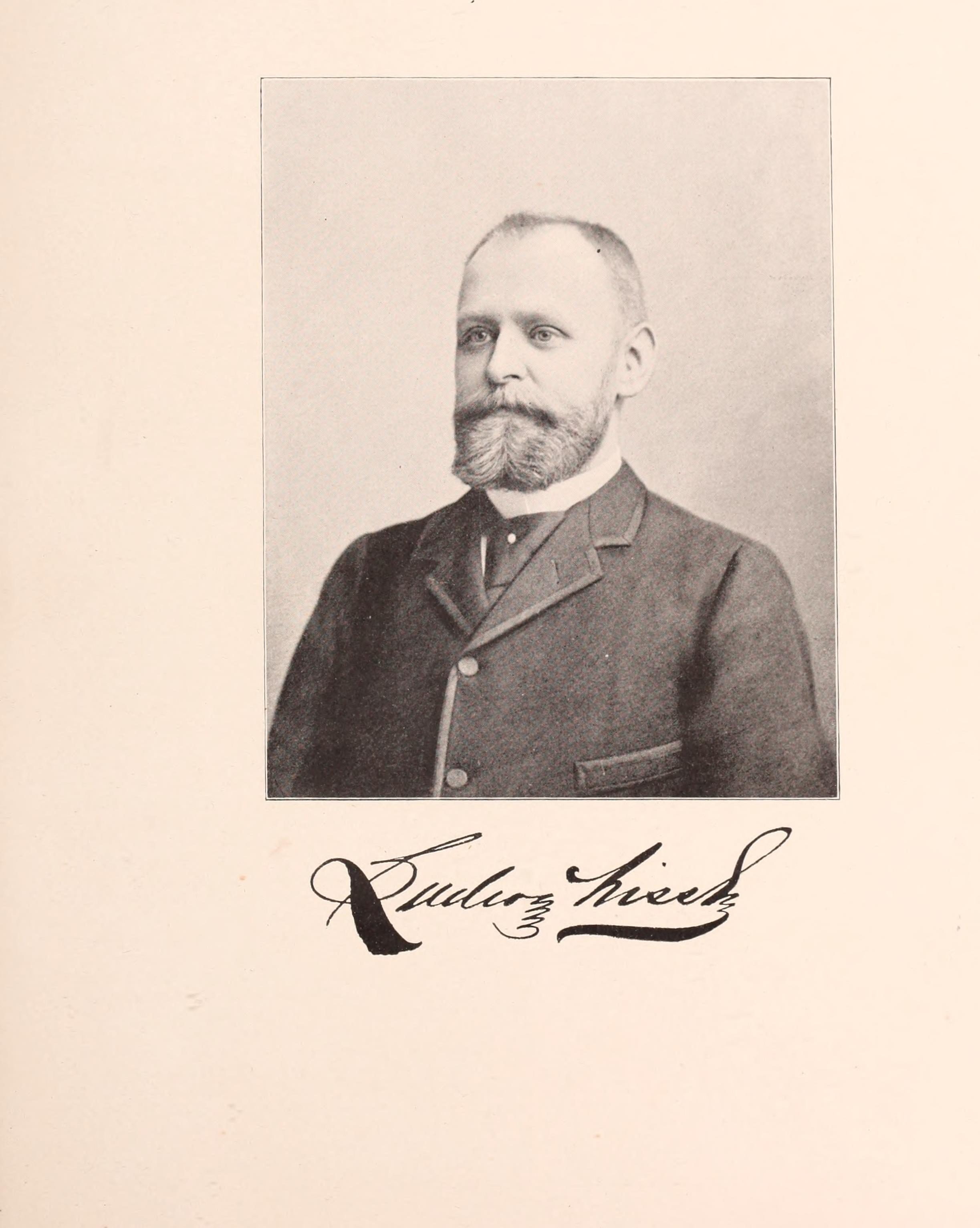
- Born: December 2, 1855; Husum, Duchy of Schleswig, Denmark (now Germany)
- Died: October 26, 1924 (aged 68); Brooklyn, New York, United States
- Citizenship: American
- Occupations: Jeweler, financier
- Spouse: Katharine Quick

Ludwig Nissen (December 2, 1855 – October 26, 1924) was a New York gemstone dealer and philanthropist. He lived in Brooklyn for many years and was well known in the Brooklyn community, particularly for the lavish mansion he built on St. Mark's Avenue. He is also known for founding the Nordsee Museum in Husum, Germany.

== Early life and career ==
=== Childhood in Husum (1855–1872) ===
Nissen was born on December 2, 1855, in Husum, then Denmark, the sixth of ten children born to ropemaker Hans Friedrich Nissen (1821–1887) and his wife Lucie Catherine Dawartz (1822–1898). After grade school, Nissen worked as a clerk at the local court at Husum Castle during the same period when famed Husum poet Theodor Storm worked there as a judge. However, there is no proof that the two men knew each other. As a clerk at the court, Nissen was able to issue his own passport prior to his 1872 departure for the United States. The signature on the passport betrays the youthful sense of humor of its issuer—he signed it "Claus Dursdenfeld von Immerdurstig" (which translates to Claus Thirsty-field from Always-thirsty).

=== Emigration and early years in New York ===
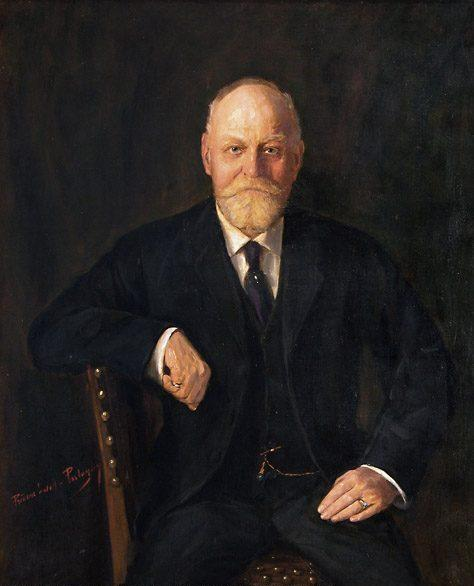
Portrait of Ludwig Nissen by Vilma Lwoff-Parlaghy

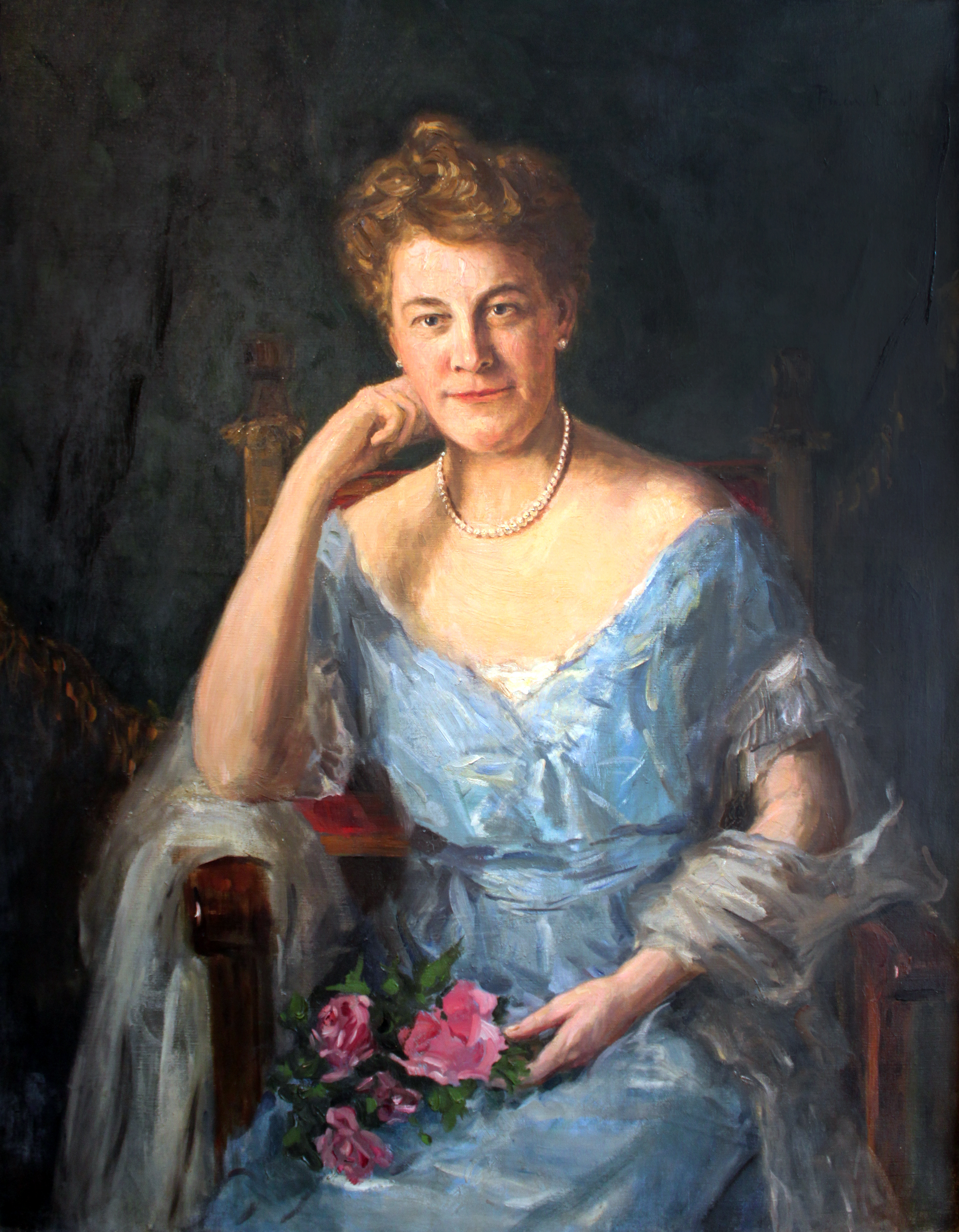
His wife, Katherine Quick-Nissen, 1922

On August 28, 1872, 16-year-old Ludwig left his hometown with his parents' permission and traveled on the steamer Westphalia from Hamburg to New York. On September 11, 1872, Nissen arrived at his new home. Portraits from the period show a confident young man who, despite his small-town background, was able to make his way in New York. Certainly his older brother Fritz was helpful to him at first. Fritz had already arrived in New York on the Harmonia in August 1869. Altogether, four of the ten Nissen children emigrated. Three died at a young age, and only three remained at home in Husum.

Nissen first settled in the neighborhood known as "Little Germany" in Manhattan. His first job was at a German barber's as a bootblack. He then worked at a hotel, as a shoe shiner, waiter, cashier, and accountant, before eventually opening a German restaurant with a man from Hamburg. Nissen got his American citizenship in 1879, and sold the restaurant to become a merchant.

=== Jewelry business and civic life ===
In May 1881, Nissen opened the jewelry shop Schilling and Nissen with the Hamburg diamond setter Fred Schilling. The company was burdened with debts, but had a quick upswing. In 1885 he founded his own firm, Ludwig Nissen & Co. He moved his business to the most prestigious street in New York, Fifth Avenue. He became involved in the New York jeweler's trade union, and became its treasurer in 1891. In 1895 he rose to the rank of vice president and, eventually, president. Other honorary offices brought him further respect: in 1897, he became commissioner for the City of Brooklyn for the Atlanta Exhibition, in 1901 for the Pan-American Exposition in Buffalo, in 1898 he was elected president of the Manufacturers' Association of New York and in 1900 he was appointed treasurer of the New York State Commission for the World's Fair in Paris.

Nissen founded the Jewelers Protective Association (JPA) to fight unfair competition, and also to counter smuggling, which often occurred when rich Americans traveled to Europe and tried to bring the jewels they had purchased there home without declaring them to customs. The JPA hired special agents to track these would-be smugglers and report them to Customs. This was one of the ways that Nissen demonstrated a firm belief in justice and patriotism.

For more than thirty years, Nissen demonstrated an active interest in public and economic affairs. The American Presidents Theodore Roosevelt, William Howard Taft and Calvin Coolidge sought his advice. Nissen became friendly with Roosevelt while he was police commissioner of New York, and the two men stayed in touch until Roosevelt's death in 1919. Nissen became an American through and through, and served his new home country well. Nonetheless, he stood up for Germany, for example, against the accusations that the imperial regime in Germany was to blame for the outbreak of World War I. In 1920, a testimonial dinner was held in his honor at the Hotel Astor in Manhattan. This dinner was "in recognition of the exceptional and eventful services rendered by him in various national and local fields of business, social, philanthropic, public and patriotic endeavor". Some of the speakers at the dinner were Georgia senator Hoke Smith and newspaper publisher Bernard Ridder. Nissen's memberships in various societies and clubs, as well as his honors and appointments, are reflected in a large collection of pins, badges, and ceremonial ribbons held at the Nordsee Museum.

== Personal life ==
=== Marriage and the Nissen mansion ===
On December 27, 1882, Nissen married the native-born New Yorker Katharine Quick (1862–1930). Her mother was from Switzerland and her father was from Darmstadt. He had Anglicized his family name Schnell to Quick upon his emigration to the United States. The Nissens remained childless for the duration of their marriage. As befitted a couple of their wealth and stature, the Nissens traveled frequently. In 1865 they traveled to California and drove through a large redwood tree. The museum in Husum holds both a photograph of that experience and the redwood walking stick that Nissen brought home as a souvenir.

By 1902, the couple were living in a limestone townhouse at 1397 Dean Street in Brooklyn. Prior to that, they had lived in a brownstone at 43 Monroe Street. In 1906, Nissen acquired a plot of land near his Dean Street home at 810 St. Mark's Avenue. Though the plot already had a large home on it, Nissen had a new mansion built there by the Norwegian immigrant architect Arne Dehli, which was completed in 1908. The mansion cost $250,000. The completed mansion was lavishly furnished and decorated with many expensive artworks, most of which are now in the museum in Husum that Nissen's estate funded. The stately three-story building contained both stables for horses (Nissen was an avid horseman) and car garages, as well as a bowling alley in the basement. Brooklyn Life magazine described the mansion as "one of the most beautiful homes on this famous street of show houses".

=== Death and the Nordsee Museum in Husum ===
In 1915 Nissen, in his first will and testament, expressed a desire to create a cultural heritage for his hometown. In the same text, he expressed his self-understanding as a European immigrant: "My household is a historical document of my life and that of my contemporaries." He wanted to dedicate the future cultural site he would create to the memory of his parents. About 50 years after his emigration, in 1920, Nissen went back to Husum for the first time. It was on that occasion that he involved the district councilor of Husum, Heinrich Clasen, in his plans.

The planned house was intended to have the character of a "people's house", museum, and art gallery. For this purpose, rooms were to be established so that the public could meet for charitable, scientific, literary or educational purposes. In 1921, Nissen announced his plans publicly in Husum. The plans were recorded in his will of June 12, 1922, and became final via deed of donation from February 29, 1928, onward. For his legacy, Nissen chose to establish an independent foundation, which was intended to guarantee independence even in the face of changing political and economic trends.

On October 26, 1924, Ludwig Nissen died at his home in Brooklyn. He established the town of Husum as heir to his fortune of 2.5 million Deutsche Marks, and dictated in his will that his legacy was intended primarily for the construction of the museum and related cultural purposes. Even before his death, Nissen had donated a large number of valuable museum pieces for this "people's house", which had previously been housed in the offices of Husum Castle.

On December 29, 1930, Nissen's widow Kathie succumbed to a stroke. From her estate, she gave the town of Husum $170,000, so the total inheritance for the city from the Nissens was 3 million Deutsche Marks. Thus, Ludwig Nissen's testamentary plans in Husum could be realized.

Nissen's art collection consisted of artists from several European countries as well as from America, and also contained paintings and embroideries by his wife. The artworks are generally of classic motifs: still lifes, animal portraits, and so forth. In 1923, he acquired part of the estate of Elisabeth Vilma Lwoff-Parlaghy at auction, already thinking about his future museum.

==== Artists in Ludwig Nissen's collection ====
- Andreas Achenbach
- Albert Bierstadt
- George Henry Bogert
- Rosa Bonheur
- Frederick James Boston
- Joseph H. Boston
- Armin Buchterkirch
- Pietro Calvi
- Cyrus Edwin Dallin
- Frank Russell Green
- Carl Ferdinand Hamann
- Albert Janesch
- Carl Ludwig Jessen
- Albert Johannsen Jr.
- Vilma Lwoff-Parlaghy
- Julius Olsson
- Frederic Sackrider Remington
- Detlef Sammann
- Christian Sell
- Max Silbert
- Gabriel Eduard Thurner
- Beatrix Charlotte Vernon
