= Albert Janesch =

Austrian painter (1889–1973)

- Born: 12 June 1889; Vienna, Austria-Hungary
- Died: 10 May 1973 (aged 83); Vienna, Austria
- Occupation: Painter

Albert Janesch (12 June 1889 – 10 May 1973) was an Austrian painter. His work was part of the painting event in the art competition at the 1936 Summer Olympics.

== Honours and awards ==
=== Foreign honours ===
- Czechoslovakia: Officer of the Order of the White Lion (1934)
