= Gisela Weimann =

German multimedia artist (born 1943)

- Born: June 10, 1943 (age 82); Bad Blankenburg, Germany
- Occupation: Multimedia artist

Gisela Weimann (born June 10, 1943) is a German multimedia artist who lives and works in Berlin. Her working techniques range from painting, printmaking, photography, sculpture and film to performance art and art in public spaces. She has also written and published several books and essays about her own work, art collaborations and art history topics. Her work often focuses on political — particularly feminist — themes and on the relationship of art with political and social issues.

== Early life and education ==
Weimann was born in 1943 in Bad Blankenburg, East Germany in the middle of the Second World War. In 1946-47, the family fled to the region of Osnabrück, West Germany. She grew up during a period of German history she describes as "characterized by destruction, displacement and loss of identity."

In 1965 after a basic education at the art schools in Münster and Bremen, and a vocational training as a foreign language correspondent, Weimann studied painting by Alexander Camaro at the Berlin University of the Arts, where she graduated in 1971 as a master class student. With the help of a DAAD scholarship, she continued her studies in free graphics and experimental photography at the Royal College of Art in London (Short Course Certificate).

From 1972 to 1976 she was a lecturer in free graphics at the former Medway College of Design Rochester, Kent, and Gloucestershire College of Art and Design, Cheltenham. In 1978-79 she won another scholarship (Airlift and Fulbright Program) to study film and photography at the San Francisco Art Institute, San Francisco / United States (Bachelor of Arts). Weimann stayed in the Americas and lived and worked in Tepoztlán, Mexico for two years.

== Career ==
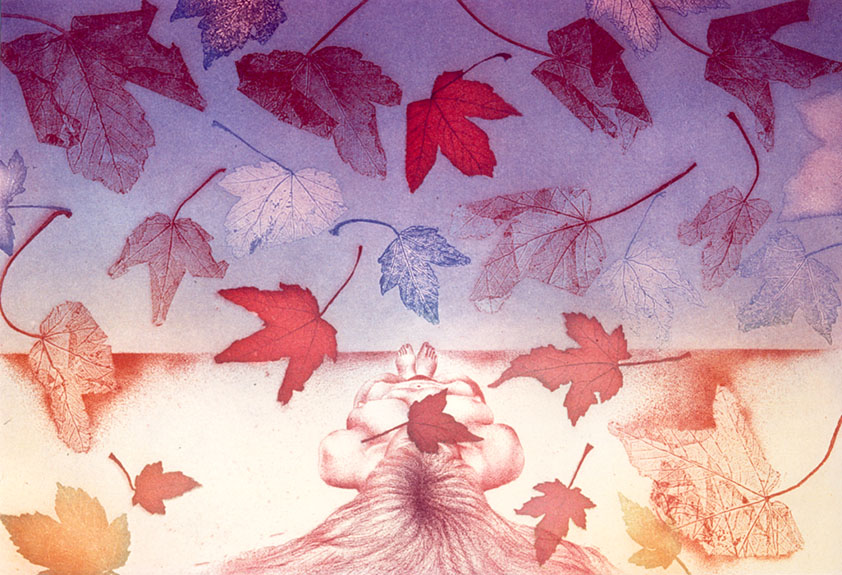
Gisela Weimann, "Fall", London 1972.

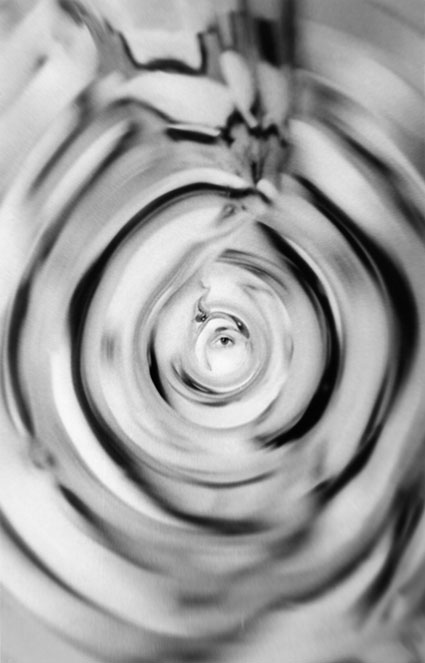
Gisela Weimann, "Porträt", London 1971.

From 1990 until 1993 she directed the communal Galerie Lebendiges Museum (Living Museum Gallery) in Berlin-Wedding in cooperation with the Schering Art Society. In 1991 she was awarded a residence scholarship in Istanbul (Turkey) by the Cultural Senate of Berlin. The following year, she received a production grant from the Berlin Women Artists Programme and in 1994 a publishing grant from the Käthe Dorsch Foundation, Berlin. Between 1996 and 2004, Weimann was a DAAD Guest Lecturer in the Fine Arts Departments of the Universities of Salamanca and Madrid (Spain), Cluj-Napoca (Romania) and the Universidad Autónoma Metropolitana in Mexico City. In 1997 she received a grant from the Villa Aurora in Los Angeles and in 2000 project grants for the “Opera for 4 Buses” by Kulturfonds and Berlin Capital Culture Fund. In 2002 she was awarded the prestigious Critics Prize for Visual Arts, and in 2011, 2012 and 2013 she received production grants from the Centre d’Art Contemporain d'Essaouira in Ifitry (Morocco). Other recent resident scholarships were from the Kunstverein Frankfurt-Oder (Germany) in 2009 and the Emily Harvey Foundation in Venice (Italy) in 2009 and 2014. Since then, she has been living and working in Berlin.

Weimann's work has been exhibited internationally; her exhibitions include sound installations and multimedia performances. These include: "Une mer, deux rivages" MAC.A, Asilah (Morocco) (2014–15); "My shadow Stays", solo exhibition, Brno House of Arts (Czech Republic) (2014); "Start Date End Here Now", solo exhibition, Kunsthalle Brennabor, Brandenburg an der Havel (2013); "World in Flames", Casablanca Biennale (Morocco) (2012); "Memorias", Palacio de la Mosquera, Arenas de San Pedro (Spain) (2011); "La Notte Blu", Teatro Fondamenta Nuove, Venice (Italy) and galerie futura, Berlin (2010); "Winds Ballet I / Aurora", Body Navigation Festival, St. Petersburg (Russia) and "Espacios Mediterraneos" Casa de las Conchas, Salamanca (Spain) (2008); "Transatlantic Impulses", Martin-Gropius-Bau Museum, Berlin (2005); and "Opera for 4 Buses" Museumsinselfestival Berlin (2001).

== Select publications ==
- Werkwechsel I, GEDOK, 1989, ISBN 3-927551-10-4
- Von Asien nach Europa, 1995
- Reflexionen / Reflections dt./engl., VDG Weimar, 2002, ISBN 3-897393-02-6
- Cow School: Guidelines for Classes in: n.paradoxa international feminist art journal, volume 15, jan 2005, pp. 13–17
- Geteilte Zeit: Fragen und Antworten, VDG Weimar, 2007, ISBN 3-897395-66-5
- La Notte Blu in: n.paradoxa international feminist art journal, volume 24, jul 2009, pp. 45–48

== Critical reception ==
When Weimann was awarded the Critics Prize for Visual Art, the awardee Dr. Stefanie Endlich said of the artist: "There are two leading threads in Gisela Weimann’s life’s work: her diaries, which are conceived visually as well as narratively and which describe her continuous reflections on the relation between politics, society and personal experience. Both threads determine the specific form of her artistic references. Both include her repeated mental struggle with the powerlessness of art against war and violence. In awarding this prize, the jury wishes to emphasize that Gisela Weimann’s struggle is not outdated but as important as ever in today’s world."
