= Uthörn =

Island in Wadden Sea, Germany

Uthörn Udhjørne Holm
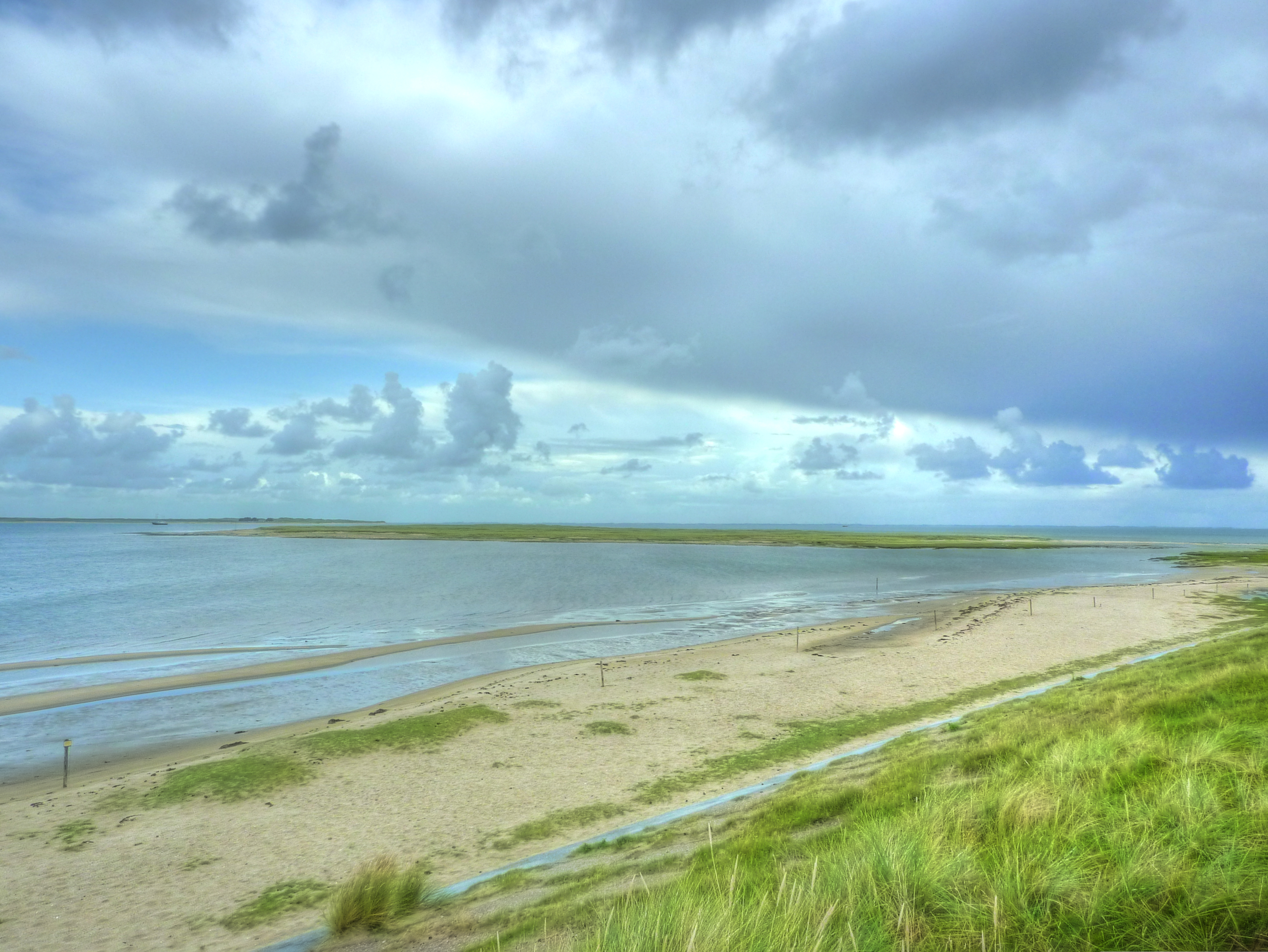
- Uthörn seen from the southern shore of Königshafen
- Interactive map of Uthörn; Udhjørne Holm

Geography
- Location: Königshafen, Wadden Sea, German Bight, North Sea
- Coordinates: 55°2′10″N 8°25′50″E
- Archipelago: North Frisian Islands
- Area: 0.13 km^{2} (0.050 sq mi)
- Length: 780 m (2560 ft)
- Width: 240 m (790 ft)
- Coastline: 1,800 m (5900 ft)
- Highest elevation: 4.1 m (13.5 ft)
- Highest point: Dune

Administration
- Germany
- State: Schleswig-Holstein
- District: Nordfriesland
- Municipality: List

Demographics
- Population: 0

Additional information
- protected

Uthörn (German pronunciation: [ˈuːtˌhœʁn]; Danish: Udhjørne Holm) is a small German island adjacent to the Sylt island in the district of Nordfriesland, and as such it is Germany's northernmost isle right after Sylt proper. It belongs to the List municipality.

== Geography ==
The island is situated in the so-called Königshafen (King's Harbour), a bay on the eastern shore of Sylt which is facing the shallow tidal flats of the Wadden Sea in that area. Uthörn is located north of the town of List, only a kilometre away from the Ellbogen (Elbow) peninsula of Sylt, which is Germany's northernmost area.

Uthörn is almost 800 meters long and up to 240 meters wide, its area amounts to about 13 ha. The island is relatively young, as it developed out of a sand bar, which due to wind drift of sand from Sylt has now grown to a height of approximately 4.10 m above sea level and is no longer submerged during high tide. It is thought that the growth of Uthörn is likely to continue in the future.

The island is overgrown by pioneer species of plants and the common dune vegetation like marram grass.

== Protection ==
Uthörn is located just a few metres off the shore of Sylt and can be reached on foot through the shallow sea. But as it provides space for the hatching and resting of rare and endangered seabirds and is situated inside the Schleswig-Holstein Wadden Sea National Park, it may only be entered with special permission.
