= Denghoog =

Ancient monument

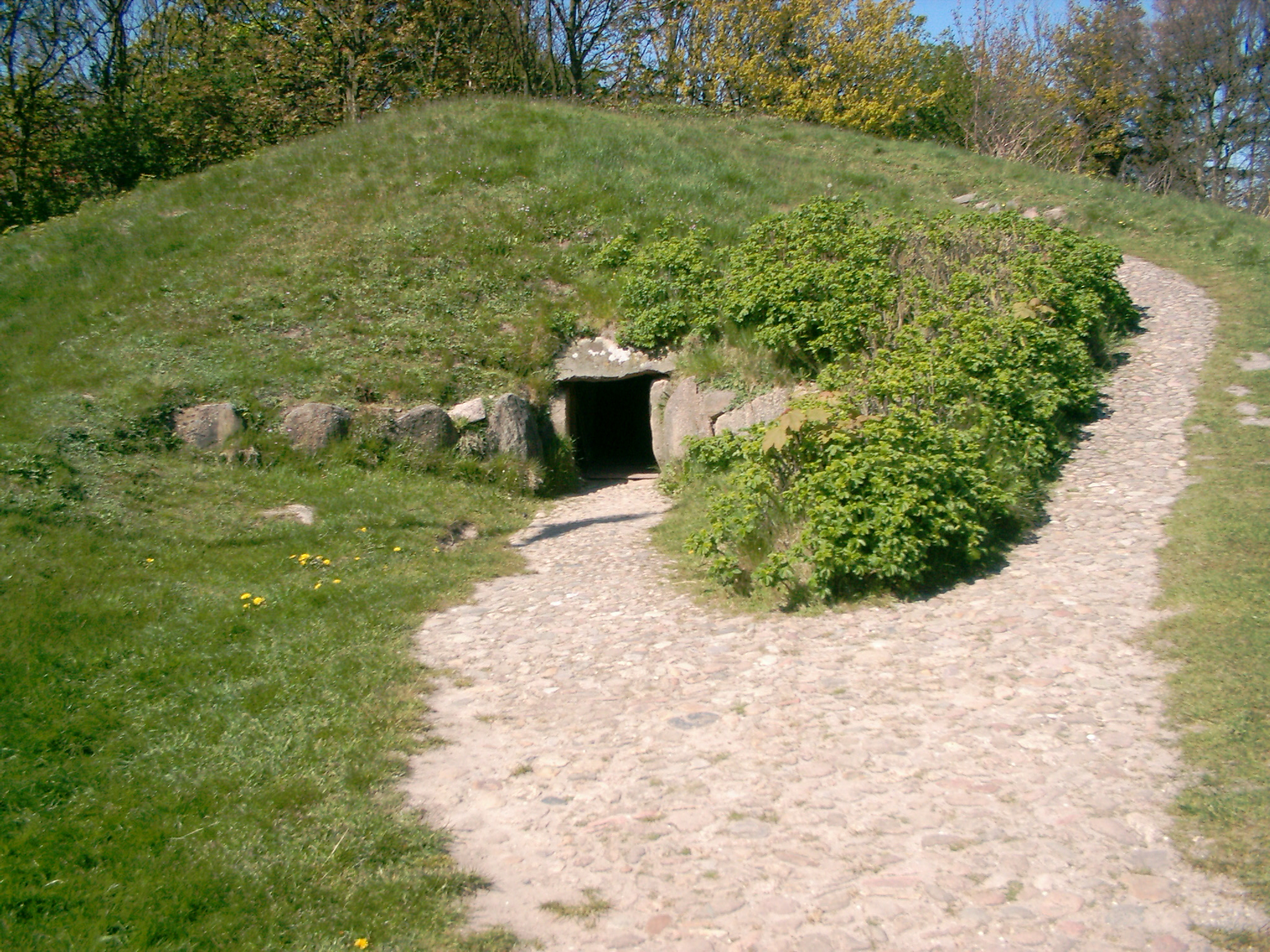
- View of the tomb with entry to chamber

- Location in Schleswig-Holstein, Germany
- 54.940417°N 8.329167°E
- Type: Neolithic passage grave
- Periods: Neolithic
- Location: Wenningstedt-Braderup, Schleswig-Holstein, Germany

History
- Built: c. 3200 BC
- Abandoned: c. 2800 BC

Site notes
- Material: Dirt
- Height: c. 3.5 meters
- Diameter: c. 32 meters
- Archaeologists: Ferdinand Wibel (1868), J. Reichstein (1982, Archäologisches Landesamt Schleswig-Holstein)
- Owner: Sölring Foriining
- Public access: Yes

Denghoog is a Neolithic passage grave dating from around 3000 BC on the northern edge of Wenningstedt-Braderup on the German island of Sylt. The name Denghoog derives from the Söl'ring Deng (Thing) and Hoog (Hill).

== Design and construction ==
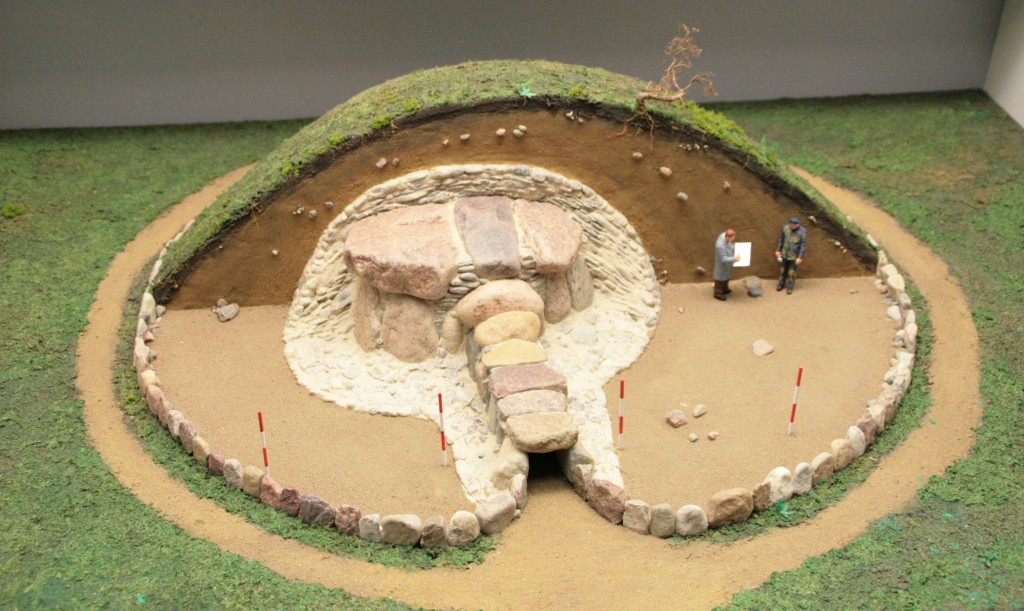
Model of the excavated Denghoog passage grave

Denghoog is an artificial hill created in the 4th millennium BC on top of a passage grave. The hill today has a height of around 3.5 metres and a diameter at the base of around 32 metres. The internal chamber is ellipsoid, measuring about 5 metres by 3 metres. Its roof is supported by twelve large boulders. The space between them is covered by dry stone walls made up of so-called Zwickelsteine. Three huge boulders, weighing around 20 metric tons each, form the roof of about 75 cm thickness. These stones are glacial erratics, carried here in the ice age from Scandinavia. The spaces between the roof stones are also filled with dry stone walling. A layer of firm blue clay, brought here from the eastern side of the island, mixed with stone fragments almost completely waterproofs the roof. Above this is a layer of yellow sand, covered by a final layer of humus.

A passage of six metres length and a height of one metre leads into the chamber. Several other stone blocks were found scattered around the base of the hill. These have been interpreted as the remains of a stone circle on top of the hill.

== Excavation history ==
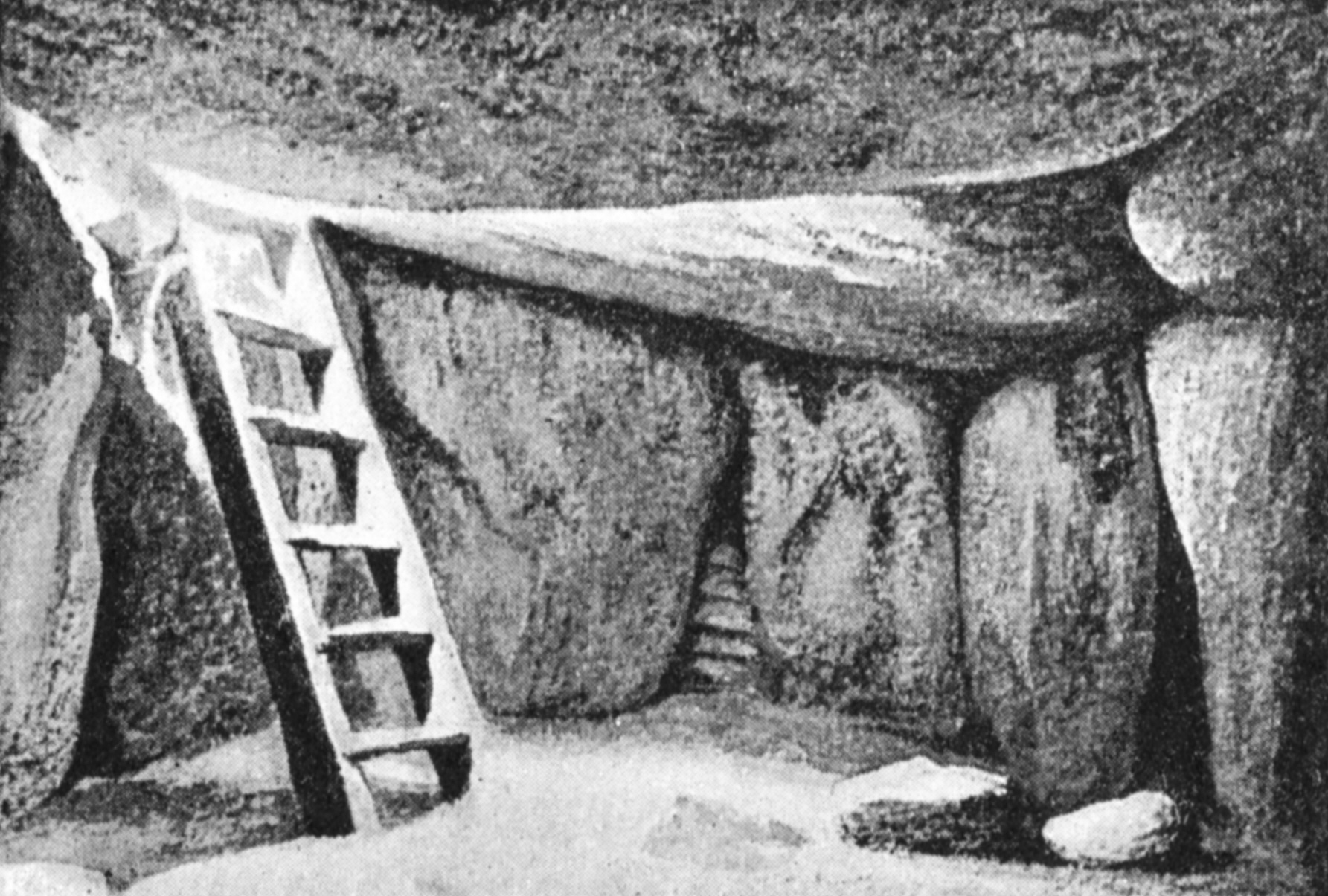
Interior of the Denghoog

The hill was first opened for archaeological research in 1868 by Ferdinand Wibel, a professor of geology. He found an undisturbed grave chamber that was divided in three sections. The eastern section was divided off by two rows of upright tiles, rising around 25 cm above the floor. The floor of the section was meticulously tiled with stone covered by a layer of small stone fragments. The western and north-western sections featured a substantial number of slab-like stones, some of which were arranged in a semi-circle. The floor of the chamber was covered by a roughly 20 cm deep layer of gray (on top) and yellow (below) sand in which were found some burial objects, remains of an unburned body and a cow's tooth. Remains of other burials were found strewn all over the chamber.

Wibel found a complete pottery jar and shards of 24 other vessels, 11 of which could be reassembled or completed. The largest of these, a Schultergefäss has a height of 38 cm and a diameter of 31 cm. Other burial objects included stone tools (hatchets, chisels, 20 flint blades, a pyrite bulb for making fire and two circular holed discs with a diameter of 10 to 12 cm (Scheibenkeulen). There were also six amber beads (one of them labrys-shaped) and fragments of a seventh bead. All of these findings are today exhibited at the Archäologisches Landesmuseum in Schloss Gottorf, in Schleswig. Copies of the major pieces are in the Sylter Heimatmuseum at Keitum.

Although Wibel exactly documented the location of the findings, there is no clear information on the layering of the individual items. It can thus only be assumed that a number of people were buried in the tomb over a longer period of time.

In the past a specific period of the Neolithicum was referred to in Germany as the Denhoog Stufe, named after this monument.

In 1982, a new excavation was conducted by Prof. J. Reichstein of the Archäologisches Landesamt Schleswig-Holstein. This involved examining the surroundings, remeasuring the site, creating a contour level map as well as to-scale floorplans of chamber and passage. It was discovered that the chamber had been surrounded by tiles made from gneiss or quartz, assembled like a shingle roof. Two worked stones were found that had served as door wings for the passage, a rarity for this type of tomb. It was also noted that no trace could be found of screed made from burned flint stone, usually a standard feature of megalithic tomb chambers. Outside the tomb, excavations revealed a set of stones that were arrayed in a funnel-shape oriented towards the passage entry. Next to it were slightly dug-in deposits of clay shards, covered by fist- to head-sized boulders. The richly ornamented pottery resembled those discovered earlier by Wibel. After the excavation was finished, the passage was restored and some of the stones forming the funnel reerected in their original position.

By its shape and ornamentation, the pottery found inside the tomb indicates a date between 3200 and 3000 BC. It is likely that the Denghoog served as a burial site for a family or clan over a period spanning several generations.

Archaeologist Maria Wunderlich identified four individual periods of use of the site: In the initial phase (circa 3200 to 3100 BC) a first burial took place inside the chamber, with two axes, amber and pottery. Small pits were dug next to the passage and small offerings deposited therein. The majority of burials likely took place in the second phase (3100 to 3000 BC), as indicated by numerous findings of funnelbeaker pottery and amber beads. Smashed pottery was deposited outside the structure. The third phase (3000 to 2950 BC) saw the most intensive use of the external area, with various pieces of pottery placed outside (at least six) and two within the chamber. During the fourth and final phase (2950 to 2800 BC) burials likely continued in the chamber but by that time the pits had been filled up. No further deposits took place in the entry area. Deposits of pottery and probable associated rites thus took place outside the structure over a period of around ten generations. The number of deposited vessels (at least 86) indicates more than eight deposits per generation. Inside the chamber another 23 vessels indicate a further two or three per generation. This indicates an average of one burial per decade. The larger number of deposits in the exterior area (three times the number inside the chamber) points to an institutionalized form of ancestor worship.

== Today ==
The property was purchased in 1928 by Sölring Foriining and has been accessible to the public since that date.

== Historic descriptions ==
Mr. W.G. Black described it as follows:—

"There is some confusion as to King Finn's dwelling. As doctors differ, we may be allowed to claim that it was the Denghoog, close to Wenningstedt, if only because we descended into that remarkable dwelling. Externally merely a swelling green mound, like so many others in Sylt, entrance is gained by a trap-door in the roof, and descending a steep ladder, one finds himself in a subterranean chamber, some seventeen by ten feet in size [5.2 m × 3.0 m], the walls of which are twelve huge blocks of Swedish granite;[Pg 72] the height of the roof varies from five feet to six feet [1.5–1.8 m]. The original entrance appears to have been a long narrow passage, seventeen feet [5.2 m] long and about two feet wide and high. This mound was examined by a Hamburg professor in 1868, who found remains of a fireplace, bones of a small man, some clay urns, and stone weapons. Later, a Kiel professor is said to have carried off all he found therein to Kiel Museum, and so far we have not been able to trace the published accounts of his investigations.

Mr. Christian Jensen, of Oevenum, Föhr, gave this account of Denghoog:

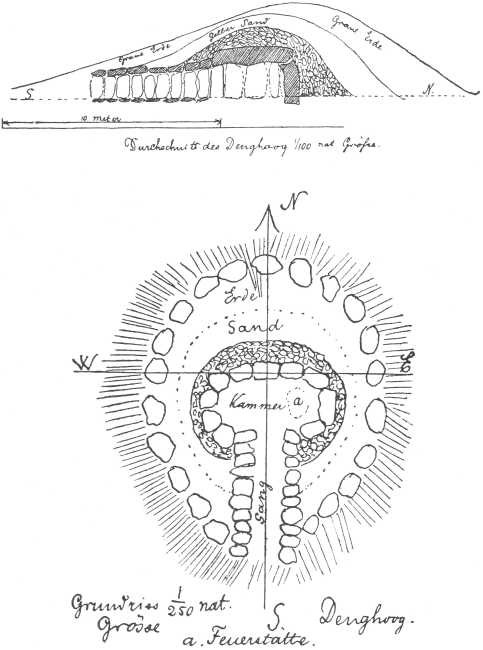
Professor Wibel's sketch

:"The sketches of the Denhoog which I enclose [viz., the Ground Plan and Sectional View] are from the drawings of Professor Wibel, who conducted the excavation of it in 1868. From his and C.P. Hansen's observations I contribute the following statements: Originally, the mound was higher, but in 1868 it had the form of a truncated cone, 4½ mètres [say 14 feet 9 inches (4.50 m)] in height. As may be seen from the picture, it slopes away to the south above the original passage into the mound, which the dweller made use of as his entrance; so that the extent is very considerable. The present entrance, as may be seen from the view of the interior, was made from above, at the north side, directly opposite the original entrance.... Dr. Wibel says: 'At the south side of the chamber is the doorway for ingress and egress, with the passage itself leading from it. This passage, which was 6 metres [19 feet 8 inches] in length, was lined with upright blocks of granite and gneiss, with a roofing and floor made of flagstones of the same kinds of stone. It was opened up all the way to the mouth of the passage. This [the outer orifice] lay close to the extremity of the earth and near the floor of the mound, was closed with earth only, not with a stone, and measured about 1 metre [3 feet 3.4 inches] in height, and 1 1/3 metres (4.4 ft) in breadth. On account of these dimensions ... one[Pg 73] can only creep through with difficulty, and for that reason the plan does not show with accuracy the position of the wall-slabs, and their number is merely conjectured to be nine."

Immediately after the excavation of 17–19 September 1868, C.P. Hansen wrote as follows:—

"'There are in the island of Sylt hillocks of ancient origin, for the most part pagan burying-places, but some of which may have served as the dwelling-places of a primitive people. One such hillock has just been opened at Wenningstedt. The interior was found to be a chamber, seventeen feet [5.2 m] long, ten feet [3.0 m] in breadth, and from 5 to 6 feet [1.5 to 1.8 m] in height, with a covered passage about twenty-two feet [6.7 m] long, trending southward. The walls of this underground room were composed of twelve large granite blocks, regularly arranged; the roof consisted of three still larger slabs of the same kind of rock; the stones which formed the passage were smaller. At one corner of the floor of the cellar there was a well-defined fireplace, and near it were urns and flint implements; in the opposite corner there were many bones lying, apparently unburned, probably those of the last dweller in the cavern.'"

"... On the floor of the chamber, three separate divisions were distinctly visible, of which one, situated on the east side, showed traces of having been a fireplace. Professor Wibel found several fragments of human bones, which evidently belonged only to one individual, as no portion was duplicated; also a few animals' bones. There was an extraordinary number of fragments of pottery, belonging to about 24 different urns, of which 11 could be put together. Their form and ornamentation were both fine and varied, an interesting witness to the ceramics of the grey past.... Among the stone implements found were a great many flint-knives; two stone hatchets, two chisels, and a gouge, all of[Pg 74] flint, and a disc of porphyry were also obtained. Several mineral substances, quartzite, rubble-stones, gravel, ochre, a sinter-heap — these are less interesting than the seven amber beads which, with some charcoal, completes the list of objects found. Referring to former investigations of galleried mounds [gangbauten], which seem to have been used in some cases as burying-places, in others as dwellings, Dr. Wibel observes, in answer to the question resulting from his discovery, as to whether the Denghoog ought to be regarded as a sepulchre or as a dwelling, that, as Nilsson has already said, all gallery-mounds were originally dwellings, and occasionally became utilised as tombs. In the case of the Denghoog, this fact is demonstrated by the fireplace, the scattered potsherds, the amber beads, &c."
