= Leew Eilun Feer =

Anthem of Föhr

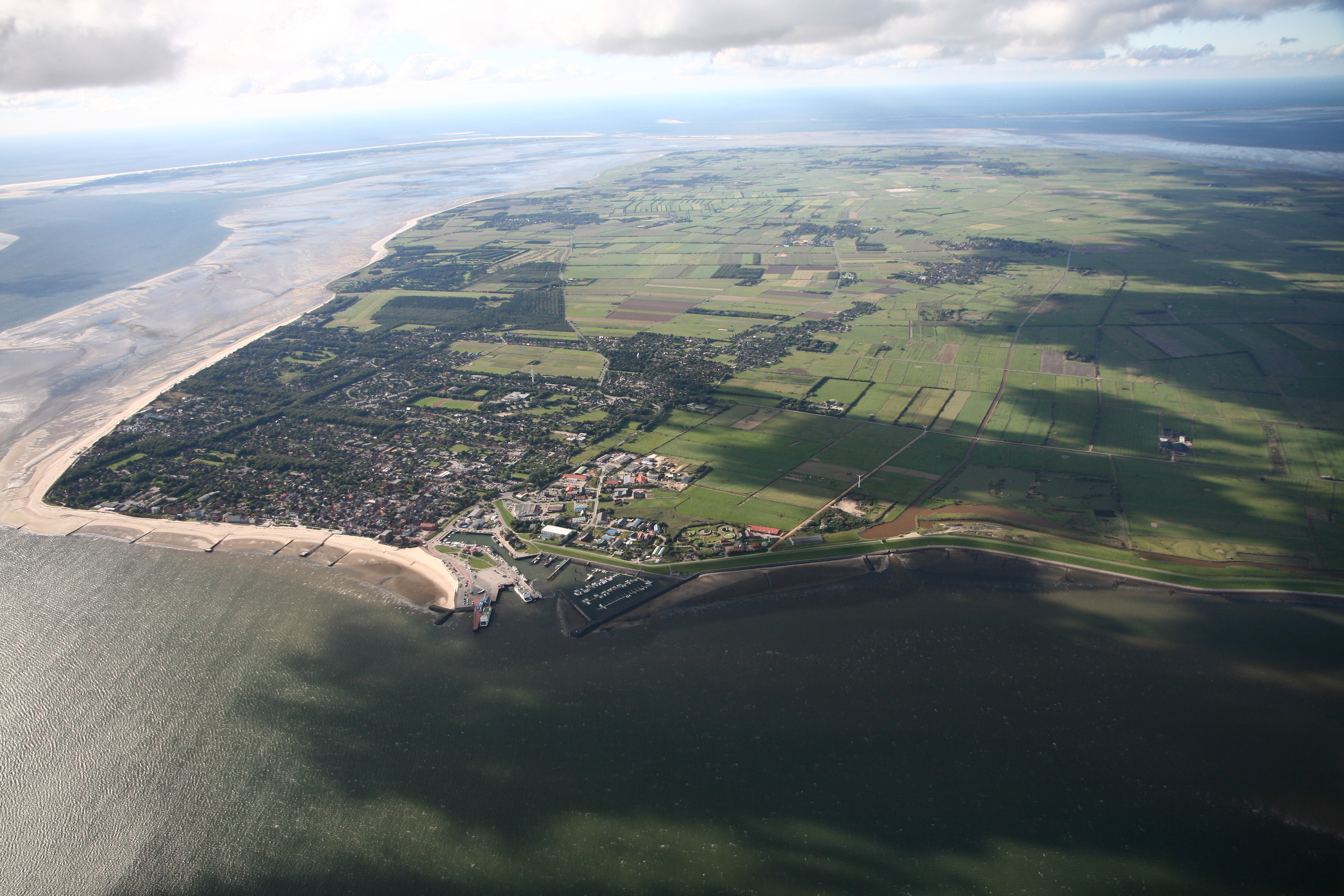
Aerial view of Föhr

Leew Eilun Feer (Föhr North Frisian for "Beloved Isle of Föhr") is the insular anthem of Föhr, in the Fering dialect. The lyrics were written by Knud Broder Knudsen (1864–1917).

== Lyrics ==
Alhuar ik henkem üüb a eerd,
alhü uk het det lun:
at jaft dach man an ian eilun Feer,
det leit mi boowen uun.
An kaam ’k uk hen uun ’t lokelkst steed,
huar surgen goor ej wiar,
toocht ik dach äeder an uk leed
am di, min eilun Feer.

Translation:

Wherever I go on this Earth,
whatever name a land may have
there's only one Isle of Föhr,
that in my mind is best.
If I came upon the happiest place,
where worries don't exist,
all the day from dawn till dusk I'd think
of you, my Isle of Föhr.

== See also ==
- Üüs Söl’ring Lön’
