= Sylt =

German island in the North Sea

Native name: Söl, Sild
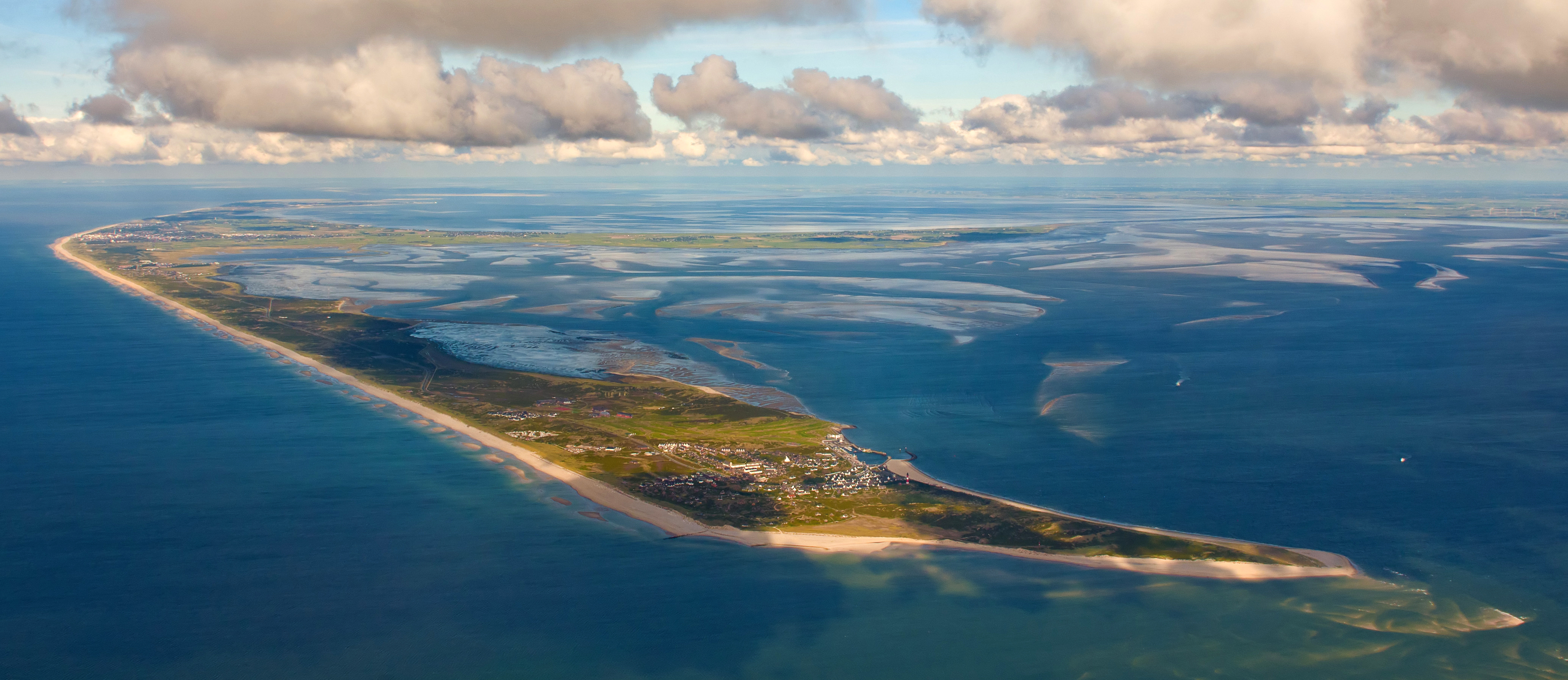
- September 2013 aerial photograph of Sylt

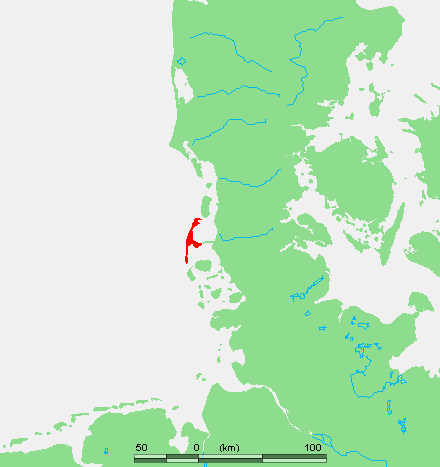

Geography
- Location: Wadden Sea
- Coordinates: 54°54′N 8°20′E
- Archipelago: North Frisian Islands
- Major islands: Sylt, Föhr, Amrum
- Area: 99 km^{2} (38 sq mi)
- Length: 38 km (23.6 mi)
- Width: 13 km (8.1 mi)
- Highest elevation: 52 m (171 ft)
- Highest point: Uwe-Düne

Administration
- Germany
- State: Schleswig-Holstein
- District: Nordfriesland

Demographics
- Demonym: Sylters
- Population: 21,000
- Pop. density: 212/km^{2} (549/sq mi)
- Ethnic groups: Germans, Frisians, Danes

Additional information
- Official website: www.gemeinde-sylt.de

Sylt (German pronunciation: [zʏlt]; Danish: Sild; Söl'ring North Frisian: Söl) is an island in northern Germany, part of Nordfriesland district, Schleswig-Holstein, with a distinctively shaped shoreline. It belongs to the North Frisian Islands and is the largest island in North Frisia. The northernmost island of Germany, it is known for its tourist resorts, notably Westerland, Kampen and Wenningstedt-Braderup, as well as for its 40-kilometre-long (25-mile) sandy beach. It is frequently covered by the media in connection with its exposed situation in the North Sea and its ongoing loss of land during storm tides. Since 1927, Sylt has been connected to the mainland by the Hindenburgdamm causeway. The causeway carries the Marsh Railway, on which passenger and car shuttle train services operate. In later years, it has been a resort for the German jet set and tourists in search of occasional celebrity sightings.

== Geography ==
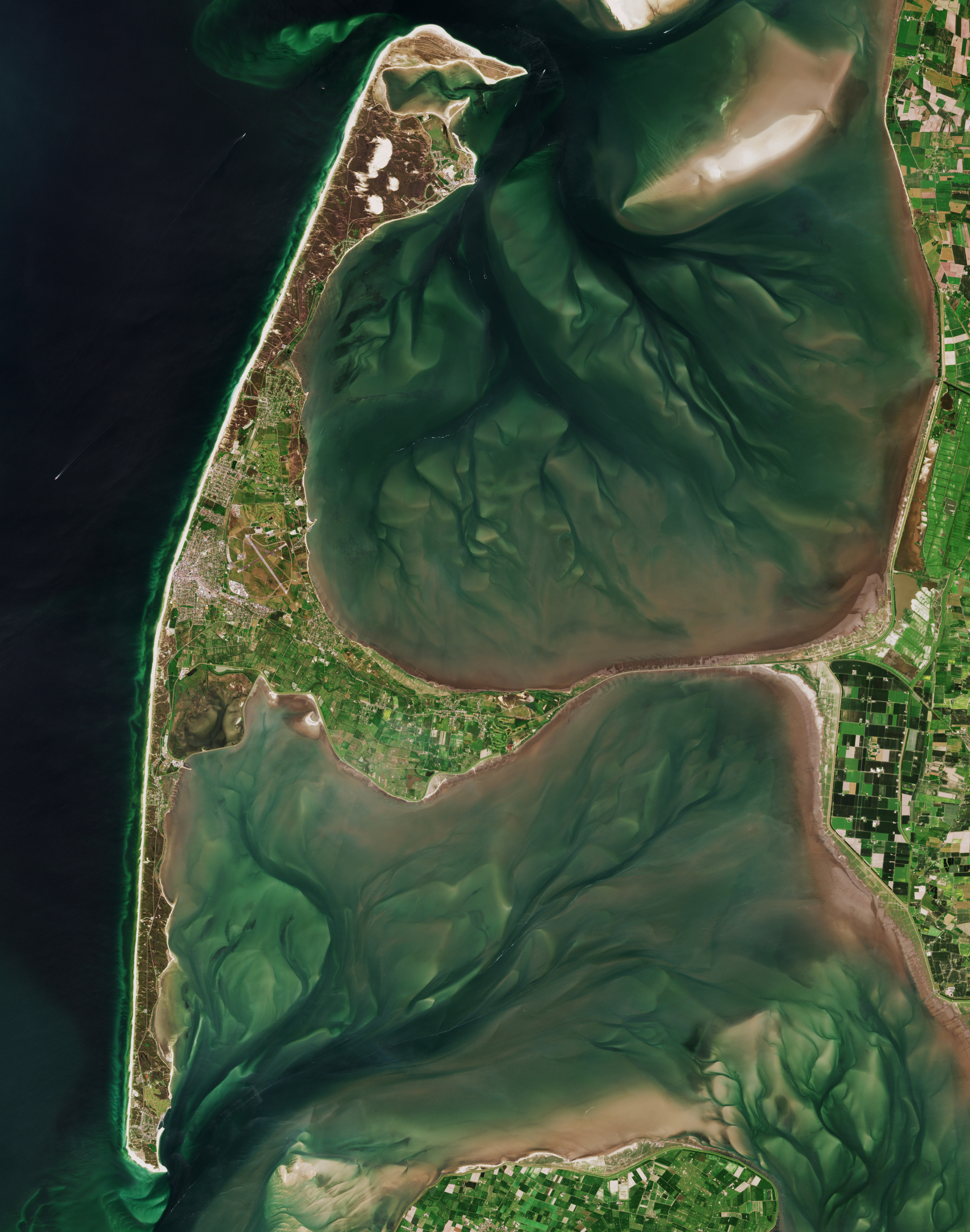
Satellite image of Sylt

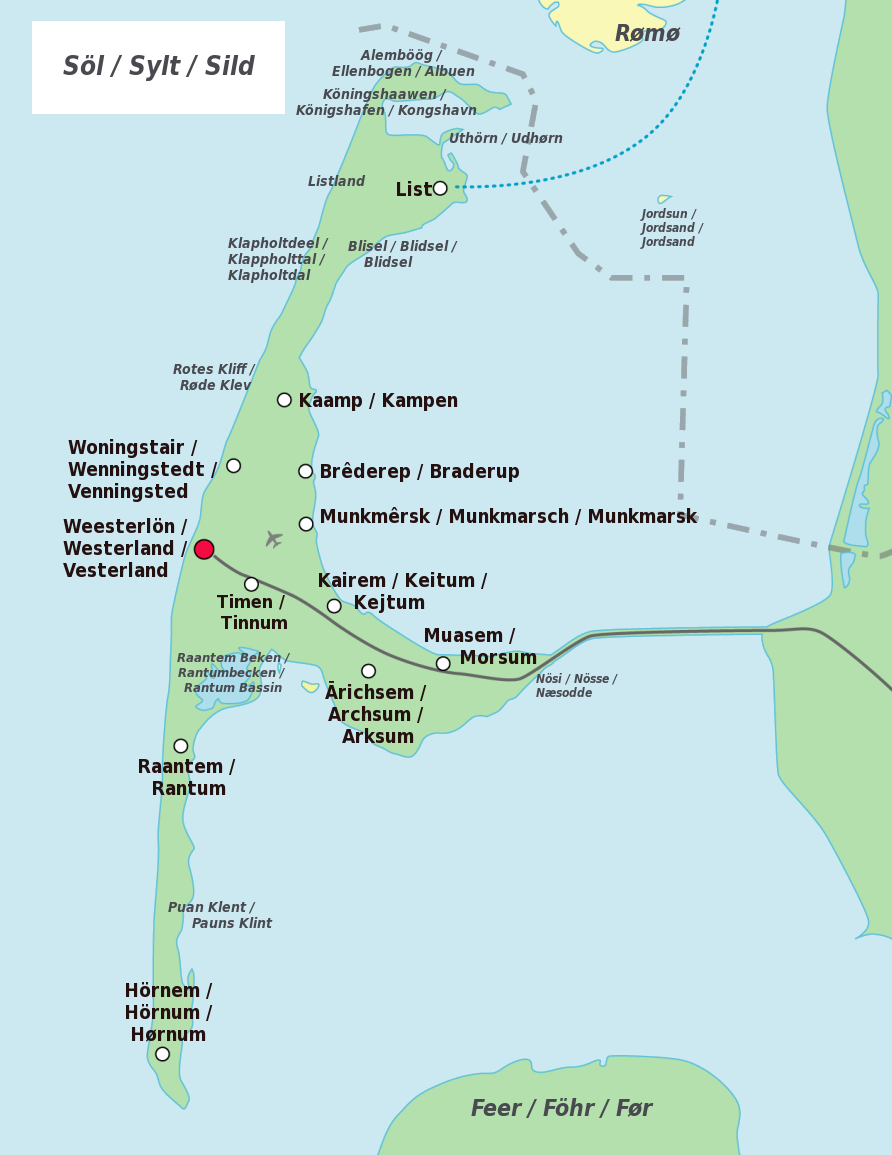
Map of Sylt (North Frisian, German and Danish place names)

With 99.14 square kilometres (38.28 square miles), Sylt is the fourth-largest German island and the largest German island in the North Sea. Sylt is located from 9 to 16 kilometres (6–10 miles) off the mainland, to which it is connected by the Hindenburgdamm. Southeast of Sylt are the islands of Föhr and Amrum, to the north lies the Danish island of Rømø. The island of Sylt extends for 38 kilometres (24 miles) in a north–south direction. At its northern point at Königshafen, it is only 320 metres (1,050 feet) wide. Its greatest width, from the town of Westerland in the west to the eastern Nössespitze near Morsum, measures 12.6 kilometres (7.8 miles). On the western and northwestern shore, there is a 40-kilometre-long (25-mile) sandy beach. To the east of Sylt, is the Wadden Sea, which belongs to the Schleswig-Holstein Wadden Sea National Park and mostly falls dry during low tide.

The island's shape has constantly shifted over time, a process which is still ongoing today. The northern and southern spits of Sylt are exclusively made up of infertile sand deposits, while the central part with the municipalities of Westerland, Wenningstedt-Braderup and Sylt-Ost consists of a geestland core, which becomes apparent in the form of the Red Cliff of Wenningstedt. The geestland facing the Wadden Sea gradually turns into fertile marshland around Sylt-Ost. Sylt has only been an island since the Grote Mandrenke flood of 1362. The so-called Uwe-Düne (Uwe Dune) is the island's highest elevation with 52.5 metres (172.2 feet) above sea level.

The island in its current form has only existed for about 400 years. Like the mainland geestland, it was formed of moraines from the older ice ages, thus being made up of a till core, which is now apparent in the island's west and centre by the cliff, dunes and beach. This sandy core began to erode as it was exposed to a strong current along the island's steep basement when the sea level rose 8000 years ago. During the process, sediments were accumulated north and south of the island. The west coast, which was originally situated 10 kilometres (6 miles) off today's shore, was thus gradually moved eastward, while at the same time the island began to extend to the north and south. After the ice ages, marshland began to form around this geestland core.

In 1141, Sylt is recorded as an island, yet before the Grote Mandrenke flood it belonged to a landscape cut by tidal creeks and, at least during low tide, it could be reached on foot. It is only since this flood that the creation of a spit from sediments began to form the current characteristic shape of Sylt. It is the northern and southern edges of Sylt which were, and still are, the subject of greatest change. For example, Listland was separated from the rest of the island in the 14th century and from the later 17th century onwards the Königshafen (King's Harbour) began to silt up as the "elbow" spit began to form.

In addition to the constant loss of land, the inhabitants during the Little Ice Age were constrained by sand drift. Dunes shifting to the east threatened settlements and arable land and had to be stopped by the planting of marram grass in the 18th century. Consequently, though, material breaking off the island was increasingly washed away and the island's extent continued to decrease.

Records of the annual land loss exist since 1870. According to them, Sylt lost an annual 0.4 metres (16 inches) of land in the north and 0.7 metres (28 inches) in the south from 1870 to 1951. From 1951 to 1984, the rate increased to 0.9 and 1.4 metres (35 and 55 inches) respectively, while shorelines at the island's very edges at Hörnum and List are even more affected.

Severe storm surges of the last decades have repeatedly endangered Sylt to the point of breaking in two, e.g. Hörnum was temporarily cut off from the island in 1962. Part of the island near Rantum which is only 500 metres (yards) wide is especially threatened.

Hundreds of sheep are roaming freely at Ellenbogen in List on Sylt.

The Wadden Sea on the east side between Sylt and the mainland has been a nature reserve and bird sanctuary since 1935 and is part of the Schleswig-Holstein Wadden Sea National Park. The construction of breakwaters in this area will abate sedimentation and is used for land reclamation.

Also the grazing of sheep on the sea dikes and heaths of Sylt eventually serves coastal management, since the animals keep the vegetation short and compress the soil with their hooves. Thus they help create a denser dike surface, which in case of storm surges provides less area for the waves to impact.

=== Flora and fauna ===
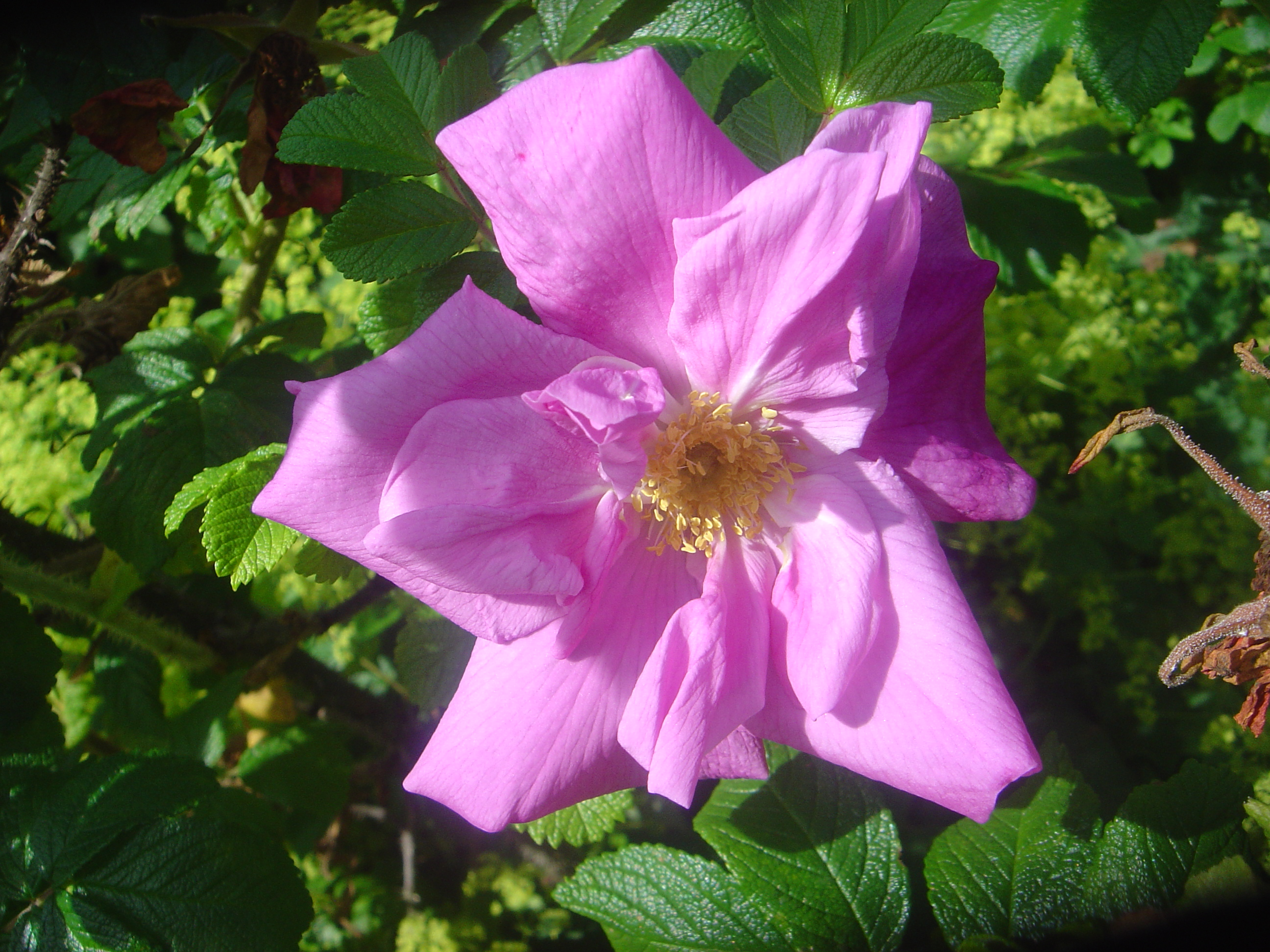
Rosa rugosa, known as "Sylt rose" on the island.

The flora of Sylt is shaped by the island's original sparseness. Until the mid 19th century, Sylt was an island almost completely devoid of trees except for small areas of forest and bush created by plantations. Today, one can still recognize the man-made origin of the Friedrichshain and Südwäldchen forests in Westerland where many of the trees stand in rank and file. Also, the now widespread rose Rosa rugosa, known as the "Sylt rose" on the island was imported to Sylt. It originates from the Kamchatka peninsula in Siberia. The undemanding rose met ideal conditions on Sylt and spread so quickly that it is now a common sight on the island. Its proliferation is viewed critically from a biological point of view, since it threatens to displace endangered local species, especially on the heaths.

The ample heaths on the eastern side of the island provide habitats for many rare species of plants and animals which are adapted to the extreme conditions such as drought, warmth, wind. About 2,500 animal species and 150 species of plants have so far been recorded. 45% of those plants are on the IUCN Red List. Especially notable are the 600 species of butterflies that live in the heaths, small tortoiseshell, brimstone, painted lady and peacock butterfly among them.

With several thousand individuals in the dune belt of Sylt, the natterjack toad, endangered in Germany, has one of Germany's largest populations here. Their spawning places are wet dune slacks and shallow, short-lived pools. For a habitat they prefer sandy areas with vegetation, but the species has also been observed on the top of the Uwe Dune. The main threat for this species on Sylt is road traffic.

The many water birds and other coastal avians that have their hatching grounds on Sylt or use the island for resting on their migrations constitute an ornithological feature. There are two notable hatching areas on Sylt, the Königshafen bay with the small island Uthörn in the north and the Rantum basin in the southeast. Birds that hatch on Sylt include black-headed gull, Arctic tern, pied avocet, common redshank, common gull, oystercatcher, northern lapwing, common shelduck and tufted duck. During the migration, Sylt is a resting spot for thousands of brent geese and shelducks, Eurasian wigeons and common eiders, as well as bar-tailed godwits, red knots, dunlins and Eurasian golden plovers. Ringed plover, common snipe, ruff and other species are less common visitors to the island.

Regarding land mammals, there is no significant difference from the neighbouring areas of mainland Nordfriesland. Primarily European hare, rabbit and roe deer can be found and are also hunted as game on the island. When the island was connected to the mainland by the causeway, red fox and European badger also became common.

West of Sylt a breeding area of harbour porpoises is located. In addition, great numbers of harbour seals and grey seals, the latter being rather uncommon in German seas, can be found on sand banks off Sylt.

Numerous associations and societies that care for the exploration and the protection of endangered animals and plants have branches on Sylt. Among them are the Alfred-Wegener-Institute for Polar and Marine Research, Verein Jordsand and Wadden Sea Conservation Station. Also the Federal Office for the Environment operates a research station in the dunes at Westerland.

=== Climate ===
On Sylt, a marine climate influenced by the Gulf Stream is predominant. With an average of 2 °C (36 °F), winter months are slightly milder than on the mainland, summer months though, with a median of 17 °C (63 °F), are somewhat cooler, despite a longer sunshine period. The annual average sunshine period on Sylt is 4.4 hours per day. It is due to the low relief of the shoreline that Sylt had a total of 1,899 hours of sunshine in 2005, 180 hours above the German average. Clouds cannot accumulate as quickly and are generally scattered by the constant westerly or northwesterly winds.

The annual mean temperature is 8.5 °C (47.3 °F). The annually averaged wind speed measures 6.7 m/s (15 mph), predominantly from western directions. The annual rainfall amounts to about 650 millimetres (25½"). Since 1937 weather data are collected at Deutscher Wetterdienst's northernmost station on a dune near List, which has meanwhile become automated. A number of commercial meteorological services like Meteomedia AG operate stations in List too.

Sylt features an oceanic climate that is influenced by the Gulf Stream. On average, the winter season is slightly warmer than in mainland Nordfriesland. The summer season, however, is cooler despite longer sunshine periods. The yearly average sunshine period is greater than 4.4 hours per day with some years exceeding the average sunshine for all of Germany. Also precipitation is lower than on the mainland. This is due to the low relief of Sylt's shoreline where clouds are not able to accumulate and rain off.

Climate data for List (1961–1990 averages)
Month	Jan	Feb	Mar	Apr	May	Jun	Jul	Aug	Sep	Oct	Nov	Dec	Year
Daily mean °C (°F)	1.0 (33.8)	0.9 (33.6)	2.7 (36.9)	6.0 (42.8)	10.8 (51.4)	14.2 (57.6)	15.7 (60.3)	16.2 (61.2)	13.9 (57.0)	10.4 (50.7)	6.1 (43.0)	2.8 (37.0)	8.4 (47.1)
Average precipitation mm (inches)	57.3 (2.26)	35.1 (1.38)	44.9 (1.77)	39.5 (1.56)	41.5 (1.63)	55.9 (2.20)	62.1 (2.44)	72.1 (2.84)	82.5 (3.25)	88.5 (3.48)	94.3 (3.71)	71.6 (2.82)	745.3 (29.34)
Mean monthly sunshine hours	46.7	75.3	120.1	179.3	243	246.5	230.7	228.1	147.8	98.3	55.6	42.6	1,714
Source: German Meteorological Service

Climate data for List, (1990–2014 averages)
Month	Jan	Feb	Mar	Apr	May	Jun	Jul	Aug	Sep	Oct	Nov	Dec	Year
Daily mean °C (°F)	2.3 (36.1)	2.2 (36.0)	4.3 (39.7)	8.2 (46.8)	12.1 (53.8)	14.8 (58.6)	17.7 (63.9)	18.0 (64.4)	15.0 (59.0)	10.8 (51.4)	6.5 (43.7)	3.3 (37.9)	9.6 (49.3)
Average precipitation mm (inches)	49.9 (1.96)	38.4 (1.51)	33.5 (1.32)	31.1 (1.22)	37.8 (1.49)	47.6 (1.87)	54.3 (2.14)	84.8 (3.34)	77.6 (3.06)	85.1 (3.35)	69.3 (2.73)	61.8 (2.43)	670.8 (26.41)
Mean monthly sunshine hours	46.74	67.1	129.2	179.5	221.1	209.8	215.3	189.8	137.9	97.2	51.1	42.6	1,587.2
Source: WeatherOnline.co.uk

Climate data for List, (2019–present averages)
Month	Jan	Feb	Mar	Apr	May	Jun	Jul	Aug	Sep	Oct	Nov	Dec	Year
Daily mean °C (°F)	6.3 (43.3)	5.6 (42.1)	5.6 (42.1)	8.4 (47.1)	10.6 (51.1)	16.9 (62.4)	15.8 (60.4)	18.7 (65.7)	14.9 (58.8)	11.1 (52.0)	6.4 (43.5)	6.1 (43.0)	10.5 (51.0)
Average precipitation mm (inches)	62.9 (2.48)	99.1 (3.90)	25.9 (1.02)	15.0 (0.59)	14.0 (0.55)	63.2 (2.49)	79.7 (3.14)	70.4 (2.77)	151.9 (5.98)	125.6 (4.94)	124.8 (4.91)	38.9 (1.53)	871.4 (34.3)
Mean monthly sunshine hours	33.6	52.6	194.3	239.2	268.0	277.1	187.1	250.6	153.3	101.7	30.0	38.1	1,825.6
Source: WeatherOnline.co.uk

Climate data for Sylt
Month	Jan	Feb	Mar	Apr	May	Jun	Jul	Aug	Sep	Oct	Nov	Dec	Year
Average sea temperature °C	4.7	3.7	4.6	8.0	12.1	16.0	18.4	19.1	17.2	13.5	10.0	6.5	11.2
Mean daily daylight hours	8.0	10.0	12.0	14.0	16.0	17.0	16.0	15.0	13.0	11.0	9.0	8.0	12.4
Average Ultraviolet index	0	1	2	4	5	6	7	6	4	2	1	0	3
Source: Weather Atlas

=== Coastal Protection ===
As early as the 19th century, groynes made of wooden piles were constructed as coastal protection measures against constant erosion. These structures, built at right angles to the coast and extending out into the sea, were later replaced by metal groynes and, eventually, by reinforced concrete groynes.

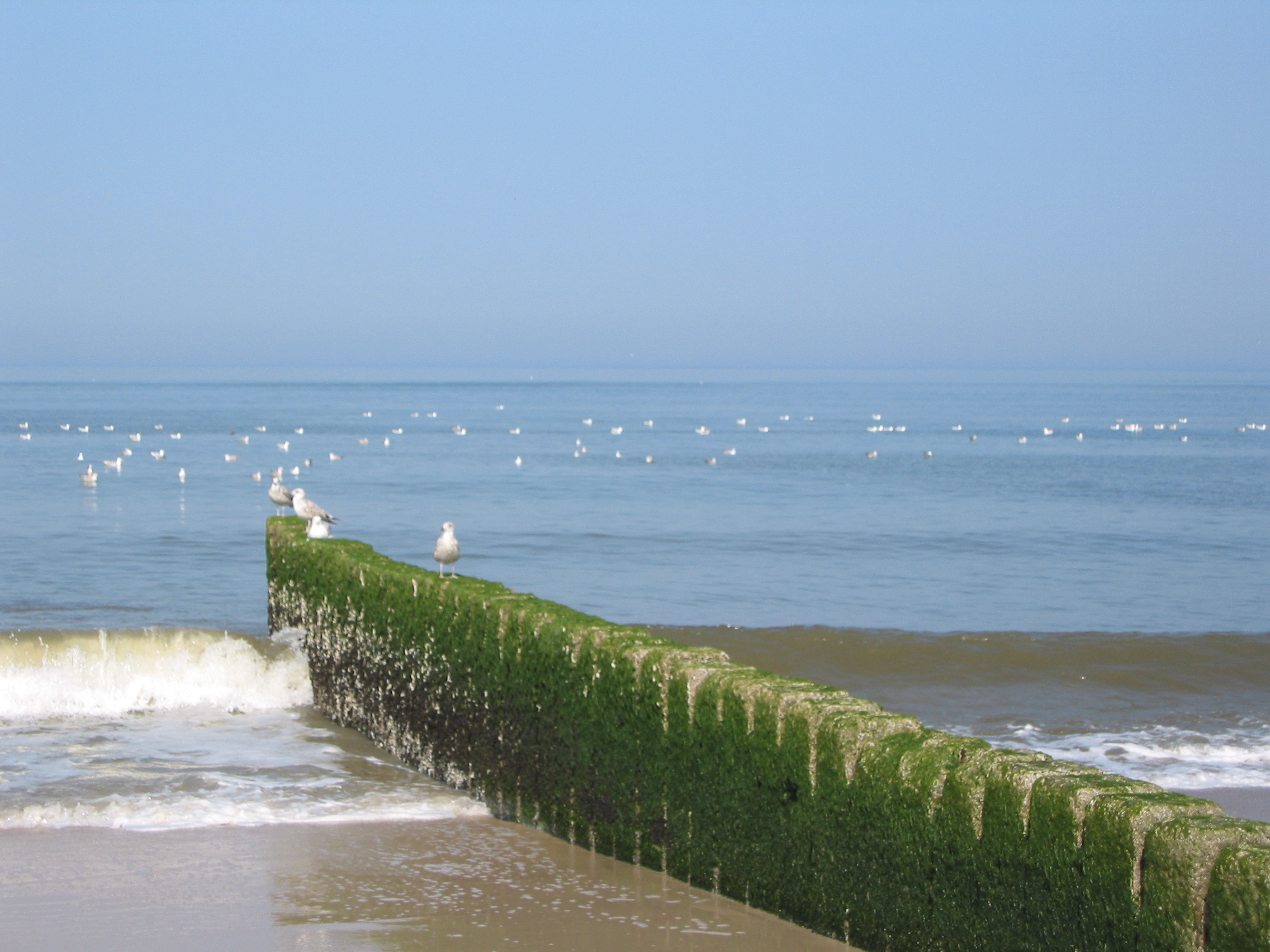
An armoured concrete groyne at Westerland

However, in the long term, these structures did not achieve the desired results. They are unable to stop the erosion caused by cross-currents, as the 'lee erosion' occurring on the side of a groyne sheltered from the wind and currents prevents sustained sand deposition.

In the 1960s, so-called tetrapods ('four-legged structures') were used and were placed along the base of the dunes along the base of the dunes or – much like groynes – out into the sea. However, the concrete elements, weighing around six tonnes, were too heavy for the conditions prevailing on Sylt's beach and were unable to halt the erosion. Consequently, some of them were removed from the western beach at Hörnum from mid-2005 onwards.

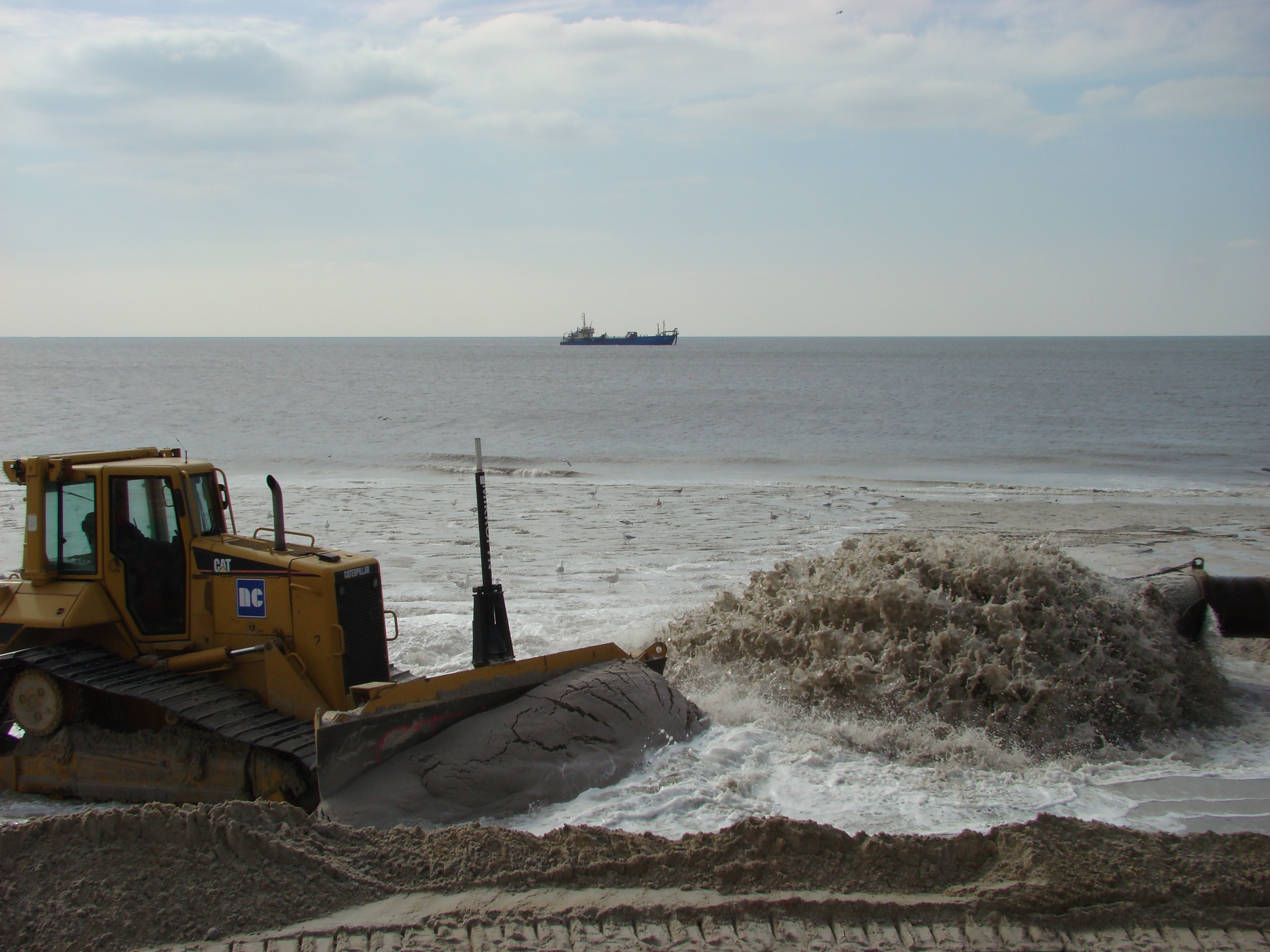
Sand replenishment on Sylt island: the sand, extracted by a hopper dredger from the sea, is spread by a bulldozer.

Since the early 1970s, sand has been dredged and deposited off the island's coast as the only effective measure against erosion to date. Special dredgers, known as 'hopper dredgers', take sand into their holds from a specially designated area located far offshore. They then sail close to the coast and discharge a mixture of water and sand onto the beach through pipelines. Bulldozers are used to spread the sand. The aim is simply to replace the pre-deposited sand that has been washed away by storm surges – thereby protecting the actual natural coastline and slowing down erosion. This approach involves considerable costs. The annual cost of up to 10 million euros is currently covered by funding from the federal government, the state and the European Union. Since 1972, around 60 million cubic metres of sand have been pre-flushed and deposited.

Despite all these measures, some experts fear that Sylt will suffer significant land loss by the middle of the 21st century. Progressive global warming is expected to lead to increased storm activity, which could result in greater land loss and, as an immediate consequence, the loss of, for example, the insurability of property.

== Settlements ==
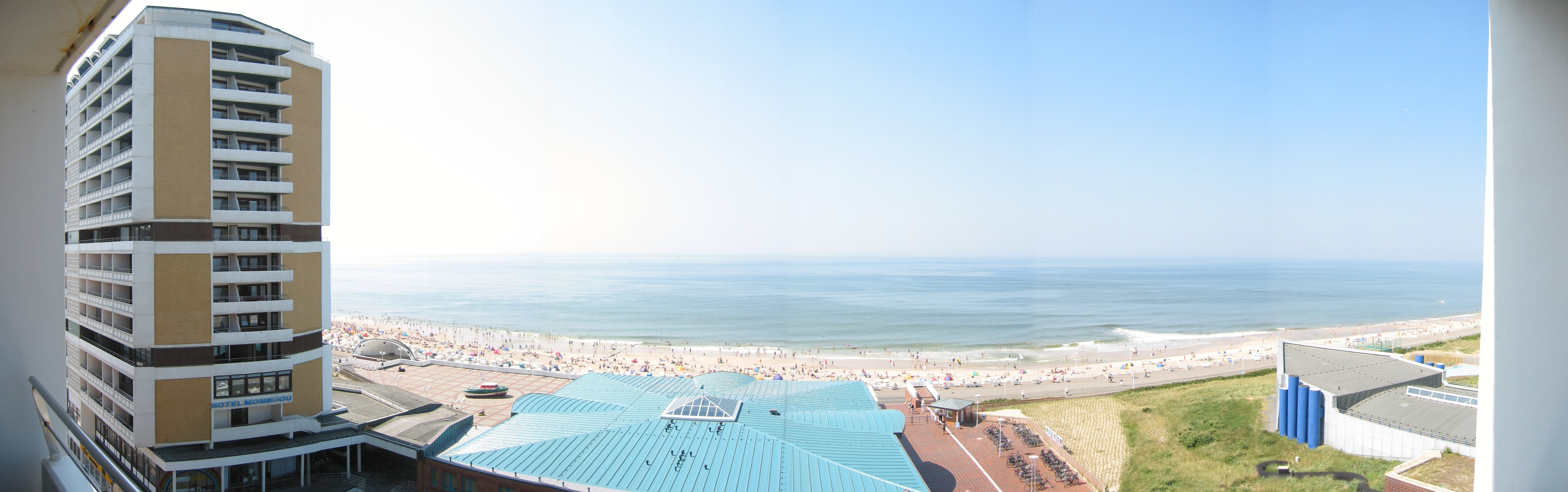
View from a hotel room in Westerland

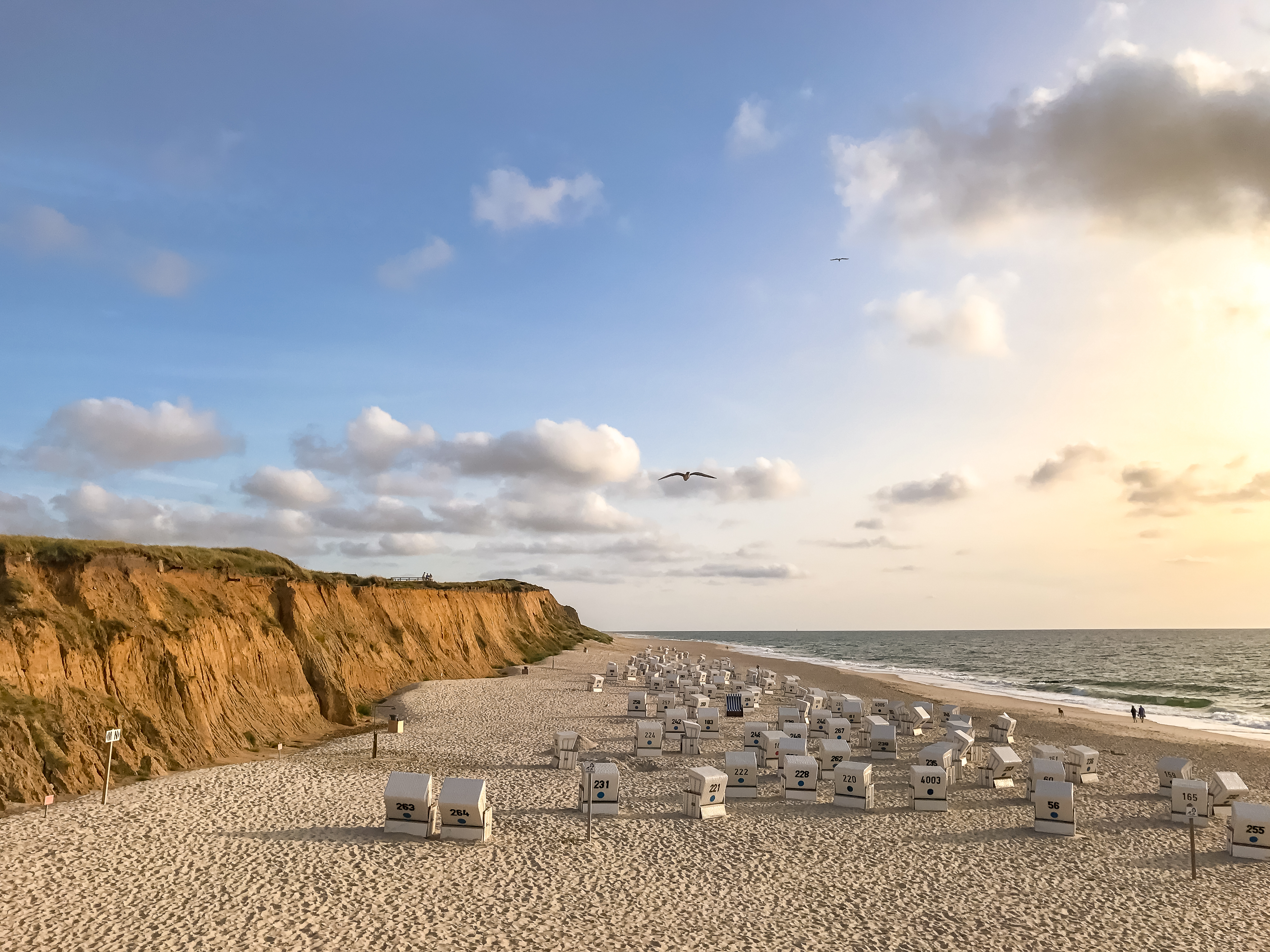
The red cliff next to Kampen, Sylt

Sylt is divided into two administrative bodies: the Amt Landschaft Sylt administers all municipalities on the island, save for the Gemeinde Sylt, which was established in 2009 from the formerly independent municipalities of Westerland, Rantum and Sylt-Ost. As of December 2007, Sylt had 21,190 inhabitants, 9,072 of whom living in Westerland. These numbers do not include owners of summer residences.

A referendum held in May 2008 resulted in a merger of the Sylt-Ost municipality with the town of Westerland on 1 January 2009. Various interest groups hope to merge every island municipality into one governing body.

=== Settlements along the west coast ===
Six municipalities are situated along the west coast of Sylt. List in the very north of the island constitutes Germany's northernmost municipality; it retained a certain independence due to its remote location and its long-time adherence to the kingdom of Denmark. On its eastern shore, a harbour is located where, in addition to tourist ships, the "Sylt-Express" ferry-boat sails to Havneby on the Danish island of Rømø. Wenningstedt together with Braderup and Kampen used to form the Norddörfer (Northern Villages) municipality, an early intercommunal association, which partly remains today in form of a school union. While Kampen, mainly in the 1950s and 1960s, was famous in Germany for attracting celebrities, Wenningstedt has been known as a "family resort" for more than 100 years. Since 1855, the prominent black and white Kampen Lighthouse has been located between Kampen and Wenningstedt; it is the oldest one on the island. East of there, the Braderuper Heide nature reserve is situated. Right south of Wenningstedt are the town limits of the island's largest town, Westerland.

After the complete destruction of the village Eidum by a storm surge on 1 November 1436, the survivors founded a new village northeast of their old home: Westerland. The name was first recorded in 1462. In 1865, a seaside spa was founded and, 50 years later, Westerland was granted town privileges. In 1949, it was officially recognised as a health resort. In 2007, the town numbered 9,072 citizens.

South of Westerland, the island extends for about 15 km (9.3 mi) in the form of a spit, until it is cut by the Hörnumtief tidal creek that runs through the Wadden Sea mudflats east of Sylt. Here is the location of Rantum. This village, like no other on Sylt, had to fight sand drift during the past centuries. Many farmsteads and a church had to be abandoned because of shifting dunes moving eastward. Only the planting of marram grass stopped the dunes and put an end to this threat. To the east, there are a few scattered spots of marshland, but the area is mostly dominated by dunes.

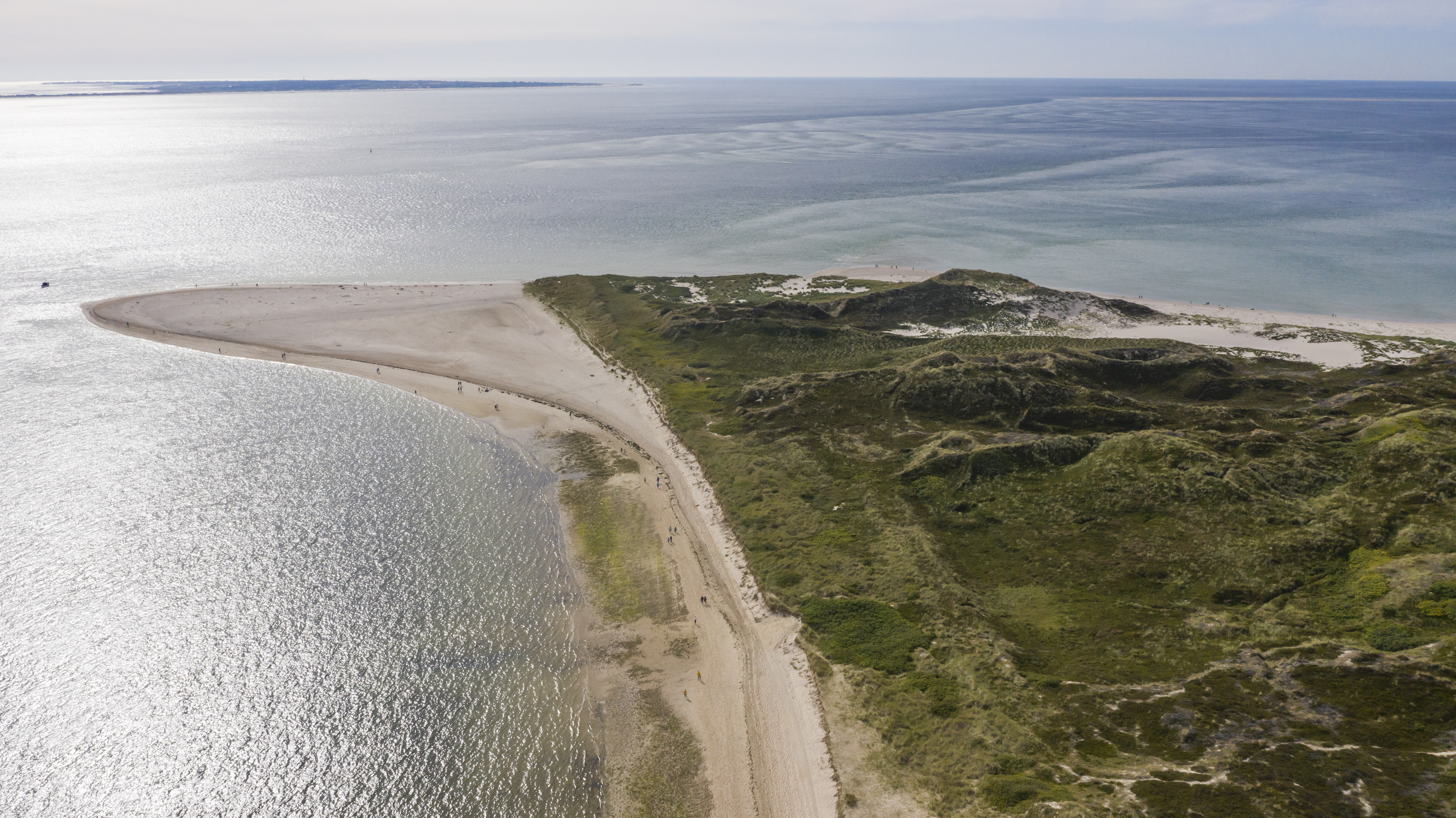
Aerial view of Hörnum-Odde, Sylt, Schleswig-Holstein, Germany

Hörnum on the island's southern headland is the youngest village. It was founded shortly after 1900, although the uninhabited southern tip of Sylt was said to serve as refuge for pirates and fishermen. The name Budersand in the area emanates from that custom, marking a great dune where booths (German: Buden) stood in former times to serve as shelters. This southern headland, called Odde, is marked by continuous loss of land. Each year great amounts of sand are washed away by storm floods and coastal management has not yet seen sustainable effects in the area, so that further losses have to be expected.

=== Sylt-Ost ===
Sylt-Ost (East Sylt) is a former municipality which was formed in 1970 out of several small villages on the Nössehalbinsel of Sylt. The population (as of 2000) was 5,500. The villages included Tinnum, Munkmarsch, Archsum, Morsum and Keitum. In 2009, Sylt-Ost merged with Westerland and Rantum to form Gemeinde Sylt.

== History ==
Geographically, Sylt was originally part of Jutland (today Schleswig-Holstein and mainland Denmark), with evidence of human habitation going back to 3000 BC at Denghoog. The first settlements of Frisians appeared during the 8th century and 9th century. In 1386, Sylt was divided between the Duke of Schleswig and the King of Denmark; except for the village of List, Sylt became part of the Duchy of Schleswig in 1435.

During the 17th and 18th century, whaling, fishing and oyster breeding increased the wealth of the population. At this time, Keitum became the capital of the island, and a place for rich captains to settle down. In the 19th century, tourism began. Westerland replaced Keitum as the capital. During World War I, Sylt became a military outpost. On 25 March 1916, British seaplanes bombed the German airship sheds on Sylt. The main connection for tourists was boats from Højer. Since Højer was ceded to Denmark in 1920, a rail causeway to the mainland was built in 1927, the Hindenburgdamm, named after Paul von Hindenburg. During World War II, Sylt became a fortress, with concrete bunkers built below the dunes at the shore, some of which are still visible today. Lager Sylt, the concentration camp on Alderney was named after the island. Rudolf Höss hid on the island after Nazi Germany's defeat, but he was later captured and brought to trial in Poland.

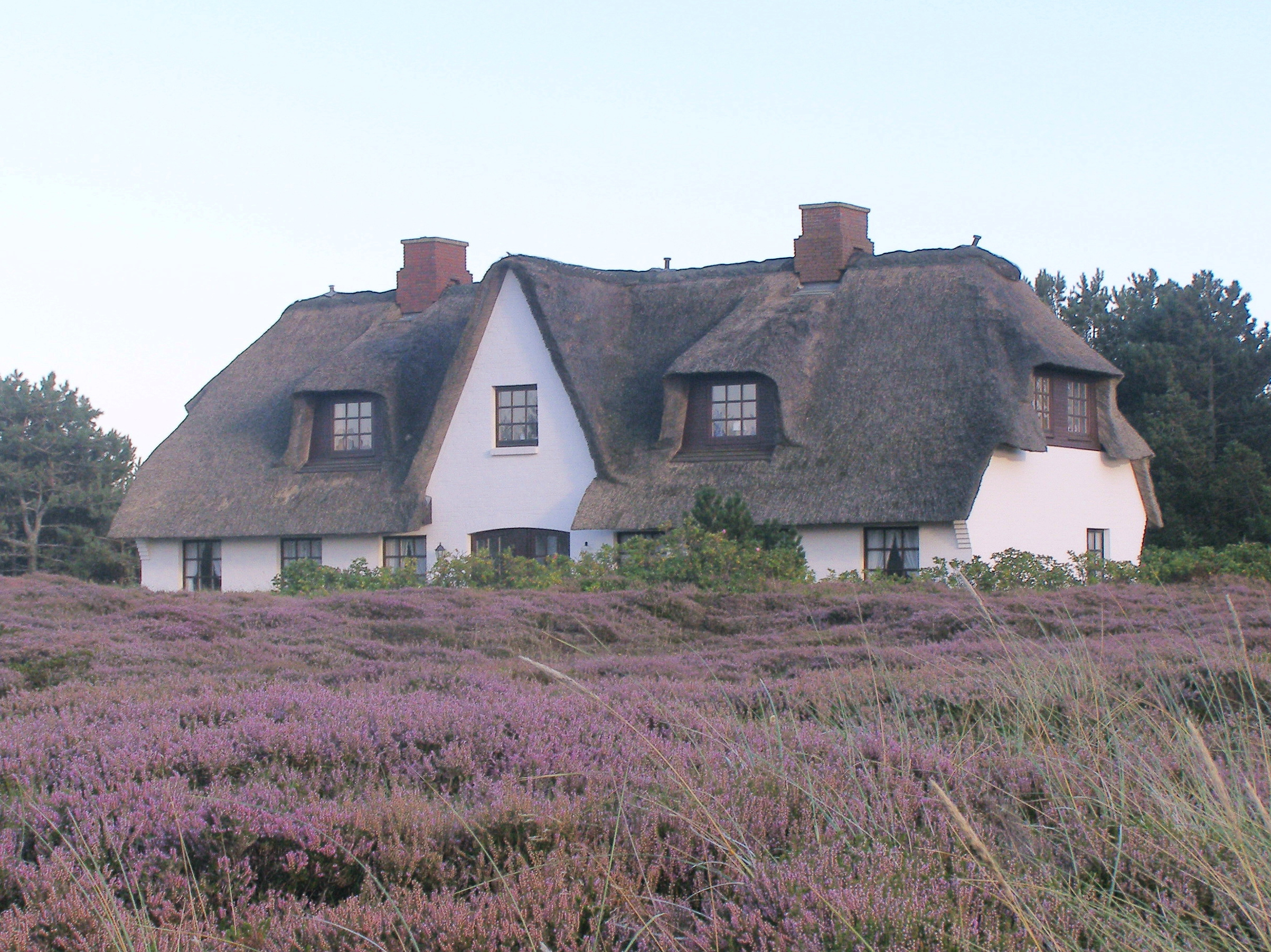
A typical Frisian house with a thatched roof at Munkmarsch (Sylt, Germany)

Tourism has been of considerable importance on Sylt for over 100 years, ever since Westerland became a seaside resort in 1855. Health cures on Sylt quickly became fashionable amongst the upper and middle classes, leading to an economic reorientation for the people of Sylt. In the early decades, visitors usually stayed for several weeks to benefit from the healing effects of the invigorating climate and, during this time, expected a suitable programme of entertainment, which in turn attracted a corresponding audience. Away from the main towns, after the end of the First World War, rural boarding schools for children from the big cities were set up in former barracks.

The beach promenade in Westerland. A multi-story apartment complex can be seen in the background.

During the First and Second World Wars, the island was declared a restricted area and tourism came to a complete standstill. The immediate post-war years were marked by hunger and unemployment. Vacant hotels were often occupied by war refugees, and spa operations came to a complete standstill. It was not until after the currency reform that the first post-war spa guests were recorded during the summer season of 1949. Since then, the number of overnight stays has risen steadily. Around 1960, tourism experienced an upswing. In addition to the previously affluent spa guests, Sylt now also attracted larger crowds. The townscape of Westerland underwent a profound transformation. Whereas previously the townscape had been characterised only by a few large hotels, alongside traditional Frisian houses with thatched roofs and Wilhelmine-style seaside villas, the 'new spa centre' now saw the emergence of apartment blocks up to 14 storeys high. Gradually, these modern complexes replaced the villas and guesthouses. These apartment blocks from the 1960s and 1970s now characterise the town centre of Westerland, whilst the other towns on the island were largely spared this intensive development.

== Economy ==
Sylt's economy is almost completely dependent on tourism. As of 2024, the island had over 62,000 guest beds and 900,000 visitors a year, accounting for around 6.75 million overnight stays – an average of 7.35 overnight stays per guest. More than 72 per cent of holidaymakers on Sylt are regular visitors, over 50 per cent of whom are aged over 55. 98 per cent of Sylt's visitors come from Germany.

As a result of the tourism sector's dominance, the retail sector, the hospitality industry, the service sector and the skilled trades are all tailored to the needs of visitors and landlords. Since the mid-1970s, agriculture and seafaring have played an increasingly minor role in the island's social structure; only in East Sylt are there still active farms and businesses in the agricultural, livestock and timber sectors. The last remaining industrial enterprise, Beyschlag Werke, left the island in 1974 due to rising land prices and transport links that were unfavourable to the company.

Tourism activity on the island has contributed to rising housing prices, gentrification, and demographic shifts due to young people moving away from the island in search of cheaper housing. As a result, a large proportion of the island's workforce consists of commuters. As of 2014, only 14 per cent of residents with their main residence on the island were under 20 years of age.

Tourism has also given rise to ecological concerns such as increasing land sealing due to new buildings, high traffic volumes caused by the large number of private cars brought onto the island, and disturbances in nature reserves and bird sanctuaries. At the same time, revenue from tourism helps to fund nature conservation measures.

== Culture ==
Sylt is a part of the Frisian Islands. It has its own local dialect, Söl'ring, which is the indigenous speech of Sylt. Söl'ring is a dialect of insular North Frisian, with elements of Danish, Dutch and English. The island has a museum called Altfriesisches Haus (Sölring Museen, Altfriesisches Haus in Keitum).

Only a small fraction of the population still speak Söl'ring. A law to promote Frisian (Friesisch-Gesetz) was passed in 2004. The northernmost part of the island, Listland, was traditionally Danish-speaking.

As in many areas in Schleswig-Holstein on New Year's Eve, groups of children go masked from house to house, reciting poems. This is known as Rummelpottlaufen, and as a reward, children receive sweets or money.

Since the mid-18th century, the vowel in the name of the island has been represented as "y" for unknown reasons, while older spellings are Sildt and Silt, allegedly derived from Danish sild "herring", or maybe related to English silt.

=== Events ===
The island of Sylt and the North Sea surrounding it host numerous sporting events almost all year round. Every spring, for example, up to 1.500 runners take part in the "Syltlauf". The 34.55-kilometre route runs from List, the northernmost village on the island, down to Hörnum in the south. Since 2023 the island is also hosting an ultra marathon – the so called "North Sea Ultra".

In summer, the traditional running at the ring-tournaments begin. Running at the ring, or ring-riding, is an equestrian sport. The rider, while galopping, must spear a small brass ring – 12 to 25 mm in diameter and loosely suspended on a cord between two posts – using a lance approximately two metres long. The highlight of every tournament is the ride to claim the title of king. The eight ring-riding clubs on Sylt have over 200 members and hold their tournaments in Archsum, Morsum and Keitum. Since 2021, the Schleswig-Holstein tradition of ring riding has been recognised as part of the state's Intangible Cultural Heritage.

In addition, numerous regattas and water sports competitions take place right through to autumn – primarily at Sylts westcoast in Westerland. These include the Wingfoil Masters Sylt, the Summer Opening, the Surf Cup Sylt, the Kitesurf World Cup Sylt, the RDC Catamaran Festival and the Windsurf World Cup Sylt. The latter is one of the longest-running windsurfing events in the world.

=== Freikörperkultur and nude bathing ===
At the beginning of the 20th century, the bathing beaches on Sylt were segregated by sex into "ladies' bath" (Damenbad) and "men's bath" (Herrenbad); one bathed in long bathing dresses of that time period. From the beginning of the 20th century, starting from the Free German Youth camp Klappholttal and the intellectuals and artists in the village of Kampen, a social movement developed that lived a beach life without clothing (part of the German Freikörperkultur – FKK and Lebensreform movement). The first official nude bathing beach in Germany was opened on Sylt in 1920. Nude bathing and sunbathing (also erroneously referred to as "nudist" or "nudism") spread over the entire island. "Sylt" was associated with nude bathing and the ideal environment for supporters of the Freikörperkultur (FKK). Since the 1960s, there have been designated nudist beaches (marked FKK-Strand) with names such as "Abyssinia", "Samoa" or "Zanzibar" on the entire west beach. The most famous nudist beach on Sylt became the "Groyne 16" (Buhne 16) in Kampen through regular reports in the tabloid media. Today the boundaries between nude and textile beaches are becoming more and more blurred. While nude beaches have lost some of their popularity, it is no longer unusual or sensational to bathe or sunbathe on "normal" beaches with no clothes on.

=== Viticulture ===
Schleswig-Holstein's (and therefore Germany's) northernmost vineyard is situated in Keitum on Sylt, on Munkmarscher Chaussee, near St Severin's Church.Not far to the south are further vineyards, tended by another winegrower. The vineyards on Sylt are also situated slightly further north than those on the neighbouring island of Föhr.

The Sylt white wine known as 'Sölviin' is made from the 'Solaris' grape variety and is grown using organic farming methods. In 2009, 2,700 vines were planted for the first time, and in 2018 the vineyard was expanded by a further 6,000 vines.

=== Sylt in painting ===
Among the first painters who discovered Sylt as a theme were Eugen Dücker and Eugen Bracht. Franz Korwan followed them. The painter Andreas Dirks was born in Tinnum on Sylt in 1865. He studied at the Düsseldorf Art Academy and in Weimar, lived in Düsseldorf since 1895, accepted a professorship there in 1916 and at the same time maintained a studio in Westerland. Ulrich Schulte-Wülwer described him as "the strongest artistic talent that the island has produced". Carl Arp came to Sylt in 1903. Painters like Emil Nolde, Erich Heckel, Anita Rée and Albert Aereboe moved to Sylt. Contemporary artists include the painters and sculptors Rainer Fetting and Ingo Kühl, who live in Berlin and on Sylt.

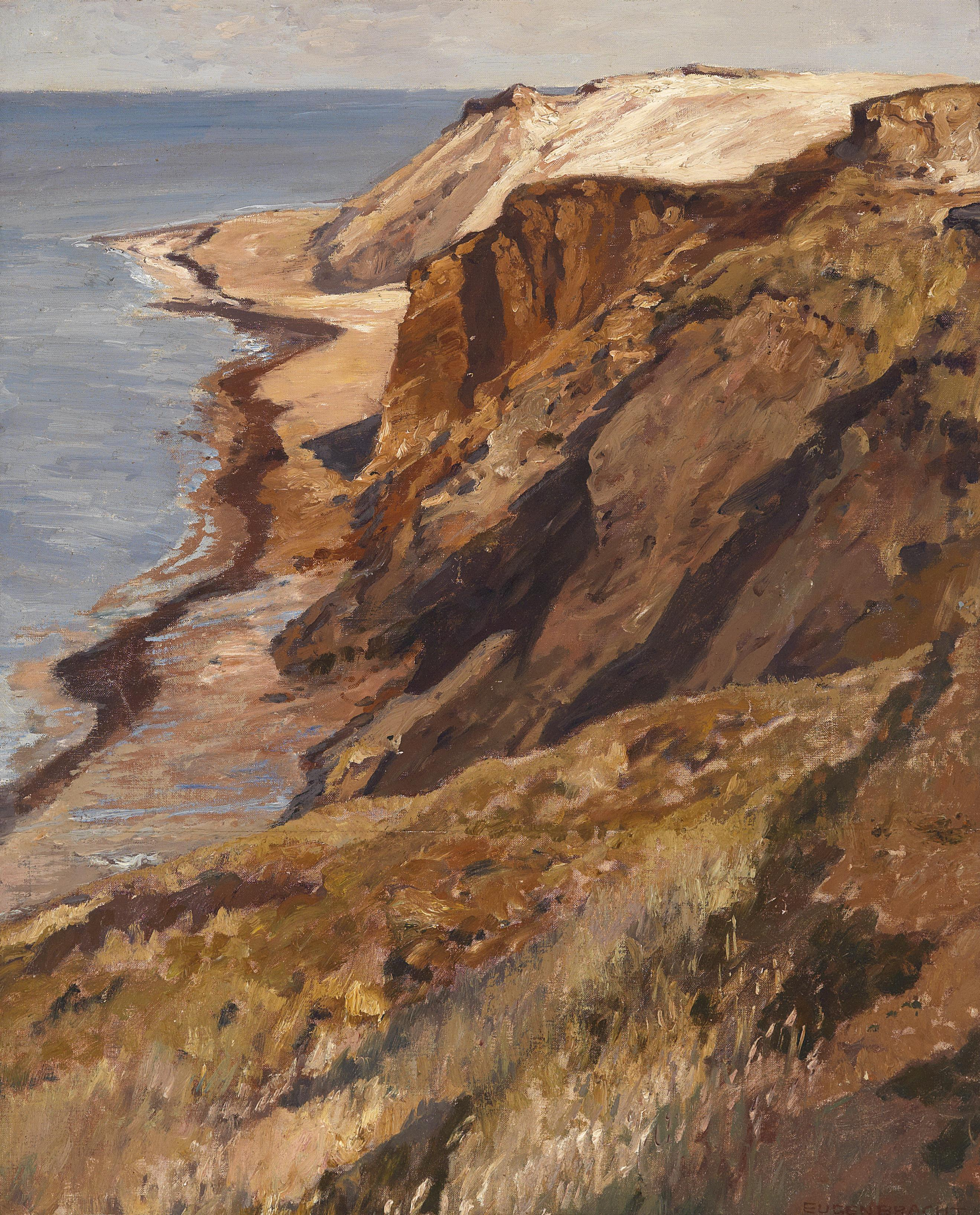
Eugen Bracht Küste auf Sylt (Morsum-Kliff), 1897, Oil on canvas 61.5 cm × 50.5 cm (24 1/4 in × 20 in)

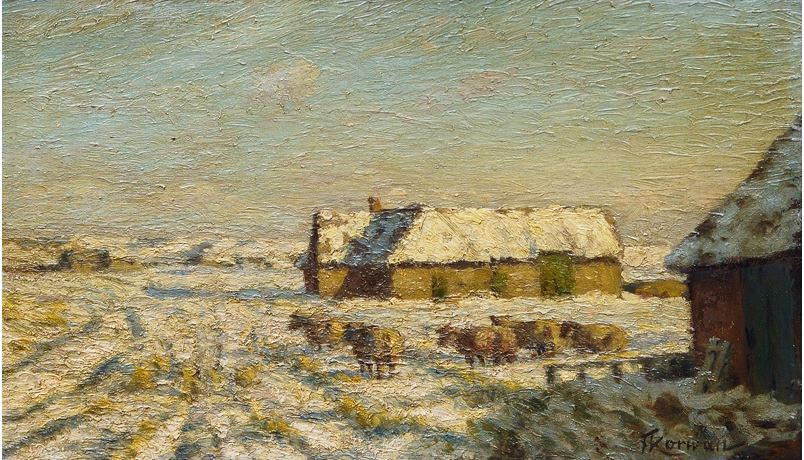
Franz Korwan Winter auf Sylt, Oil on wood 24 cm × 38 cm (9 1/2 in × 15 in), without year

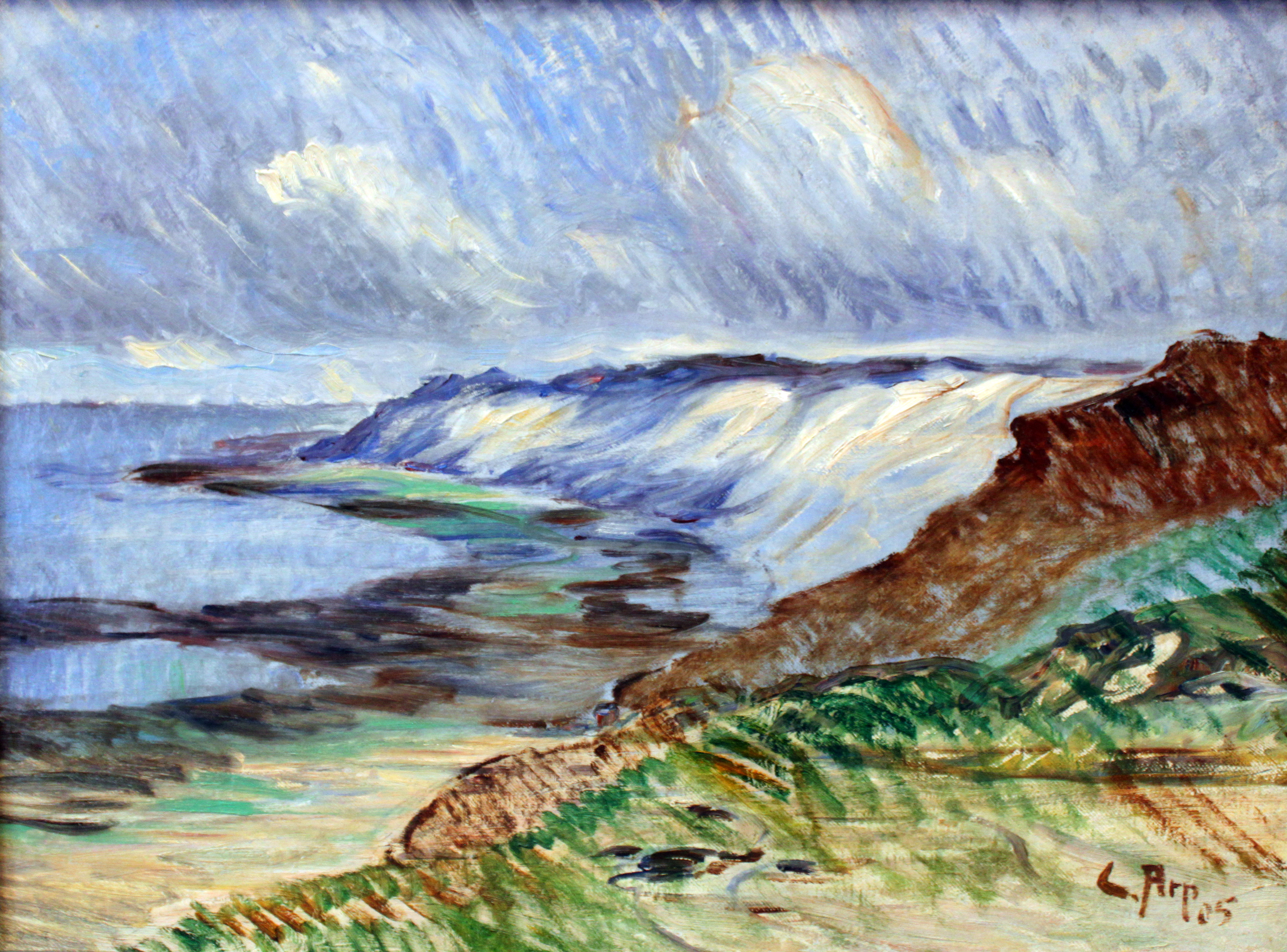
Carl Arp Küstenlandschaft auf Sylt (Morsumkliff) 1905, Oil on canvas 475 cm × 59.5 cm (187 in × 23 1/2 in), Museumsberg Flensburg

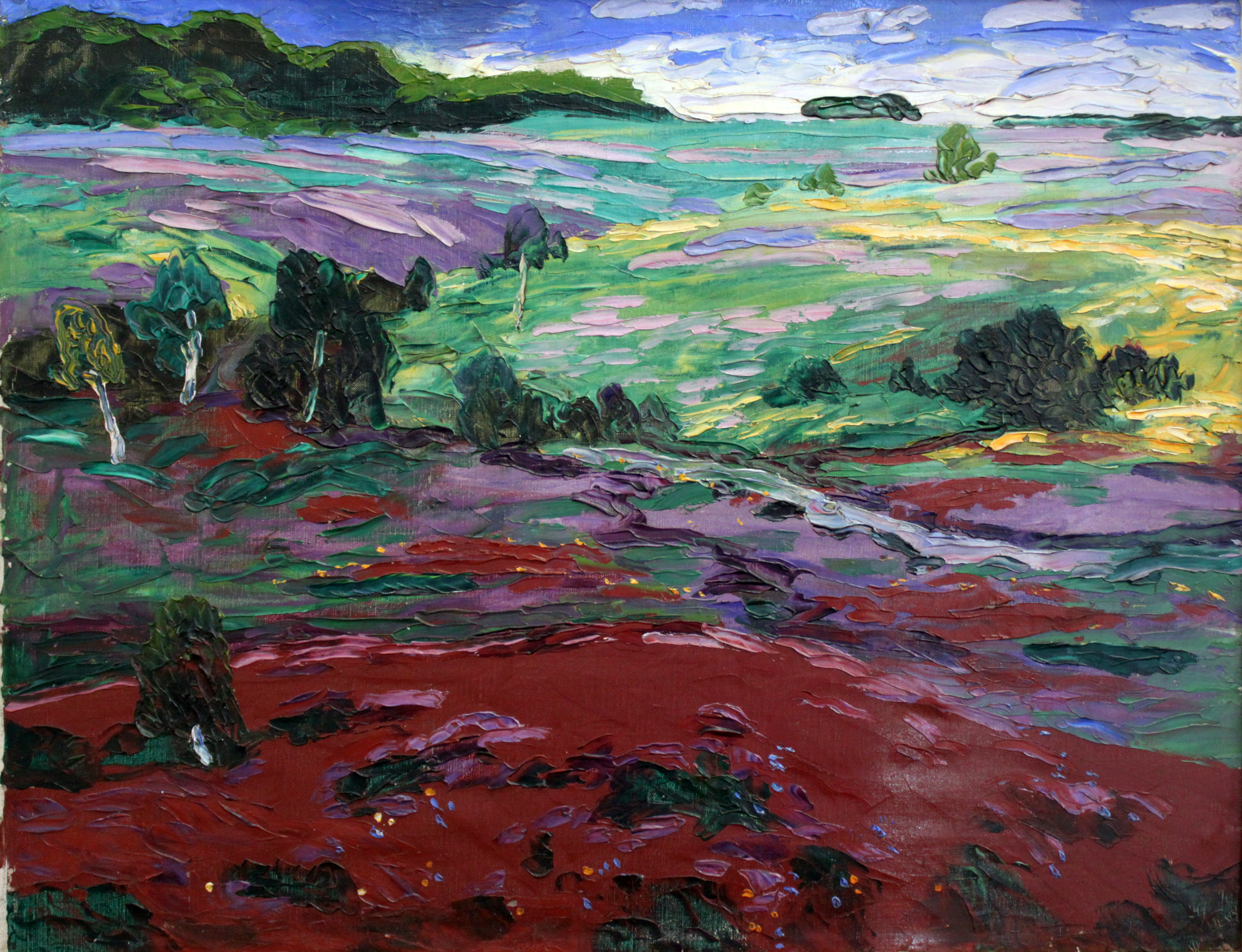
Wenzel Hablik Landschaft auf Sylt 1910, Oil on canvas, Museumsberg Flensburg

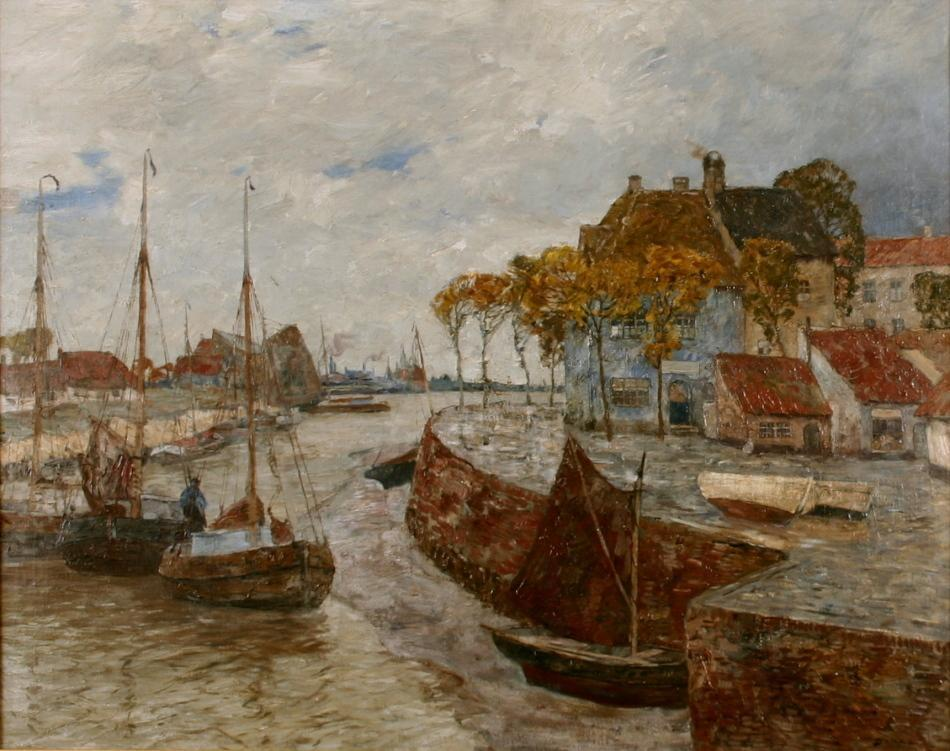
Andreas Dirks Munkmarschener Hafenansicht auf Sylt, 1922, Oil on canvas

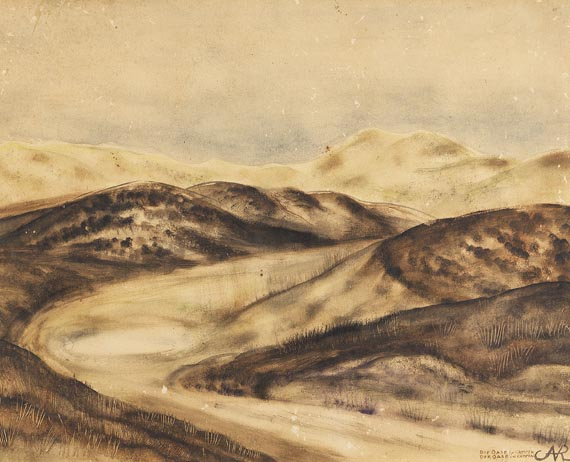
Anita Rée Die Oase in Kampen, 1932/33, Watercolor 39 cm × 49 cm (15 1/4 in × 19 1/4 in)

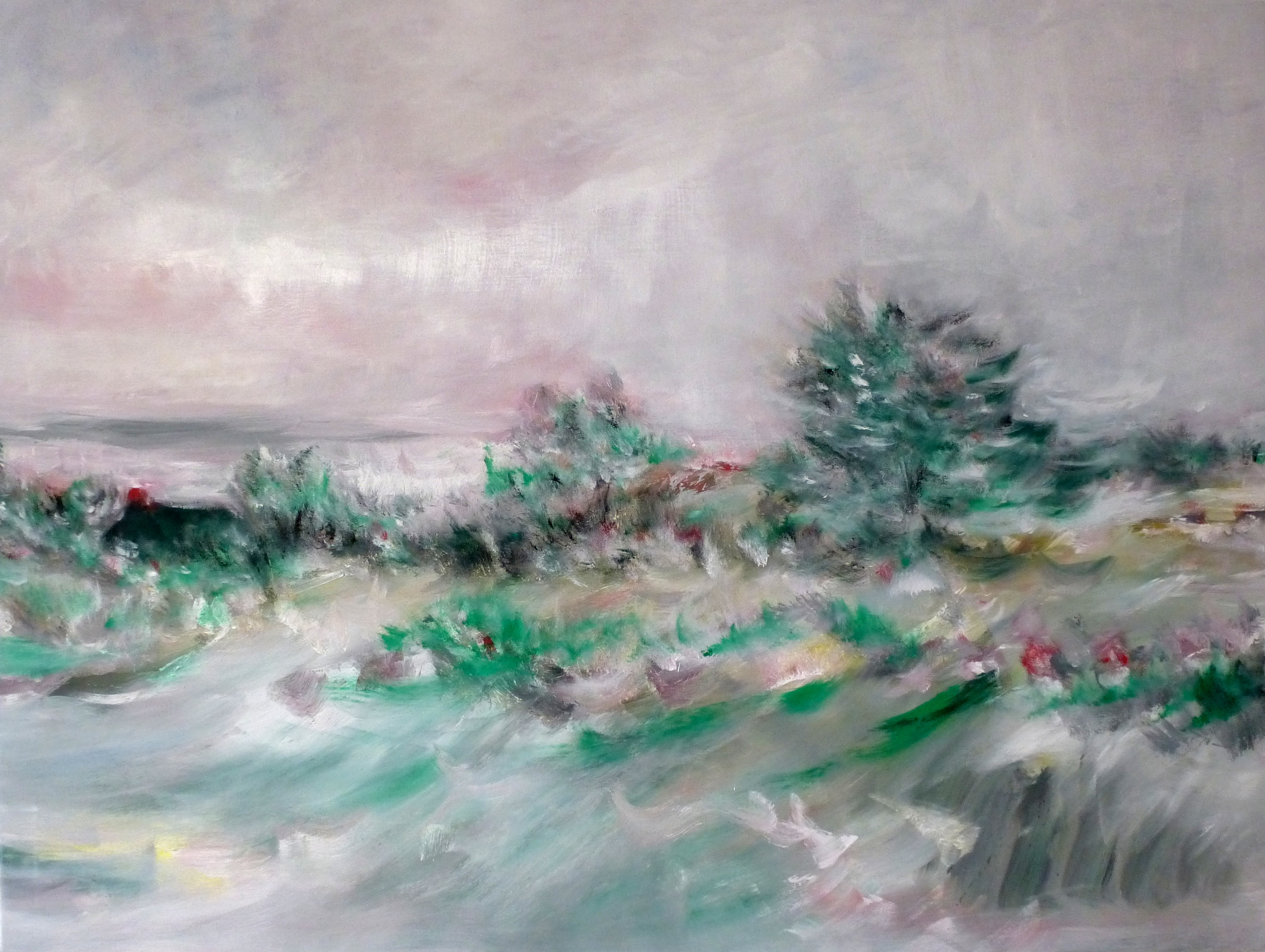
Ingo Kühl Haus am Watt, 2015, Oil on canvas 150 cm × 200 cm (59 in × 78 3/4 in)

== Notable people ==
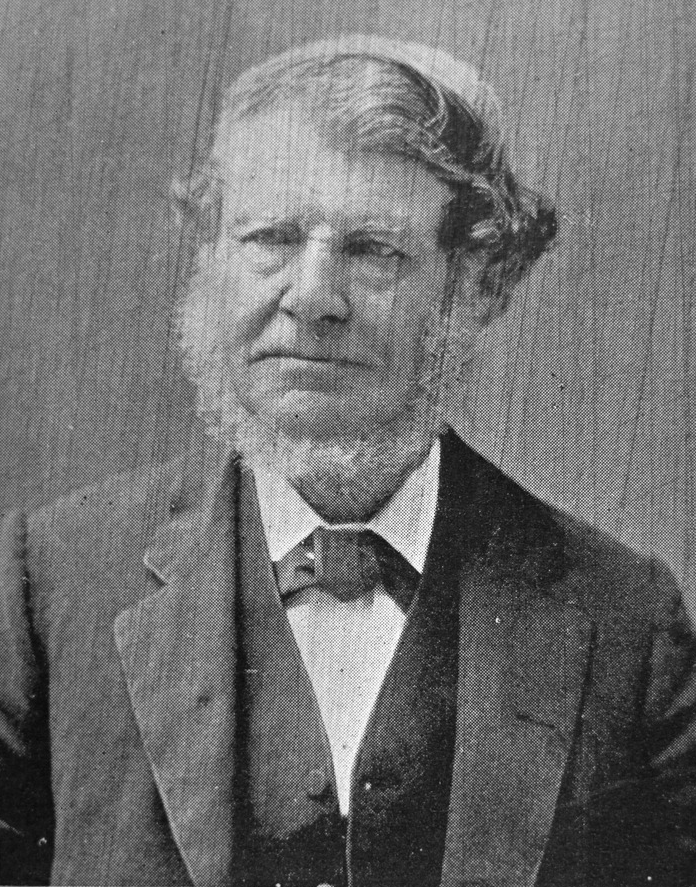
Cornelius Boy Jensen, 1814–1886

- Dirk Meinerts Hahn (born 1804 in Westerland, Sylt – 1860) best known as the captain of the ship Zebra that he captained to South Australia
- Cornelius Jensen (1814 in Sylt – 1886) a Danish sea captain for 20 years; arriving in San Francisco in 1848, he became a rancher, a vintner and served as a California politician.
- Henriette Hirschfeld-Tiburtius (1834 in Sylt – 1911) the first female dentist in Germany
- Gustav Jenner (1865 in Keitum – 1920) a German composer, conductor and musical scholar and the only formal composition pupil of Johannes Brahms
- Hermann von der Lieth-Thomsen (1867–1942 in Sylt) a German military aviation pioneer, lived in Sylt from 1928
- Margarete Boie (1880–1946) a German author in the 1920s incorporating the history, landscape and people of Sylt
- Anita Rée (1885–1933) a German-Jewish painter, lived and worked here
- Heinz Reinefarth (1903–1979) a German SS commander during World War II and government official in West Germany after the war. During the Warsaw Uprising of August 1944 his troops committed numerous atrocities. After the war Reinefarth became the mayor of Westerland and member of the Schleswig-Holstein Landtag. The subject of the East German short documentary Holiday on Sylt (1959).
- Boy Lornsen (1922 in Keitum – 1995) a German sculptor and author of children's literature
- Dora Heldt (born Bärbel Schmidt, 1961 in Sylt) a German author

== Transport ==
The "Marschbahn" connects Sylt with the mainland.

Sylt is connected to the German mainland by the Hindenburgdamm, a causeway with a railway line on top. The passenger trains connect Westerland (Sylt) to Niebüll or Klanxbüll, and the Deutsche Bahn's "Syltshuttle" as well as RDC's "Autozug Sylt", allow the transfer of cars and trucks between Westerland and Niebüll. There are also car ferry services to the nearby Danish island of Rømø, which offers a road connection to the mainland. Several german and international airlines offer direct flights to Sylt Airport at Westerland.

== In other media ==
The island was used during the filming of The Ghost Writer, as an alternate location for Martha's Vineyard, due to the film's director, Roman Polanski being unable to travel to the United States, due to an outstanding arrest warrant for rape. The ferry between the islands of Sylt and Rømø features prominently in the film.

== See also ==
- Üüs Söl'ring Lön', insular anthem
- Heinz Reinefarth, a Nazi-German military officer. The "Butcher of Warsaw" became mayor of Westerland after World War II.
- St. Niels
- Uthlande
