= Königshafen =

Northernmost bight of the island of Sylt in the state of Schleswig-Holstein, Germany

- Bight
- Coordinates: 55.04012°N 8.41443°E
- Part of: North Sea

Area
  - Total: 4.2 km^{2}
- Designation: National Park

The Königshafen ("king's harbour") is the northernmost bight of the North Frisian island of Sylt in the German state of Schleswig-Holstein and thus also the northernmost bay in Germany. The bay gets its name from its use as a natural harbour and its legal status as part of the Royal Danish enclave of Listland. The harbour was used until at least the 18th century and was later abandoned as it silted up.

== Location ==
The bay of Königshafen lies north of the Sylt coastal resort of List and southeast of the promontory of Ellenbogen, the northernmost point of Germany, on which stand the lighthouses of List East and List West, the two northernmost buildings in Germany. The bay has an area of roughly 4.2 km^{2} and opens towards the east onto the Wadden Sea; it is only separated from the open North Sea to the west by a spit which is just 300 metres wide. In the Königshafen lie the small uninhabited island of Uthörn with its bird reserve, and the Lister Haken.

== History ==
The natural harbour formed by the bight was valued in the past as a safe haven on the North Sea coast. In the Middle Ages, it was the most important port-of-call between the Danish town of Skagen to the north and the mouth of the River Elbe to the south Thus, for centuries, the Danish kings held Listland as a royal enclave.

However, according to contemporary accounts, the Königshafen began to silt up in the 18th century and became unusable for shipping. Until the mid-1980s NATO conducted regular air-to-ground firing exercises in the area.

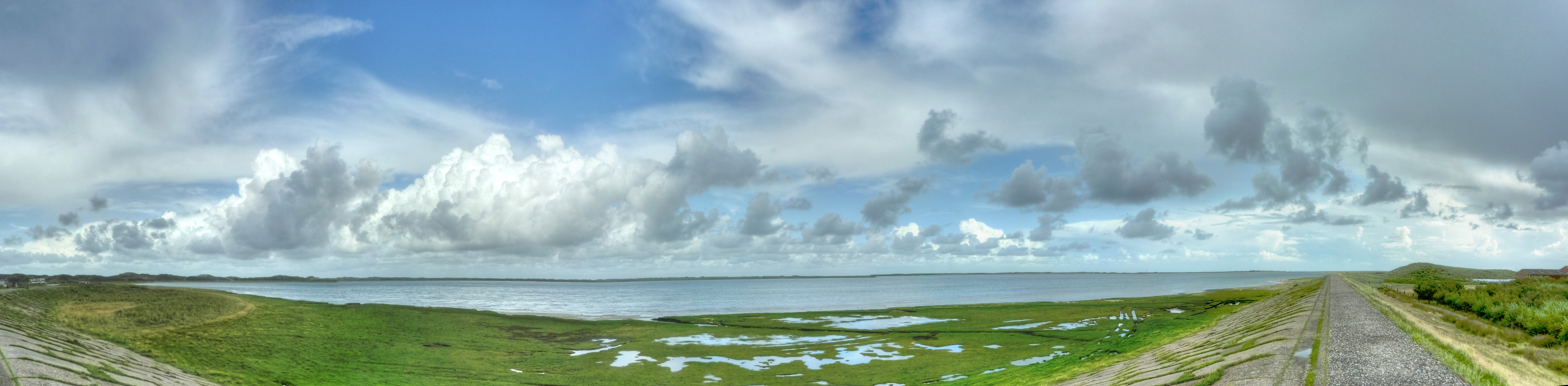
Panorama of the Königshafen on Sylt

== Today ==
Since 1985 the Königshafen has been part of the Schleswig-Holstein Wadden Sea National Park and access on foot or by vehicle is permitted only under certain conditions. Part of the bay in the northwest of the Königshafen is today a popular wind surfing area.
