= Üüs Söl'ring Lön' =

Insular anthem of Sylt

Üüs Söl'ring Lön' (Söl'ring North Frisian for "Our Sylter Land" or more loosely "Our Homeland Sylt") is the insular anthem of Sylt. The lyrics were written by C. P. Christiansen (1855–1922). It is sung annually at the Biikebrennen.

== Lyrics ==
Üüs Söl’ring Lön’, dü best üüs helig;
Dü blefst üüs ain, dü best üüs Lek!
Din Wiis tö hual’en, sen wü welig;
Di Söl’ring Spraak auriit wü ek.
Wü bliiv me di ark Tir forbün’en,
Sa lung üs wü üp Warel’ sen.
Uk diar jaar Uuning bütlön’ fün’en,
Ja leng dach altert tö di hen.

Chorus:
Kumt Riin,
Kumt Senenskiin,
Kum junk of lekelk Tiren,
Tö Söl’ wü hual’
Aural;
Wü bliiv truu Söl’ring Liren!

Di Seewinj soong me litjem Suusin,
Hur ik üp Söl’ üs Dütji slöp;
Fan Strön’ jertik dit eewig Bruusin,
Üs ik bi Mooters Hun’ jit löp.
Ik haa di Stairer al bihöl’en,
Diar jens üüs Jungens Hemelrik,
Di Teft ön Uursem, fol fan Krölen,
Üüs Spölplaats bi di Bosk üp Dik.

Chorus

Üüs Taachten hual’ jit fast omslüngen,
Wat üüs fan litj ap wert en lef:
Üüs Terp, hur wü tö Skuul jens gingen,
Üüs Mark, üüs Hiir’, di Wai bi Klef,
Ark Stich, hur wü üs Jungen ronen,
Ark Stegelk, diar aur Eeker gair,
Di Hooger, hur wü Biike bronen:
Hat es jit ales üp sin Stair.

Chorus

Di Hooger se sa stolt wü liien;
Üüs Fuartirs Kempers wiili diar;
Ual’ Tialen weet üüs jit tö siien,
Wat ön forgingen Daagen wiar.
Üüs Fuarfaarn haa fuul hön’ert Jaaren
Jir pluuget en jaar Aarber dön,
En uun wiar-s, fiir aur See tö faaren;
Man Söl’ring bleev-s üp See en Lön’.

Chorus

Üüs Söl’ring Lön, dü best üüs helig;
Dü blefst üüs ain, dü best üüs Lek!
Gair-t aaft üp Warel’ uk forskelig,
Üüs Spraak en Wiis auriit wü ek.
Let altert, wan ön frügelk Stün’en
Wü fan üüs Ailön’ sii en sjung,
Üüs lööwi: Wü wel, truu forbün’en
Üüs Söl’ring frai döört Leewent gung!

Chorus

Translation:

Our Sylter Land, you are to us holy;
You are our own, you are our joy!
Your old ways, to them we hold steadfastly;
The Sylter tongue we shan't forget.
We are forever to you bound,
So long as on this Earth we live.
And those who to the Mainland moved,
For you they cannot help but yearn there.

Chorus:
Come rain,
Come sunshine,
Come sad or happy times,
To Sylt we cling
Eternally;
We remain true Sylterfolk!

The seawind sang sighing softly,
When I on Sylt as a child slept;
From the beach heard I the ceaseless roar,
As I by my mother's hand was led.
I still the places all remember,
That were to us children Heaven,
The fast-blooming meadow, by our house,
Our playground by the bushes on the dike.

Chorus

Our memories keep holding fast,
To what we have treasured all our lives:
Our town, where we to school were sent,
Our bosom, our heath, the way by the cliff,
Each path, where we as children ran,
Each trail, that through the fields led,
The burial mounds, where we bonfires lit:
It is all there still.

Chorus

The burial mounds proudly standing;
Our ancient warriors lie therein;
We shall tell our children this we know,
How in days gone things were.
Our forefathers have for many centuries
Plowed and toiled here,
And frequently, the high seas they fared;
Faithful to Sylt they remained at sea and on land.

Chorus

Our Sylter Land, you are to us holy;
You are our own, you are our joy!
Though go oft the world through changes may,
Our language and ways still we cling.
Let always, in jolly rounds
us of our Island talk and sing,
We promise: We will, remain forever bound
On our Sylt free through life shall we go!

Chorus

== See also ==
- Leew Eilun Feer
