= List auf Sylt =

Municipality in Germany

- Municipality
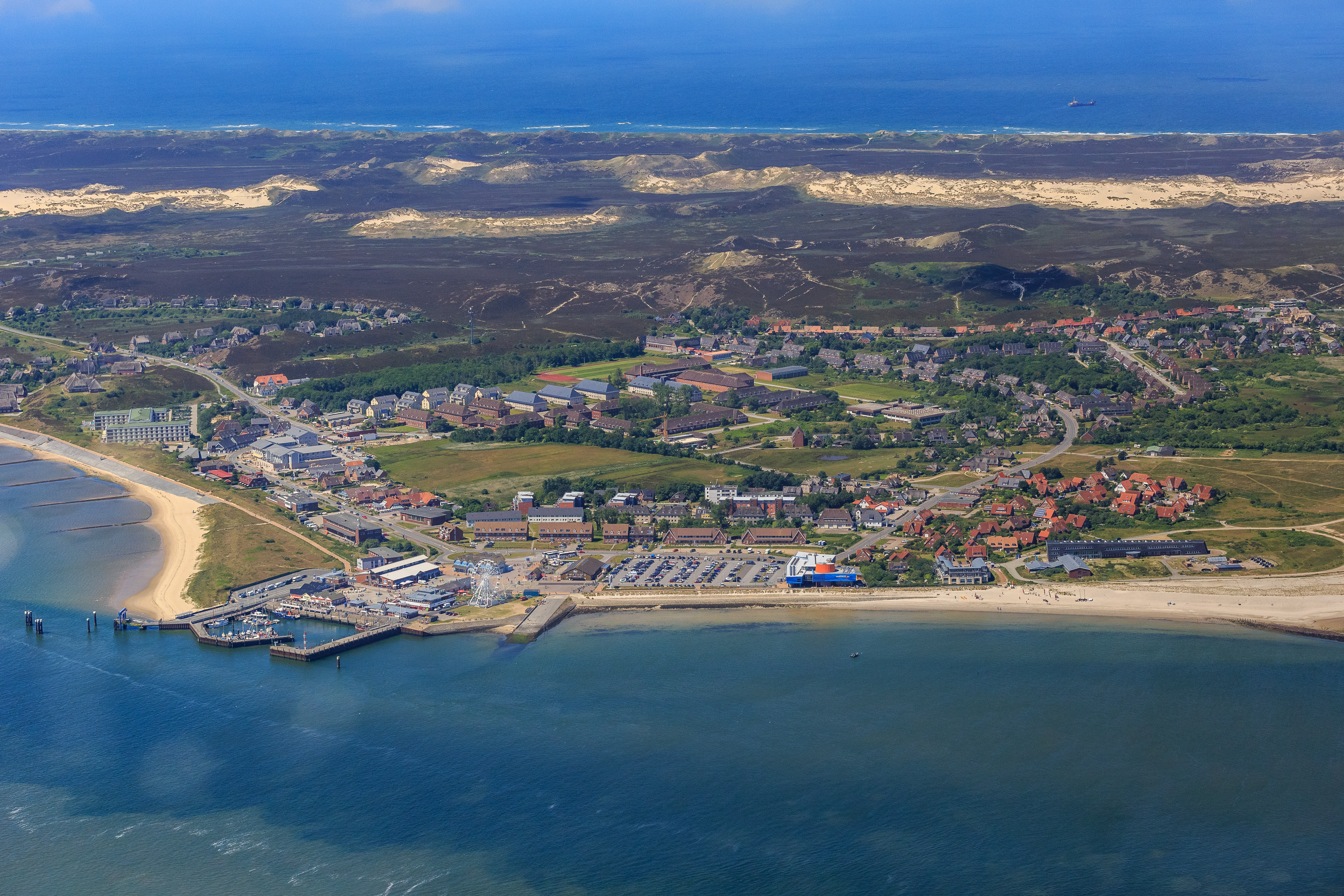

- Flag Coat of arms

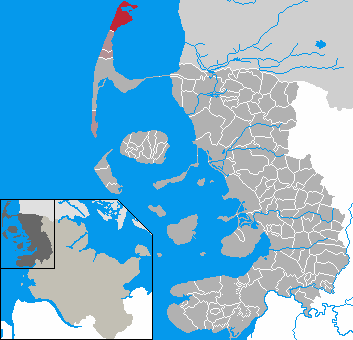
- Location of List auf Sylt within Nordfriesland district
- Interactive map of List auf Sylt
- Location within Germany Location within Schleswig-Holstein
- Coordinates: 55°0′N 8°26′E
- Country: Germany
- State: Schleswig-Holstein
- District: Nordfriesland
- Municipal assoc.: Landschaft Sylt

Government
  - Mayor: Wolfgang Strenger

Area
  - Total: 18.4 km^{2} (7.1 sq mi)
- Elevation: 3 m (9.8 ft)

Population (2025-12-31)
  - Total: 1,595
  - Density: 86.7/km^{2} (225/sq mi)
- Time zone: UTC+01:00 (CET)
  - Summer (DST): UTC+02:00 (CEST)
- Postal codes: 25992
- Dialling codes: 04651
- Vehicle registration: NF
- Website: www.amtlandschaftsylt.de

List auf Sylt (German pronunciation: [ˈlɪst ʔaʊf ˈzʏlt], lit. 'List on Sylt'; known as List until 31 December 2008; North Frisian: List üp Söl; Danish: List på Sild) is the northernmost municipality in Germany, located on the North Sea island of Sylt close to Denmark in the district of Nordfriesland in the state of Schleswig-Holstein.

== Etymology ==
List derived from the Middle Low German Liste (ledge, bar or edge).

== History ==
List was originally a Danish settlement. It was first mentioned in 1292 (Lystum). The original village was destroyed by the great flood of 1364. The settlement was rebuilt further east from the previous location. In the mid-15th century, a church named St. Jürgen was mentioned. In a treaty of 1460, Schleswig and Holstein were linked to the Danish crown, but List remained part of the royal enclaves, small areas of the Kingdom of Denmark situated within the Duchy of Schleswig, but directly controlled by the Danish king.

From the 16th century, the people of List mostly made a living from oyster farming, raising sheep and collecting and selling gull eggs. At the time, List was an important protective anchorage. In 1644, a Swedish-Dutch fleet of 26 ships commanded by Admiral Thijssen was attacked in the Lister Tief and defeated by Danish ships commanded by king Christian IV of Denmark. The anchorage north of today's town was named Königshafen to honour this event.

After the Danish-German war of 1864, List became part of Prussia. In 1908, List had 13 houses and 70 inhabitants.

The plebiscite of 1920 drew the border just north of List, with the next island (Rømø) being returned to Denmark.

In World War I, List became a naval air base. The first fortifications were constructed in 1914, followed by a hangar for naval planes. In 1927, a station of the Deutsche Verkehrsfliegerschule opened in List. This served both to train civilian pilots (for Lufthansa) as well as providing training for military purposes, officially forbidden by the Treaty of Versailles.

Much of today's town was built in the 1930s, when the Nazis expanded their military installations and added housing for military personnel. The current church of St. Jürgen was built. The population increased from 449 in 1933 to 3,000 by 1939, excluding military personnel.

After the end of World War II, the small town of List had to house around 2,000 displaced Germans, including 15 families from Heligoland, occupied by the British. The hangar was dismantled and transported to Kiel, where it became the Ostseehalle. In 1955, the Bundeswehr was established and the navy (Bundesmarine) returned to List.

More recently, the military presence was withdrawn from the area, shifting the focus of List's economy more and more towards the tourist industry. The Marineversorgungsschule closed at the end of 2006, ending the long period in which the military had been a major influence and the town's largest employer.

== Geography ==
List is the northernmost municipality of Germany, located at the northern part of the island of Sylt. The village is surrounded by dunes and heath, most of them protected nature reserves. To the north of List is the "Ellenbogen", a peninsula in the shape of an elbow (hence its name). To the west is the only shifting sand dune in Germany.

7/8ths of the area is private property owned by a group of 30 descendants of the original landowners, first mentioned in 1608.

== Climate ==
List on Sylt has an oceanic climate (Cfb in the Köppen climate classification).

Climate data for List on Sylt (1991–2020 normals, extremes 1937–present)
Month	Jan	Feb	Mar	Apr	May	Jun	Jul	Aug	Sep	Oct	Nov	Dec	Year
Record high °C (°F)	10.6 (51.1)	12.8 (55.0)	17.9 (64.2)	24.7 (76.5)	27.2 (81.0)	31.0 (87.8)	32.8 (91.0)	32.6 (90.7)	27.8 (82.0)	22.7 (72.9)	15.8 (60.4)	12.1 (53.8)	32.8 (91.0)
Mean daily maximum °C (°F)	4.1 (39.4)	4.0 (39.2)	6.5 (43.7)	11.2 (52.2)	15.1 (59.2)	17.9 (64.2)	20.4 (68.7)	20.7 (69.3)	17.5 (63.5)	12.9 (55.2)	8.3 (46.9)	5.5 (41.9)	12.0 (53.6)
Daily mean °C (°F)	2.5 (36.5)	2.3 (36.1)	4.0 (39.2)	7.8 (46.0)	11.6 (52.9)	14.7 (58.5)	17.2 (63.0)	17.6 (63.7)	14.8 (58.6)	10.7 (51.3)	6.6 (43.9)	3.8 (38.8)	9.5 (49.1)
Mean daily minimum °C (°F)	0.7 (33.3)	0.5 (32.9)	2.0 (35.6)	5.0 (41.0)	8.8 (47.8)	12.0 (53.6)	14.6 (58.3)	15.1 (59.2)	12.6 (54.7)	8.7 (47.7)	4.7 (40.5)	2.0 (35.6)	7.2 (45.0)
Record low °C (°F)	−21.2 (−6.2)	−21.0 (−5.8)	−15.0 (5.0)	−4.0 (24.8)	0.4 (32.7)	4.8 (40.6)	8.0 (46.4)	9.4 (48.9)	4.5 (40.1)	−1.2 (29.8)	−7.1 (19.2)	−13.6 (7.5)	−21.2 (−6.2)
Average precipitation mm (inches)	50.1 (1.97)	39.0 (1.54)	37.5 (1.48)	31.9 (1.26)	36.2 (1.43)	50.9 (2.00)	59.1 (2.33)	90.0 (3.54)	78.1 (3.07)	84.0 (3.31)	72.8 (2.87)	63.9 (2.52)	693.4 (27.30)
Average precipitation days (≥ 1.0 mm)	18.4	15.5	14.5	12.5	12.4	13.4	14.4	16.4	16.6	19.4	19.8	19.2	192.5
Average snowy days (≥ 1.0 cm)	5.0	4.7	2.0	0	0	0	0	0	0	0	0.4	2.4	14.5
Average relative humidity (%)	89.6	88.0	85.0	79.0	75.9	77.0	76.7	76.8	79.8	83.4	87.5	89.3	82.3
Mean monthly sunshine hours	50.7	75.3	137.3	199.4	252.1	232.0	238.4	215.6	154.5	104.2	53.3	42.7	1,755.6
Source 1: World Meteorological Organization
Source 2: DWD (extremes)

=== Subdivisions ===
List has the Ortsteile Klappholtal, Mellhörn, Möwenberg, Süderheidertal and Westerheide.

== Demographics ==
Out of roughly 2,700 inhabitants, only around 1,600 are permanent residents, the remainder being owners of holiday homes.

== Economy ==
The economy is dominated by tourism. List has been a designated Nordseebad since 1946. List is the location of the only commercial oyster farm in Germany.

== Attractions ==
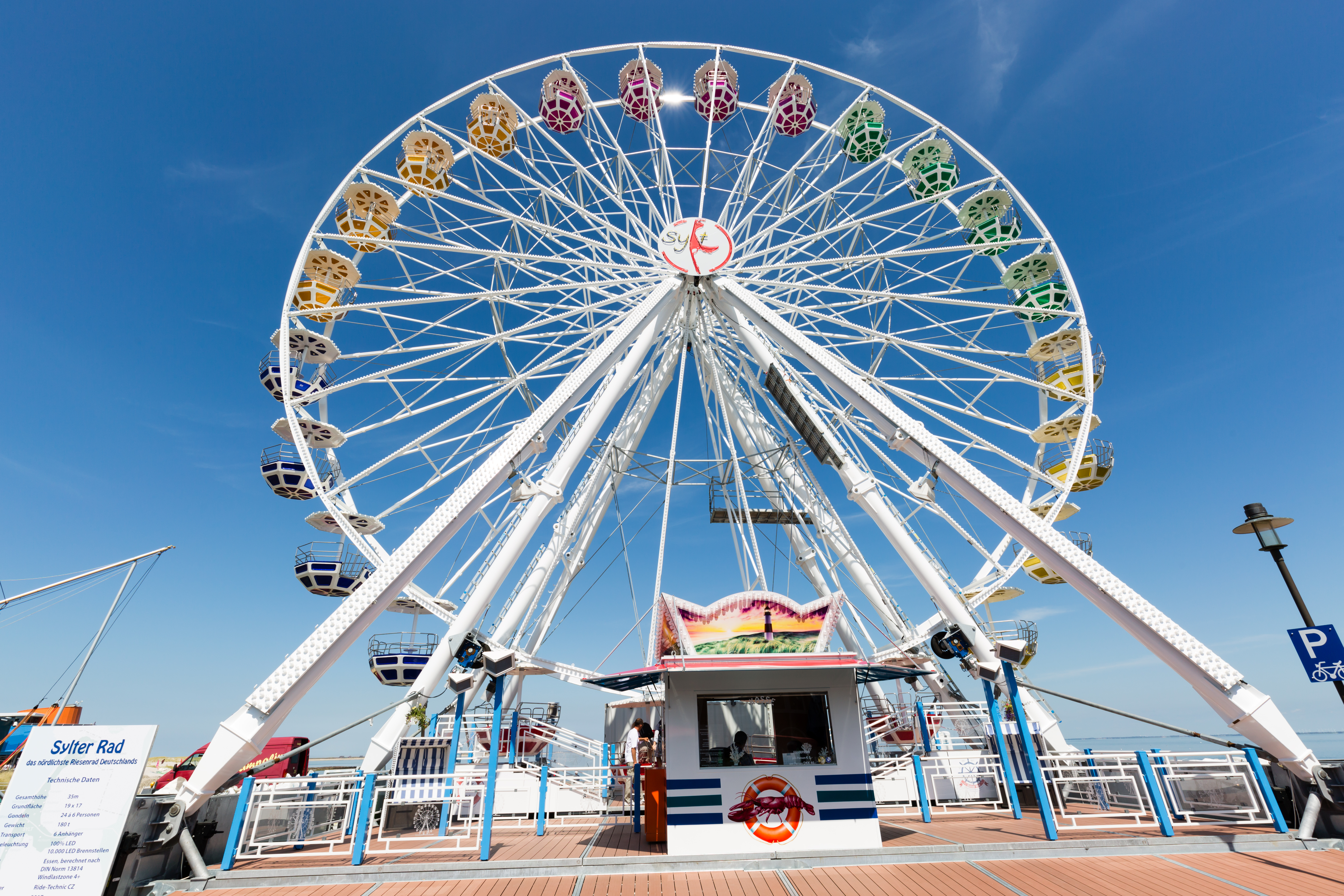
35 meter high Ferris wheel

The Erlebniszentrum Naturgewalten, opened in 2009, features an exhibit on the powers of sea, wind and sand that have shaped the island as well as on local flora and fauna.

In May 2017, a 35 meter high Ferris wheel was erected in the harbor for the 725th anniversary of the municipality of List.

== Government ==
Until 2004, List was amtsfrei but since then has been part of the Amt Landschaft Sylt, a collective administrative body. The Bürgermeister (mayor) of List is Wolfgang Strenger.

== Infrastructure ==
=== Transport ===
There is a ferry from List to the Danish island of Rømø, active since 1963. One single road leads south to the island's main town of Westerland.

List was connected to the rest of Sylt by the Sylter Nordbahn ( a narrow gauge railway) from 1908 to 1970, when it was discontinued.

There are two lighthouses in the area, List West and Leuchtturm List Ost. These are the two northernmost lighthouses in Germany.

== Education ==
List has two kindergartens: a German one, and a Danish one.

List hosts a facility of the Alfred Wegener Institute for Polar and Marine Research that studies the Wadden Sea.

== Notable people ==
- Wolfgang von Gronau circumnavigated the globe in a Dornier Do J in 1932, starting in List.
- Jürgen Gosch is the founder of a chain of restaurants that originated in List.
