= Cliffed coast =

Coast where waves have formed steep cliffs

Section through a cliffed coast

A cliffed coast, also called an abrasion coast, is a form of coast where the action of marine waves has formed steep cliffs that may or may not be precipitous. It contrasts with a flat or alluvial coast.

== Formation ==
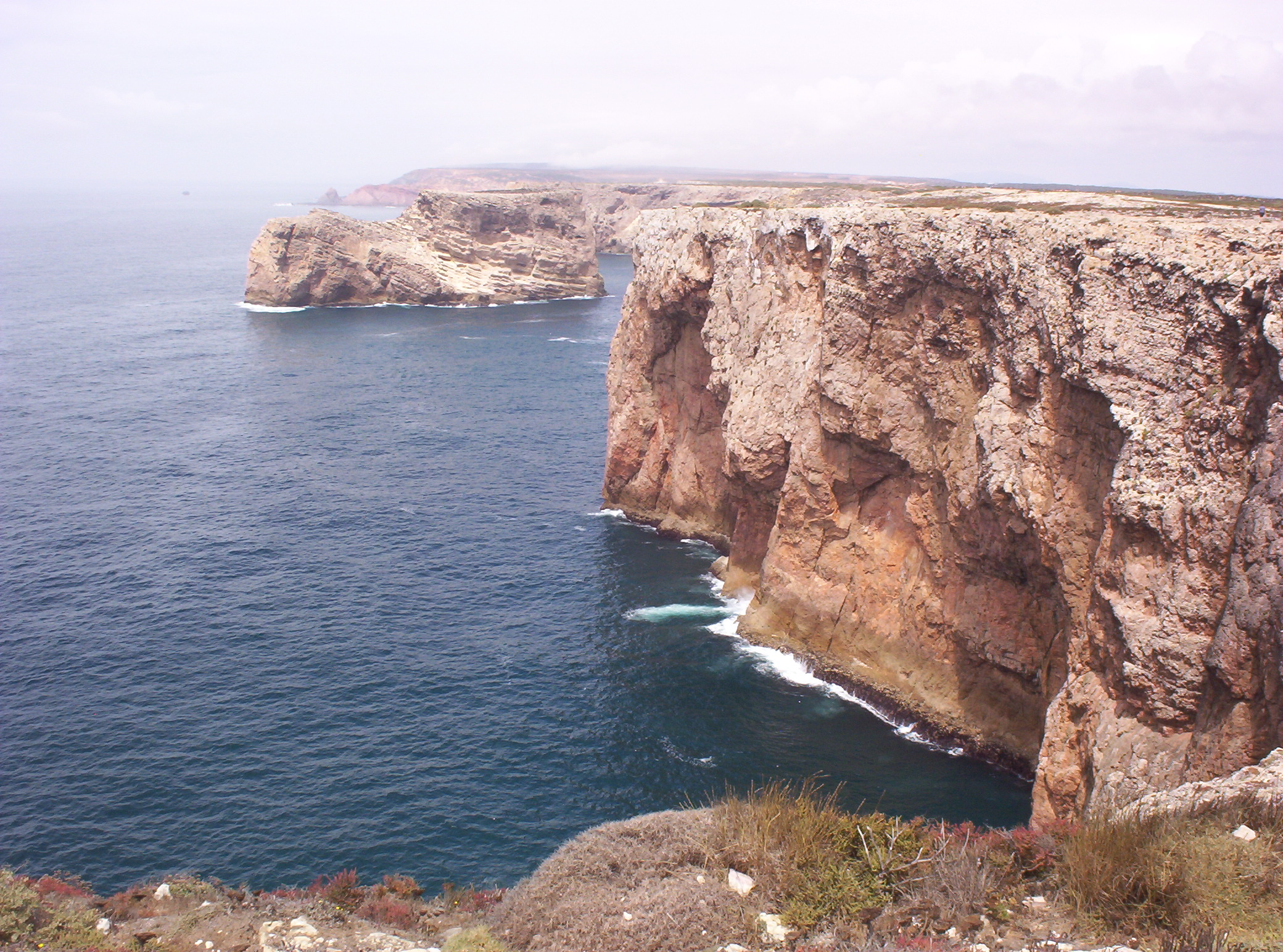
Crags on the southwestern coast of Portugal

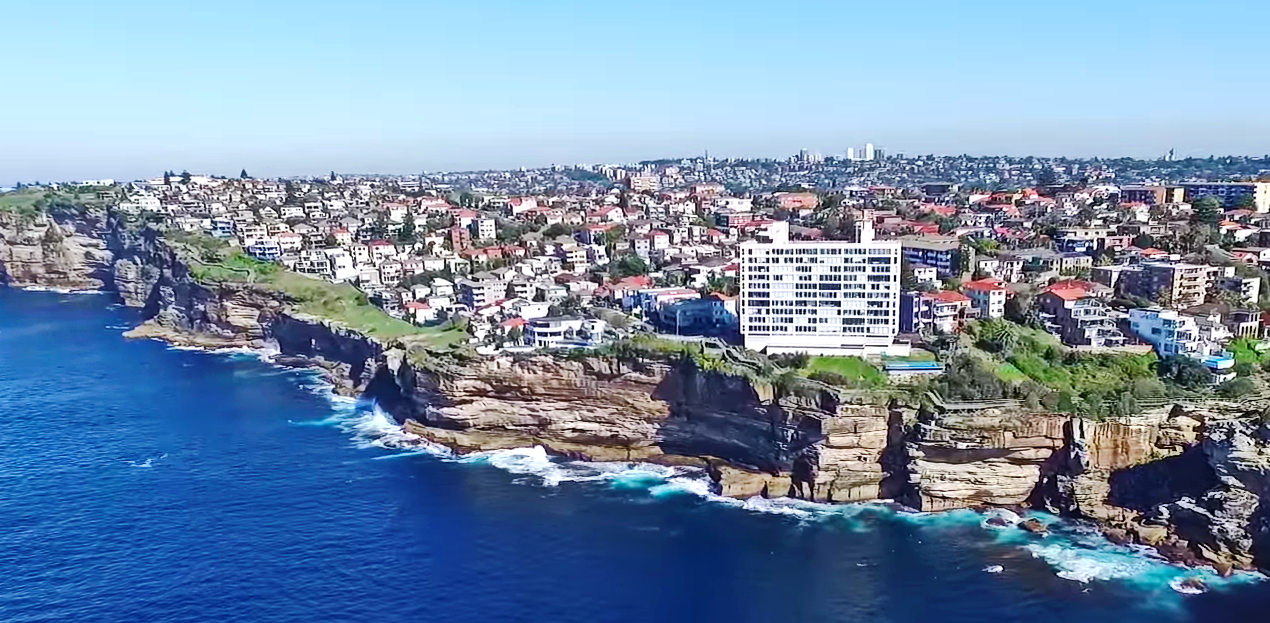
A cliffed coast in Sydney with houses and apartments

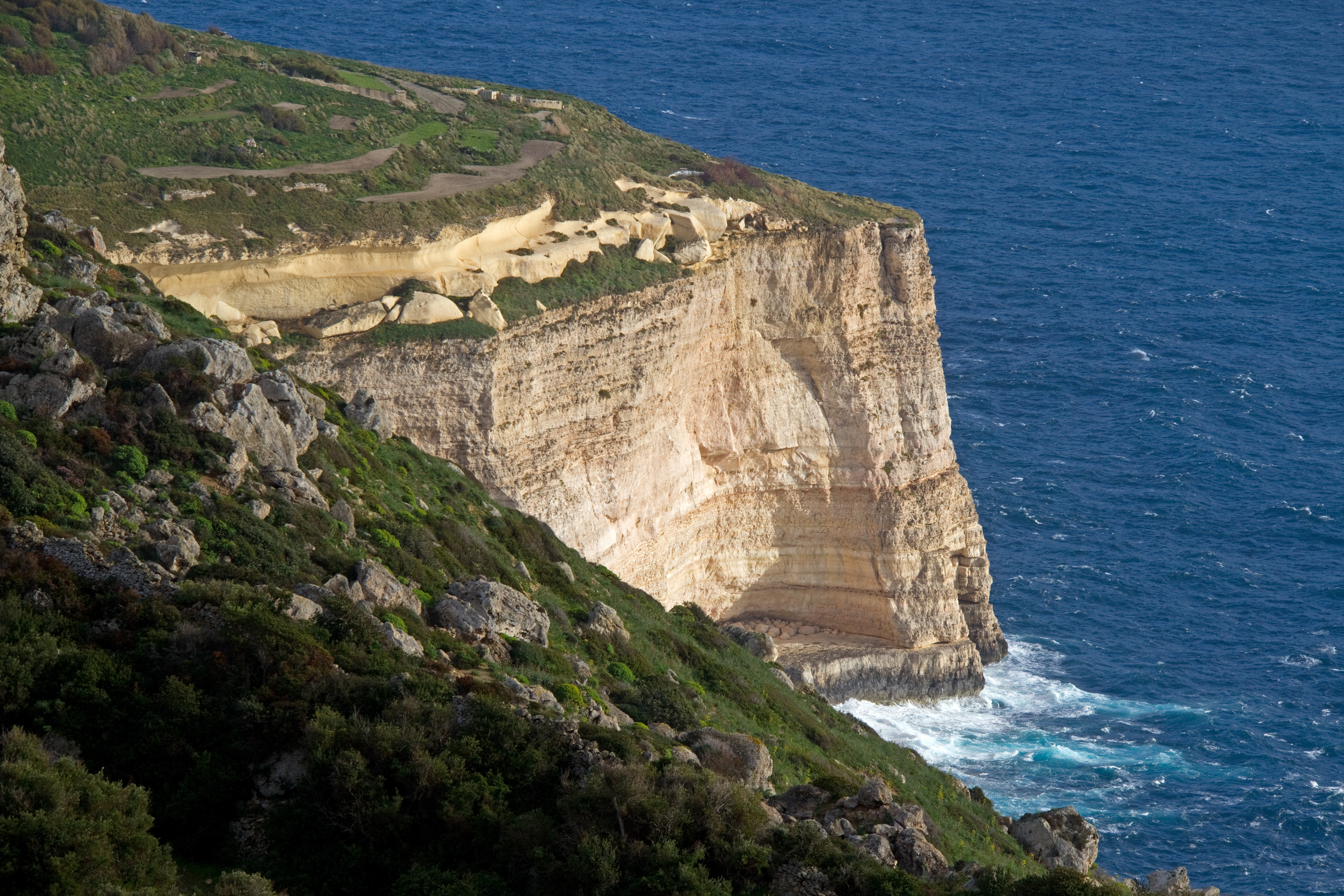
Dingli Cliffs in Malta

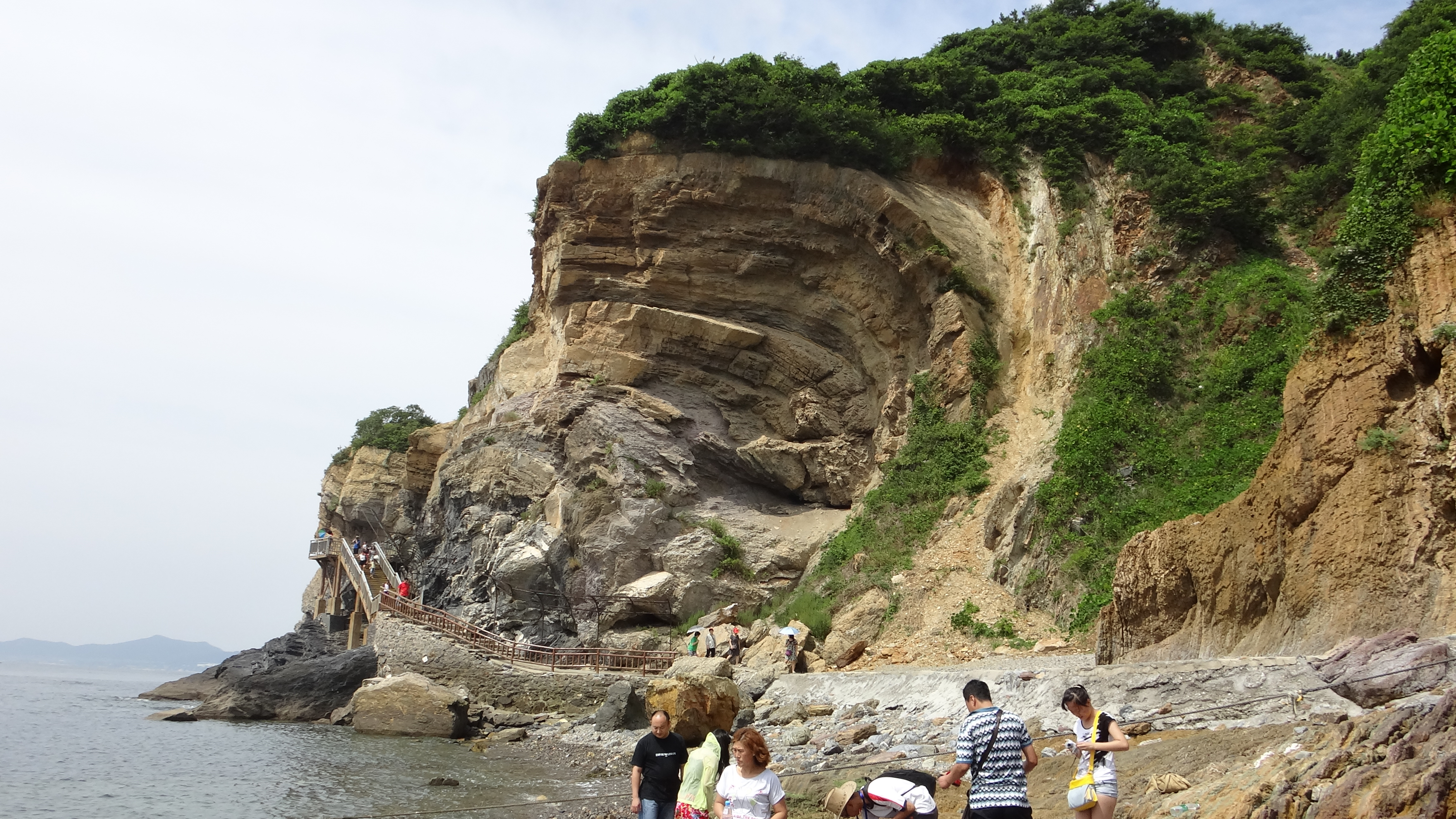
Abrasion cliff in Jinshitan Coastal National Geopark, Dalian, Liaoning Province, China. Wave-like texture was produced by coastal erosion.

In coastal areas in which the land surface dips at a relatively steep angle below the water table, the continuous action of marine waves on the coastline, known as abrasion, may create a steep declivity known as a cliff, the slope angle of which depends on a variety of factors including the jointing, bedding and hardness of the materials making up the cliff as well as the erosional processes themselves. The slope is constantly being eroded. The waves attacking the cliff-foot form a wave-cut notch by constant abrasion action producing an overhang. This overhang grows in size as the cliff is undercut, until it collapses under its own weight. The loose debris that has broken off is gradually carried away from the area in front of the cliff by the action of the sea. As the coastal cliffs collapse, the shoreline recedes inland. The speed at which this happens depends, in particular, on the strength of the surf, the height of the cliff, the frequency of storm surges and the hardness of the bedrock. Thus, the Mecklenburg coast in Germany recedes by about 25 centimetres per year, whereas the chalk cliffs of southern England retreat by just half a centimetre each year. A cliffed coast is made of a loose bedrock material, such as at the Red Cliff on the German island of Sylt, but can also occur in hard rock like the red sandstone cliffs on Heligoland. There are, however, differences between the former and the latter regarding some peculiarities of the coast line.

In the case of the large and widespread coastal cliffs of Atacama Desert the modern cliffs originated from a process of scarp retreat of a fault scarp, thus at present the cliffs do not follow any geological fault.

=== Rocky cliffed coast ===
On a rocky cliffed coast made up of material which is relatively resistant to erosion such as sandstone, limestone or granite, a flat rocky wave-cut platform or abrasion platform is formed in front of the cliff. It represents the foot of the cliff preserved at and below the level of water table. If there is a tectonic uplift of the coast, these abrasion platforms can be raised to form coastal terraces, from which the amount of uplift can be calculated from their elevation relative to the sea level, taking into account any eustatic sea level changes. On a cliffed coast made up of material which is only fairly or even hardly resistant to erosion no wave-cut platform but a beach is formed in front of the sea cliff.

If waves carve notches at a narrow point on both sides of a promontory on the rocky cliffed coast, a natural arch may be formed. When the arch collapses as the coastline recedes further a stack is left behind on the wave-cut platform. The best-known example in Germany is the Lange Anna on Heligoland, while, in England, a prominent example are Old Harry Rocks in Dorset.

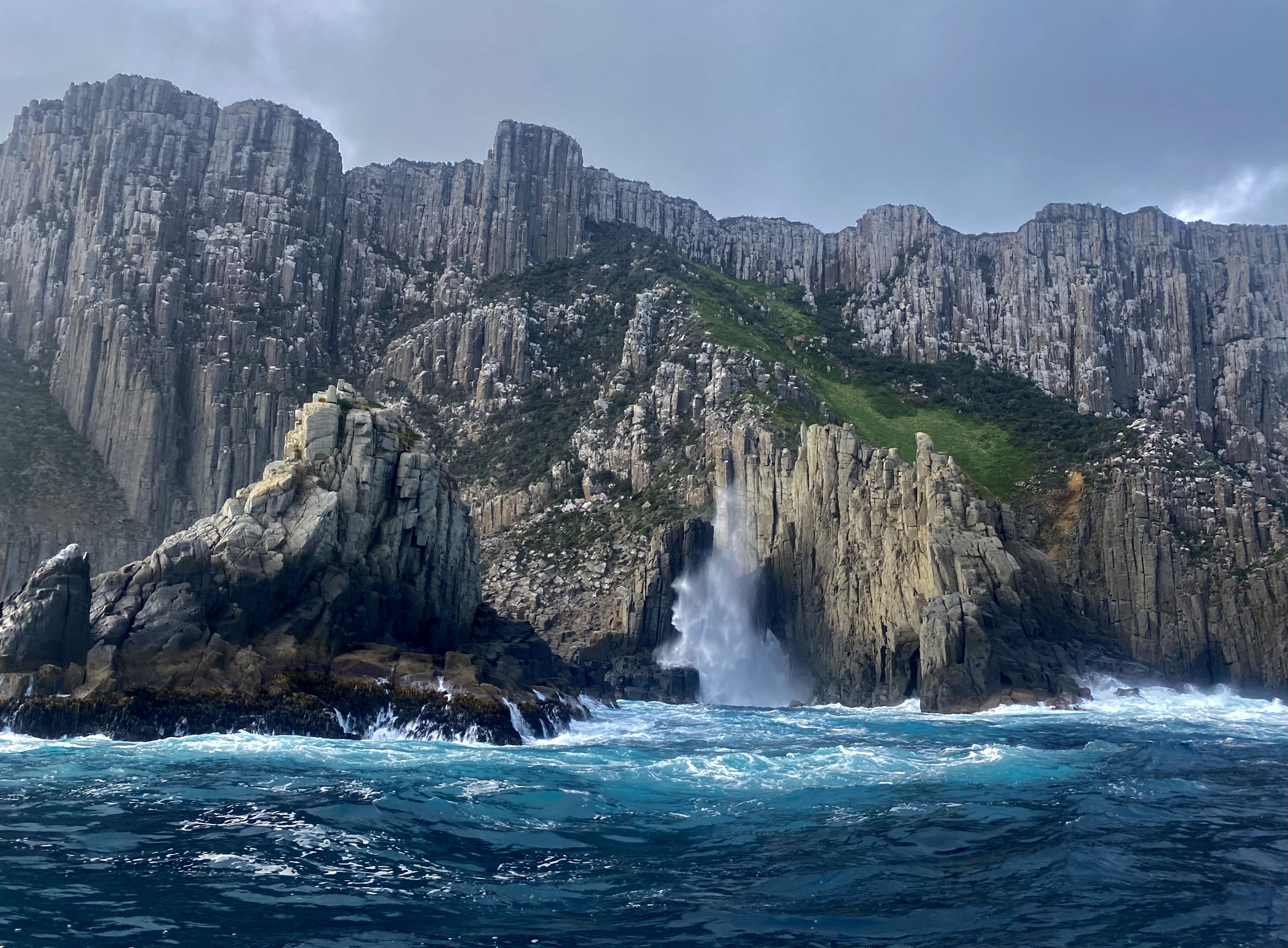
Ocean waves crashing against sea cliffs at Cape Pillar, Tasmania in Australia.

Furthermore, on a rocky cliffed coast wave action is not the only driving force for coastline retreat. General weathering of the bedrock is almost equally important.

== Living and dead cliffs ==
"Living cliffs" are those on a coast that is still active, i.e. that is being eroded and is receding. A "dead cliff", by contrast, is only reached by very high marine waves and is therefore subjected to very little change. A clear indication of a lack of activity at a dead cliff is a covering of vegetation that appears on the cliff as wave action against it subsides.

Well-known coasts with living cliffs in Germany are the Red Cliff (Rote Kliff) in Kampen on the island of Sylt or the chalk cliffs on the Jasmund Peninsula. The Königsstuhl on the island of Rügen is a good example of a dead cliff. Others may be found in the regions of the present-day Wadden Sea coast of the North Sea a few kilometres inland. These show the former coastline from which the sea retreated as the level of water in the North Sea fell.

== Other processes ==
Steep sea cliffs can also be caused by catastrophic debris avalanches. These have been common on the submerged flanks of ocean island volcanos such as the Hawaiian Islands and the Cape Verde Islands.
