= Rotes Kliff Lighthouse =

Lighthouse in Schleswig-Holstein, Germany

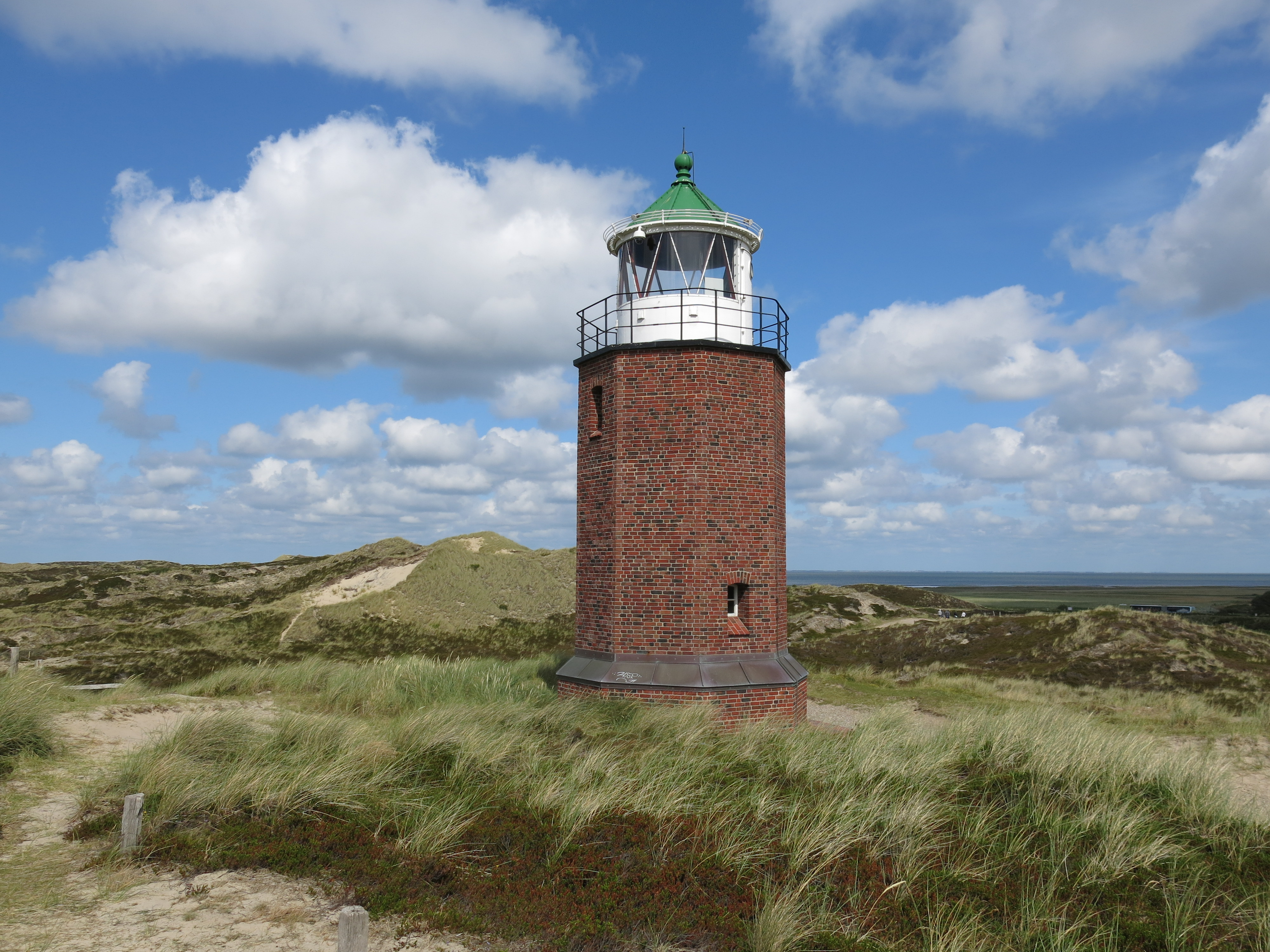
- Location: Sylt, Germany
- Coordinates: 54.965662°N 8.337812°E

Tower
- Constructed: 1913
- Construction: brick tower
- Height: 13 metres (43 ft)
- Shape: octagonal tower with balcony and cylindrical lantern
- Markings: unpainted brick tower, white lantern, green copper roof
- Operator: Municipality of Kampen
- Heritage: Heritage monument in Schleswig-Holstein

Light
- First lit: 1913
- Deactivated: 1975
- Focal height: 23 metres (75 ft)
- Range: 21 nautical miles (39 km; 24 mi)
- Characteristic: F WRG 6s

The Rotes Kliff Lighthouse on the island of Sylt, Germany, served as a sector light from 1913 to 1975. It is located on a cliffside north of the village of Kampen.

== History ==
The lighthouse was built between 1912 and 1913 as a sector light to warn ships of a sand bank in the approach to the Lister Tief nautical channel and to have a supplement to the main light at Kampen, 2.5 kilometres to the south. It became operational in 1913 and was electrified in 1936. Until its deactivation in 1975 it was maintained by the keepers of the Kampen lighthouse. When Rotes Kliff was extinguished, the main light at Kampen took over its part with a red section of light. Today the tower serves as a daymark without any lighting facility and is owned by the Kampen municipality who financed a restoration of the tower in 1993.

== See also ==
- List of lighthouses and lightvessels in Germany
