= Landschaft Sylt =

- Amt
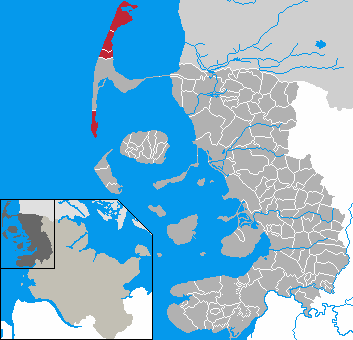
- Map of Nordfriesland highlighting Landschaft Sylt
- Interactive map of Landschaft Sylt
- Location within Germany Location within Schleswig-Holstein
- Coordinates: 54°57′N 8°20′E
- Country: Germany
- State: Schleswig-Holstein
- District: Nordfriesland
- Seat: Westerland
- Subdivisions: 4 municipalities

Government
  - Mayor: Ronald Benck

Area
  - Total: 38.65 km^{2} (14.92 sq mi)

Population (2025-12-31)
  - Total: 4,312
  - Density: 111.6/km^{2} (289.0/sq mi)
- Time zone: UTC+01:00 (CET)
  - Summer (DST): UTC+02:00 (CEST)
- Website: amtlandschaftsylt.de

Landschaft Sylt is an Amt ("collective municipality") in the district of Nordfriesland, in Schleswig-Holstein, Germany. It covers the island of Sylt (except the independent municipality Sylt in the center of the island), in the North Sea, about 65 km northwest of Husum. Its administrative seat is in the town Westerland - which is not, however, a part of the Amt.

The total number of inhabitants, about 4,500, is less than the minimum requirement for an independently administrated Amt (8,000 inhabitants). The administration of the Amt is thus shared with the Gemeinde Sylt. Since 2009, the seat of the Amt has been located in the townhall of the Gemeinde Sylt in Westerland.

== Subdivision ==
The Amt Landschaft Sylt consists of the following municipalities:

1. Hörnum
2. Kampen
3. List
4. Wenningstedt-Braderup
