= Hörnum =

Hörnum Hörnem / Hørnum
- Municipality
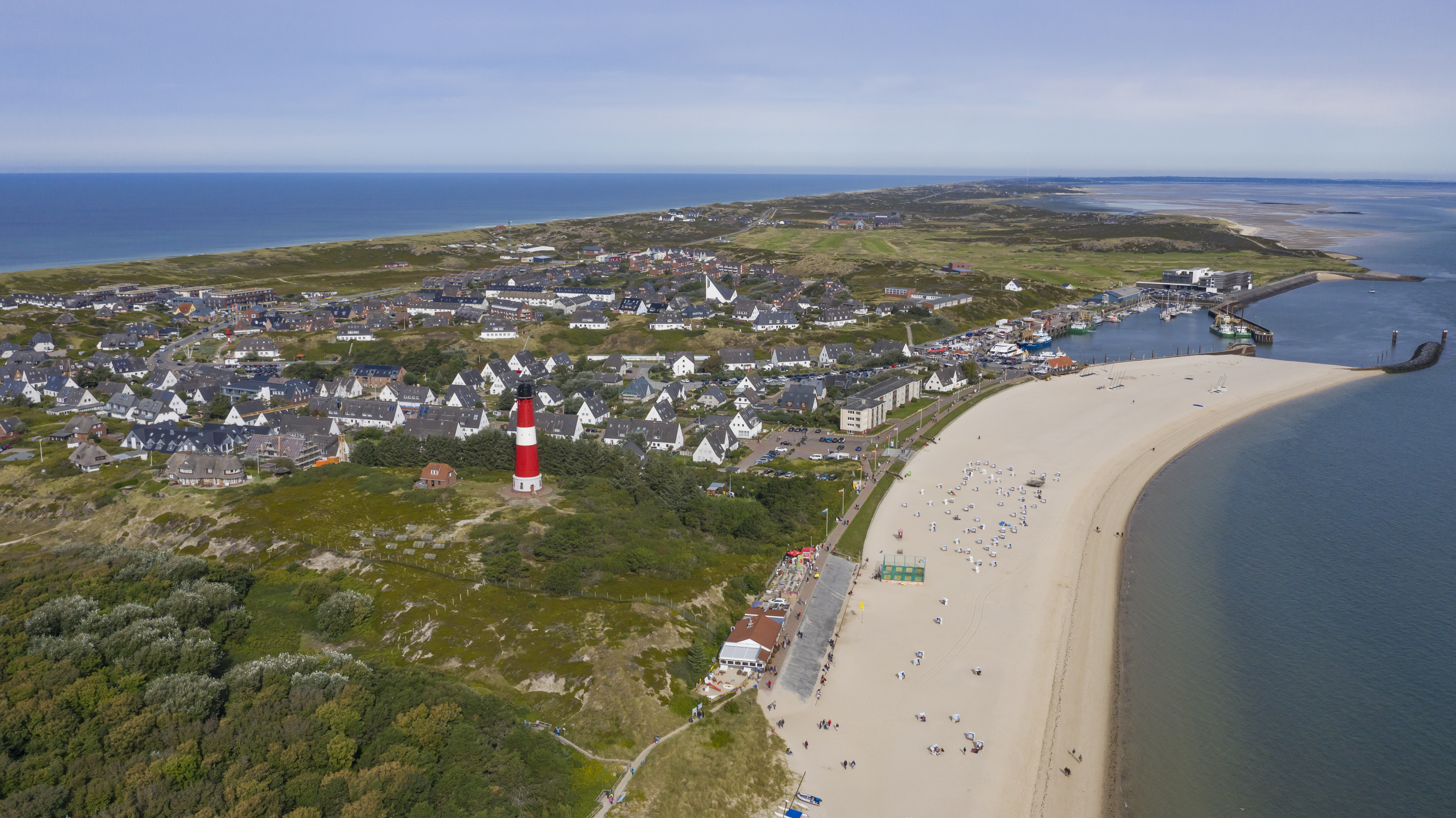

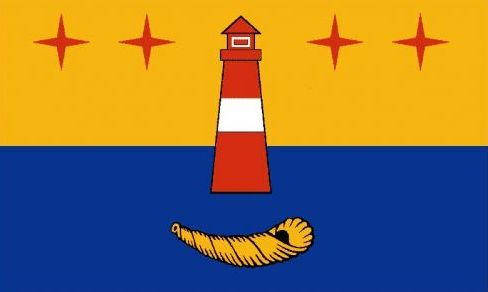
- Flag Coat of arms

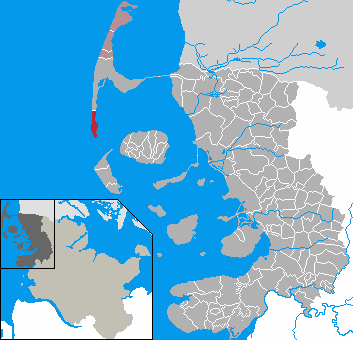
- Location of Hörnum within Nordfriesland district
- Interactive map of Hörnum
- Location within Germany Location within Schleswig-Holstein
- Coordinates: 54°45′27″N 8°17′15″E
- Country: Germany
- State: Schleswig-Holstein
- District: Nordfriesland
- Municipal assoc.: Landschaft Sylt

Government
  - Mayor: Rolf Speth

Area
  - Total: 5.64 km^{2} (2.18 sq mi)
- Elevation: 4 m (13 ft)

Population (2025-12-31)
  - Total: 830
  - Density: 150/km^{2} (380/sq mi)
- Time zone: UTC+01:00 (CET)
  - Summer (DST): UTC+02:00 (CEST)
- Postal codes: 25997
- Dialling codes: 0465122
- Vehicle registration: NF

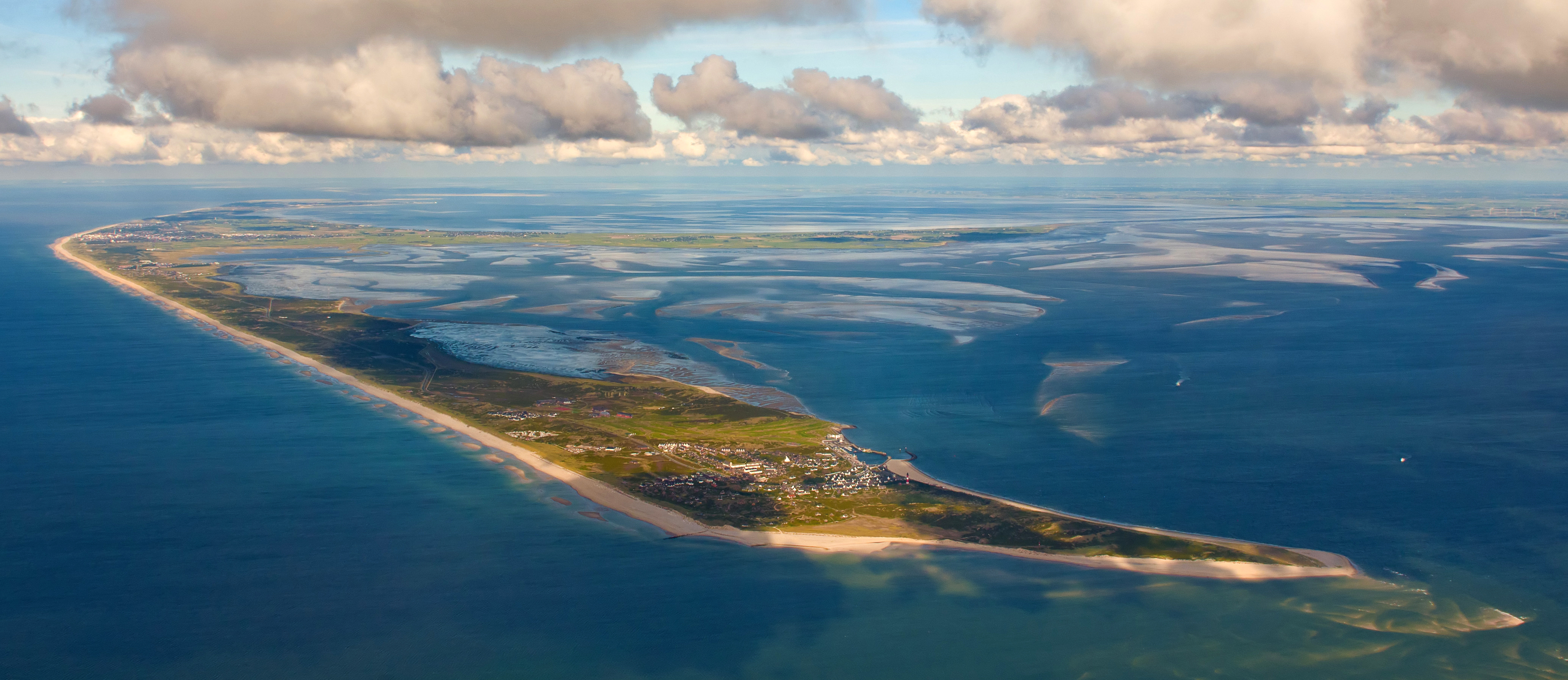
Hörnum

Hörnum (German pronunciation: [ˈhœʁnʊm]; officially Hörnum (Sylt); Sölring Frisian: Hörnem; Danish: Hørnum) is a municipality in the district of Nordfriesland, in Schleswig-Holstein, Germany. It is located on the southern headland of the island of Sylt. The municipality is part of the Amt Landschaft Sylt. The economy is dominated by tourism.

== Etymology ==
Hörnum's name is derived from Hörn ("corner" or "edge").

== Geography ==
Hörnum is located on the southern tip of Sylt. Most of the municipal territory is covered by nature reserves (mostly dunes and heath). The Hörnum Odde is the southernmost point of the island and subject to constant erosion by wind and sea.

== History ==
=== First settlements ===
Although fishermen had reportedly settled in the area prior to 1500 AD, the place is first recorded in 1649 as Hornum. The name "Hörnum" was already known to the chronicler Muchel-Madis (* 11 November 1572 in Morsum; † 21 January 1651), who in his chronicles reports a shipwrecking "1571... off Hörnum". In 1648, the area was named "Hörnum" on a map by cartographer Johannes Mejer (1606–1674). The southern tip of the island remained unsettled though for a long time, because not only storm surges but also shifting dunes, which would repeatedly bury houses, made a colonisation difficult. Only in the late 18th century, this effect could be stopped by planting vegetation on the dunes. "On Hörnum", as the entire southern peninsula of Sylt used to be called, there were at first only a few fishermen. A single house stood in the dunes at Budersand from 1765 to 1785. It served for storing flotsam, but was soon torn down by people from Amrum and Rantum. In 1787, only the foundations were left.

=== Post-1900 ===
There were no buildings in the area until the construction of a Hamburg America Line (HAPAG) pier. Long since, Hörnum had had a natural harbour east of Budersand, which remained largely unnoticed though. Only after a wooden wharf had been constructed, a regular ship line to Hamburg via Cuxhaven took up operations on 29 June 1901. Moreover, a seaside resort line Hörnum-Heligoland-Hamburg became active.

In 1901, the area (still part of Rantum at the time) was connected by the Sylter Inselbahn to Westerland. Up to that point the heath around the harbour was devoid of any buildings. The first local structure was the railway station built in 1903, followed by the HAPAG building. Only in 1905 were the first residential buildings erected.

Most of the initial growth of the village was driven by military construction. The core of today's Hörnum is the Weiße Siedlung (White Housing Estate) around Strandstraße, Hafenstraße and Blankes Tälchen, built by the military starting in 1920. In 1936, construction started on the Rote Siedlung (Red Housing Estate; Steintal, Budersandstraße, Hangstraße) and like the Weiße Siedlung served as housing for the local population, all of whom were employed at the local Fliegerhorst (airbase), built after 1935, or other military installations. There were almost no civilian buildings at the time.

Until the island was connected to the mainland by the construction of the Hindenburg causeway in 1927, the port of Hörnum and the local rail line were the main way for visitors to get on the island. Around 90% of the tourists would use Hörnum as their port of call.

In 1906, the Hörnum water tower was built; after the connection of Hörnum to the island's common water supply it became superfluous and was demolished in 1967.

In 1907, Hörnum got a 33.5 metres tall lighthouse, which was built based on a standardised design. Other such constructions were erected on the island of Pellworm and at Westerhever. From 1918 to 1930, the lighthouse was also used as a school house. Lessons took place at an elevation of 30 meters. At the end of World War I, Hörnum counted 21 inhabitants who were administrated by Rantum. In both World Wars, Hörnum was deemed a strategically important location which needed special defense.

=== Military importance during the World Wars ===
The first barracks were built in 1914 for troops of the so-called "Island Guard". At the beginning of World War I, island guards were stationed on Amrum, Sylt and Rømø (today in Denmark), who used light signals to communicate. From the List "Elbow" peninsula in the north to Hörnum in the south, bunkers and shelters were dug into the dunes of Sylt and wired with telephone lines. Mostly elderly, local soldiers were tasked with searching the horizon for hostile troops, but the island did not witness any combat.

During World War II, troops were deployed to the village. The port was mainly used by the Kriegsmarine and a small air field for minor planes had been constructed in the mid-1930s. After 1935, the Luftwaffe had built a naval air station and the "Hörnum Military Settlement (Militärische Siedlung Hörnum)" as a preparation for the war. The outbreak of war prevented the project from being finished and so the gaps in the colony, which was designed as a garden city, have since been filled with post-war buildings. The number of inhabitants in Hörnum exploded due to the opening of the naval air station and the adjacent quarters and rose above 1,000 when the troops brought their families to the island. Shortly after, electricity was available from a local power station, and in 1941 Hörnum was connected to Westerland's water supply.

Hörnum's seaplane base was the location of the first bombs dropped on German soil during the Second World War, on the night of 19 March 1940 during a raid by No 61 Squadron RAF's Handley Page Hampdens based at RAF Hemswell in Lincolnshire, England.

=== Post-War era ===
In 1947, Hörnum split from the neighbouring municipality of Rantum and became independent. Only two years later, the village was awarded the title Nordseebad (North Sea resort). An influx of tourists and "New Hörnumers" set in. In 1947, the village briefly provided shelter for more than 2,000 refugees from Germany's former eastern territories and also 40 families from Heligoland dwelt there after the evacuation of their island (occupied by the United Kingdom).

In 1948, a wooden hut was erected with donations from Norway and consecrated as a church. It was named St. Martin. When St. Thomas' church was built in 1970, the St. Martin building shortly served as a kindergarten and a storage for Strandkorb beach chairs. Since 1974, this so-called Norwegian House is seat of the Wadden Sea Conservation Station (Schutzstation Wattenmeer), an environmental protection society, and since 1989 also serves as a youth club. In 1985, the hut was named after the Hörnum teacher and environmentalist Kuno Ehlfeldt.

Also in 1948, Hörnum was connected to the island's road network. The original concrete slabs track consisted of a single lane and was broadened in 1969.

In 1960, the Kersiegsiedlung colony, known for its thatched roofs, was built in the dunes. The Catholic St. Joseph's church followed in 1962, and in 1969/1970 the Evangelical St. Thomas' church was built according to a design by Niebüll-based architect Martin-Bernhard Christiansen. The latter building constitutes Schleswig-Holstein's youngest historically preserved church. It is built in the shape of a white sail. Another notability is the ex-voto ship which hangs inside the church house — a scale model of the paddlesteamer "Cobra", a Hamburg America Line ship, which from 1901 on contributed greatly to the exploration and development of the Hörnum area.

In 1970, the railway service was discontinued and the track later demolished. It is now used as a bicycle track.

=== Tourism development since the 1970s ===
In the mid-1970s a spa and therapy centre was built and opened in 1977.

In 1994, the Pidder Lüng Barracks, which had replaced the former naval station, were closed. After the demolition of all buildings on the site, a golf course with an adjacent luxury hotel was built there.

In 2002, the Hörnum harbour was slightly renovated. The Hörnum Yacht Club was created and a new ticket vending facility for Adler shippings was opened. Later, several neighbourhoods in Hörnum were also renovated.

In 1999, the old therapy centre was closed as it did not provide modern standards for cures any more and was in deficit. It was replaced by a hotel.

== Economy ==
=== Tourism ===
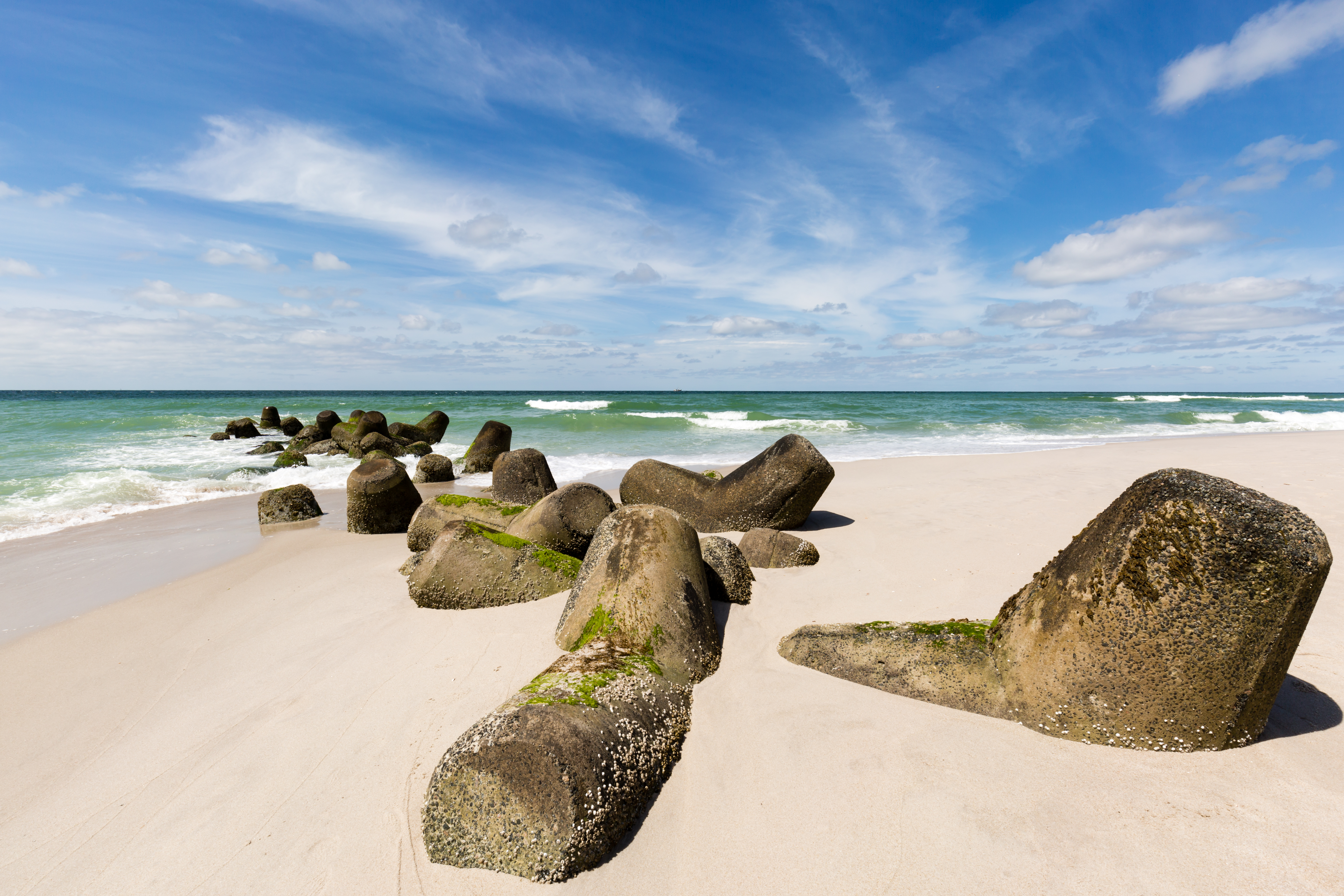
Tetrapods on the beach

Hörnum's original function as a military town has been completely replaced by tourism as the main means of income. The beaches east and west of the village, the port and the dunes provide the village's assets. A popular route for mudflat hiking leads along the eastern shore to Rantum. The Schutzstation Wattenmeer offers information on the Wadden Sea and the salt marshes and promotes the protection of the local landscape among tourists. Another attraction is hiking around the Hörnum-Odde, the island's southernmost edge, which due to erosion is constantly shrinking. In the storm Erwin in winter 2005 alone, the Hörnum-Odde lost 20 metres of land. From this southern headland, the neighbouring islands of Föhr and Amrum are visible.

== Government ==
The current Bürgermeister (mayor) is Rolf Speth.

=== Arms ===
Blazon: Or, a lighthouse gules with a band argent, emitting rays of four-pointed mullets gules. A base azure, therein a conch horn or.
