= Wenningstedt-Braderup =

Wenningstedt-Braderup Woningstair-Brääderep / Venningsted-Brarup
- Municipality
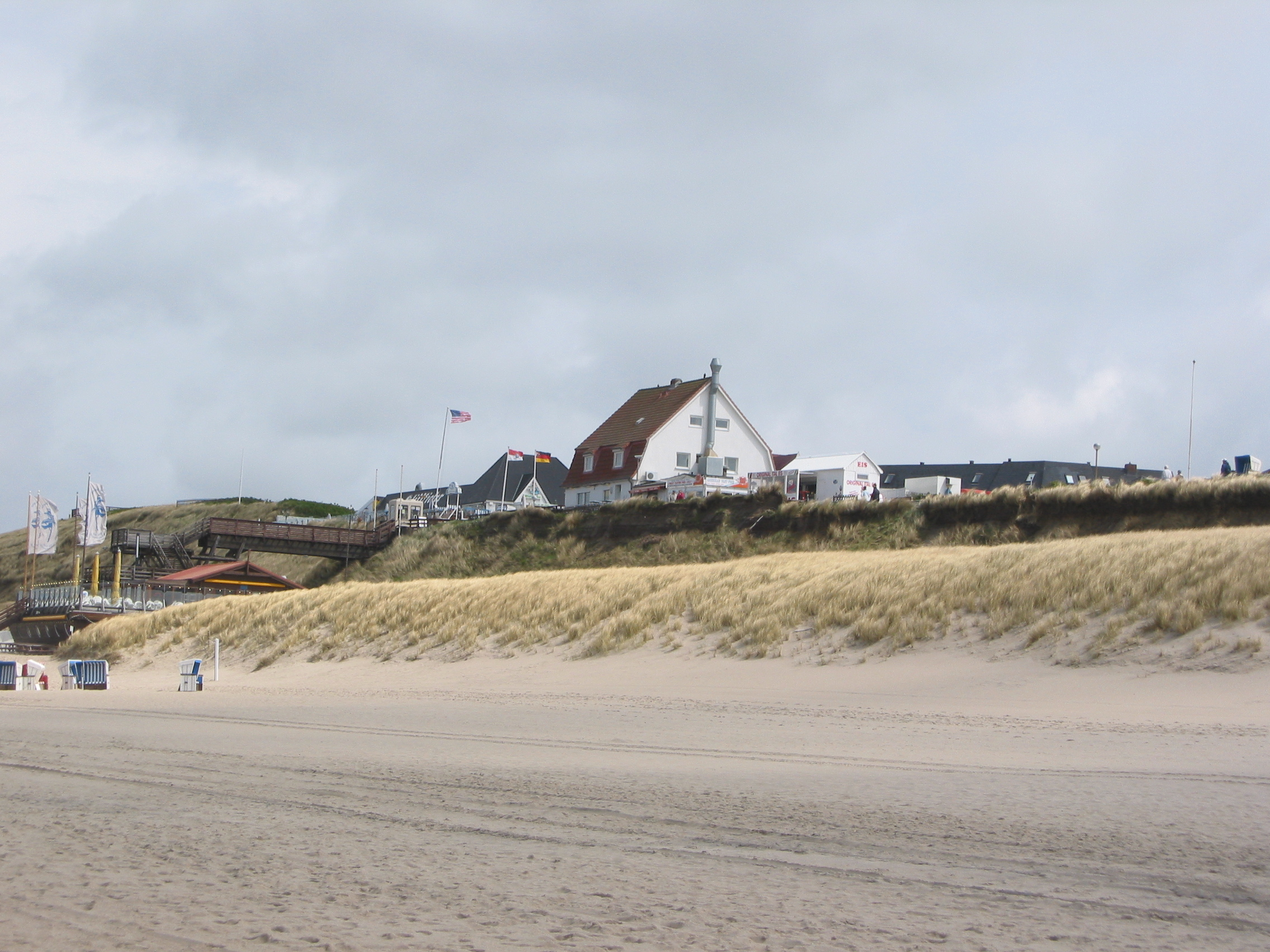

- Flag Coat of arms

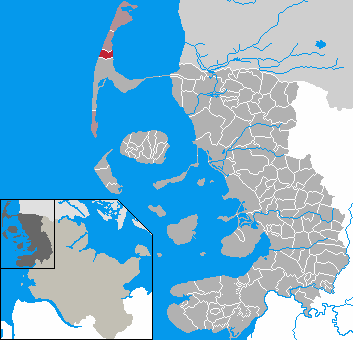
- Location of Wenningstedt-Braderup; Woningstair-Brääderep / Venningsted-Brarup within Nordfriesland district
- Interactive map of Wenningstedt-Braderup; Woningstair-Brääderep / Venningsted-Brarup
- Location within Germany Location within Schleswig-Holstein
- Coordinates: 54°55′N 8°19′E
- Country: Germany
- State: Schleswig-Holstein
- District: Nordfriesland
- Municipal assoc.: Landschaft Sylt

Government
  - Mayor: Katrin Fifeik

Area
  - Total: 6.16 km^{2} (2.38 sq mi)
- Elevation: 18 m (59 ft)

Population (2025-12-31)
  - Total: 1,398
  - Density: 227/km^{2} (588/sq mi)
- Time zone: UTC+01:00 (CET)
  - Summer (DST): UTC+02:00 (CEST)
- Postal codes: 25996
- Dialling codes: 0 46 51
- Vehicle registration: NF
- Website: www.wenningstedt.de

Wenningstedt-Braderup (German pronunciation: [ˈvɛnɪŋʃtɛt ˈbʁaːdəʁʊp]; officially Wenningstedt-Braderup (Sylt); North Frisian: Woningstair-Brēderep; Danish: Venningsted-Brarup) is a municipality and seaside resort on the island of Sylt in the district of Nordfriesland, in Schleswig-Holstein, Germany. It is located north of the town of Westerland and is part of the Amt Landschaft Sylt. The local economy is dominated by tourism.

== Etymology ==
The name Wenningstedt likely means '"homestead of the people of Winni". Braderup probably means "village on the slope".

== History ==
Tradition holds that in the 5th and 6th century the Angles and Saxons led by Hengist and Horsa sailed from here to conquer England. Reportedly, their raiding party set sail from a harbour in Frisia called Wynningstede. However, this is unproven and even if true, due to coastal erosion, the place they could have sailed from is now located more than 2 kilometres west of the current beach, in the North Sea.

According to another tradition, a few hundred metres off today's shoreline there was the ancient settlement of Wendingstedt with an old Frisian port at the west coast. This supposedly was home to 200 fishing boats and was destroyed by a storm in 1300 AD. It is disputed though among scientists if this village ever existed or if it is merely a legend.

The first definitive mention of Wenningstedt occurs in 1462.

Braderup by contrast is one of the youngest settlements on the geest of Sylt. It is first mentioned in a document in 1540.

Until the early 19th century, Wenningstedt remained almost unchanged for centuries, consisting of merely eight farmsteads. The inhabitants lived on agriculture and fishing. Not a few men would also go whaling in the Arctic Sea or sailed on Hamburg ships to catch herring.

Since 1859, Wenningstedt has been a seaside resort, since 1960 it has been a recognised seaside spa (Nordseebad). In 1830, Braderup still had more inhabitants than Wenningstedt. Only by the beginning of the 20th century did the latter start to grow faster, boosted by tourism, and the number of inhabitants initially surpassed Braderup only slightly.

Together with Kampen and Braderup, Wenningstedt was part of the so-called Northern Villages (Norddörfer) - an early municipal association on the island. The term was coined when List, the northernmost village on the island, was part of the Danish realm. Thus Wenningstedt, Braderup and Kampen were the German "Northernmost Villages". This administrative cooperation ended in 1927 when Kampen and Wenninhgstedt became two separate communities, with Braderup becoming part of Wenningstedt.

In 1903, the Sylter Inselbahn (island railway) connected Wenningstedt to Westerland in the south and from 1908 to List in the north. The railway was abolished in 1970.

In 1914, a Protestant chapel was built at the village pond.

During World War II a heavy coastal artillery battery was deployed in the dunes northwest of Wenningstedt. There was however no combat action; the facilities were blown up in the late 1940s by the Royal Air Force stationed at Westerland and were later completely dismantled and covered with sand by German combat engineers.

=== Architecture and village development ===
Until the mid 19th century, Wenningstedt was dominated by farmsteads in the Uthland Frisian style. The village centre was located by the pond, Kiar. With the rise of tourism, numerous small guest houses but also villas were built for summer tourists. Until then, there had been no regular road network in the village, but due to tourist development new streets and neighbourhoods were planned on the drawing board. As the guest houses more and more avoided the old village core, the new centre gradually migrated to the west, towards the beach. The new style was now leaning towards fashionable seaside resort architecture: two-storey buildings with high-ceilinged rooms and white, wooden porches.

The construction boom of the 1950s and 1960s brought about another major change. Simple brick houses were built, very often meant to be small guest houses. In addition the first true summer homes were constructed in the post-war era. In the 1980s and 1990s almost all land that could be covered with buildings inside the village was used, so new constructions regularly meant demolishing old structures. Since the 1980s, almost exclusively holiday apartment houses have been built, some leaning towards a retro-Frisian style - most of them being two-and-a-half storeys buildings with four to six flats. This has not only displaced the traditional family-run guest houses, but it alsodecreased the housing space available for long-term residents of Wenningstedt. Tower blocks like in Westerland have not been built, only some flat blocks were constructed along the main road in the early 1980s.

=== New street names ===
In cooperation with the Amt Landschaft Sylt a revision of street names and house numbering was undertaken, which became effective on 1 January 2006. This revision had become urgent since the extensive construction of the past 50 years had made it difficult for emergency services, postmen and also guests to find their way around.

== Geography ==
=== Municipal subdivisions ===
Wenningstedt-Braderup consists of Wenningstedt on the west coast of Sylt and Braderup, located on the Wadden Sea eastern coast of the island. Due to its significantly higher number of residents, Wenningstedt constitutes the municipality's centre with a communal office, spa bureau and retail businesses. Braderup does not have an original village core but until the mid-19th century was merely a hamlet of a few scattered farmsteads. Even today there are no major tourist facilities or hotels there.

== Economy ==
Wenningstedt's economy, as everywhere on Sylt, is highly dependent on tourism. There is hardly any industry that is not at least indirectly influenced by the tourism business. Like the immediate hotel and restaurant industry, retailers and several service enterprises are also dependent on the tourists' spending.

=== Tourism ===
Wenningstedt calls itself a "families' spa" and with about a million overnight stays booked, it is the fifth-largest tourist resort in Schleswig-Holstein. These bookings are distributed among 7,000 guest beds, 2,000 of which are accounted for by the Wenningstedt camping site, roughly 4,000 to holiday apartments and the remainder are shared by hotels and guest houses.

Wenningstedt is moreover recognised as a spa in Germany, yet classical spa treatments are almost extinct due to changes in German health insurance regulations. Thus today less than 2% of all tourists are traditional spa guests who have been prescribed a cure. Wenningstedt's value as a health resort is however still uncontested, the North Sea with its stimulating climate enhances one's health and trains the immune system without any additional treatment. The village's spa centre, which once offered cures and applications like taking the waters, massages and balneotherapy, has been closed and demolished.

Tourism in Wenningstedt does also profit from two adjacent golf courses that were established in the 1980s.

== Attractions ==
=== Denghoog ===
The Denghoog dolmen, which was built in the Neolithicum around 3000 BC, is located on the northern outskirts of Wenningstedt. Its name means Thing Hill. It is made up of twelve supporting stones that carry a ceiling of stone slabs. It was first excavated in 1868 and since 1928 has been open to the public.

=== Others ===
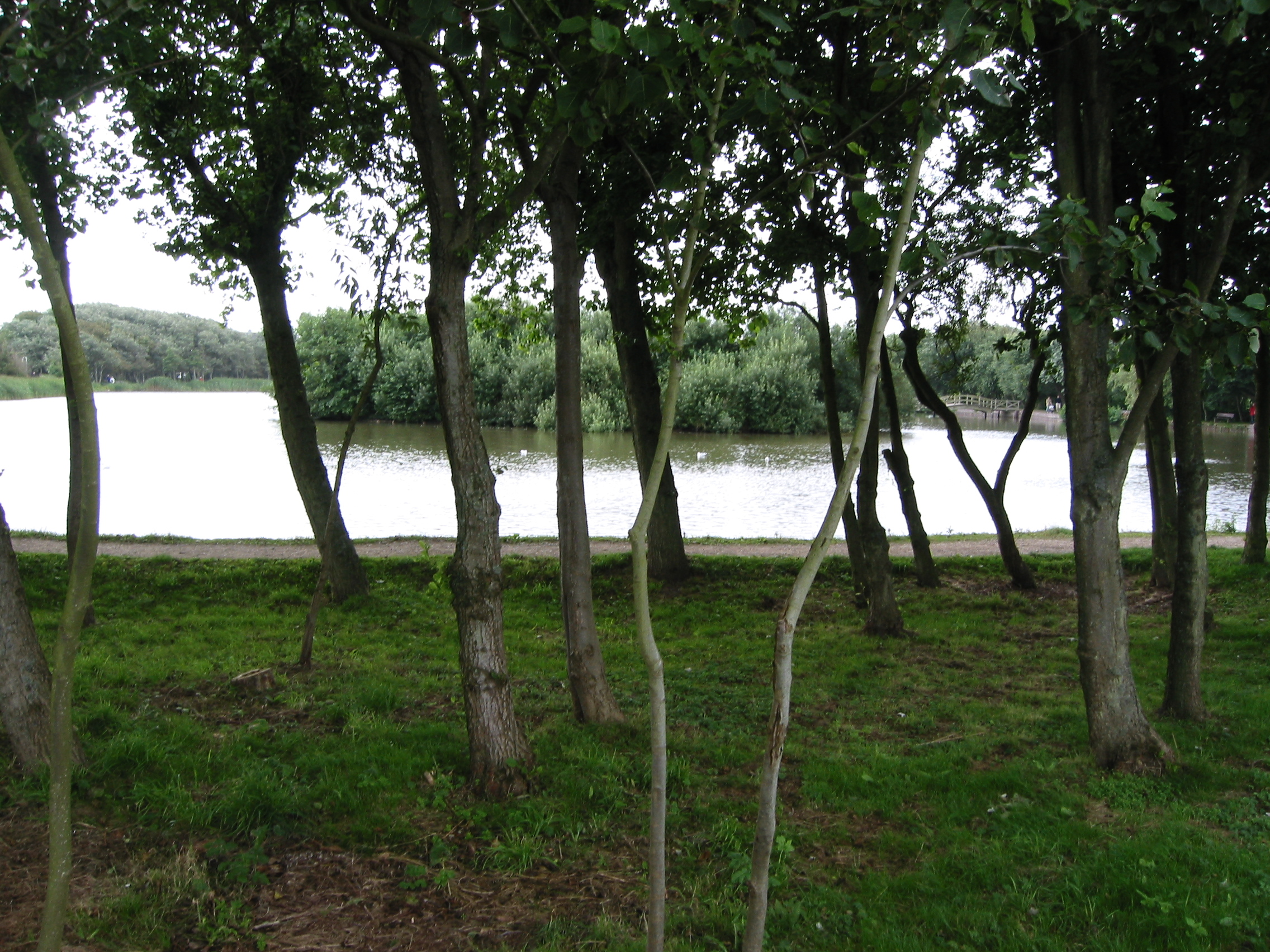
Wenningstedt village pond

Another local attraction is the village pond of Wenningstedt. In the 1950s it was gifted to the municipality by its former owner under the premise that the village keeps it open to the public and preserves it as a place of recreation. The statutes rule that the adjacent buildings have to have thatched roofs in order to maintain the rural charm of the village.

Wenningstedt is located at the edge of an area of dunes ending in the Rotes Kliff (Red Cliff) stretching north to Kampen. Below the cliff there is a sandy beach all along the village, which especially in summer serves as a major tourist attraction.

Northeast of the village of Braderup there is the Braderup heath. Already in the 1920s this rough landscape was declared a nature reserve. The area borders directly on the Schleswig-Holstein Wadden Sea National Park, where guided mudflat hiking tours are on offer.

== Government ==
The current Bürgermeisterin (mayor) is Katrin Fifeik.

=== Arms ===
Blazon: Per bend left wavy. Dexter azure, a Viking ship emerging or with a dragon's head langued sable pheony. Sinister argent, two pales wavy azure per bend left.

== Religion ==
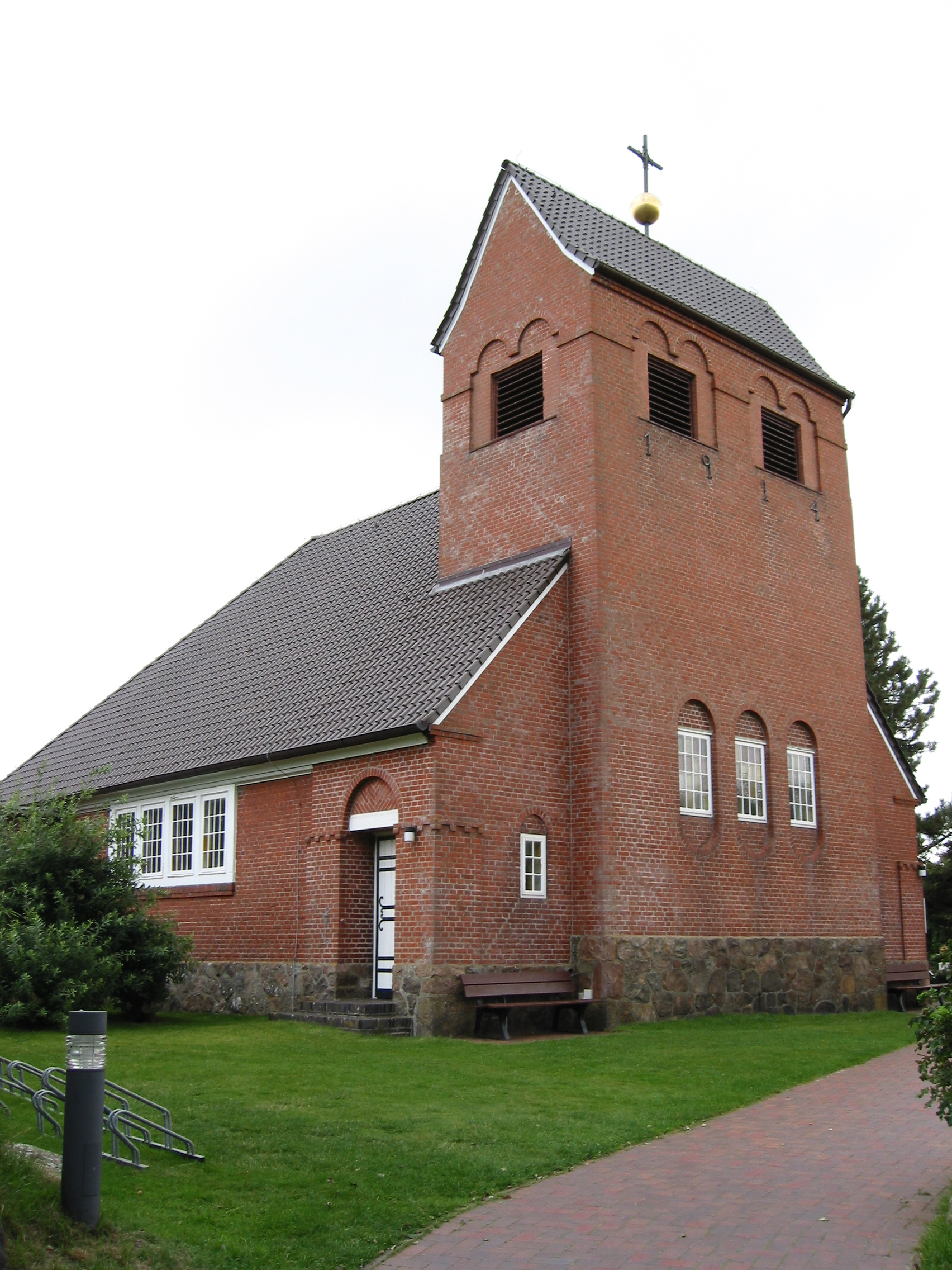
The Frisian Chapel

Of old the Frisian people were pagans from a Christian point of view. With their missioning the Frisians officially became Christian but kept a lot of old traditions, e.g. the Biikebrennen. The first church for Wenningstedt was located in the neighbouring village of Keitum. Only in 1914 the so-called Frisian Chapel was built in the immediate vicinity of an ancient pagan ritual site. Until then, the people of Wenningstedt had to take on the uncomfortable trip to Keitum - only for tourists and only in summer a church service was at times held in the hall of the Friesenhof inn in Wenningstedt. The closest Roman Catholic church is St. Christopher in Westerland.

In September 2005, a foundation was established to maintain the Frisian Chapel and the pastor's post. With "Üüs Serk - Unsere Kirche" (Our church), the Norddörfer Parish wants to secure its work in the villages of Kampen, Wenningstedt and Braderup. € 725,000 have so far been gathered as a founding asset. On a long-term prospect €1 million is needed. In the meantime, the parish hopes to earn €50,000 per annum from interest alone to maintain its work.

=== Buddhism ===
The physician and author Paul Dahlke introduced Buddhism to the island in the 1920s. In 1914, he built a "Buddhist Home" in Wenningstedt, which was supposed to serve as a meeting point and temple for Buddhists on Sylt. He refrained from constructing an already planned Buddhist monastery, though, which would have been the first of its kind on European soil, because he thought the island was not remote enough. However, in 1920, at the spot he had already designated and purchased for his monastery, he erected a "Buddha monument" which gradually decayed after his death and was eventually torn down in the early 1940s. Today, Buddhism does not play a role on Sylt any more.
