= Rotes Kliff =

Coordinates: 54°57′03″N 8°19′27″E

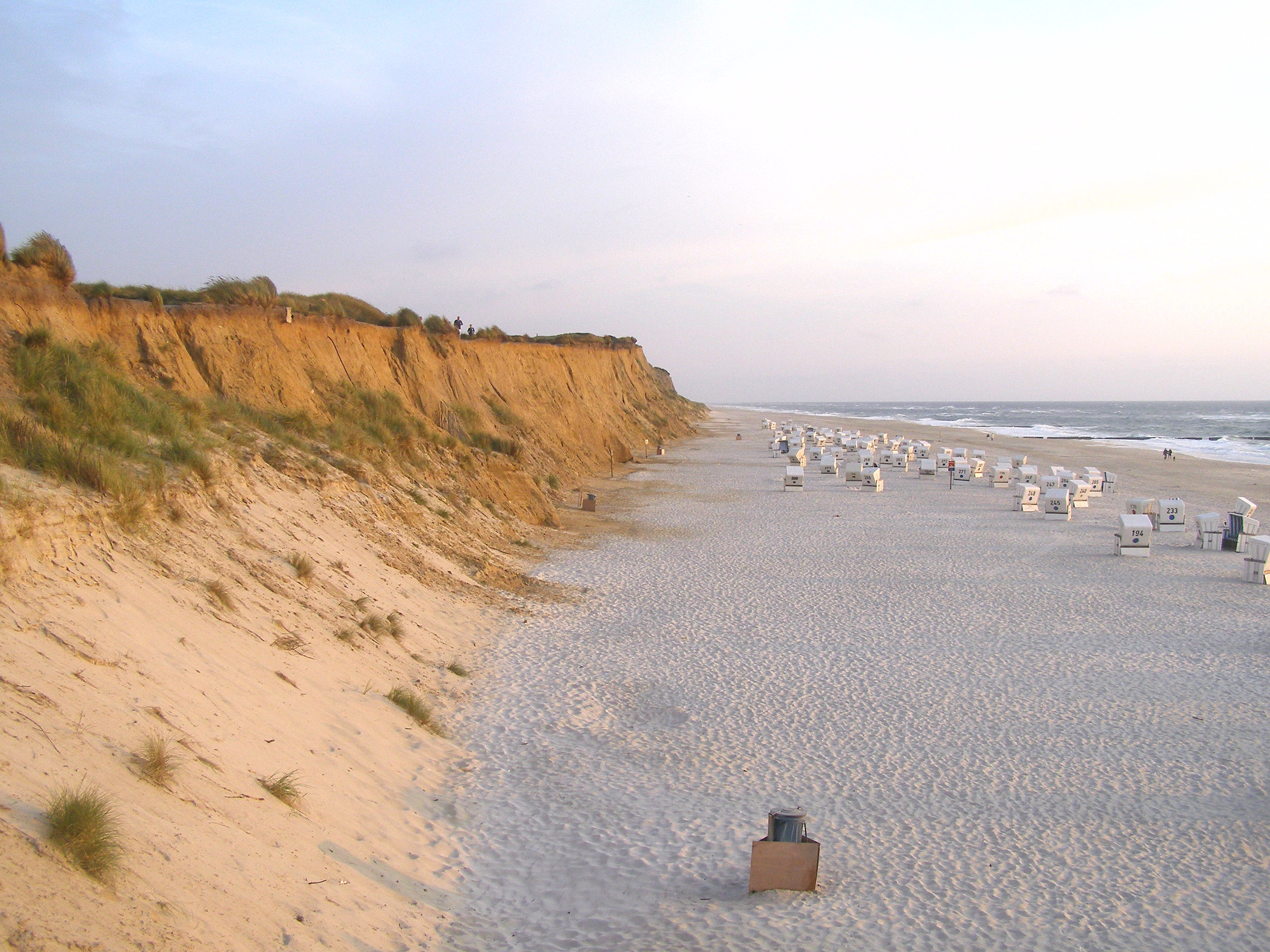
The Rotes Kliff in 2007

The Rotes Kliff is a around 30-metre high line of sea cliffs between the villages of Wenningstedt and Kampen on the German North Sea island of Sylt. It is located on the west side of the island facing the open sea, beginning in the south at the car park of "Risgap" in Wenningstedt and ending in the north at Haus Kliffende on the Kampen West Heath.

For centuries these striking cliffs have acted as an unmistakable recognition mark of the island for ships. Nowhere on the German and Dutch North Sea shores is there such a striking cliffed coast.

About 120,000 years ago, glaciers of the Saale glaciation deposited thick, unsorted rock debris in the region of the present-day island of Sylt. As a result of rising sea levels in the post-glacial period, these formed an abrasion coastline. The rusty-red glacial till, which gives the cliffs their name, is caused by colouration arising from the oxidation of ferrous elements.

Even in the 19th century, geologists suspected there was a geological connexion between Sylt and Heligoland, whose rocks have a similar coloration but are considerably older and have a different genesis. The rocks that break off the Rotes Kliff - such as flint, rhomb porphyry or Rapakivi granite - still enable an accurate determination of their origin to be made.

The Rotes Kliff has always been at great risk from storm surges and erosion. Since the end of the 1970s, coastal defence measures have been taken, however, in the shape of extensive sand replenishment of the entire west beach of the island and this has proved an important protection against the loss of land. However this has also resulted in the Rotes Kliff in the municipality of Wenningstedt becoming largely invisible from the sea, because it is now hidden behind beach grass-covered sand dunes.

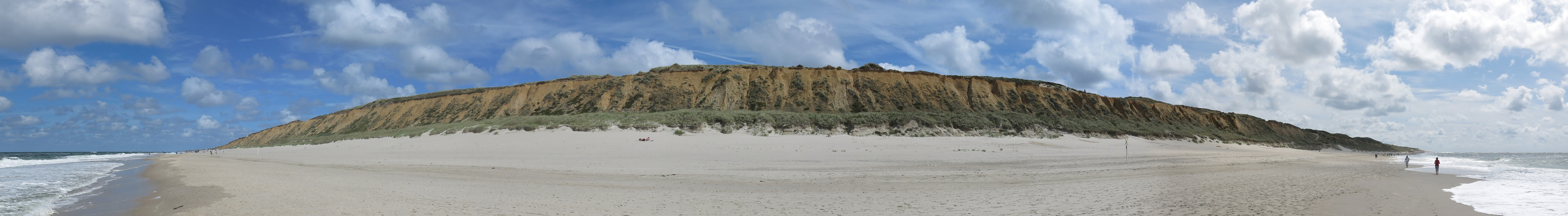
Rotes Kliff, seen from the beach between Wenningstedt and Kampen
