= Kampen Lighthouse =

Lighthouse in Schleswig-Holstein, Germany

Kampen Lighthouse Rotes Kliff
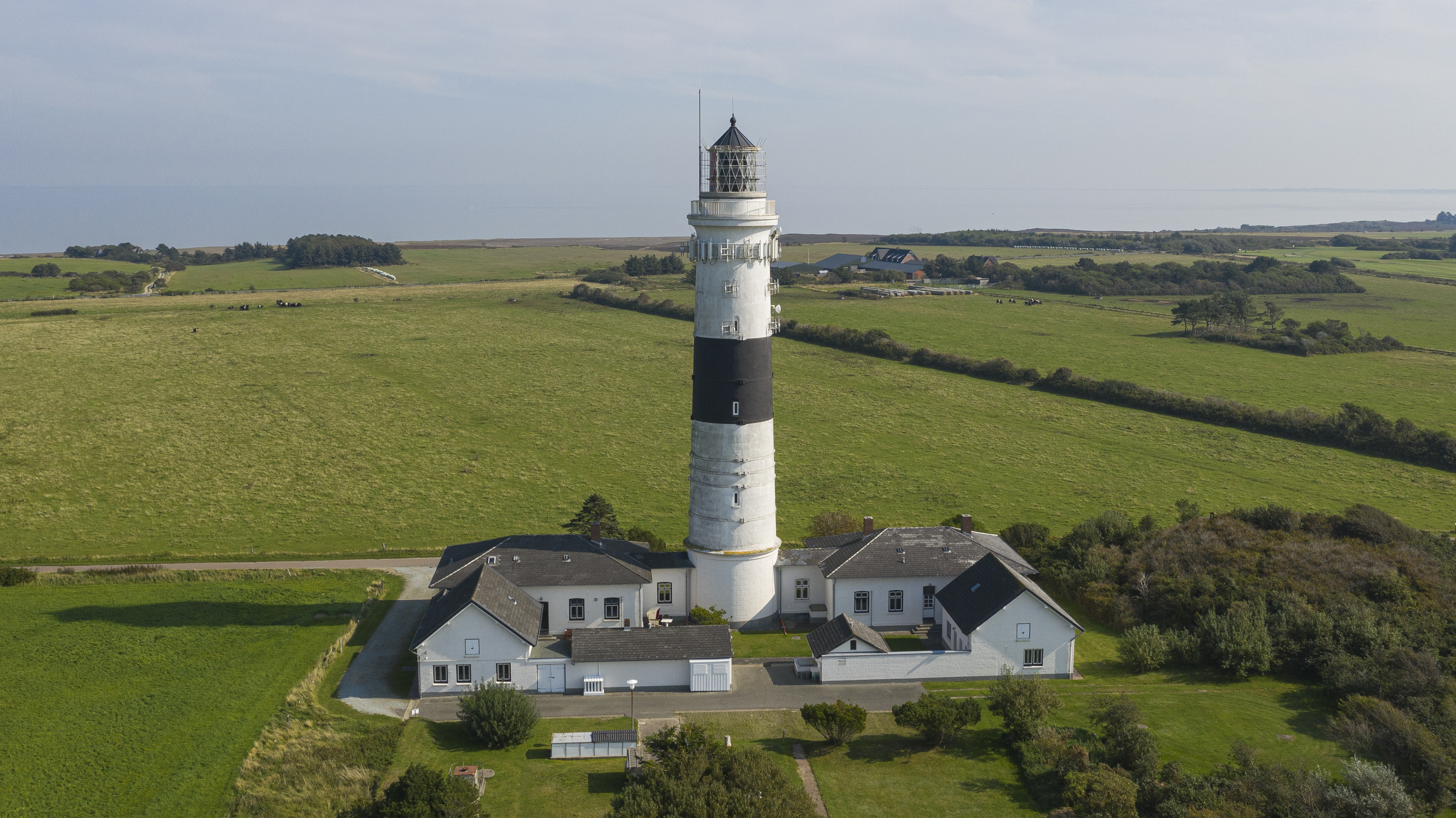
- Location: Sylt, Germany
- Coordinates: 54.946197°N 8.340836°E

Tower
- Constructed: 1855
- Construction: stone tower with iron rings
- Automated: 1977
- Height: 40 metres (130 ft)
- Shape: tapered cylindrical tower with balcony and lantern
- Markings: white tower with a horizontal black band
- Operator: Wasserstraßen- und Schifffahrtsamt Tönning (–2021), Wasserstraßen- und Schifffahrtsamt Elbe-Nordsee (2021–)
- Heritage: Heritage monument in Schleswig-Holstein

Light
- First lit: 1856
- Focal height: 62 metres (203 ft)
- Lens: Fresnel belt lens
- Range: white: 20 nautical miles (37 km; 23 mi) red: 16 nautical miles (30 km; 18 mi)
- Characteristic: ISO 7 s

The Kampen Lighthouse is located on the geestland core of the German island of Sylt, south of Kampen. It is a white conical stone tower with a broad black band.

== History ==
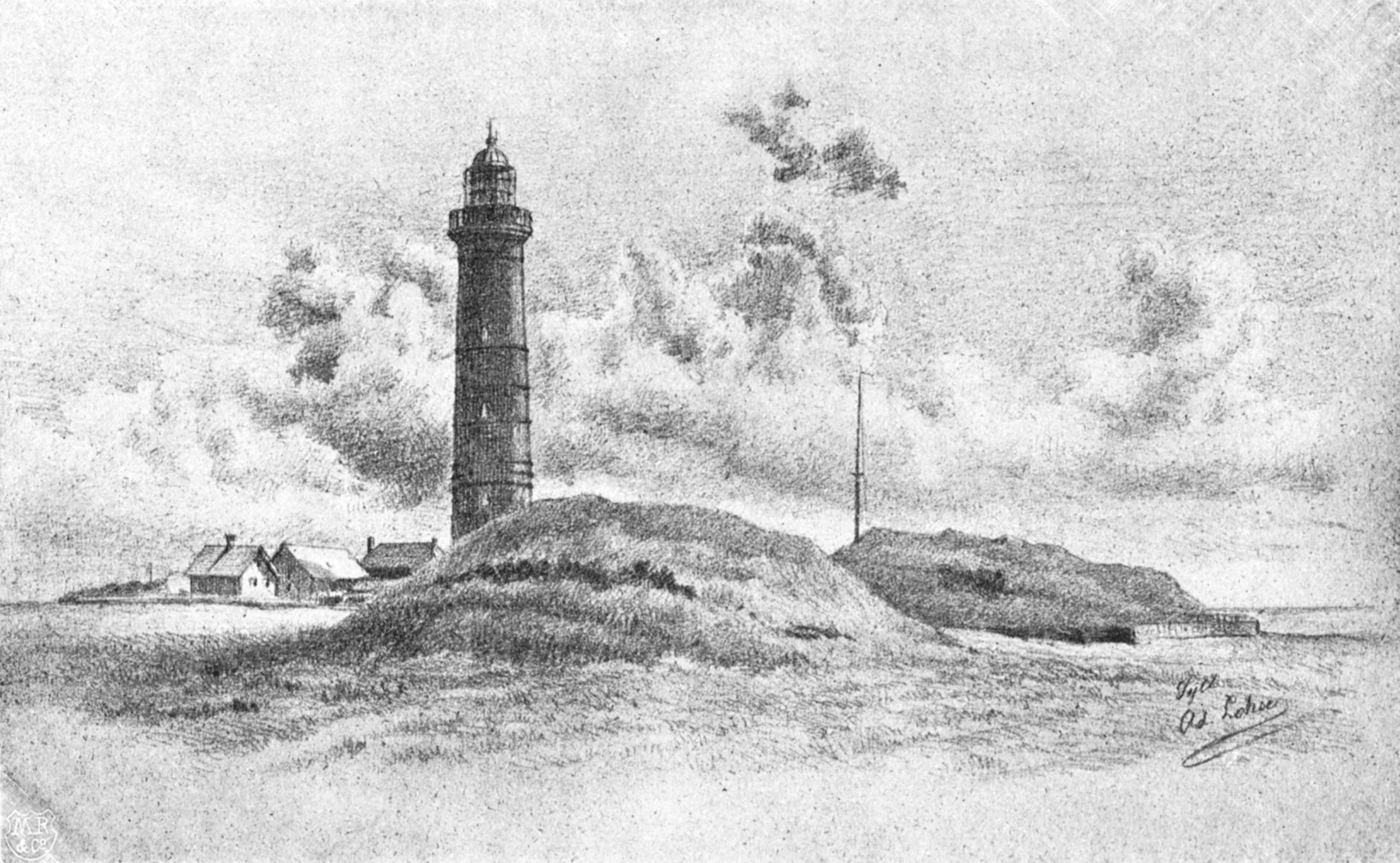
Kampen lighthouse in 1895

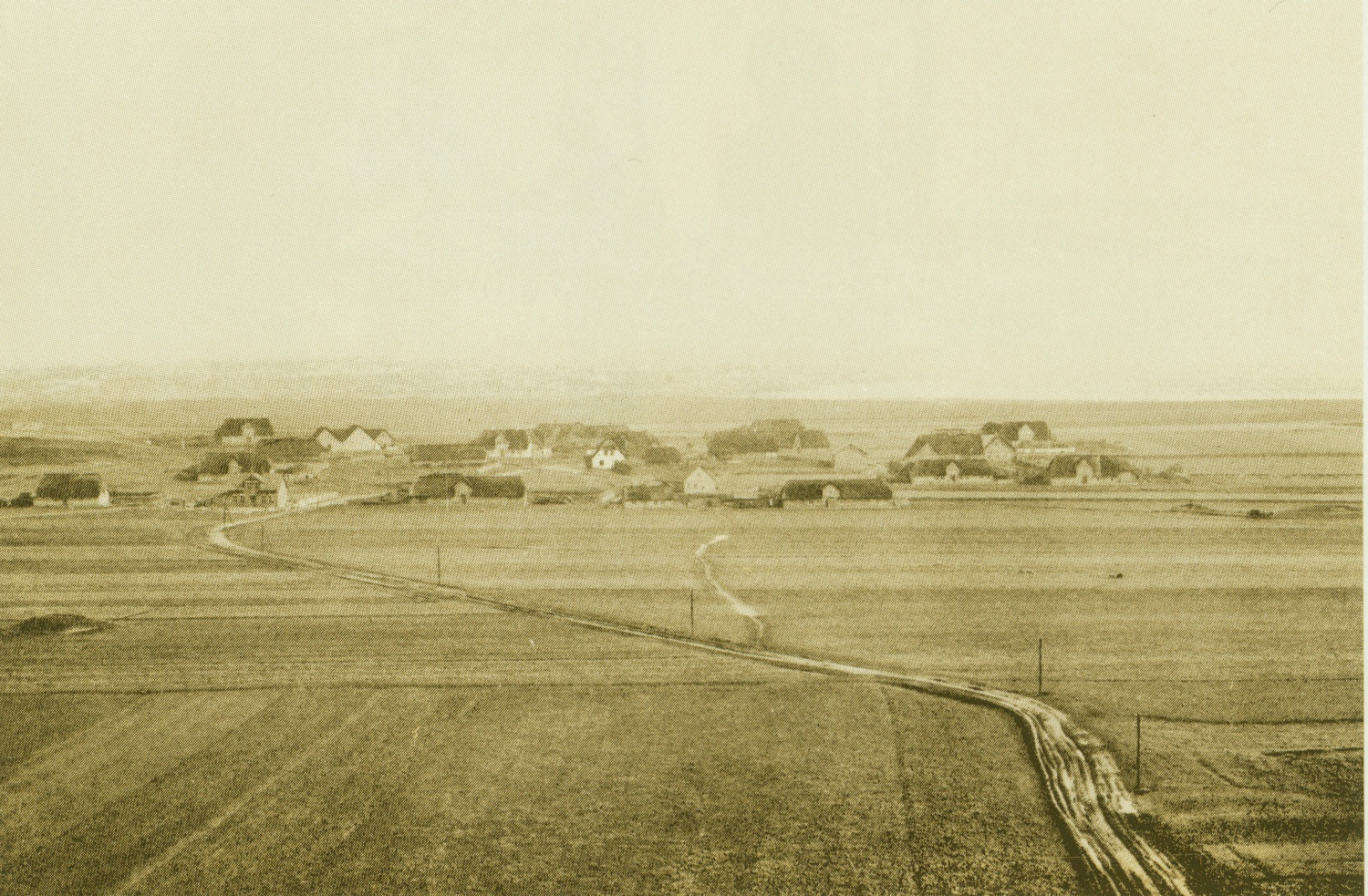
The village of Kampen in 1894 as seen from atop the lighthouse.

When Sylt belonged to the Danish realm in 1853, King Frederick VII ordered the construction of a lighthouse on Sylt's highest elevation, the red cliff. The tower was first lit in 1856. Its original petroleum lantern was at the time a technical revolution and was displayed at the Paris World Exhibition in 1855.

The tower was originally constructed from yellow Bornholm bricks and was reinforced with iron rings in 1875.

Until 1953, the lighthouse used to be greyish-yellow, the colour of the whithered bricks. Only then was it painted with its characteristic black and white.

In the early years after its inauguration, the facility became popular with locals and tourists. Specifically, guest books from the 1970s and 80s bear witness to this. Unlike today, the tower could then still be accessed and visited by the public and provided views across the island.

In 1929 the so far greatest modification was made when the entire lantern house was altered and the light source was changed from petroleum to electricity.

There are no lighthouse keepers any more since 1977, like all active lights on Sylt, the Kampen lighthouse is remotely controlled by a time switch in Koblenz. It is lit an hour prior to sunset and doused one hour after sunrise.

Only once in its 150 years of existence, the lighthouse was severely threatened. Wehrmacht plans proposed the expansion of an airfield on the nearby Braderup heath and the tower would have to be detonated. With the occupation of Denmark and Norway in 1940 these plans became obsolete though as the strategic importance of Sylt had significantly decreased.

From 2004 to 2005 the lighthouse was elaborately renovated and was therefore completely scaffolded for several months. On 4 June 2006, the 150th anniversary was celebrated with a Turmfest and the rare opportunity was provided to scale the newly renovated tower. Admission tickets were drawn.

== In popular culture ==
Due to its characteristic black and white marking the tower has become a popular motive for painters.

== See also ==
- List of lighthouses in Germany
