= Kampen (Sylt) =

Kampen, Sylt
- Municipality
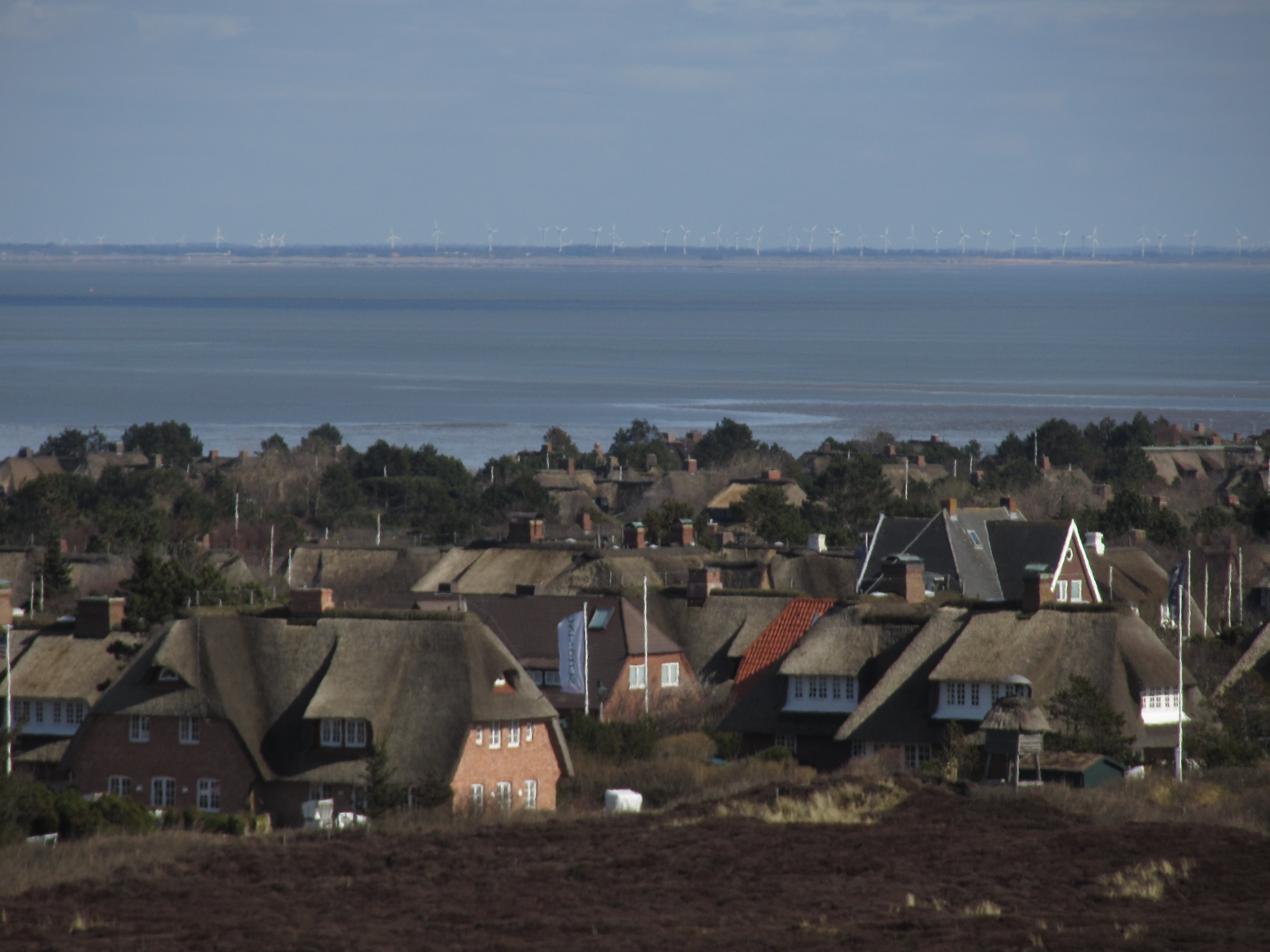
- View over Kampen from Uwedüne

- Flag Coat of arms

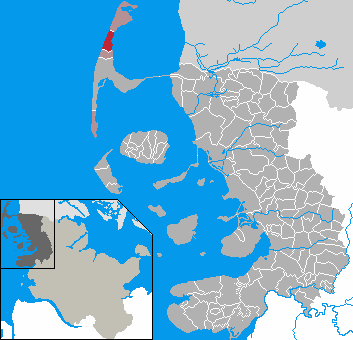
- Location of Kampen, Sylt within Nordfriesland district
- Interactive map of Kampen, Sylt
- Location within Germany Location within Schleswig-Holstein
- Coordinates: 54°57′N 8°20′E
- Country: Germany
- State: Schleswig-Holstein
- District: Nordfriesland
- Municipal assoc.: Landschaft Sylt

Government
  - Mayor: Stefanie Böhm

Area
  - Total: 8.43 km^{2} (3.25 sq mi)
- Elevation: 1 m (3.3 ft)

Population (2025-12-31)
  - Total: 489
  - Density: 58.0/km^{2} (150/sq mi)
- Time zone: UTC+01:00 (CET)
  - Summer (DST): UTC+02:00 (CEST)
- Postal codes: 25998–25999
- Dialling codes: 0 46 51
- Vehicle registration: NF
- Website: www.kampen.de

Kampen (German pronunciation: [ˈkampn̩]; officially Kampen (Sylt); Söl'ring Frisian: Kaamp; Danish: Kampen) is a municipality and seaside resort on the island Sylt, in the district of Nordfriesland, in Schleswig-Holstein, Germany. It is located north of the island's main town, Westerland. The municipality is part of the Amt Landschaft Sylt. The local economy is dominated by tourism.

== Etymology ==
The name Kaamp means "a marked out field".

== History ==
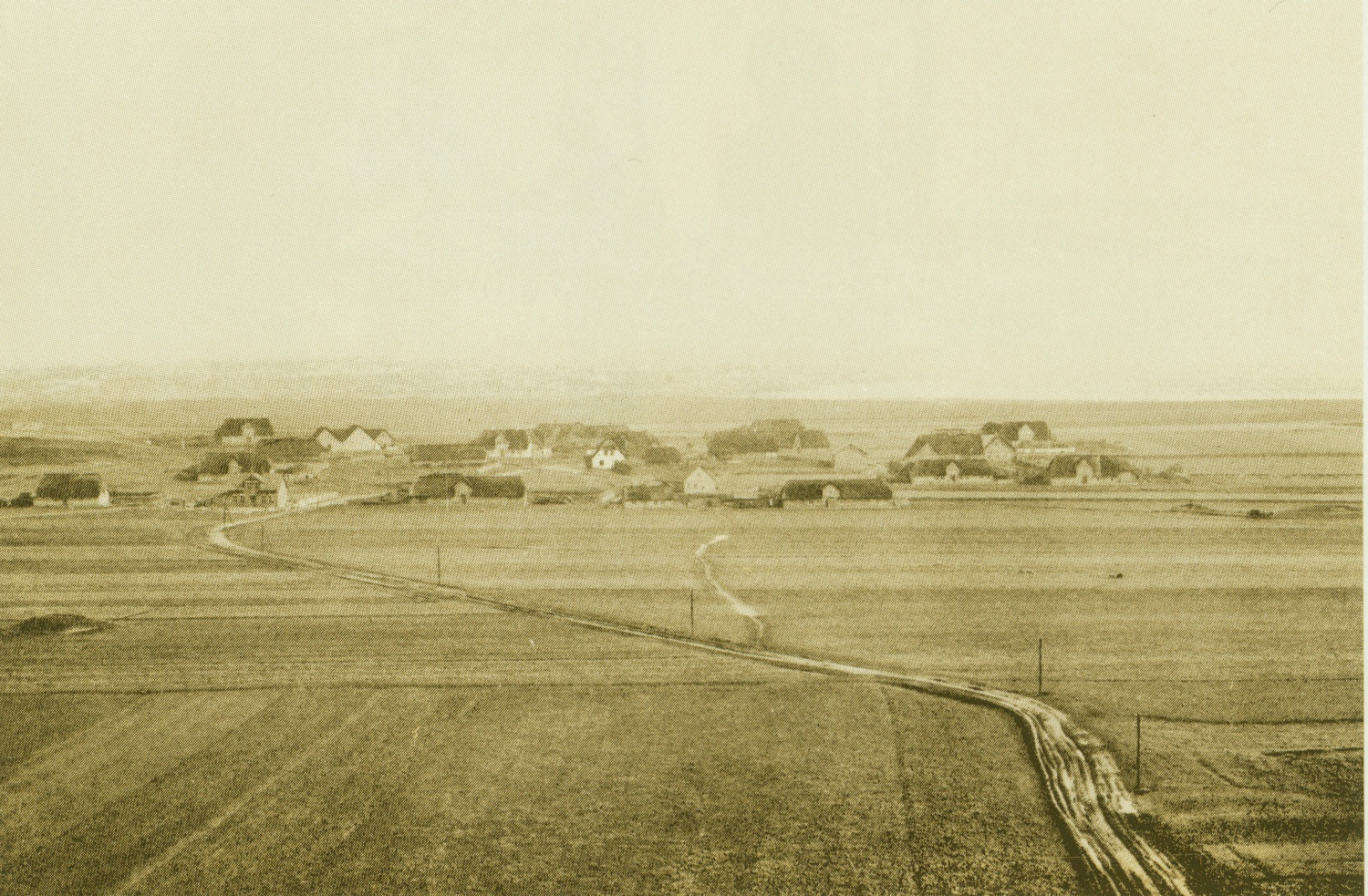
Kampen in 1894 as seen from atop the Kampen Lighthouse

The first mention of Kampen occurs in a tax registry from 1543. The village is considered to have been founded quite late, possibly as a result of people moving there from an earlier settlement destroyed by a storm.

In 1767, the local Landvogt and some inhabitants bought land to the north of the village and established the Kampener Vogelkoje, a decoy. This was profitable over the next four decades and through 1921 yielded a total of 695,957 killed ducks.

In 1803, Kampen consisted of 23 houses and 93 inhabitants (40 men and 53 women, of which 23 were seafarers). In 1853, King Frederick VII of Denmark ordered the construction of the Kampen Lighthouse. In 1860, the number of houses had fallen to 22 and there were still 93 inhabitants, however, just three of them were seafarers. In 1864, Kampen became Prussian.

For centuries, until around 1900, Kampen was a rural village shaped by agriculture. Shipping and fishing as well as other industries and crafts played a relatively smaller role in the village's development. Together with Wenningstedt, the village of Kampen constituted part of the so-called "Northern Villages" (Norddörfer) of Sylt. The church and school were shared due to the low number of citizens in the respective villages – so they could only be supported through a common effort.

Kampen, a quiet hamlet situated in a heath, was discovered by tourists quite late. Until the beginning of the 20th century the place was merely regarded an insider's tip among travellers. Only in the 1920s did Kampen's reputation as a seaside resort begin to develop. An ordinance from 1912, which is still effective today, requires that all houses in the village be built in the traditional style, i.e. brick buildings with thatched roofs.

In July 1903, Kampen was linked by the Sylter Nordbahn to Westerland. In 1908, this was extended north to List. In 1908, the Nordseebad Kampen auf Sylt GmbH (founded in 1904) built a large two-storied octagonal wooden pavilion on the northern heath, around 400 metres from the Kurhaus (it was demolished in 1922). Even earlier, in 1906, a development plan had called for covering all of the northwestern heath with new construction.

After World War I, the Verein Naturschutz Insel Sylt e. V. was founded. Haus Kliffende to the north of the village became a cultural and artists' meeting place in the 1920s and 1930s. In 1921, locals established the Verkehrsverein Kampen/Sylt e. V. to boost tourism.

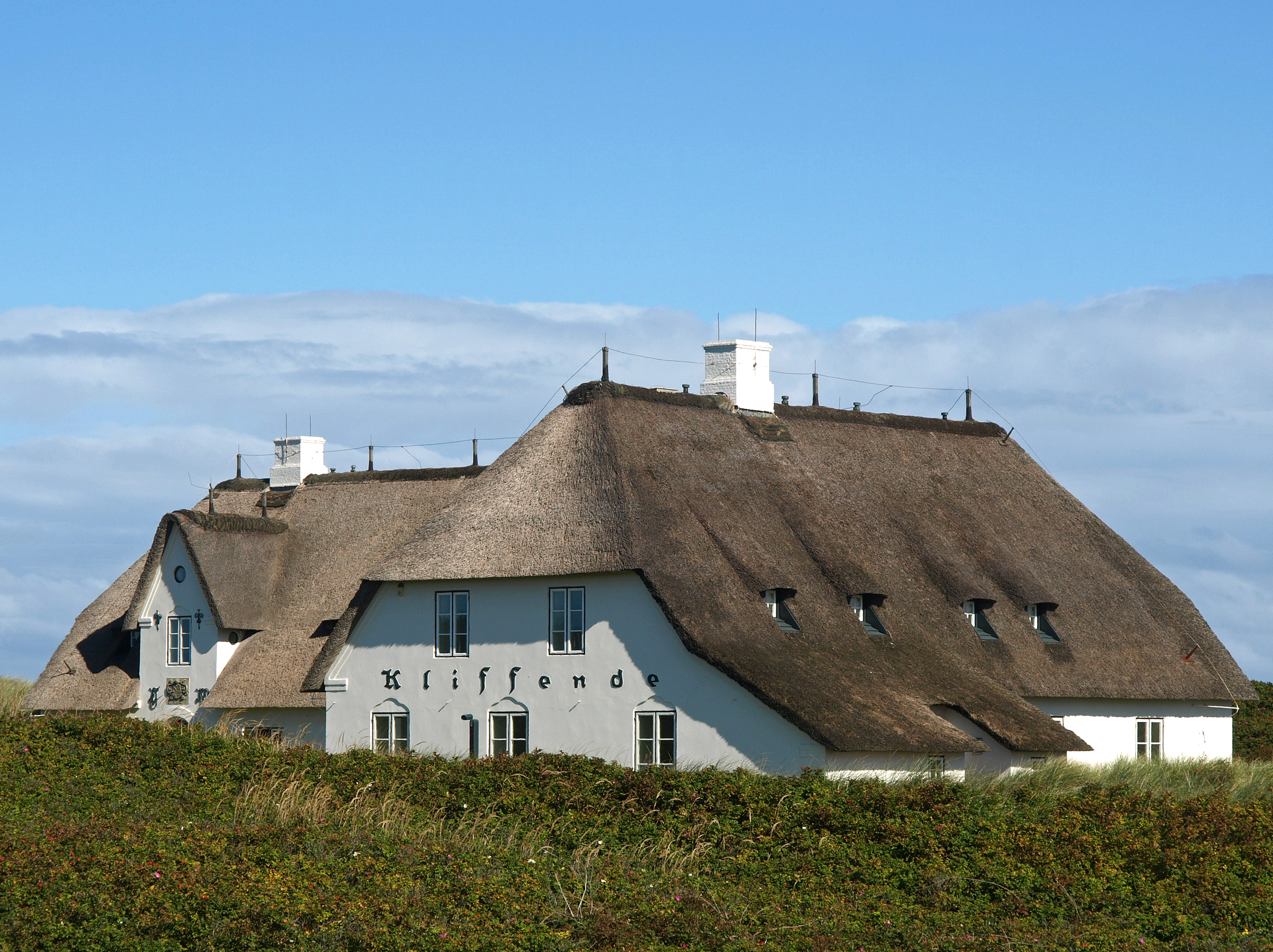
Haus Kliffende.

Beginning in 1921, writer Thomas Mann was a guest of Siegfried Jacobsohn and later often stayed at Haus Kliffende, north of the village. Many other intellectuals, musicians, writers and other artists flocked to the area. These included Max Frisch, Emil Nolde, Carl Zuckmayer, Heinrich Vogeler and Lovis Corinth. In 1923, there were 1,213 visitors to Kampen. Ferdinand Avenarius is considered as the first popularizer of Sylt. Today, a park is named after him.

Kampen became a separate municipality on 21 March 1927, when the Norddörfer association was dissolved by the Prussian authorities, creating the Landgemeinde Kampen.

In 1938, there were 25,0000 visitors and more than 500 Ehrenkurgäste.

Prior to – and during – World War II camps to accommodate troops were established in Kampen by the Wehrmacht. A major camp was located near today's public camping site in the southwestern part of the village. It had been built due to the expansion of the air field in Braderup. There was, however, no direct combat action, nor did Kampen suffer any remarkable damage from the allied bombings.

East of the village there was an anti-aircraft site with many bunkers and shelters. In the immediate post-war years, Kampen had 370 inhabitants and they were joined by 1,927 refugees from Germany's former eastern territories housed in the former military installations. In the 1950s, the Café Kupferkanne was established inside the anti-aircraft facility. The Lager Skagerak became a youth hostel.

After World War II the village became a venue of the "rich and famous" – the tycoons of the Wirtschaftswunder. Also many celebrities of cinema and television thought Kampen to be fashionable. Gunter Sachs was one of those the public associated with the village.

In the 1960s there was a considerable boost in the naturist movement. Especially the nude beach at Buhne 16 in Kampen gained popularity by frequent media reports.

TV productions such as Tatort: Strandgut (1972) were set in Kampen. In 1971, Kampen had been assigned the title Nordseebad.

The boom slowed down in the 1980s. Today Kampen remains an upscale tourist resort.

=== Village development ===
From the 1920s on, the summer residences and villas of mostly wealthy guests were constructed on the Nordheide around the old village core. Thus the area of Kampen multiplied within a few years. Despite early plannings from the 1920s, the western heath of Kampen was not covered with buildings though and today is a nature reserve.

== Geography ==
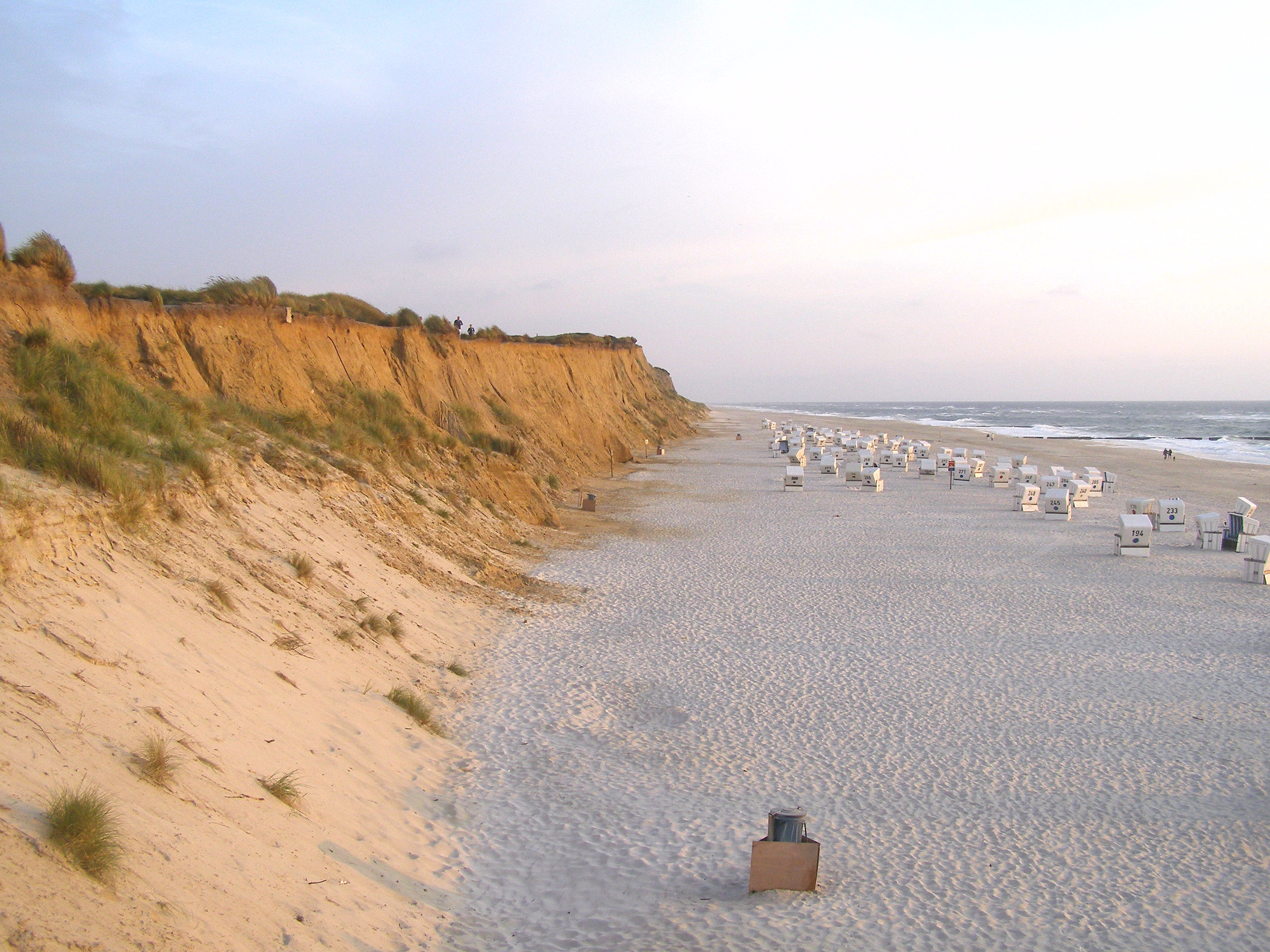
Kampen beach with Rotes Kliff.

Kampen lies on the Geest at a height of around 27 metres above NHN.

The so-called Rotes Kliff (red cliff) west of the village rises up to 30 metres from the North Sea and is highly endangered by erosion and storm surges. The Uwe Düne (dune) reaches a height of 52.5 m above sea level, making it the island's highest point. It is named after Uwe Jens Lornsen (1793–1838), a freedom fighter for a united Schleswig-Holstein who hailed from Keitum.

East of Kampen the Schleswig-Holstein Wadden Sea National Park extends, in summer the municipality offers guided mudflat hiking trips there.

== Economy ==
Like all municipalities on Sylt, Kampen is highly specialised on the tourism business, so that an economical monostructure can be found there. The annual number of visitors is currently around 35,000.

== Attractions ==
The Kampener Vogelkoje is located roughly three kilometres north of Kampen. Nowadays this is a nature reserve of 10 hectares for numerous species of water fowl.

There are numerous studios and artists' galleries in Kampen.

On the western heath several neolithic dolmens are located. As they are not marked, they are relatively untouched by tourism. The ancient circular rampart of Kampen also remains largely unnoticed.

== Government ==
The current Bürgermeisterin (mayor) is Stefanie Böhm.

=== Arms ===
Blazon: Azure a sea holly argent.

The municipal flag depicts the sea holly in a blue canton on an otherwise fessed flag of blue and white.

=== Town twinning ===
Since 2002 Kampen has been twinned with Lech am Arlberg in Austria. A retired cabin from a gondola lift was given to Kampen as a gift by the well-known alpine ski resort, which is now displayed on Kampen's main beach. In return Lech received a thatched bus stop shelter.

== Religion ==
Kampen does not have a church of its own. For a long time the mostly Protestant citizens had to attend church services at St. Severinus' church in Keitum, seven kilometres away.

In 1914, the "Frisian Chapel" was built in the neighbouring village of Wenningstedt, whose Norddörfer Parish also includes Kampen. During the summer months outdoors church services are held at various locations.

== Infrastructure ==
=== Transport ===
The municipality is crossed by the state road L24 which runs north–south all along the island. In addition to individual traffic, bus route No. 1 of the Sylter Verkehrsgesellschaft provides public transport.

The Kampen Lighthouse situated on the higher geestland core south of the village. It is the oldest lighthouse on the island, standing 40 metres tall with a black and white marking. Another, smaller lighthouse, the Rotes Kliff Lighthouse, is located north of Kampen on the red cliff. It served as a supplement to the main light from 1913 to 1975.

== Education ==
Together with Wenningstedt, Kampen operates the Norddörfer Schule, an elementary school located south of the village proper. There is also a kindergarten in the village.

== Literature ==
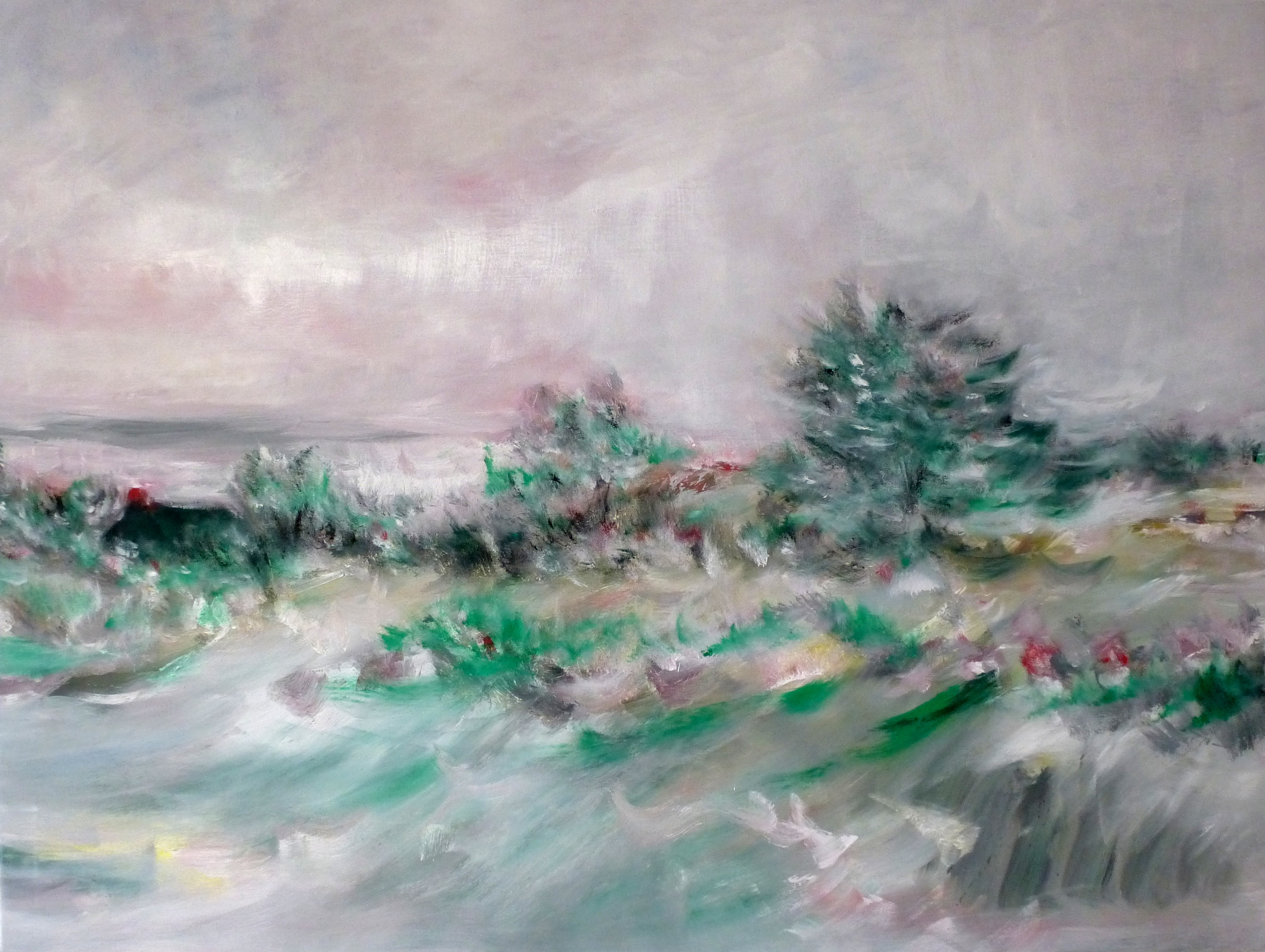
Ingo Kühl – Haus am Watt VIII 2015, oil on canvas 150 × 200 cm

- Wolfgang Mielke, ed. (2009), "Sylt", Perinique (in German), no. 8, Hamburg: Perinique, ISSN 1869-9952 48-seitiges Themenheft mit Schwerpunkt Kampen (1952–1959)
- Rolf Spreckelsen: Nordseebad Kampen auf Sylt. Die Geschichte des Bades. Hans Christians Verlag, Hamburg 1978, ISBN 3-7672-0568-8.
- Rolf Spreckelsen, Manfred Wedemeyer among others: 450 Jahre Kampen. Edited by Gemeinde Nordseebad Kampen, Sylt 1994
- Rolf Spreckelsen: Kampen – Sylt: der Flirt fürs ganze Leben; die Geschichte eines Dorfes. Christians Verlag, Hamburg 1996, ISBN 3-7672-1253-6.
- Ingo Kühl: Das Haus am Watt – Kampener Skizzen, Verlag Kettler, Dortmund 2015, ISBN 978-3-86206-473-1.
- Ingo Kühl: Das Haus am Watt (Picture book large format 42 × 30 cm), Edition Schöne Bücher, Verlag Kettler, Dortmund 2015, ISBN 978-3-86206-484-7.
