= Mudflat hiking =

Type of walking recreation

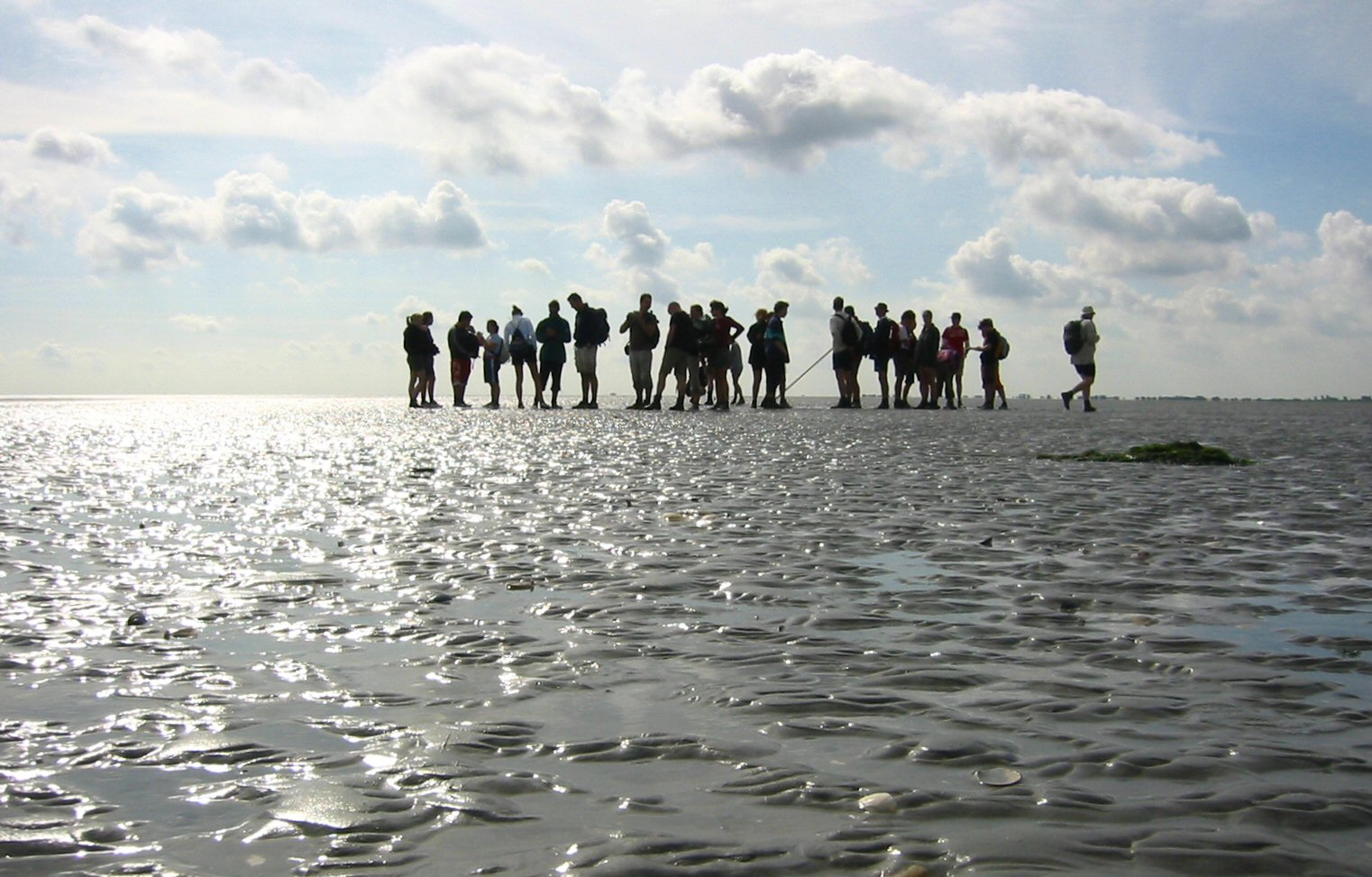
Group of mudflat hikers near Pieterburen, Netherlands

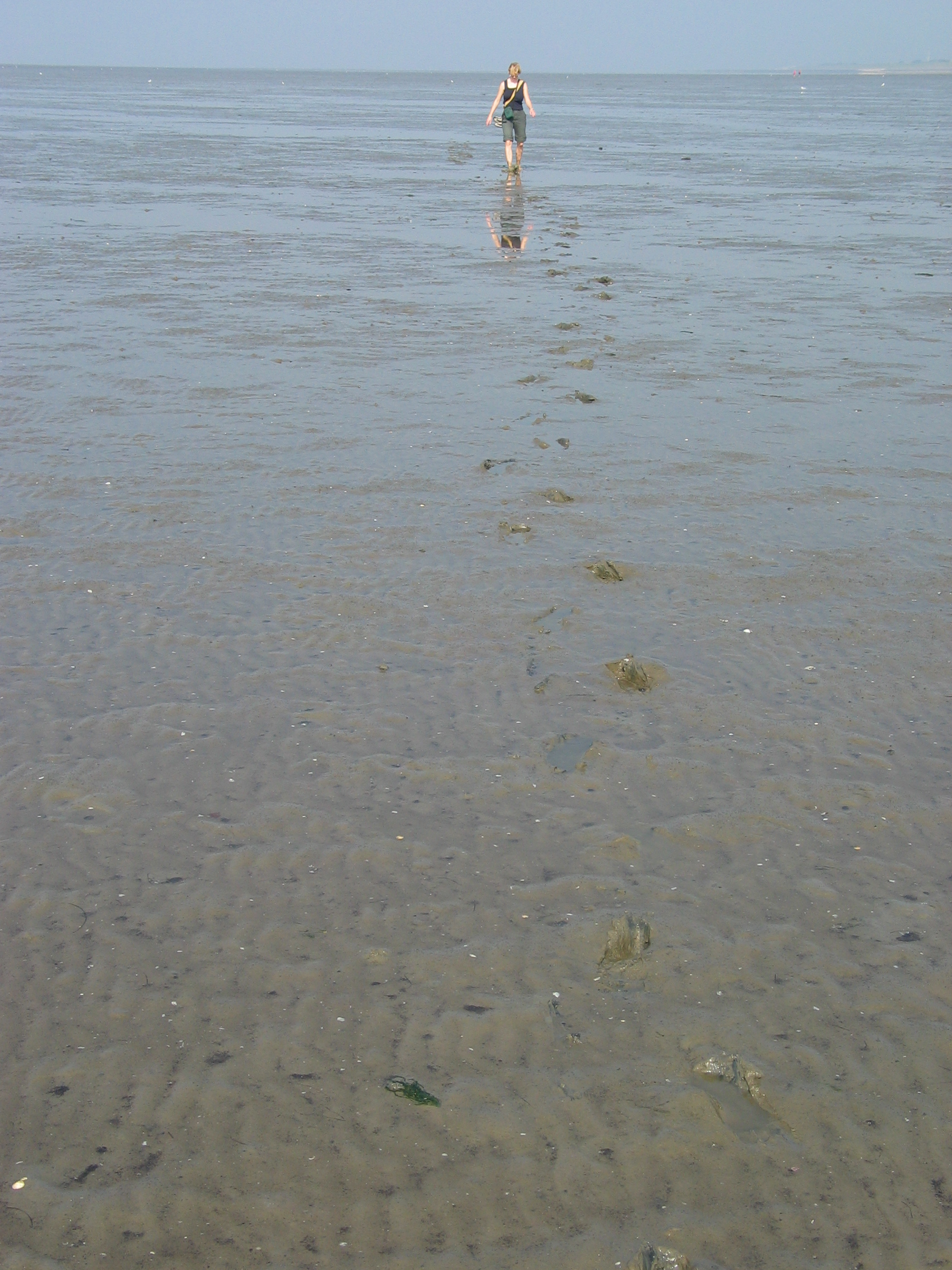
Mudflat hiker in Wadden Sea near Wilhelmshaven, Germany

Mudflat hiking (Danish: Vadehavsvandring, Dutch: Wadlopen, West Frisian: Waadrinnen, German: Wattwandern) is a recreation enjoyed in the Netherlands, northwest Germany, Denmark, England and France. Mudflat hikers are people who, with the aid of a tide table, use a period of low water to walk and wade on the watershed of the mudflats, especially from the Frisian mainland coast to the Frisian Islands.

The Wadden Sea, a belt of the North Sea, is well suited to this traditional practice. Belts of this shallow sea lie off the mainland of the Netherlands, between Friesland and the Frisian Islands; off the coast of northwestern Germany; and off the coast of southwest Jutland in Denmark.

In the Netherlands, mudflat hikers can walk from the mainland to Terschelling, Ameland, Engelsmanplaat, Schiermonnikoog, Simonszand, and Rottumeroog. Other mudflat hiking routes are known but are not recommended, either because of their inherent dangers (the correct path is difficult to follow and/or there are insufficient margins of error in timing the trip) or for the minimization of ecological disturbance, or both. In Germany, mudflat hikers can walk to the East Frisian Islands of Norderney, Baltrum, Langeoog, Spiekeroog, Minsener-Oldoog and Neuwerk. The North Frisian Halligen Süderoog, Südfall, Oland, Langeneß, Gröde, and Nordstrandischmoor as well as the island Föhr can also be reached from the mainland. There is also a connection between the islands Amrum and Föhr. For this specific route, a guide is mandatory.

In Denmark, mudflat hikers can walk to Mandø, Fanø, and Langli.

The same activity is occasionally practiced in England, most commonly making use of abandoned sub-tidal carriage roads once used by horse-drawn traffic. The best-known example is the crossing of Morecambe Bay, where guided walks along the 11km route are led by the current holder of the ancient office of King's Guide to the Sands. Another is The Broomway in Essex. Both routes pose severe potential dangers and walkers are usually led by experienced guides.

In France, it is possible to hike across Mont-Saint-Michel Bay in Normandy. As elsewhere, it is strongly recommended to do so accompanied by an official guide.

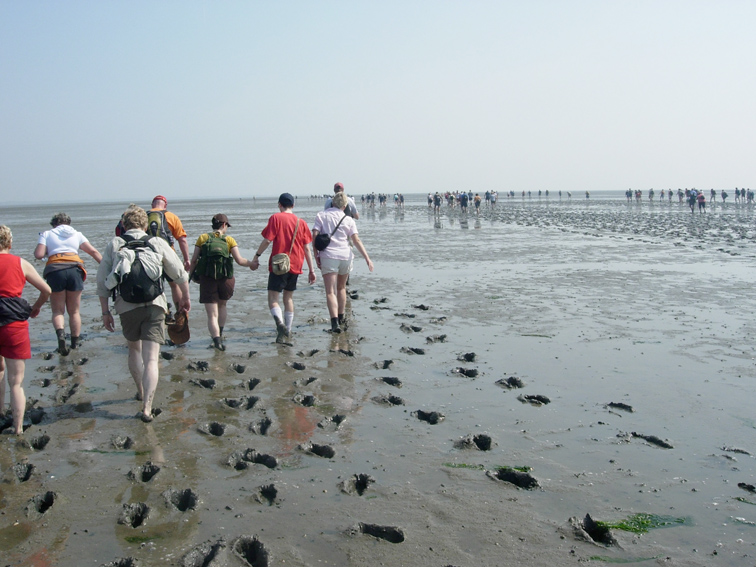
Mudflat hiking in East Frisia, Germany

== Regulation ==
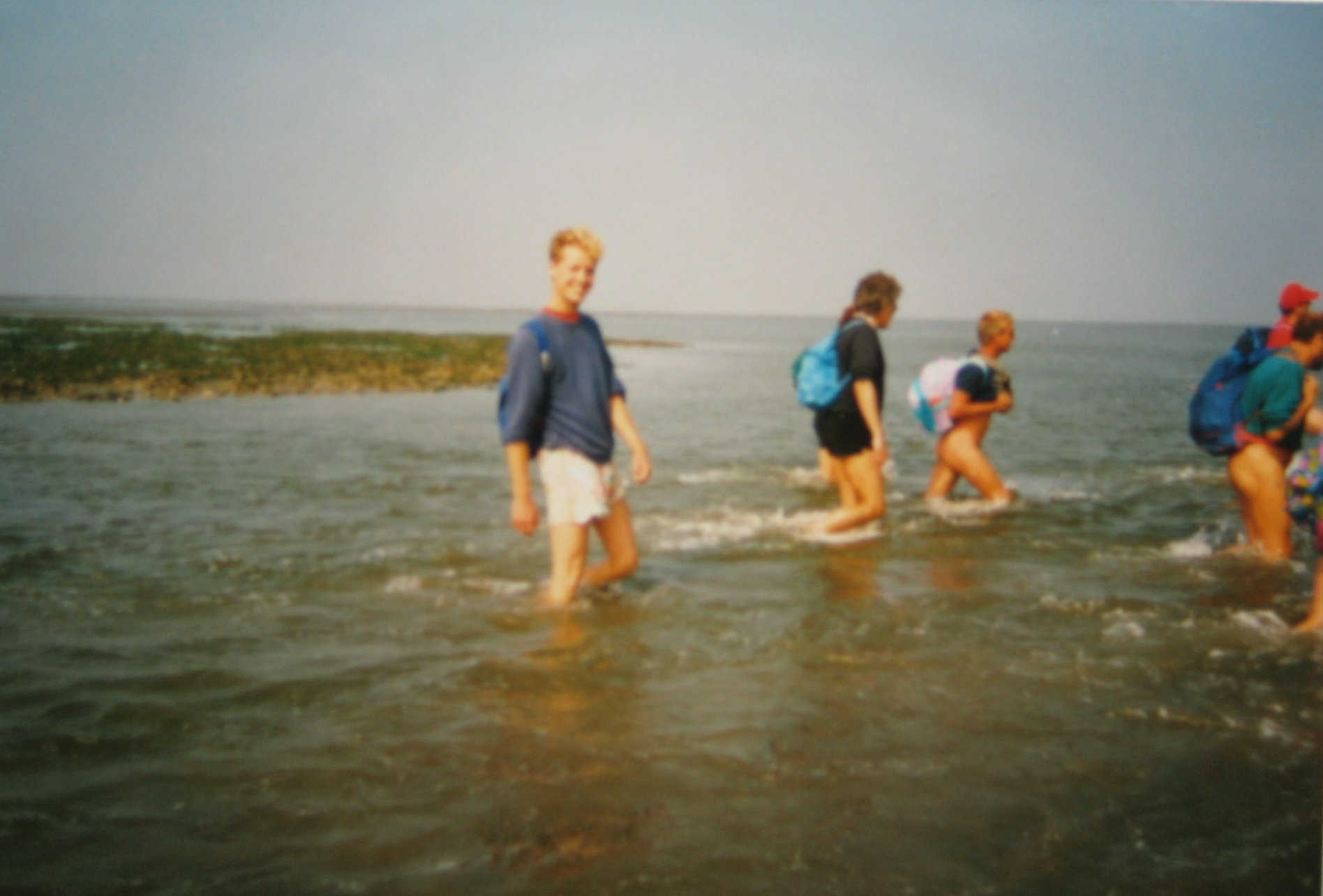
Mudflat waders

In Dutch waters, mudflat hiking is only allowed with an appropriate license or under the supervision of a licensed guide, and only on recognized routes. In the Netherlands, Dijkstra's Wadlooptochten Pieterburen, Wadloopcentrum Fryslân in Holwerd, Wadloopcentrum Pieterburen Pieterburen, Stichting Uithuizerwad Uithuizen, Wadloopvereniging Arenicola Groningen, Wadgidsengroep Noord Nederland, and the Fryske Waedrinners are organisations for the training of mudflat hiking guides and the preservation of the sport.

Though the tides change in very regular cycles, anyone can easily misjudge the situation and find themselves quickly surrounded by the rising water on all sides, far away from the beaches. A guide should be hired to prevent any mishaps.
