= North Frisian Barrier Island =

Coordinates: 54°30′N 8°29′E

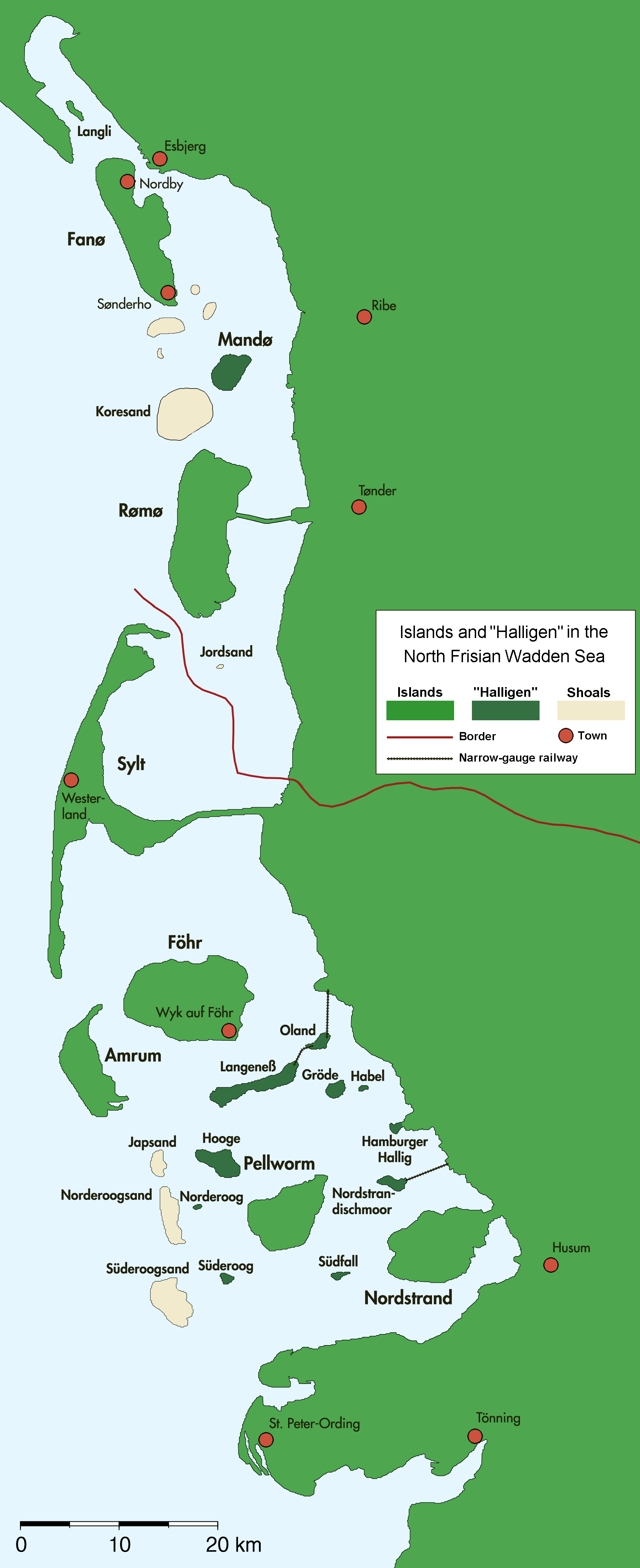
- The shoals of the North Frisian Barrier Island are marked with tan colour in the southwestern part of this map

Geography
- Location: North Sea
- Archipelago: North Frisian Islands
- Total islands: 3
- Major islands: Süderoogsand, Norderoogsand, Japsand

Administration
- Germany
- State: Schleswig-Holstein
- District: Nordfriesland

Demographics
- Population: uninhabited

North Frisian Barrier Island (German: Nordfriesische Außensände, pronounced [ˈnɔʁtˌfʁiːzɪʃə ˈʔaʊsn̩ˌzɛndə], lit. 'North Frisian Outer Sands') is the collective term for three barrier islands (outer shoals) due west of the German Halligen in the North Frisian Islands archipelago. The shoals are a natural breakwater for the Halligen and other islands closer to land. Uninhabited, they remain one of the few areas in the Wadden Sea unaffected by direct human activity.

The shoals from north to south are:

No.	sand bank	area km^{2}
1	Japsand	3
2	Norderoogsand	10
3	Süderoogsand	15
	North Frisian Barrier Island	28

The shoals are subject to constant change and slowly move towards the mainland coast to the east. This changes both their location and surface area. During the last 50 years, all three shoals benefitted from their increasing area, but their individual development was very diverse. In total, 43.5 million m^{3} of sand were eroded by wind and water on the west coasts of the shoals, whereas 32.4 million m^{3} were deposited at the eastern shorelines. Especially Japsand, which is the youngest and smallest of the three shoals, could gain volume and was the fastest moving shoal. Numerical simulations by Kiel University have shown the likelihood of a merger between Japsand and Norderoogsand by 2050. This would cover Hallig Norderoog in sand, and large areas of mudflats still east of the sands today.

The peak heights of the shoals reach about one metre above the average high tide. In summer, the dry sand is sometimes piled into dunes several metres high. Elymus grasses occasionally settle around them. Since 1999, though, an increasingly stable and diverse vegetation has been observed at the northern edge of Norderoogsand. The plant carpet helps to accumulate more sand, so the peak dune of Norderoogsand was recorded at 3.50 metres in 2013. Because of this development, Norderoogsand has been called a new island.

All three shoals are nature reserves and constitute an important resting area for migratory birds, harbour seals, and grey seals. Together with the Hooger Loch and Rummelloch-West gats, as well as the Halligen of Norderoog and Süderoog, the shoals are a popular resort for seals and form one of the main moulting areas of the common eider.

The shoals are part of the core zone of the Schleswig-Holstein Wadden Sea National Park and must not be entered except for the northern areas of Japsand. In 1985, a light beacon was erected on Süderoogsand on a wooden framework. The device is solar powered and has a shelter for shipwrecked sailors.

== Gallery ==
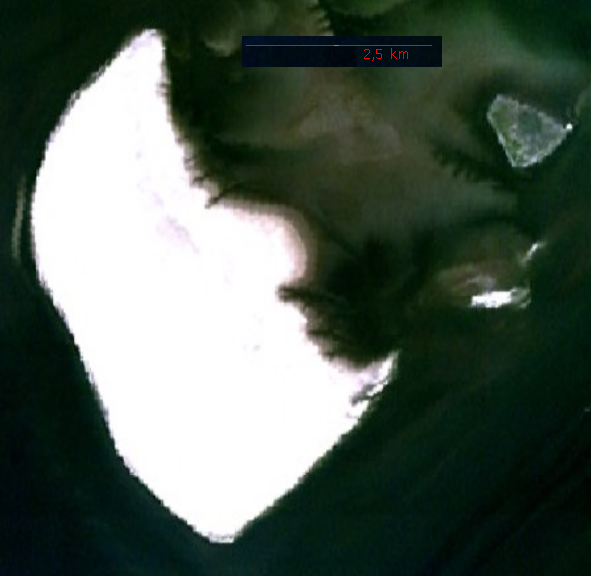
NASA Satellite Image of Süderoogsand, the largest and southernmost sand bank, with Hallig Süderoog upper right

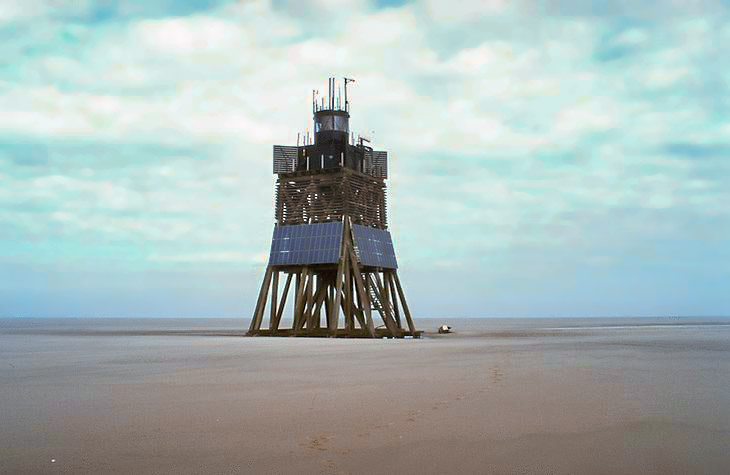
Süderoogsand with navigational light beacon
