= Hallig Habel =

North Frisian island

Habel
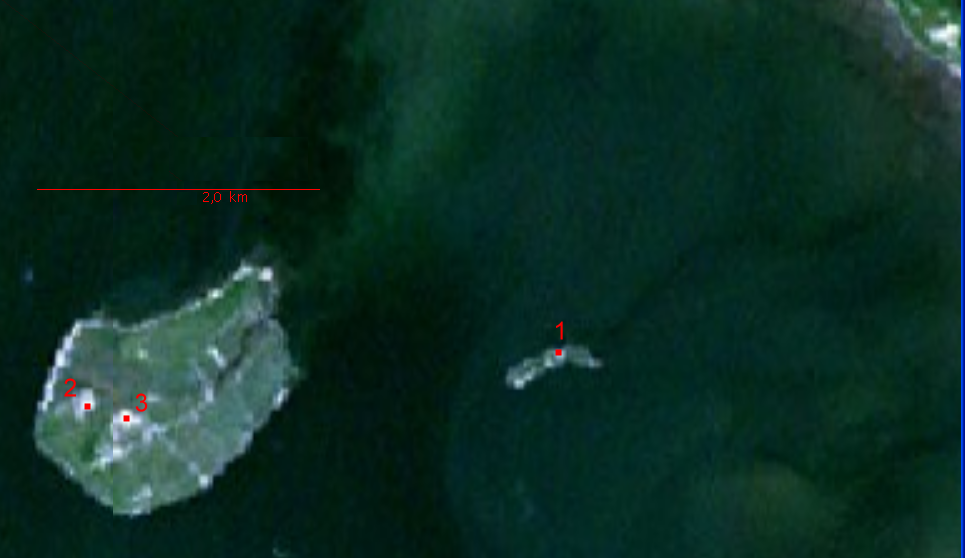
- Halligen Gröde (left) and Habel (center) on a satellite image
- Interactive map of Habel

Geography
- Coordinates: 54°38′14″N 8°46′00″E
- Archipelago: North Frisian Islands
- Area: 0.074 km^{2} (0.029 sq mi)
- Length: 655 m (2149 ft)
- Width: 100 m (300 ft)

Administration
- Germany
- State: Schleswig-Holstein
- District: Nordfriesland
- Municipality: Gröde

Additional information
- protected

Habel (German pronunciation: [ˈhaːbl̩]; Danish: Habel, North Frisian: Haabel) is the smallest Hallig in the German Wadden Sea, and is a bird sanctuary. It is administered by the Gröde municipality on the neighbouring island. The surface area of Habel measures 7.4 hectares with about 655 metres in length, and 100 metres width.

On this island there is an artificial dwelling hill called Norderwarft with a house that hosts an ornithological observatory during the summertime. A second hill on the southern shore, Süderwarft, was abandoned in the 19th century and was then destroyed by the sea.

Habel is located in Protection Area 1 of the Schleswig Holstein Wadden Sea National Park. The common public must therefore not enter the island. The island is owned by the state of Schleswig-Holstein and is leased by Verein Jordsand, a non-profit association for environmental protection with its seat in Ahrensburg. Habel serves as breeding and resting grounds for many species of marine birds like the brant goose and the Arctic tern.
