= Pellworm (Amt) =

- Amt
- Coat of arms

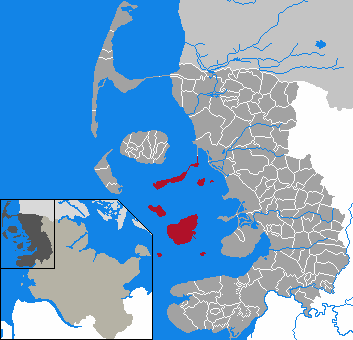
- Map of Nordfriesland highlighting Pellworm
- Interactive map of Pellworm
- Location within Germany Location within Schleswig-Holstein
- Coordinates: 54°31′N 8°39′E
- Country: Germany
- State: Schleswig-Holstein
- District: Nordfriesland
- Seat: Pellworm
- Subdivisions: 4 municipalities

Government
  - Mayor: Astrid Korth

Area
  - Total: 57.32 km^{2} (22.13 sq mi)

Population (2025-12-31)
  - Total: 1,369
  - Density: 23.88/km^{2} (61.86/sq mi)
- Time zone: UTC+01:00 (CET)
  - Summer (DST): UTC+02:00 (CEST)
- Website: www.amt-pellworm.org

Pellworm is an Amt ("collective municipality") in the district of Nordfriesland, in Schleswig-Holstein, Germany. Its seat is in Pellworm.

In 2008, the administrative community office was merged with the administration of the town of Husum, whereas the Amt remains a political entity of its own.

== Subdivision ==
The Amt Pellworm consists of the following municipalities:

1. Gröde
2. Hooge
3. Langeneß
4. Pellworm
