= Halligen =

Islands off the Danish/German coast

Native name: Halligen (German); Halliger (Danish)
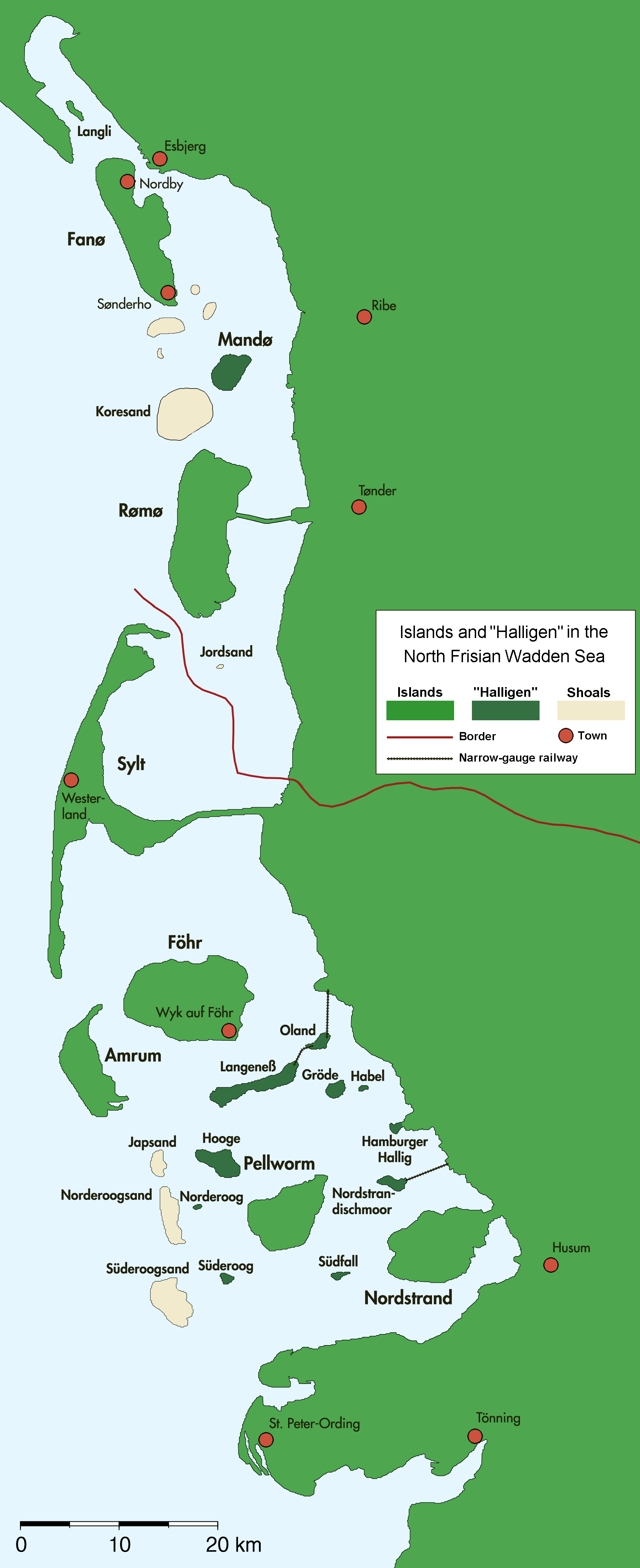
- North Frisian and Danish Wadden Sea Islands with Halligen (darker green)
- Interactive map of Halligen

Geography
- Coordinates: 54°34′N 8°39′E
- Total islands: 13

Administration
- Germany, Denmark

Demographics
- Population: about 291

The Halligen (German pronunciation: [ˈhalɪɡn̩]; singular Hallig [ˈhalɪç]) or the halliger (Danish, singular hallig) are small islands without protective dikes. They are variously pluralized in English as the Halligen, Halligs, Hallig islands, or Halligen islands. There are ten German halligen in the North Frisian Islands on Schleswig-Holstein's Wadden Sea–North Sea coast in the district of Nordfriesland and one remaining hallig at the west coast of Denmark (Langli).

== Naming ==
The name is cognate to Old-English halh, meaning "slightly raised ground isolated by marsh". The very existence of the halligen is a result of frequent floods and poor coastal protection. The floods were much more common in the Middle Ages and coastal protection was much poorer.

== Aspects ==
The halligen have areas ranging from 7 to 956 ha, and are often former parts of the mainland, separated therefrom by storm tide erosion. Some are parts of once much bigger islands sundered by the same forces. Some, owing to sediment deposition, have actually grown together to form larger ones. Langeneß (or Langeness) includes a former island by that same name, and two others that were called Nordmarsch and Butwehl.

Dwellings and commercial buildings are built upon metre-high, man-made mounds, called Warften in German or Værft in Danish, to guard against storm tides. Some halligen also have overflow dikes.

Not very many people live on the halligen. Their livelihoods are mainly based on tourism, coastal protection, and agriculture. This last activity mainly involves raising cattle in the fertile, often flooded, salt meadows.

The halligen are to be found in the Schleswig-Holsteinisches Wattenmeer National Park. The commercially developed halligen of Nordstrandischmoor, Gröde, Oland, Langeneß, and Hooge are surrounded by the protected area, but not an integral part of it. The smaller halligen, Habel, Südfall, Süderoog, and Norderoog as well as the Hamburger Hallig are parts of the national park. Walks on the tidal flats and informational meetings are offered by tourist boards and the park administration.

In the west the German halligen are protected from the open sea by the North Frisian Barrier Island.

== Gallery ==
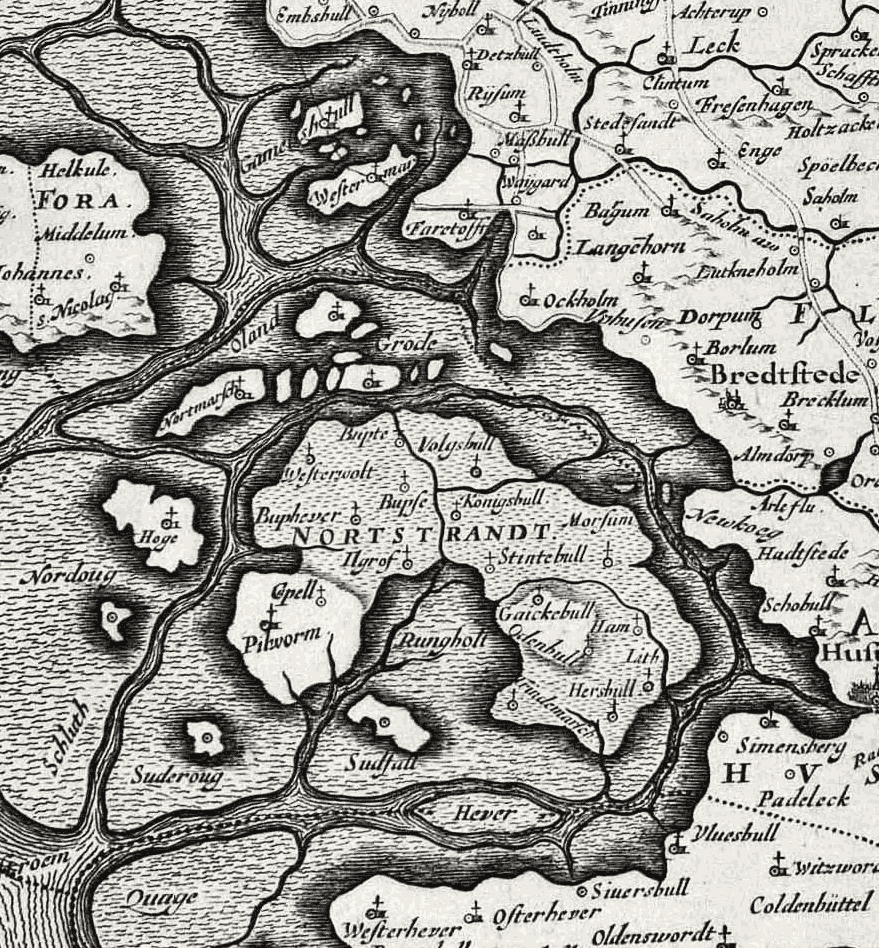
The Halligen area around 1650 on a map by Johannes Mejer

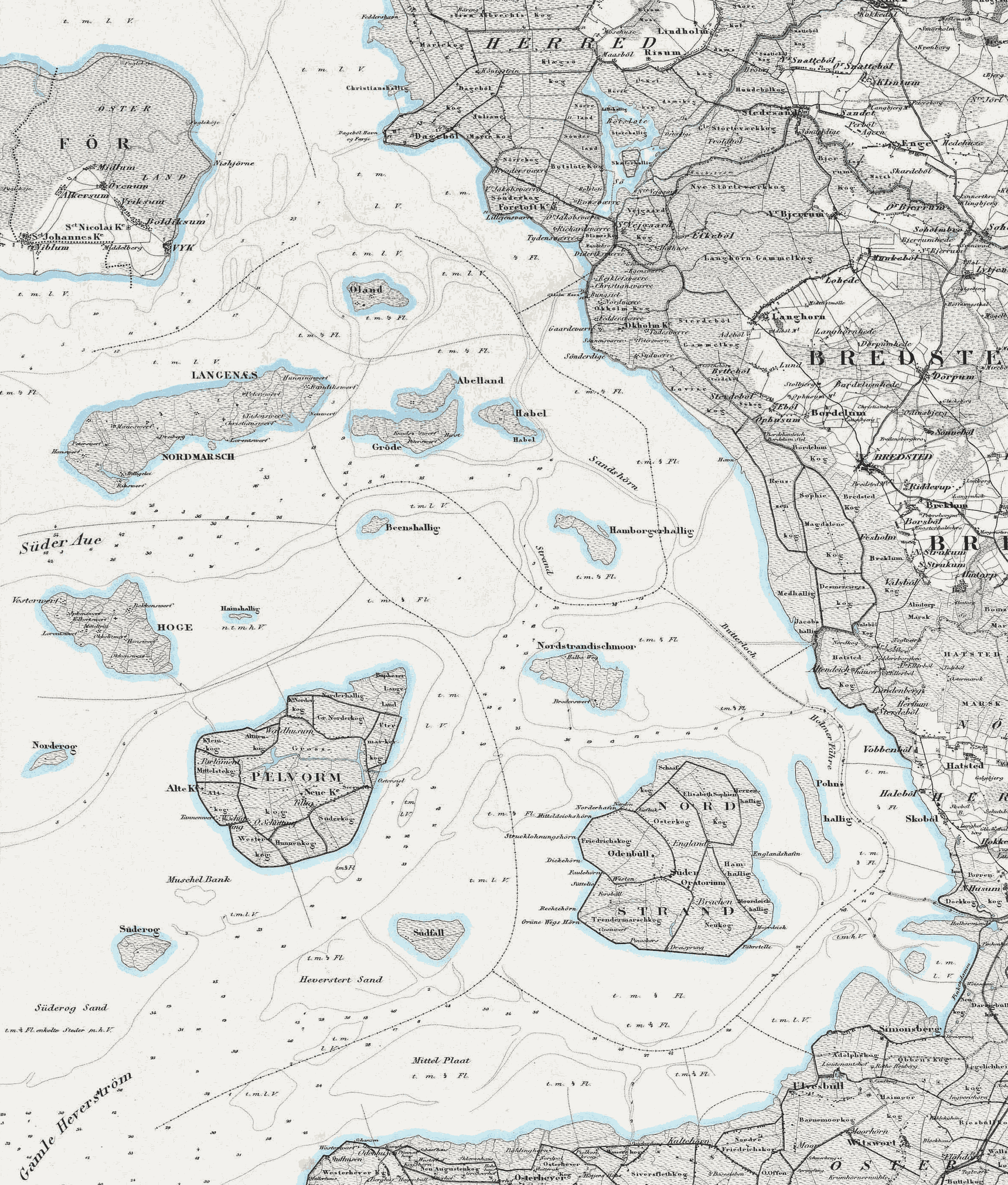
The North Frisian Halligen area around 1850, showing changes

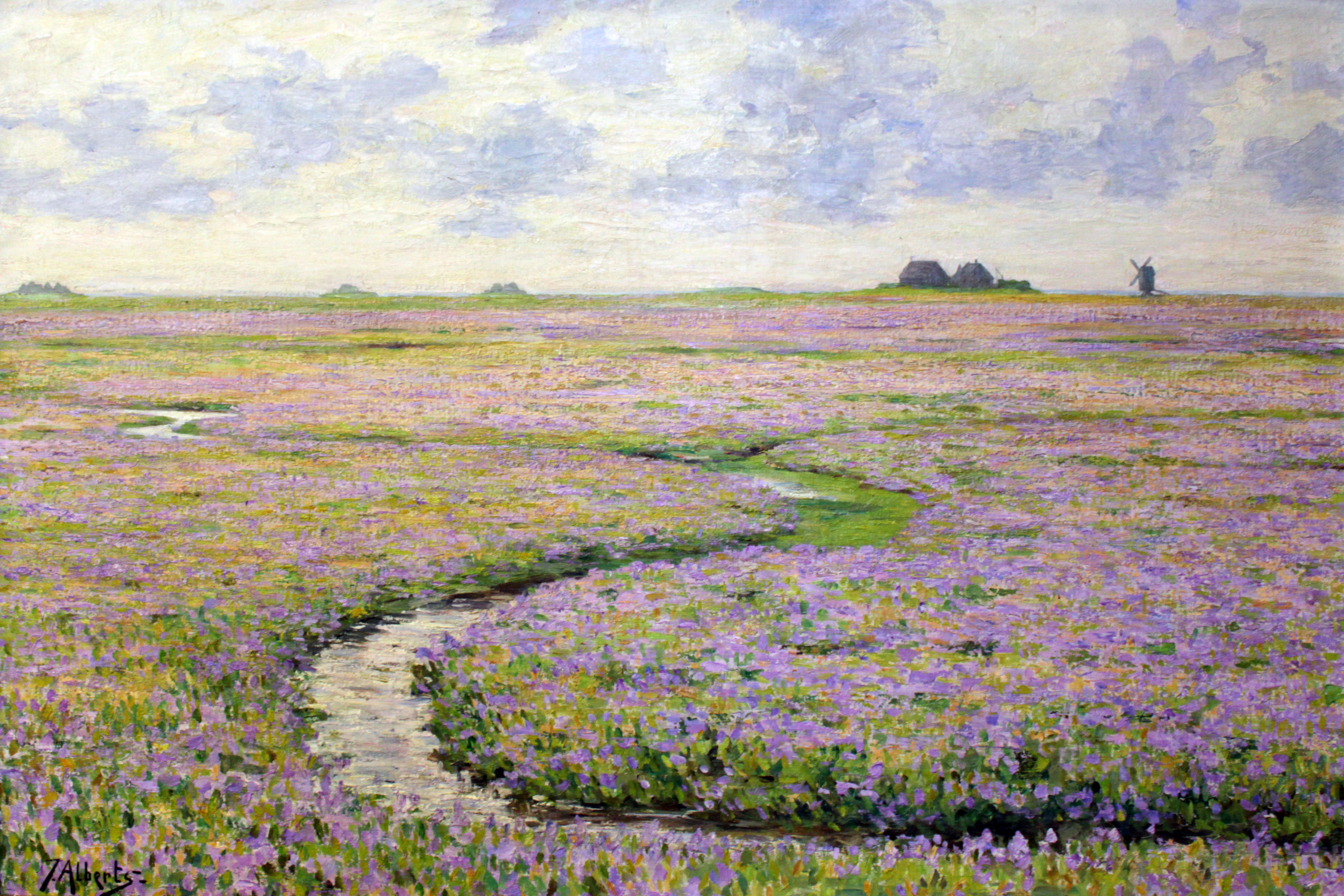
A hallig: the salt meadow in bloom

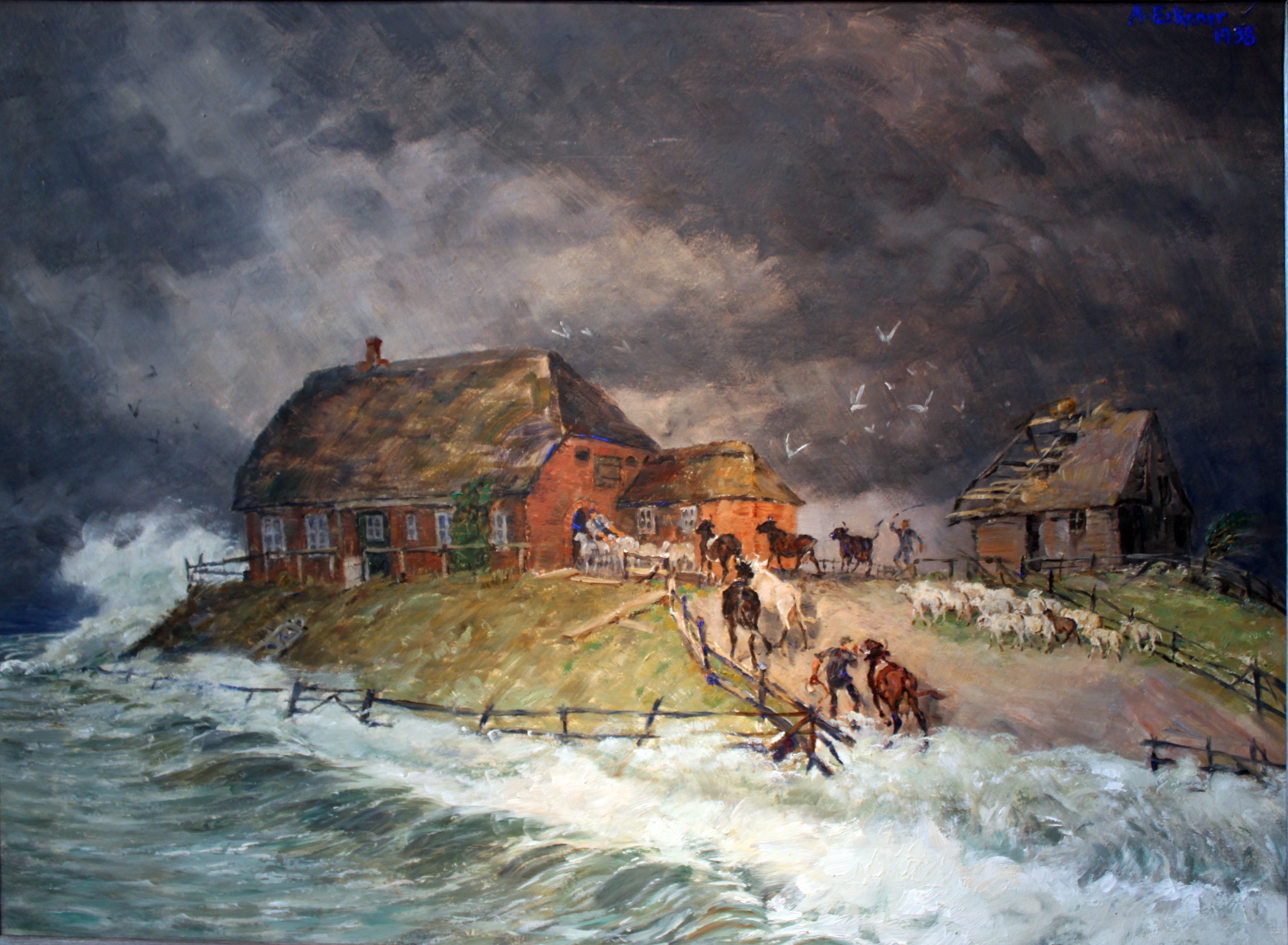
Alexander Eckener: Warft of a Hallig during a storm tide, 1906

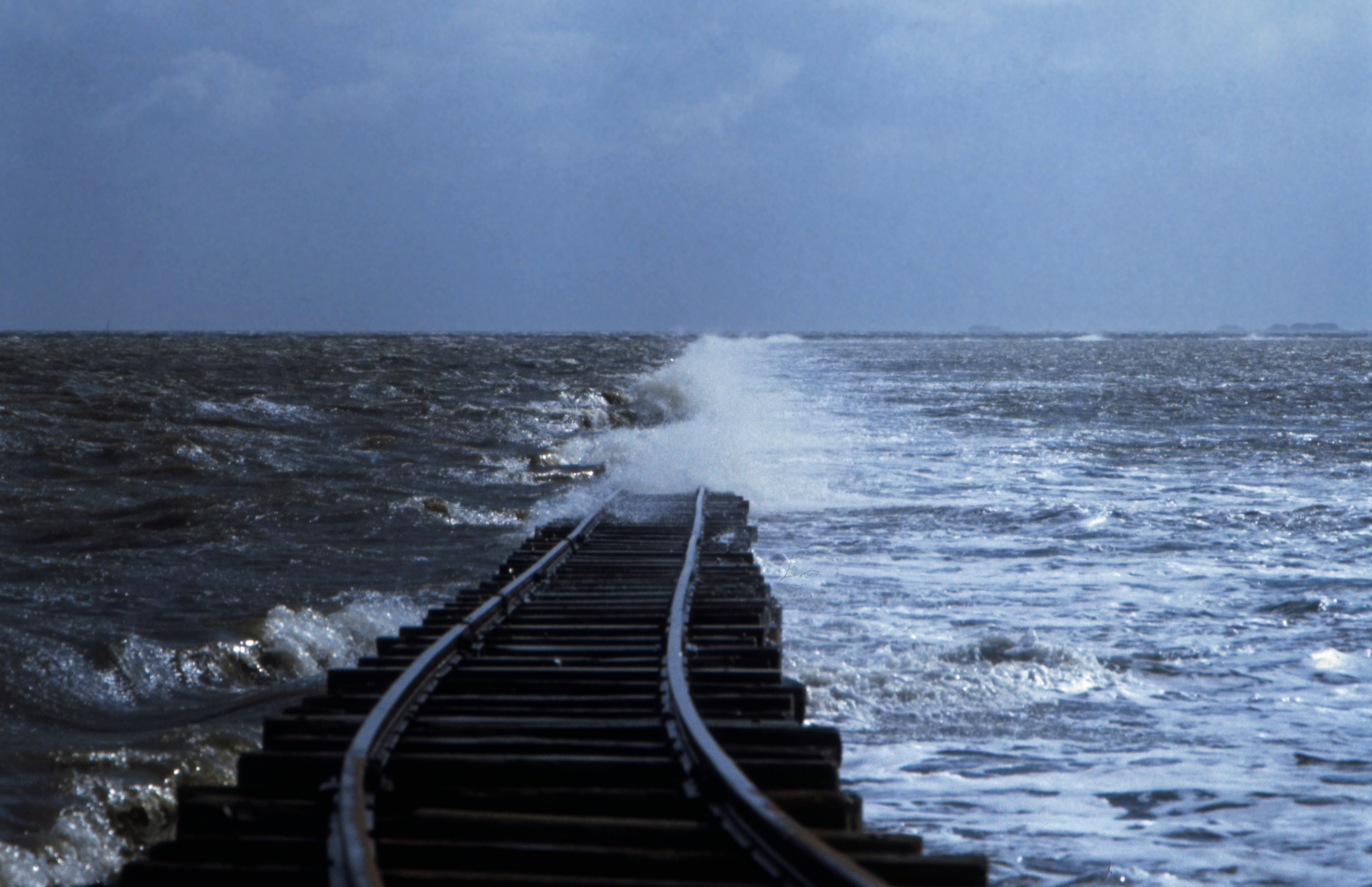
Dagebüll hallig railway, flooded, in 1984

== List of Halligen ==
Currently, there are 10 halligen in Germany. The following list does not include formerly existing Halligen that have either vanished or merged with current halligen or the mainland:

- Langeneß – 956 ha, 16 Warften, about 110 inhabitants. Narrow gauge railway connection to Oland (over causeway).
- Hooge – 574 ha, 10 Warften, about 120 inhabitants.
- Gröde – 277 ha, 2 Warften, 11 inhabitants.
- Nordstrandischmoor; 175 ha, 4 Warften, 18 inhabitants. One-room schoolhouse. Narrow gauge railway connection to mainland.
- Oland – 96 ha, 1 Warft, about 30 inhabitants. Narrow gauge railway connection to mainland and Langeneß.
- Süderoog – 60 ha, 1 Warft, 2 inhabitants.
- Südfall – 50 ha, 1 Warft, bird sanctuary.
- Hamburger Hallig – 50 ha, 2 Warften, uninhabited, inn occupied in summer, joined to the mainland by a 4 km-long causeway and a polder.
- Norderoog – 9 ha, no Warften, bird sanctuary tended year-round.
- Habel – 3.6 ha, 1 Warft, uninhabited, bird sanctuary occupied in summer.

On the Danish side, one still exists:

- Langli

Also Danish Mandø used to be a hallig, but it has dikes today. The German peninsula and former island of Großer Werder on the Baltic Sea coast is also nicknamed "Baltic Hallig" (Ostsee-Hallig) due to its remote situation and appearance.

== See also ==
- List of islands of Denmark
- List of islands of Germany
- Tidal island
- Uthlande
