= North Frisian Islands =

Islands in Germany

Coordinates: 54°55′N 8°20′E

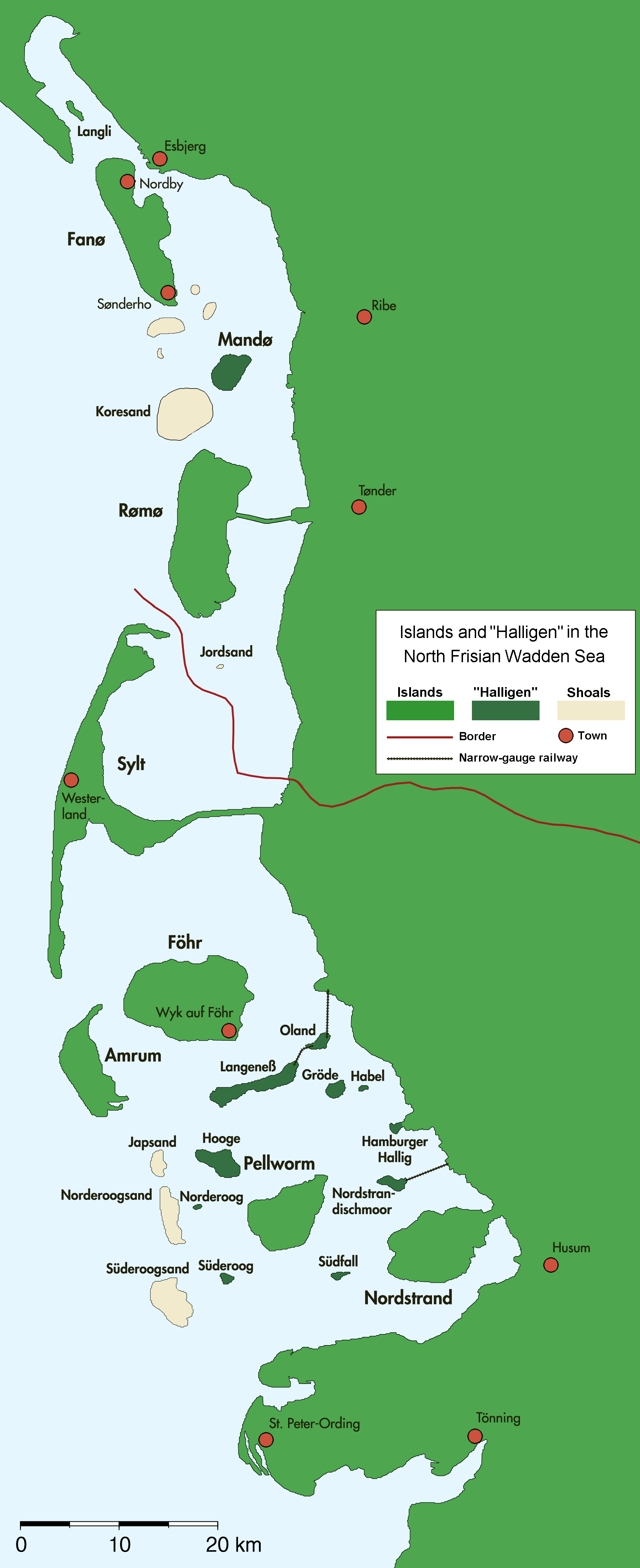
- Map of the North Frisian and the Danish Wadden Sea Islands

Geography
- Location: North Sea
- Total islands: 13
- Major islands: Sylt, Föhr, Amrum, Pellworm

Administration
- Germany
- State: Schleswig-Holstein
- District: Nordfriesland

Demographics
- Ethnic groups: Germans, Frisians, Danes

The North Frisian Islands (German: Nordfriesische Inseln, pronounced [ˈnɔʁtˌfʁiːzɪʃə ˈɪnzl̩n]; Öömrang and Fering North Frisian: Nuurdfresk Eilunen; Söl'ring North Frisian: Nuurđfriisk Ailönen; Danish: Nordfrisiske Øer) are the Frisian Islands off the coast of North Frisia.

The term covers both the North Frisian Islands in the narrow sense (in Schleswig-Holstein, Germany) and the Danish Wadden Sea Islands (in Denmark). However, culturally and linguistically, the Danish islands are usually not reckoned as being part of North Frisia, since they are not inhabited by native speakers of the North Frisian language. Occasionally, the remote island of Heligoland is also included in this group for reasons of administrative convenience, despite not being located in the Wadden Sea, since the island is home to its own unique dialect of Frisian.

== History ==
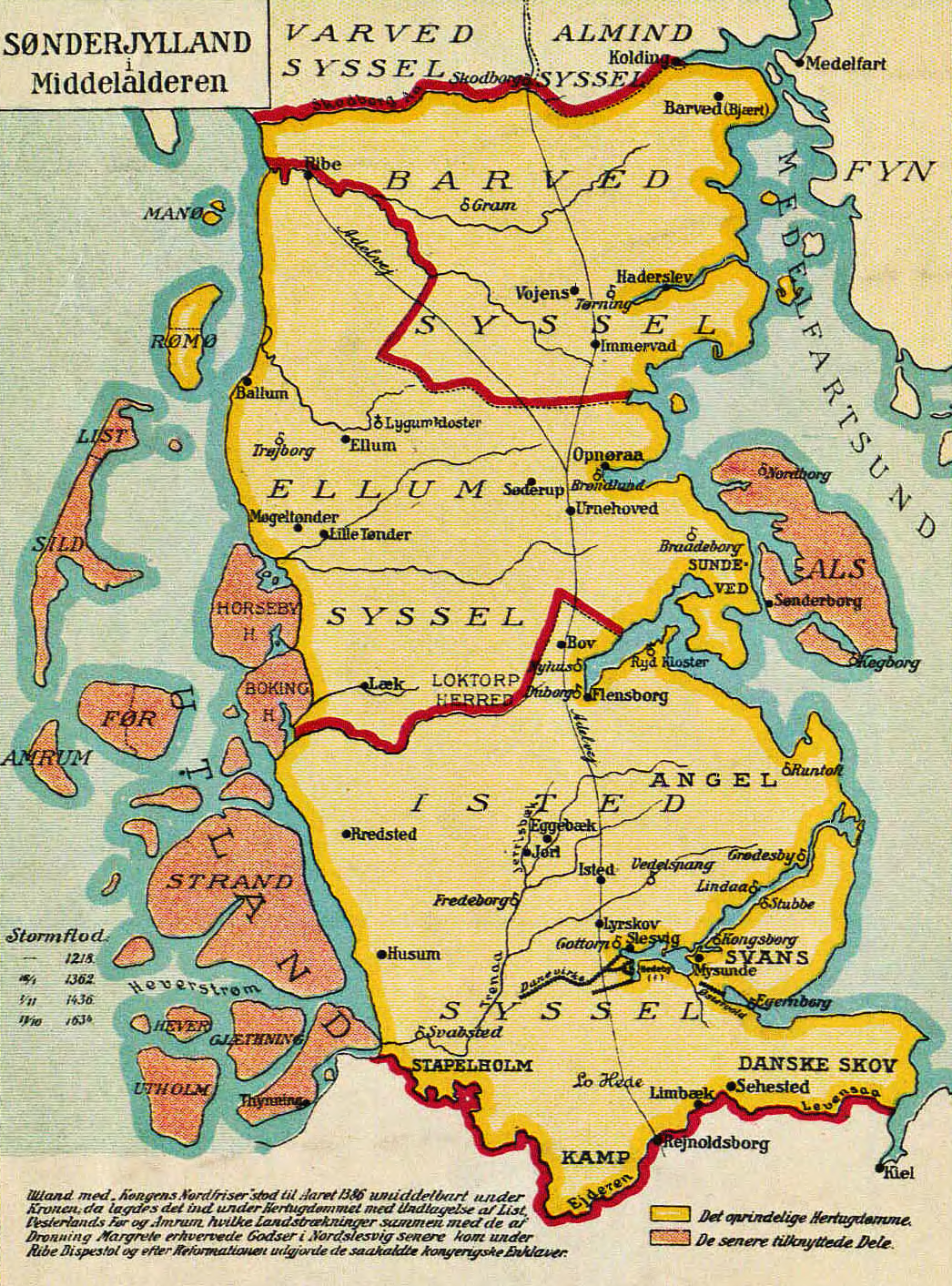
During the Nordic Middle Ages, the mainland part of Schleswig was divided into three sýslur, viz. Barved, Ellum and Isted. The North Frisian Islands were known as Utlande.

After the Frisian and Danish colonisation of the islands in the 8th century, the Frisian-populated hundreds (between Eiderstedt and Sylt) became the Uthlande. The North Frisians in the Uthlande were ruled directly by the Danish king and were known as Königsfriesen or "King's Frisians". Only later did the Uthlande transfer to the Duchy of Schleswig, with the exception of small Danish royal enclaves. Part of Rømø was also ruled by the Schleswig duke. After the German-Danish wars, the islands from Nordstrand to Rømø became Prussian in 1866. After the referendum in 1920, the current border between the islands of Sylt and Rømø was fixed.

A good and thorough overview of the life, work, languages, costumes and customs of the island Frisians is portrayed by the Carl Haeberlin Frisian Museum in Wyk auf Föhr.

== Islands ==
There are four larger islands and ten tiny islets. The names of the large islands are Sylt, Föhr, Amrum, and Pellworm. The islets are called Halligen. In medieval times, the present-day peninsula Nordstrand and Pellworm as well as the Halligen were part of the large island of Strand. This island was torn to pieces in a disastrous storm tide in 1634.

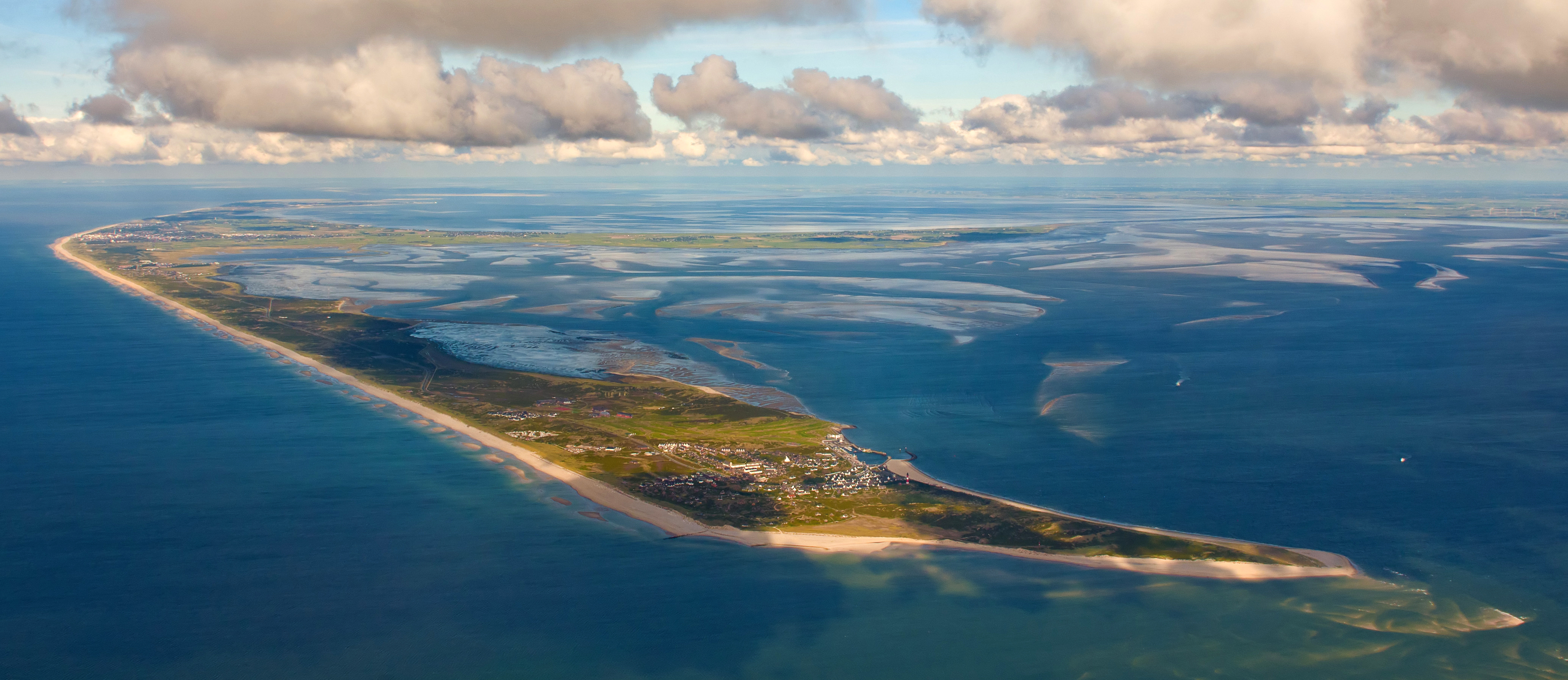
Sylt

Sylt (Söl'ring North Frisian: Söl' ; Danish: Sild) is the largest of the North Frisian Islands, consisting of about 100 km². It is accessible by a causeway called the Hindenburgdamm; this causeway is only accessible to trains. In the summer months, the island is crowded with tourists, including those who have a preference for nudism. Sylt's image is that of a meeting point for the jet-set. The main town on the island is Westerland. The northern end of Sylt, the Ellenbogen ("elbow"), is Germany's northernmost point. Lager Sylt, the Nazi concentration camp on Alderney, was named after the island.

Compared with Sylt, Föhr (Fering North Frisian: Feer; Danish: Før) is a relatively silent island. Its area is 82 km². Sixteen old hamlets are scattered over the island, some of which already existed in the 13th century. The main town is Wyk on the south eastern shore. Wyk is a popular German seaside resort. There is no bridge or causeway connecting Föhr and the mainland, so ferries are the only connection. The ferry port, the harbour and Föhr marina are in Wyk.

Amrum (Öömrang North Frisian: Oomram) is only 20 km², but it is popular with tourists, though less crowded than Sylt. The western half of the island features a beach 12 km in length and 1 km in width. The villages are situated on the eastern shore, with Wittdün being the most important of them.

Pellworm (North Frisian Polweerm; Mooring North Frisian: Pälweerm; Danish: Pelvorm) and the peninsula of Nordstrand (Mooring: Nordströön) are the remains of the submerged island of Strand. The main town of this sunken island was Rungholt, thought to be the largest town in the surrounding area, but it was totally destroyed and submerged by a storm in 1362, 272 years before another storm destroyed Strand itself. Nordstrand has an area of 49 km², Pellworm 37 km².

Smaller remains of Strand are the ten islets called Halligen. The houses on these tiny islets are built on artificial hills. In a storm tide only these hills rise above the sea, while the remainder of the islet is flooded. The names of the Halligen are Nordmarsch-Langeness, Norderoog, Süderoog, Nordstrandischmoor, Oland, Südfall, Gröde-Appelland, Hooge, Habel and the Hamburger Hallig.

West off the Halligen, three drying sandbanks form the so-called North Frisian Barrier Islands: Japsand, Norderoogsand and Süderoogsand.

== See also ==
- Frisia
- German Bight
- List of islands of Denmark
- List of islands of Germany
