= Nordstrandischmoor =

Hallig in the Wadden Sea - a tidal island

Nordstrandischmoor Lätj Möör / Nordstrand Mor / Nordstrandmose
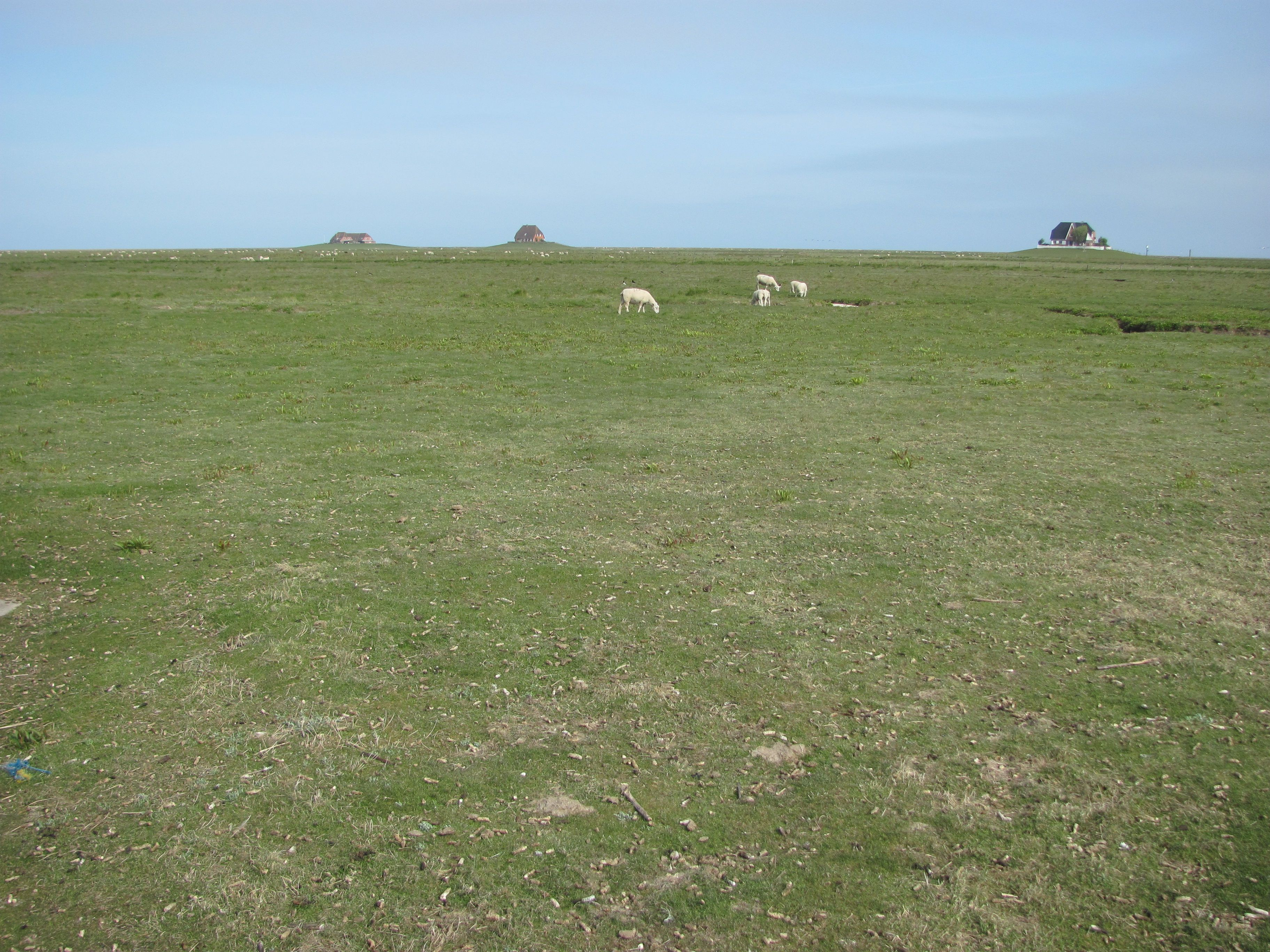
- The Hallig of Nordstrandischmoor including, from left to right, Norderwarft, Halberwegwarft and Schulwarft (Amalienwarft)
- Interactive map of Nordstrandischmoor; Lätj Möör / Nordstrand Mor / Nordstrandmose

Geography
- Location: German Bight, North Sea
- Coordinates: 54°32′59″N 08°48′44″E
- Archipelago: North Frisian Islands
- Area: 1.9 km^{2} (0.73 sq mi)
- Length: 2.6 km (1.62 mi)
- Width: 0.8 km (0.5 mi)
- Highest elevation: 3 m (10 ft)
- Highest point: Neuwarft

Administration
- Germany
- Largest settlement: Neuwarft

Demographics
- Population: 22 (1987)

Nordstrandischmoor (German pronunciation: [ˈnɔʁtʃtʁandɪʃˌmoːɐ̯]; Danish: Nordstrand Mor or Nordstrandmose, North Frisian: Lätj Möör; also known locally as Lüttmoor) is a Hallig (undyked islet) off the North Frisian coast in Germany and lies within the Schleswig-Holstein Wadden Sea National Park.

== Geography ==
Administratively, Nordstrandischmoor belongs to the municipality of Nordstrand and is one of its parishes. The Hallig has an area of 1.9 km^{2}. In the spring of 2008, 27 people lived on Nordstrandischmoor.

Its link with the mainland is the Lüttmoorsiel-Nordstrandischmoor island railway a construction railway with a rail gauge of 600 mm, which runs to the mainland at Beltringharder Koog in the municipality of Reußenköge. At high tide, ships can also dock. At low tide the Hallig may also be reached on foot over the mudflats.

On the island, there are four warfs, artificial dwelling mounds on which are located a primary school (with 3 students, the smallest school in Germany - as at 2010) and a restaurant. The house on Halberwegwarft was demolished. At present (2026), Halberwegwarft is uninhabited. The four warfs, from east to west are:

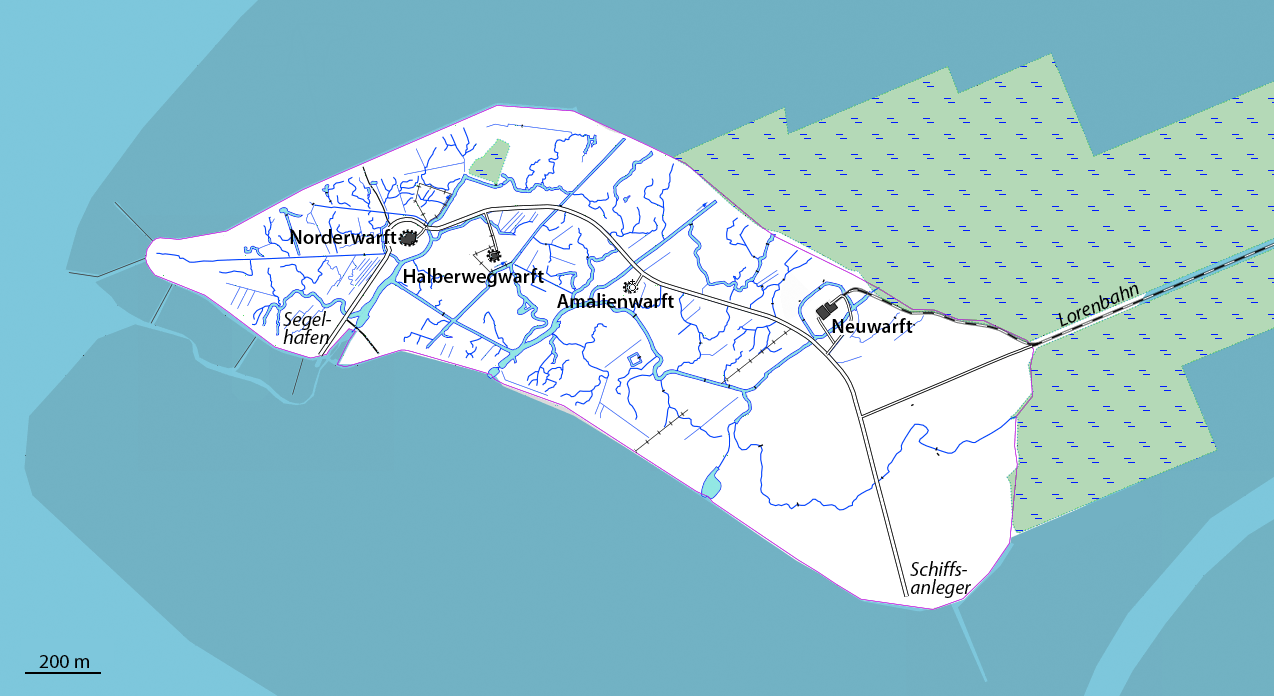
Map of Nordstrandischmoor with the warfs numbered. Right: the Lorendamm embankment at Beltringharder Koog
Residence No.^{1}	Warf	Topographic description	Population details 30.06.2005
Residence No.^{1}	Warf	Topographic description	Population	Households
1	Neuwarft^{2}	(Hamlet)	14	2
2	Amalienwarft^{3}	(School/church)	-	-
3	Halberwegwarft	(House)	1	1
4	Norderwarft	(House)	7	1
	Nordstrandischmoor	Hallig	22	4

== Gallery ==
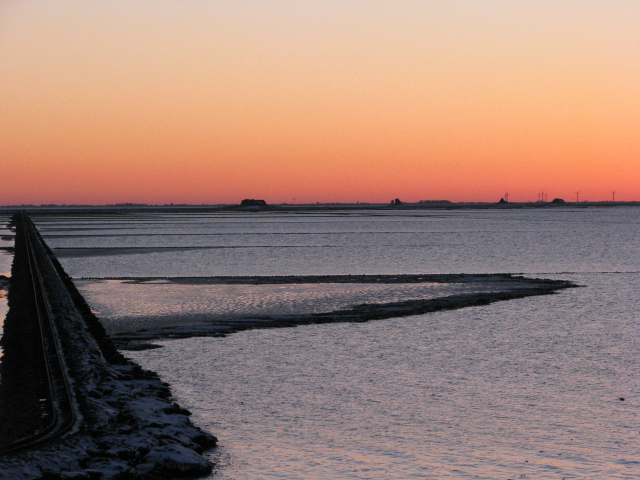
Evening view of the islet with its four wharfs and the Lorendamm, seen from the mainland

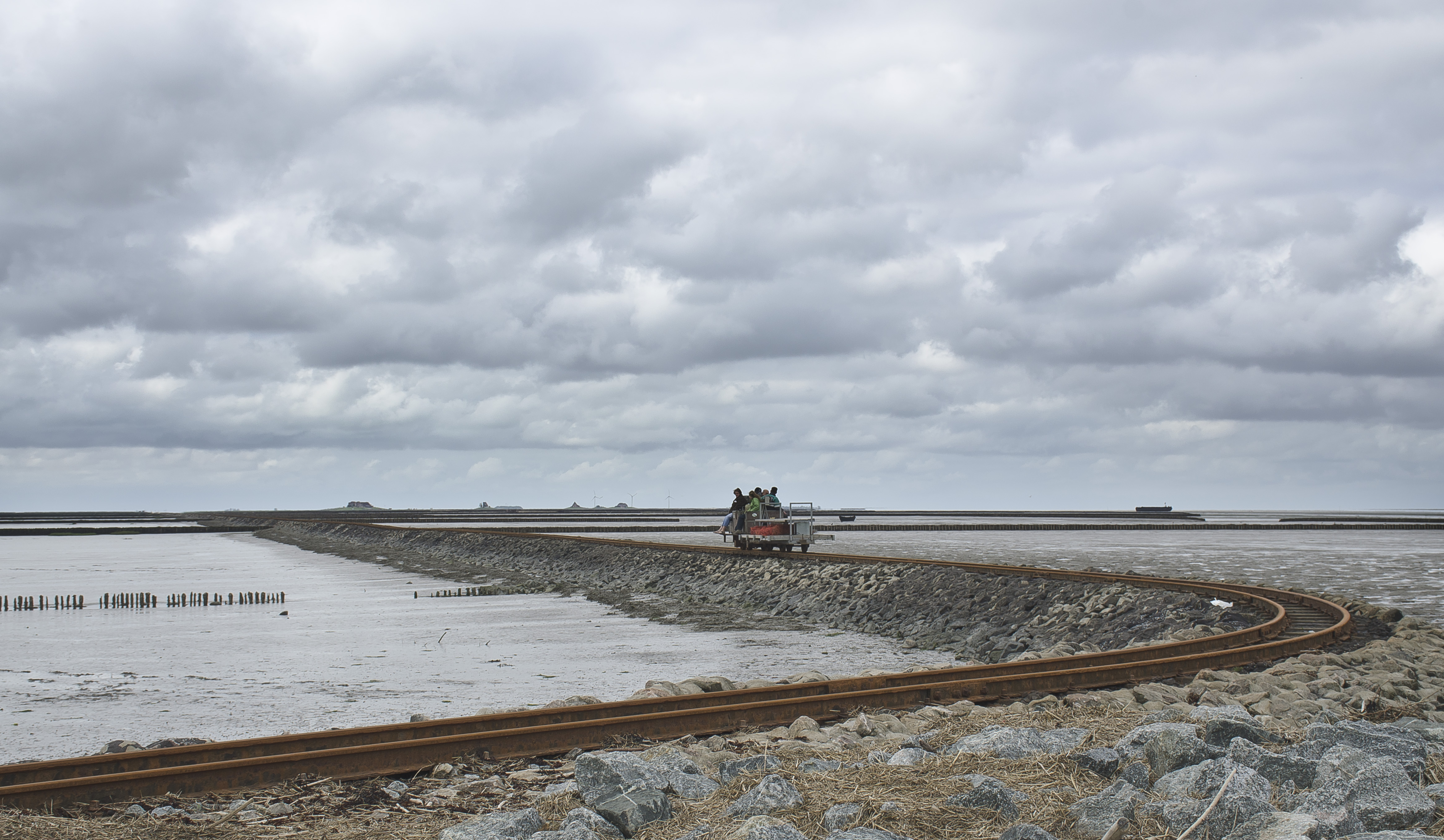
Railway line to Nordstrandischmoor

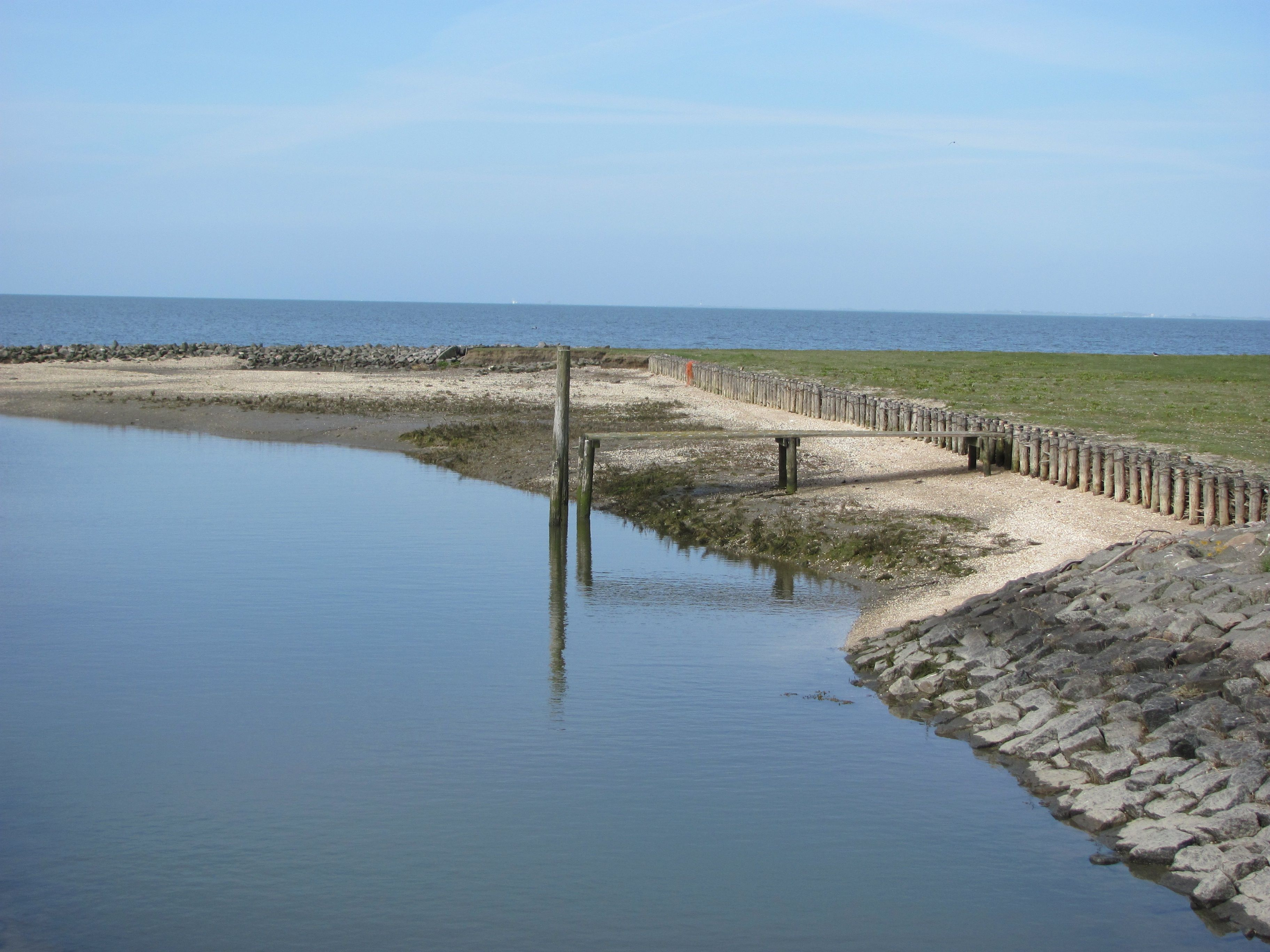
Beach

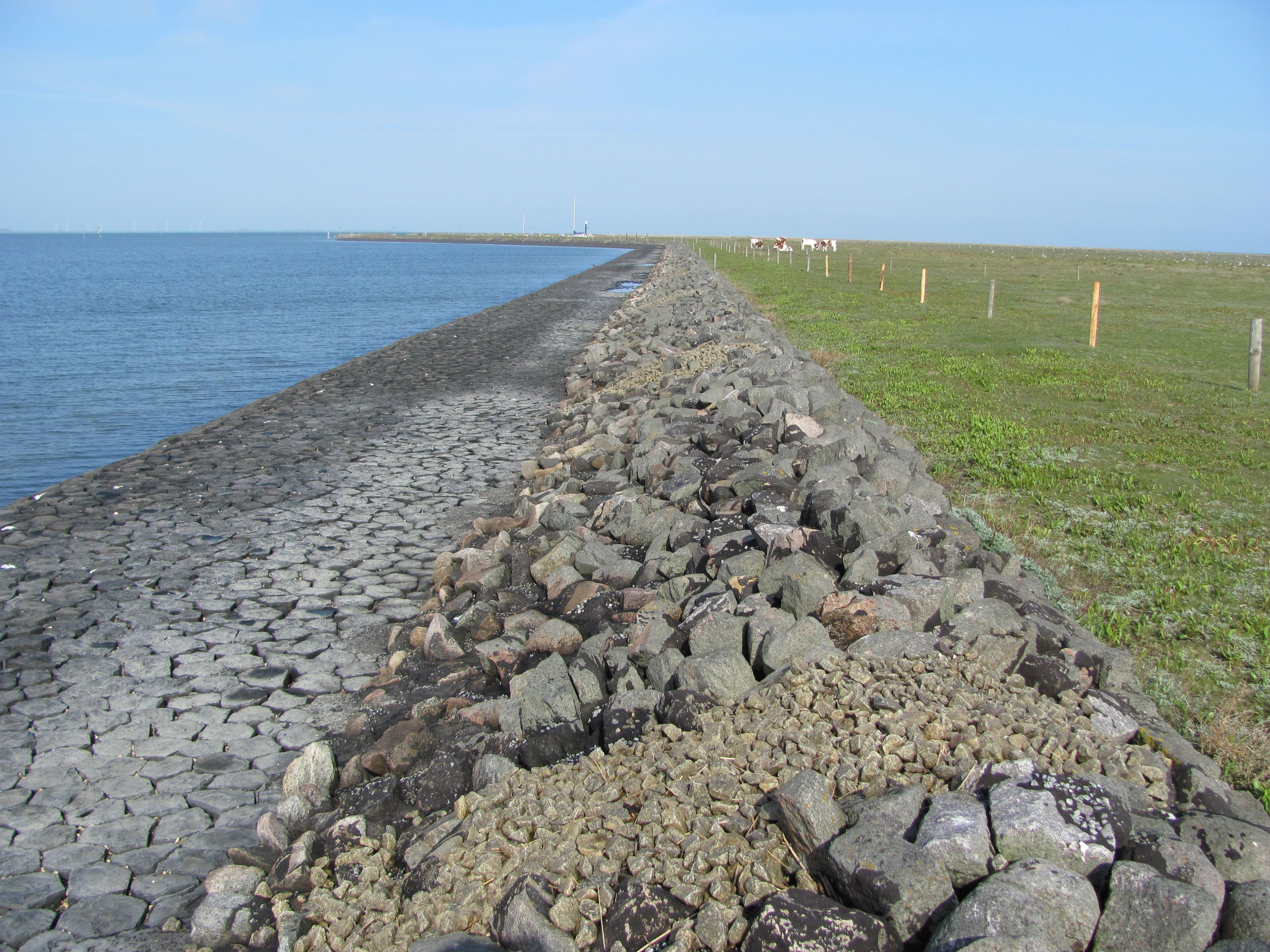
Coastal defences

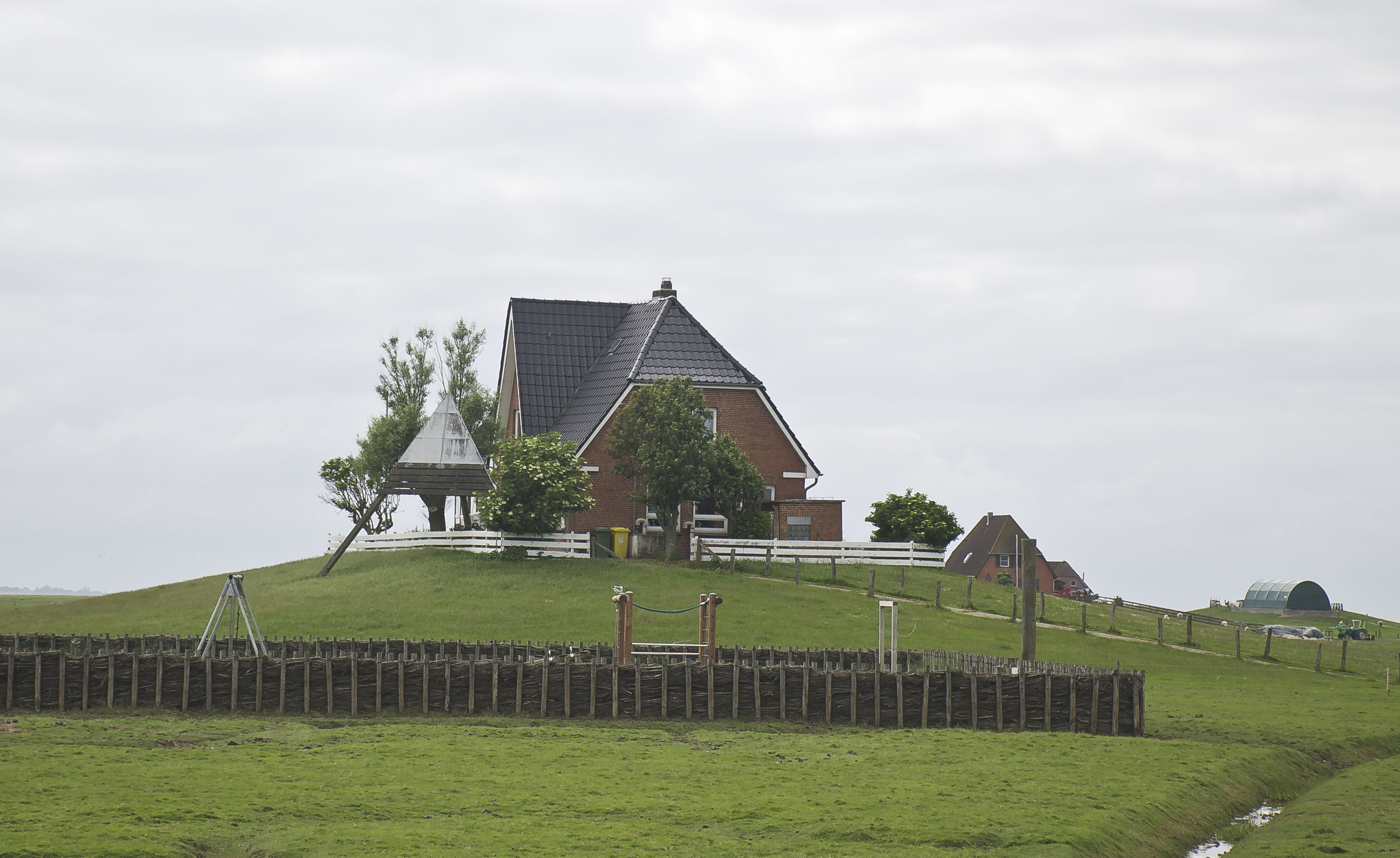
Schulwarft, featuring one of Germany's smallest schools

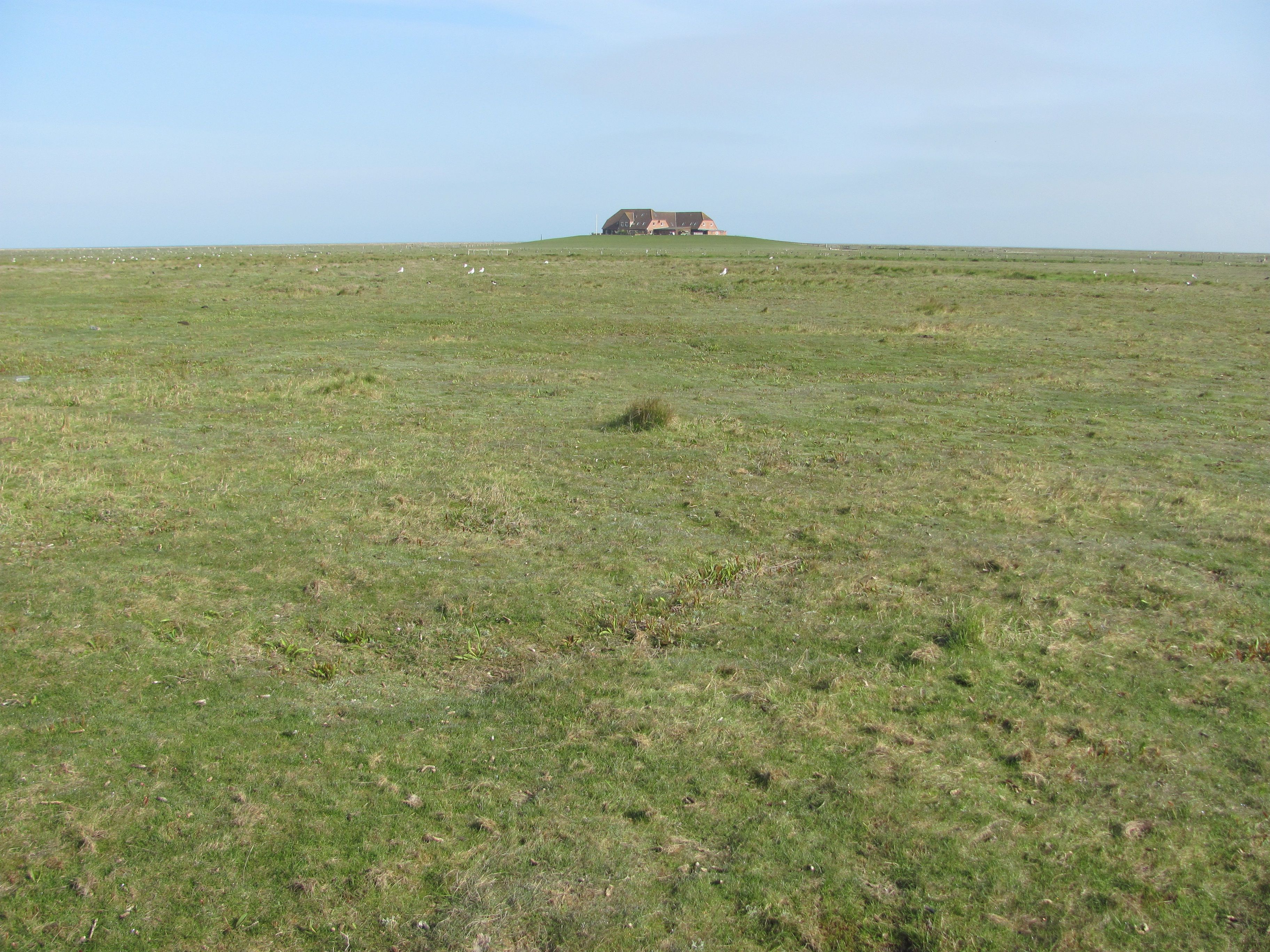
Norderwarft

Neuwarft

Cemetery

General view 2026

Ferry terminal
