= Südfall =

Südfall Sydfald
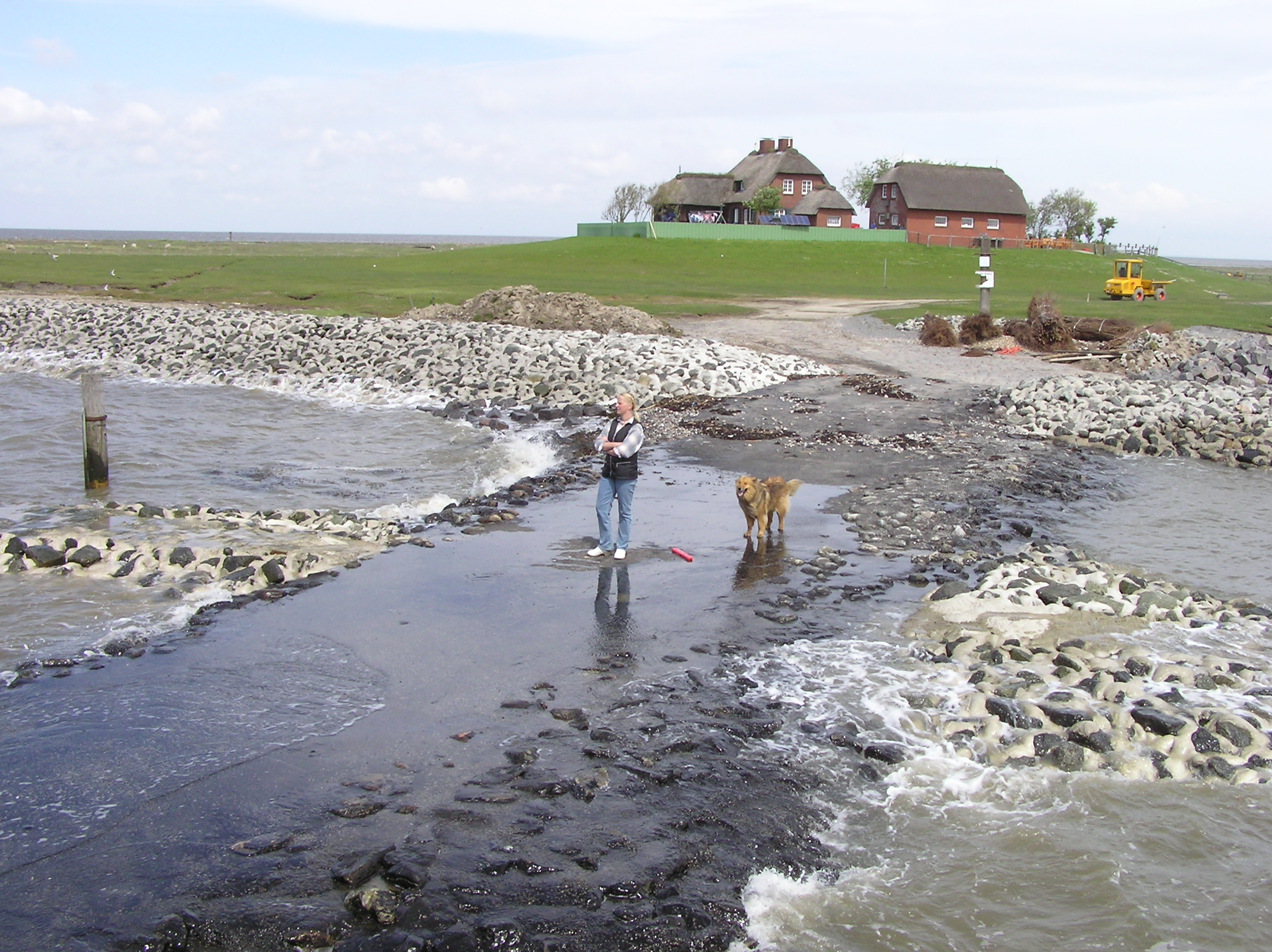
- Interactive map of Südfall; Sydfald

Geography
- Location: Wadden Sea
- Coordinates: 54°27′55″N 08°43′35″E
- Archipelago: North Frisian Islands
- Area: 56 ha (140 acres)
- Length: 1,200 m (3900 ft)
- Width: 640 m (2100 ft)
- Highest elevation: 3 m (10 ft)

Administration
- Germany
- State: Schleswig-Holstein
- District: Nordfriesland

Demographics
- Population: 2

Südfall (German pronunciation: [ˈzyːtfal]; Danish: Sydfald) is a small island in the Wadden Sea off the west coast of Schleswig-Holstein, Germany, one of the ten German Hallig islands. It has a permanent population of two people. It covers an area of 0.56 square kilometres (0.22 mi^{2}) and is administratively part of Pellworm Municipality.

== History ==
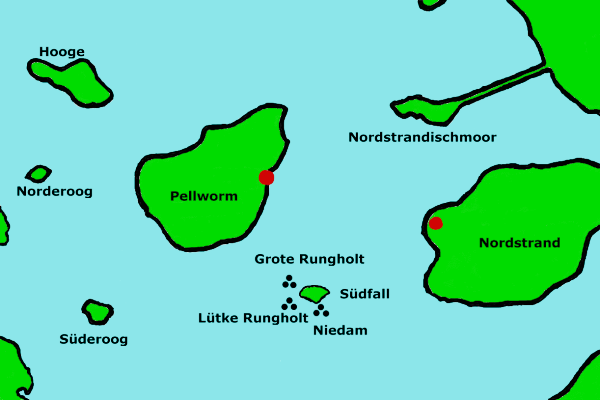
Approximate locations of several settlements, including Rungholt, on the former island of Strand near Südfall

Prior to the Grote Mandrenke flood in 1362, the area comprising the present-day island was a part of the former island of Strand in Edoms Hundred. As a result of the flood, which laid waste to much of Strand and submerged the city of Rungholt, three small islands were removed from the area of Strand: Südfall, Nübell (or "Nubel") and Nielandt. Over time, Südfall and Nübell were gradually eroded into the sea, and their inhabitants resettled on Nielandt, renaming it Südfall. In the catastrophic Burchardi flood of 1634, Strand was torn asunder by the sea and its largest settlements were destroyed, causing a great loss of life and property. Nearby Südfall, however, weathered the disaster. Its inhabitants made a living primarily by way of agriculture and fishing, supplemented by occasional beachcombing. The twelve families who lived on the island perished in the Great Hallig Flood on 3–4 February 1825. The three warfts on the western side of the island were totally submerged, and the total area of the island was halved. The single warft that remains on the island today was constructed in 1828. Ownership of the island has changed hands numerous times since then.

In 1910, the Countess Diana von Reventlow-Criminil purchased the island to spend her retirement years on it. After this, the Dethleffsen family rented out the island for a 50-year term. In 1921, Andreas Busch from Nordstrand discovered remnants of canal locks in the intertidal zone (German: Watt) around Südfall. He mapped the area and discovered numerous traces of the area's former inhabitants, such as wells, fields, paths, and graves. Based on these findings, it was determined that Rungholt was situated near present-day Südfall prior to its destruction in 1362. Since 1960, the number of times per year that the island has flooded has increased from around 30 to nearly 70.

== Modern times ==
Today, Südfall is part of the German state of Schleswig-Holstein. Since 1957, the environmental group Verein Jordsand has served as the island's caretaker. It was granted official environmental protection in 1959, and is now part of the Schleswig-Holstein Wadden Sea National Park, which is in turn part of the larger Wadden Sea UNESCO World Heritage Site.

One house, inhabited by a water-warden and his wife, and several surrounding buildings are situated on the lone wharf on the island. A bird-conservation station and a watchpost/radio station of the German Maritime Search and Rescue Service (German: Deutsche Gesellschaft zur Rettung Schiffbrüchiger) are maintained on the island.

== Transportation ==
With permission from the National Park Service, Südfall is reachable from Nordstrand at low tide by foot or on horseback over the intertidal zone. In the summertime, the island is visited thrice per week by a ship from Pellworm. As Südfall is in the First Protection Zone (German: Schutzzone 1) of the Schleswig-Holstein Wadden Sea National Park, accessing the island is otherwise prohibited.

== Nature ==
The island has one main tidal creek (German: Priel), which flows from the western portion of the island to a wide mouth on the eastern shore, emptying into the Wadden Sea. The salt marshes on the island have lain ungrazed for many years, leading to the rebounding of marshplants such as Armeria maritima (German: Strand-Grasnelke), Artemisia maritima (German: Strand-Beifuß), Limonium vulgare (German: Gewöhnlicher Strandflieder), and Aster tripolium (German: Strand-Aster).

The intertidal zone around Südfall is protected from dredging to prevent the damage or destruction of cultural traces and artifacts.

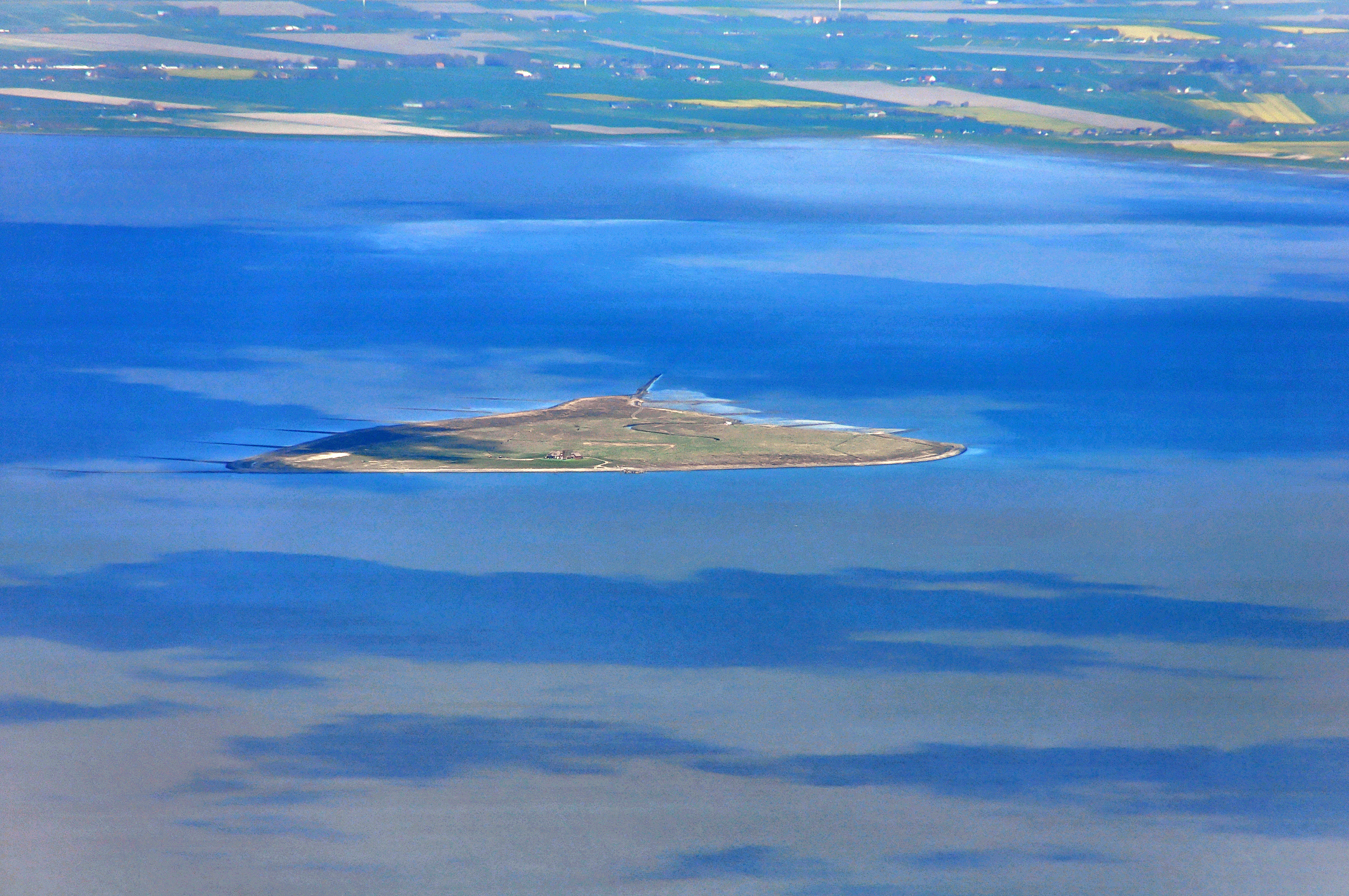
Südfall

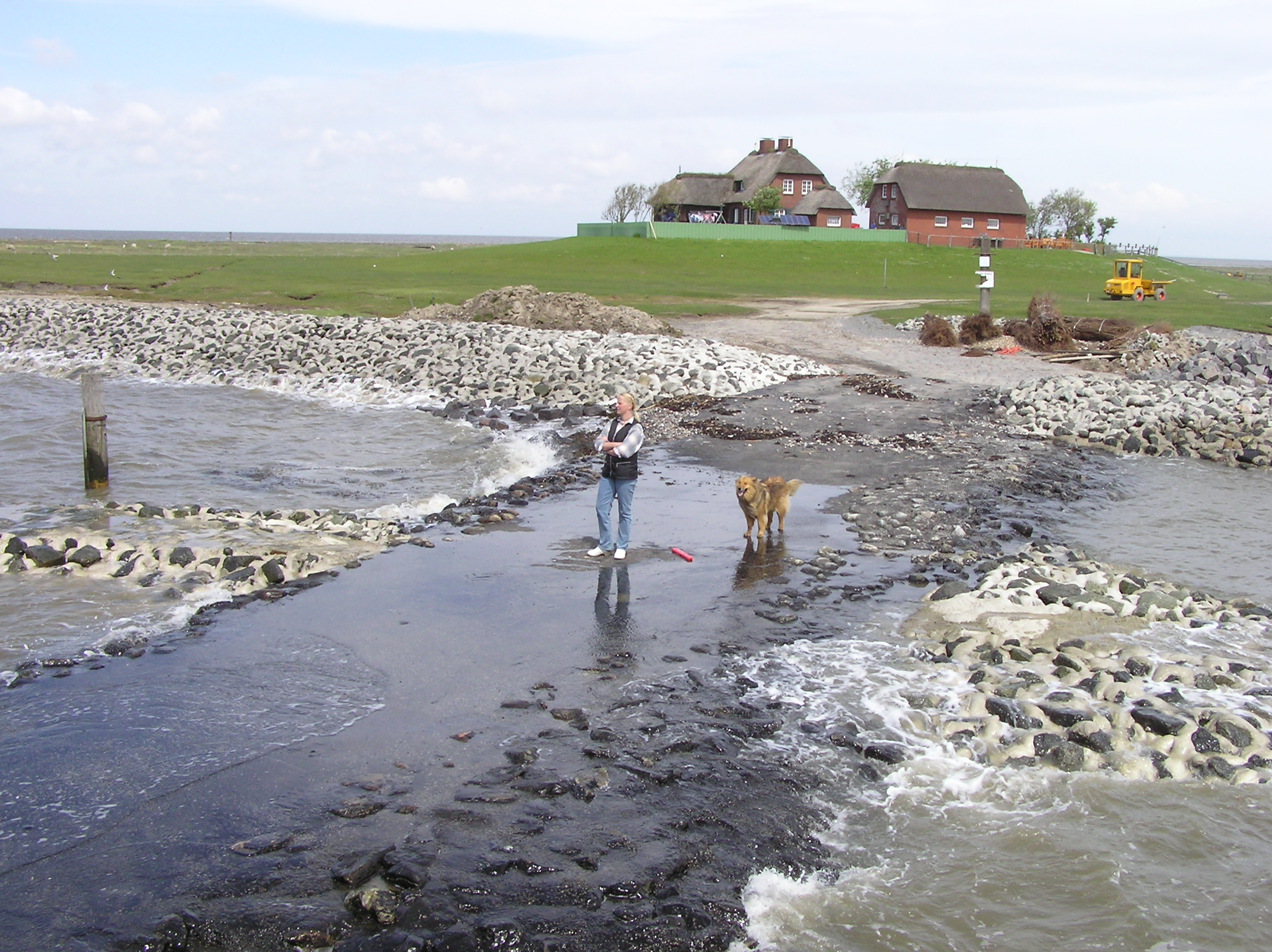
View of the warft and its buildings

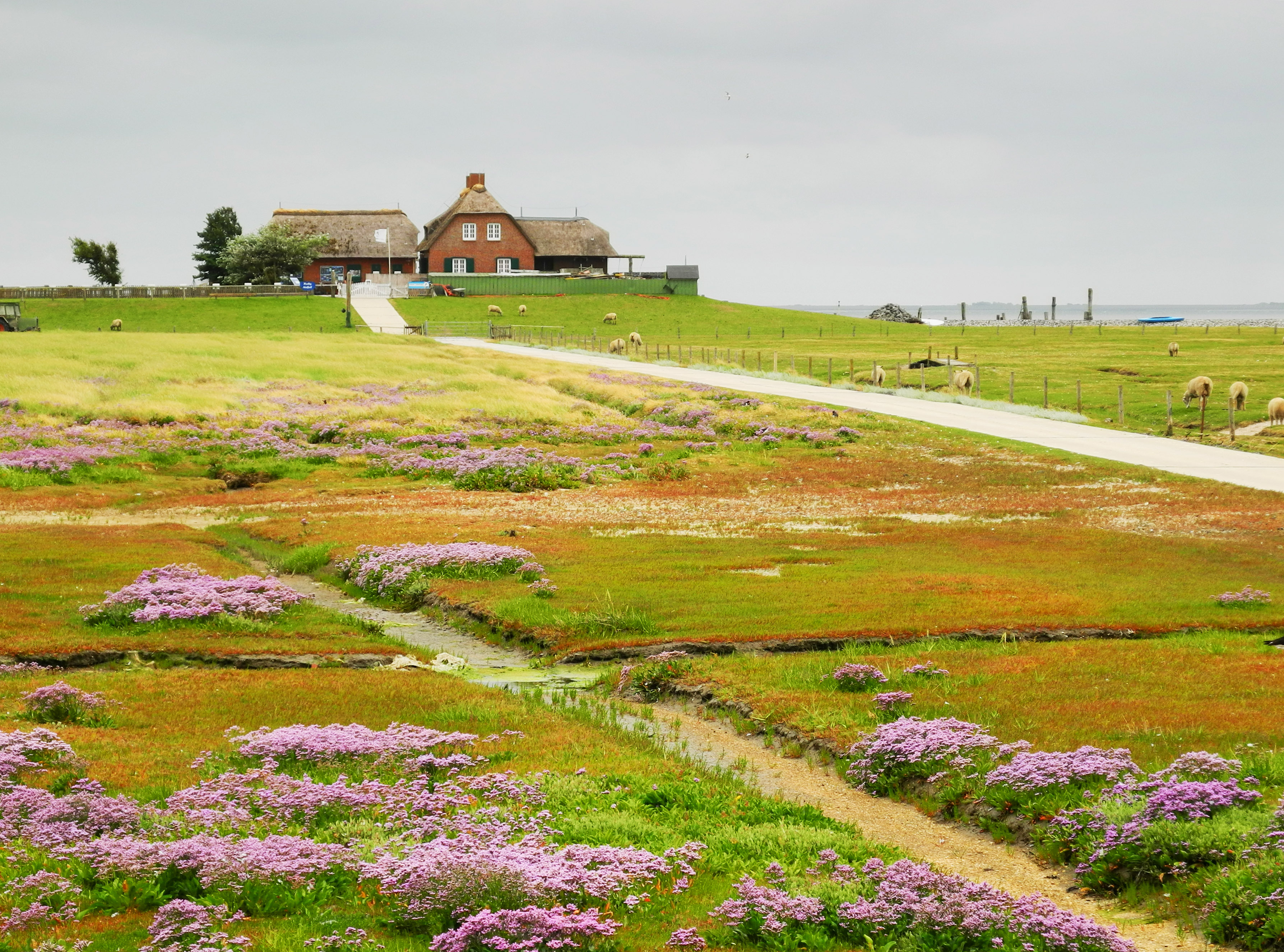
Südfall

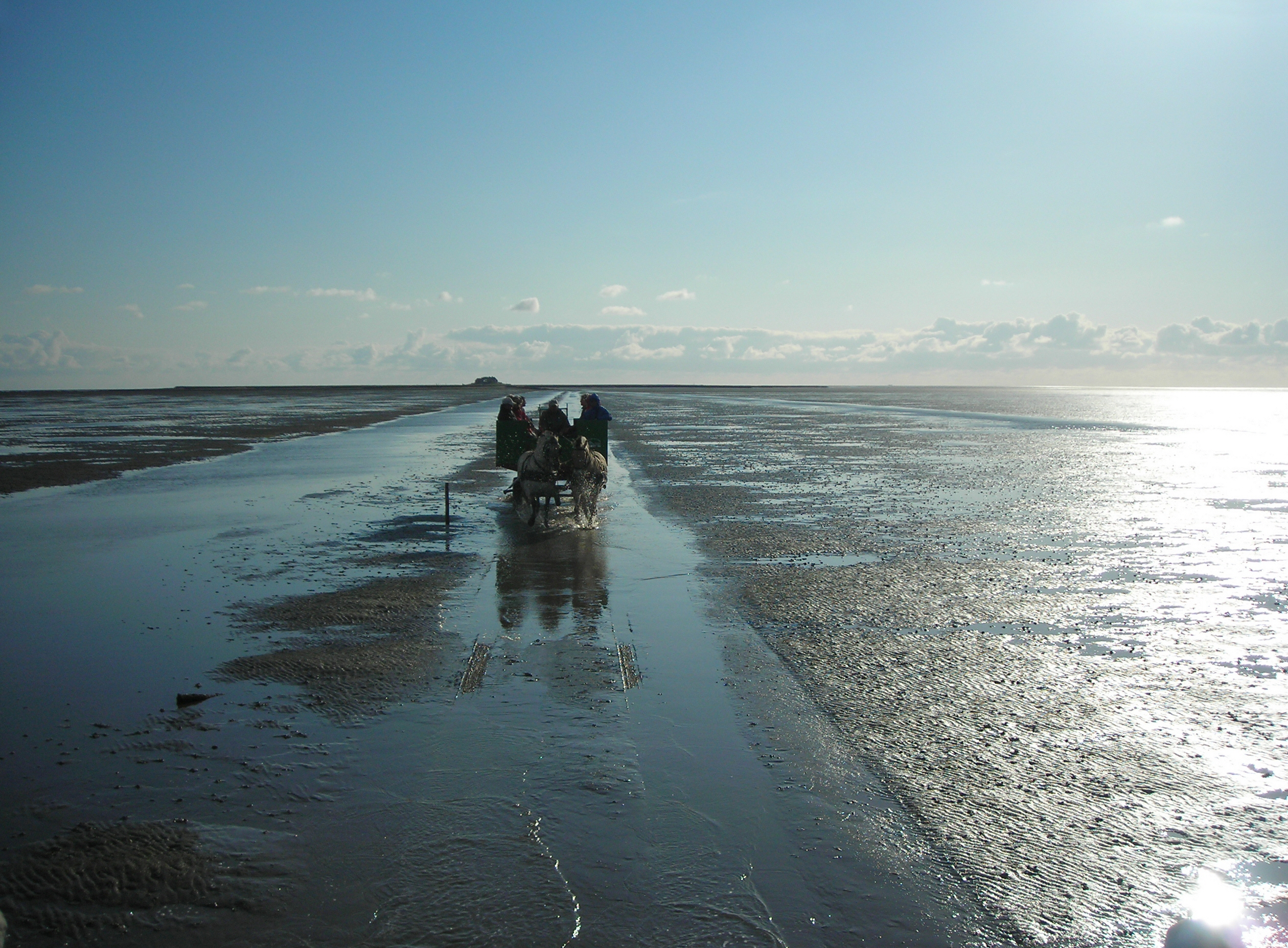
Path from Nordstrand to Südfall at low tide

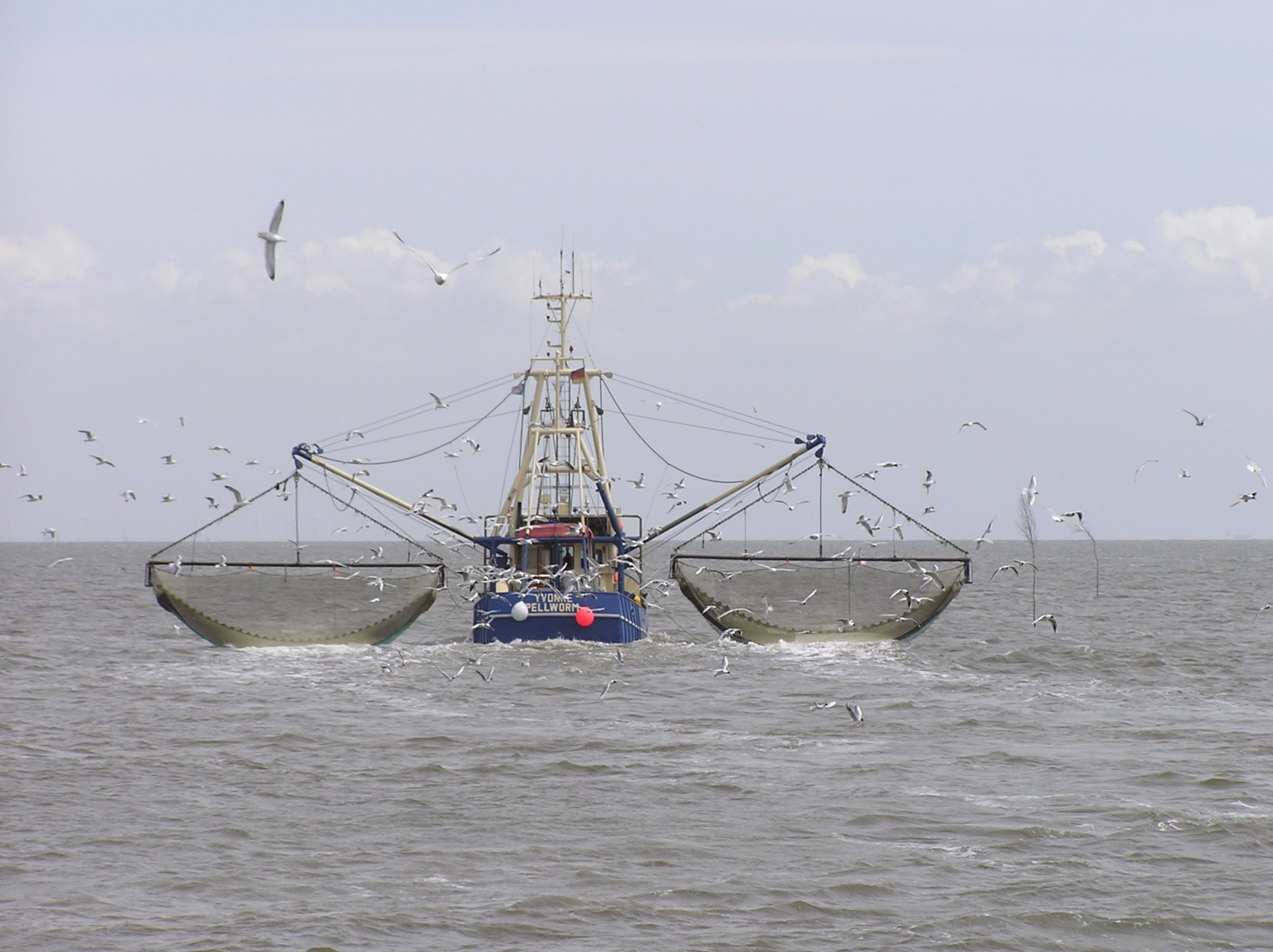
A shrimp trawler near Südfall
