= Süderoog =

Group of islands

Süderoog Saaruuch / Sønderog
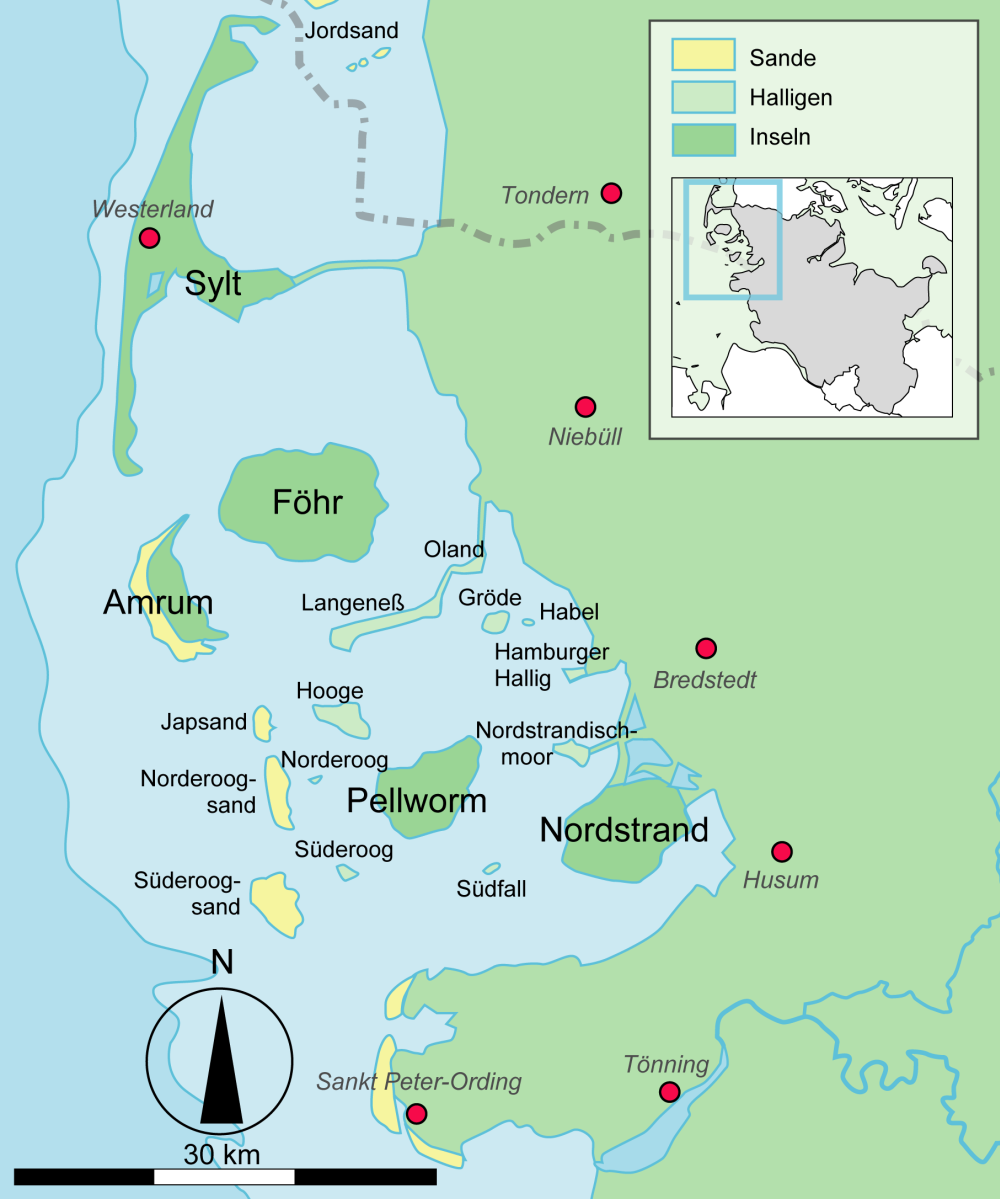
- The islands and Halligen in the North Frisian Wadden Sea
- Interactive map of Süderoog; Saaruuch / Sønderog

Geography
- Location: German Bight, North Sea
- Coordinates: 54°27′48″N 08°33′11″E
- Archipelago: North Frisian Islands
- Area: 0.62 km^{2} (0.24 sq mi)
- Length: 1.1 km (0.68 mi)
- Width: 0.785 km (0.4878 mi)
- Highest elevation: 3 m (10 ft)(Warft)

Administration
- Germany
- Capital city: Süderoog

Demographics
- Population: 4

Süderoog (German pronunciation: [ˈzyːdɐˌʔoːk]; Danish: Sønderog; North Frisian: Saruug or Saaruuch) is one of the Halligen, a group of islands in the North Frisian Wadden Sea, off the west coast of Schleswig-Holstein in north Germany. It belongs administratively to the parish of Pellworm and is a bird reserve.

Before the Burchardi flood in 1634 there were three houses on the island, one of which was inhabited by the beach lookout (Strandvogt). He was also the caretaker of the beacon, which was destroyed during the storm surge of 1634. In this storm tide, two houses were destroyed and ten people were drowned. In the February flood of 1825 the last remaining house was destroyed. It was rebuilt, however, and served again as the residence of the lookout. Today the Hallig has an area of 62 hectares (150 acres) and is currently farmed organically by a husband and wife.

The most famous resident of the island was Hermann Paulsen Neuton who, from 1927 until he died in 1951, ran an international youth meeting place, the "Island of Boys" (Insel der Jungen). It was continued after his death by his wife, Gunvor, and in 1960, converted into a foundation, whose aim was "based on Hermann Neuton Paulsen's work and in the interests of international understanding, to give young people from different countries the opportunity to meet on the island of Süderoog in an atmosphere of freedom borne out of responsibility, to get to know one another as friends, and to live together in ways that are to match the development of psychology and pedagogy at any time. "(§ 2 of the Foundation's Charter, Stockholm, 22 February 1960).

Difficult sanitary conditions, which could not be sufficiently improved, and damage caused by the flood of 1962 led to the gradual decline of Süderoog's holiday work. The Hallig that had been in the private ownership of the Paulsen family for centuries was finally sold in 1971 to the state of Schleswig-Holstein. In 1974, the foundation was dissolved.

Süderoog is inhabited by a family of four, who rent the Hallig from the state of Schleswig-Holstein. Both parents are active in coastal protection and look after the preservation of the island, which has UNESCO-World-Heritage status. Public access to Süderoog is only possible as part of a guided tour from Pellworm.

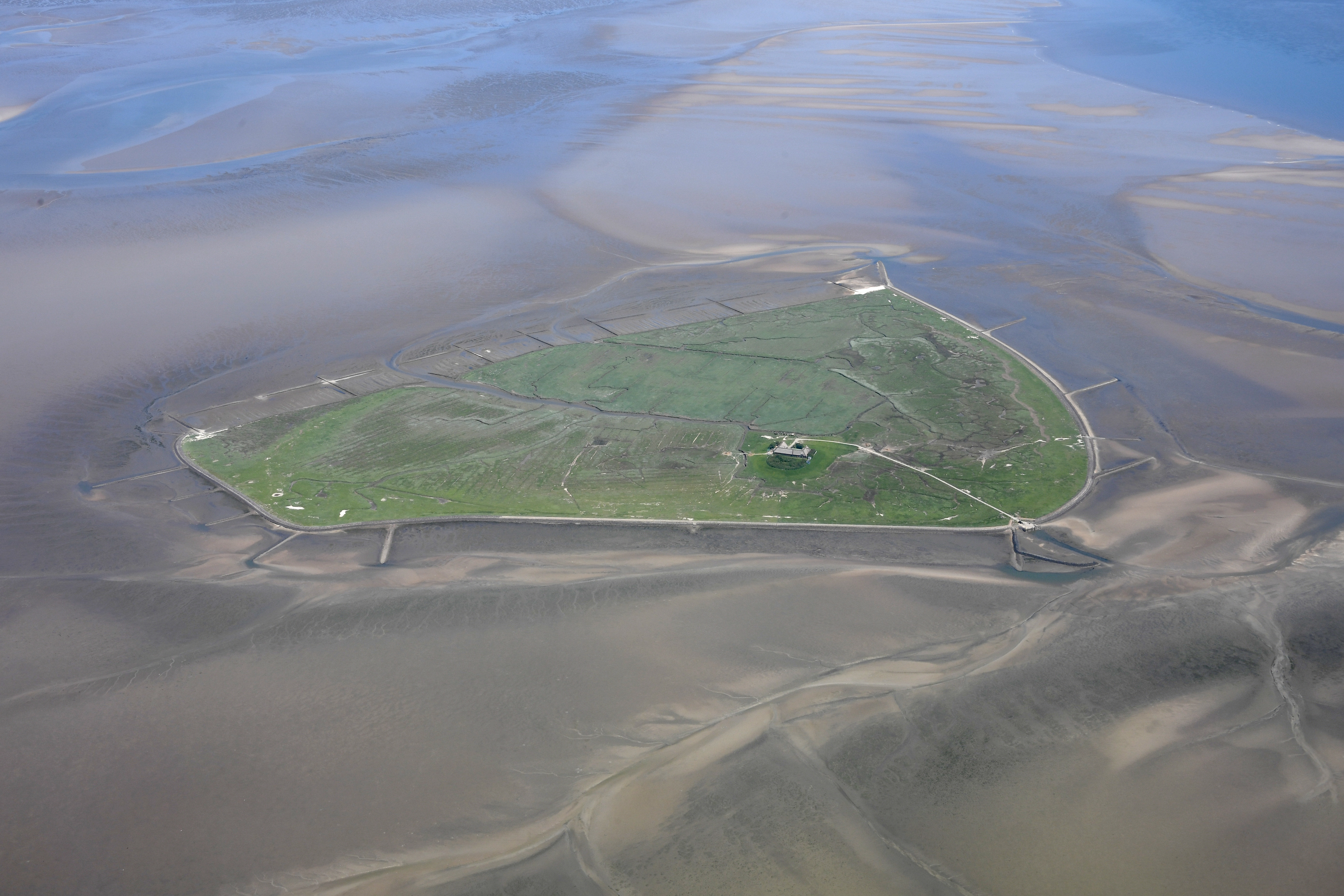
Hallig Süderoog at low tide

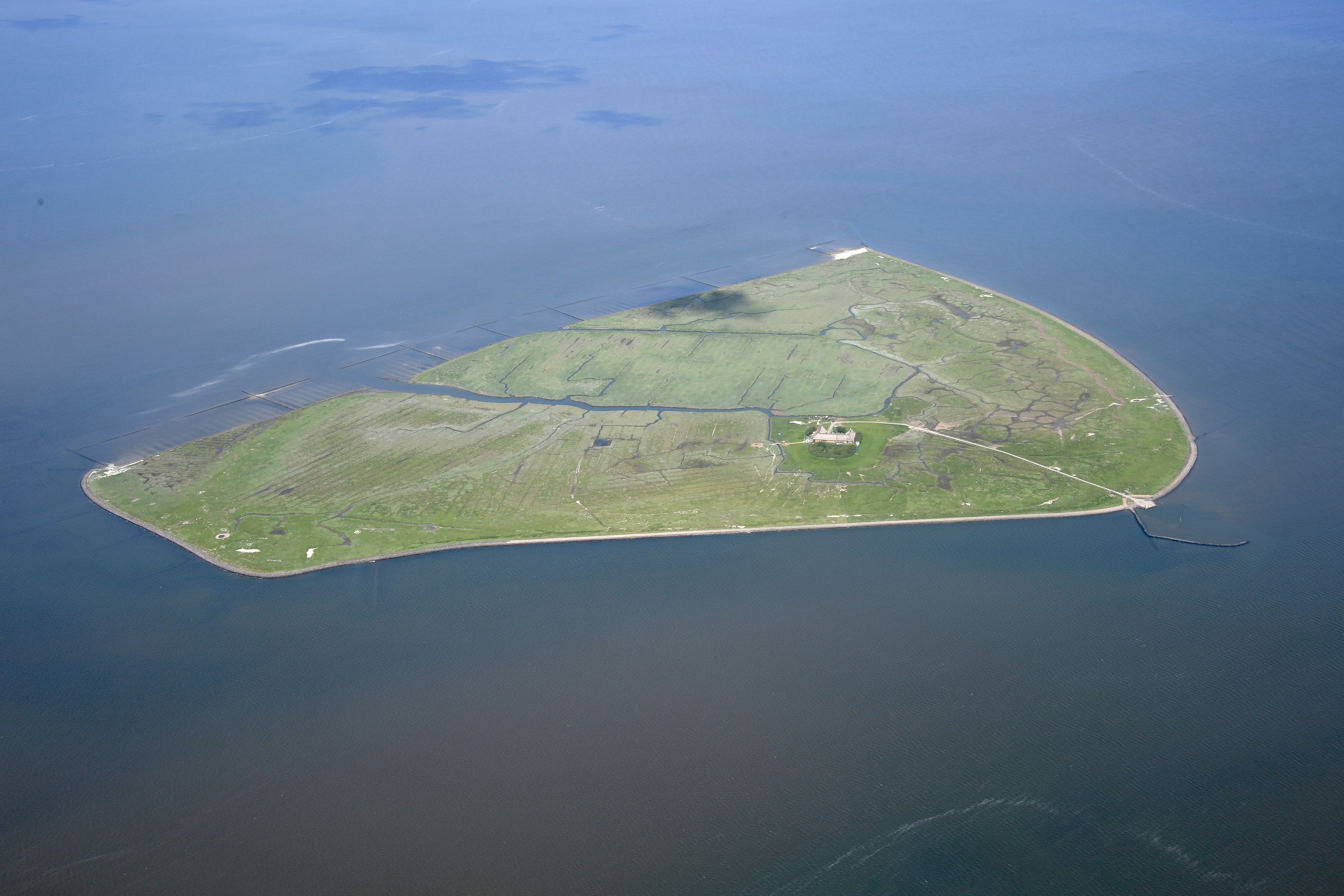
Hallig Süderoog at high tide
