= Langli (island) =

Island in Denmark

Coordinates: 55°30′51″N 8°18′55″E

Langli location

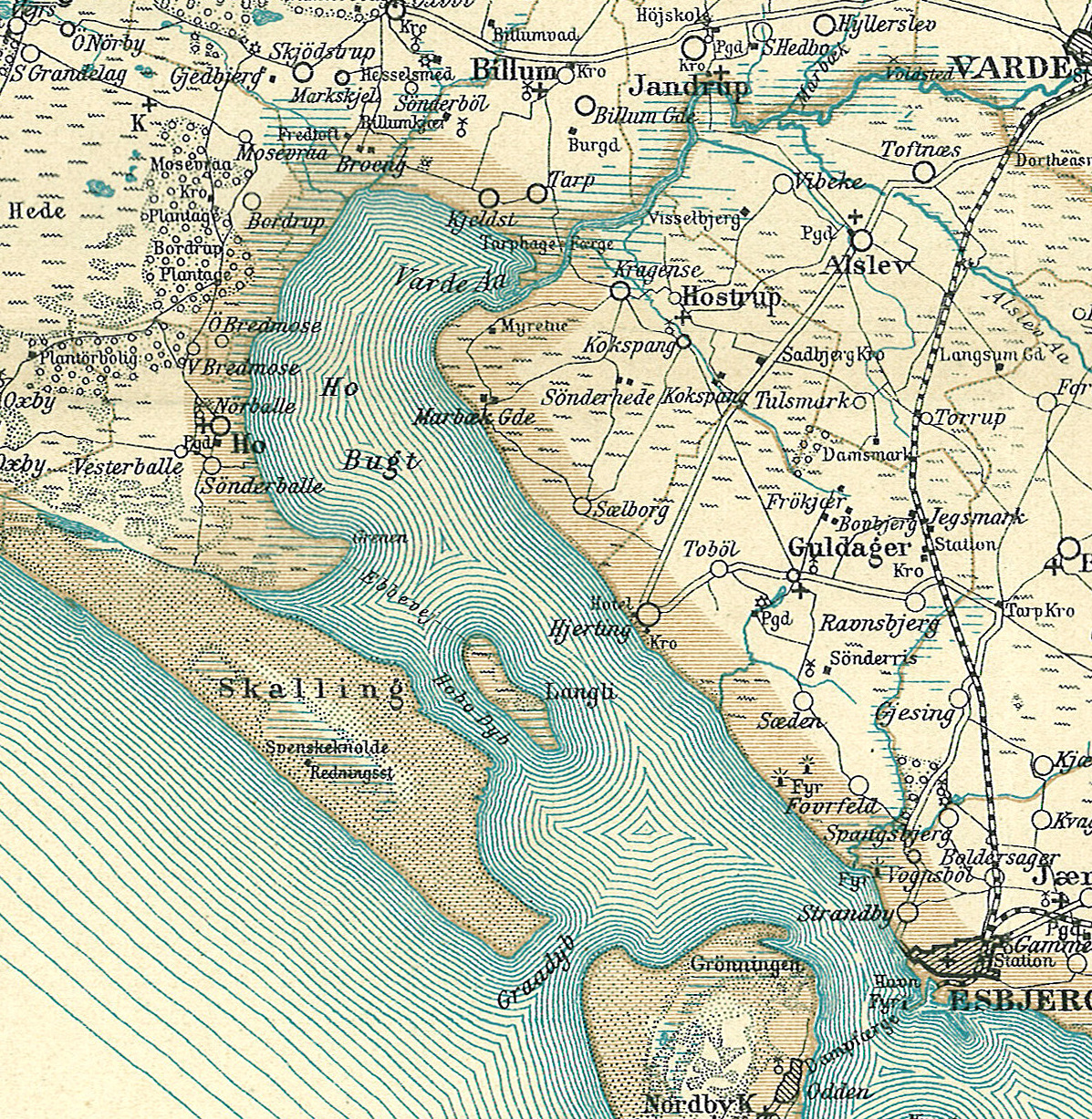
Map of Ho Bugt

Langli is a small marsh island in the Ho Bugt near Esbjerg on the Danish North Sea Coast.

It is 0.8 km (0.5 mi) long and is accessible from Ho over a 3 km (2 mi) long causeway at low tide. Langli (original “Langeleje” = long camp) was up to the flood of 1634 part of a peninsula. Afterwards sea-laterally a second peninsula (today Skallingen) began to develop itself, which from now on protected Langli.

The island was used for agriculture from the 16th century, but was not permanently settled until 1840 when two families moved there. They diked the island and successfully operated agriculture. In 1911 there were 38 inhabitants and even one school. The destruction by two floods and the refusal of the state to support the reconstruction of the dikes led to all inhabitants leaving the island in 1915. A later owner built himself a mansion on Langli. In 1982 the Danish state took the island over. Today, a scientific station is placed in the mansion.

Langli is accessible to the public, by foot, between 16 July and 15 September each year. A multiplicity of different kinds of bird breed on Langli, e.g. seagulls, black-fronted terns etc.
