= Gröde =

Gröde Groue / Grøde
- Municipality
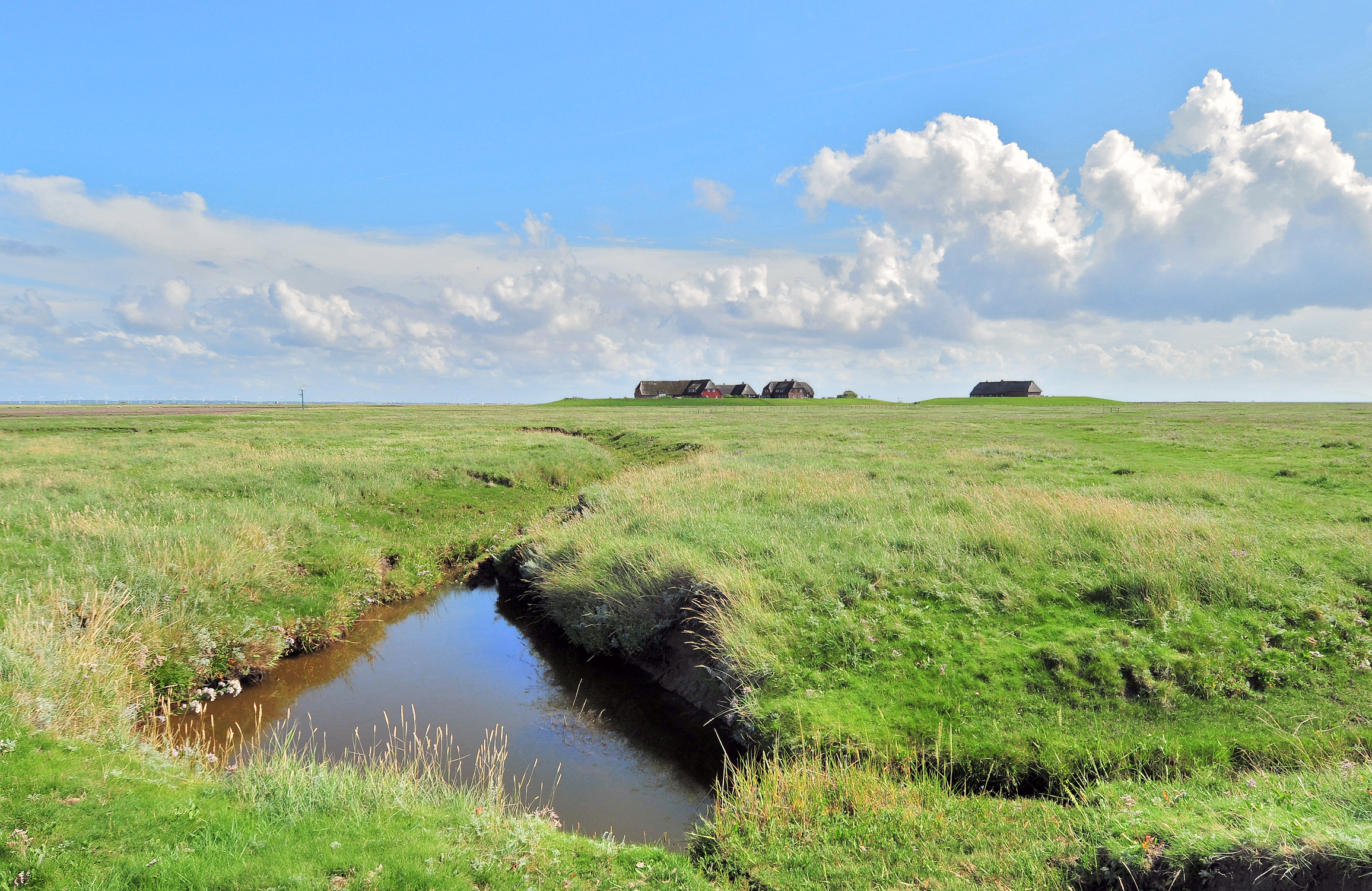

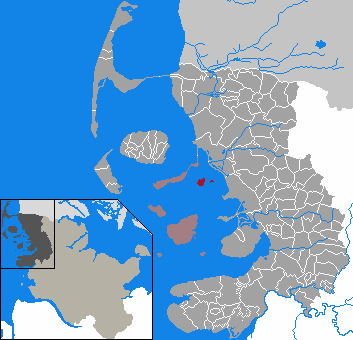
- Location of Gröde; Groue / Grøde within Nordfriesland district
- Interactive map of Gröde; Groue / Grøde
- Location within Germany Location within Schleswig-Holstein
- Coordinates: 54°38′10″N 8°43′25″E
- Country: Germany
- State: Schleswig-Holstein
- District: Nordfriesland
- Municipal assoc.: Pellworm

Government
  - Mayor: Volker Mommsen

Area
  - Total: 2.52 km^{2} (0.97 sq mi)
- Elevation: 1 m (3.3 ft)

Population (2025-12-31)
  - Total: 6
  - Density: 2.4/km^{2} (6.2/sq mi)
- Time zone: UTC+01:00 (CET)
  - Summer (DST): UTC+02:00 (CEST)
- Postal codes: 25869
- Dialling codes: 04674
- Vehicle registration: NF

Gröde (German pronunciation: [ˈɡʁøːdə]; Danish: Grøde; North Frisian: di Grööe; Low German: Grööd) is a municipality in the district of Nordfriesland, in Schleswig-Holstein, Germany. With only 11 inhabitants, the municipality, which is coterminous with the hallig it is situated on (Hallig Gröde), has the smallest population of any municipality in Germany. The inhabitants of the island make a living from tourism and limited agriculture. Gröde forms the smallest electoral district in the country, with the tally reported practically immediately after polls close.

Gröde belongs to the Amt of Pellworm with its seat on the larger island of Pellworm, from where a number of municipal duties are carried out.
