= Danish Wadden Sea Islands =

Island group in Denmark

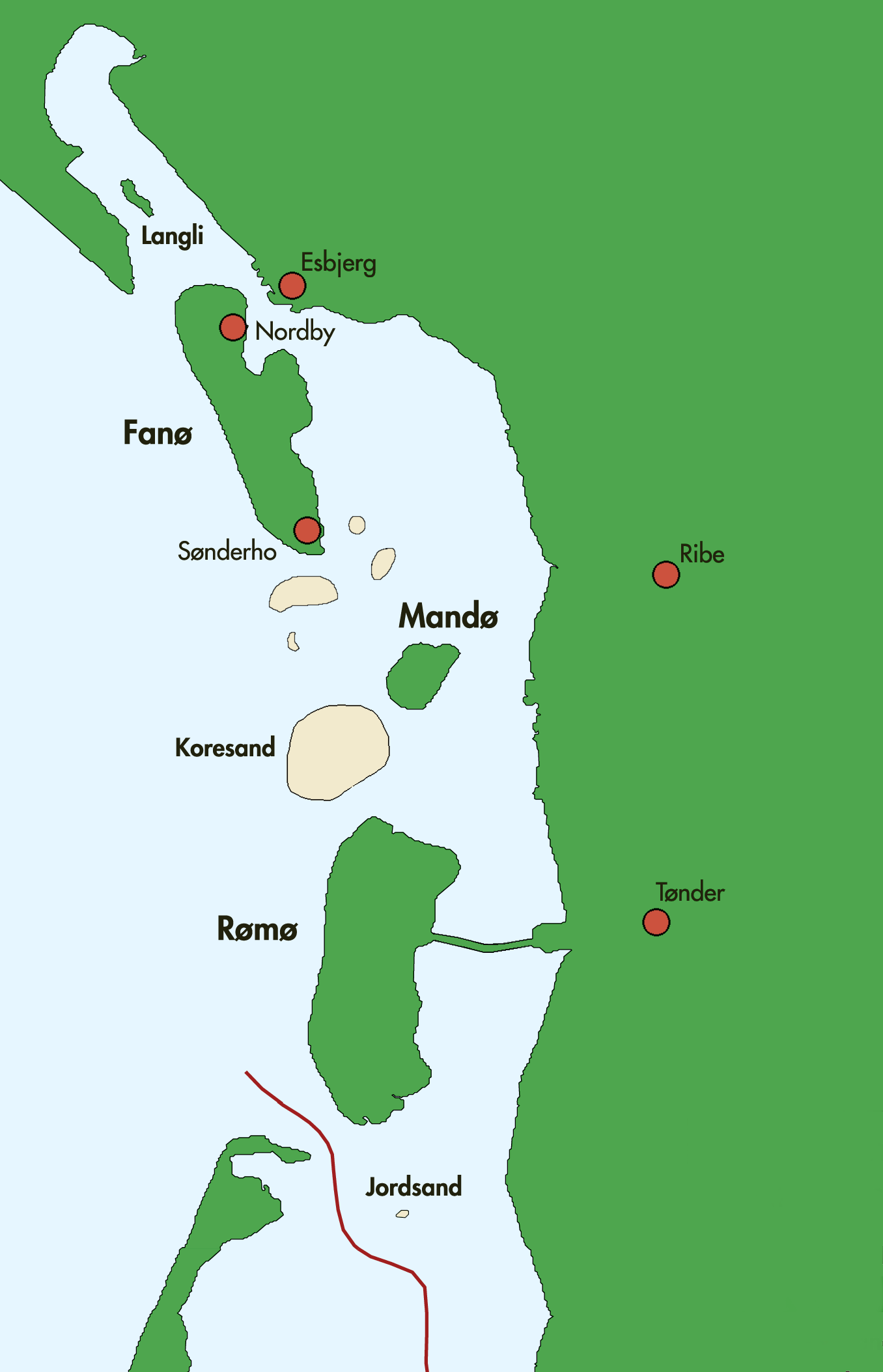

Geography
- Location: Wadden Sea
- Coordinates: 55.277°N 8.539°E
- Total islands: 6
- Major islands: Rømø, Fanø

Administration
- Denmark
- Region: Region of Southern Denmark
- Municipalities: Esbjerg municipality Tønder municipality

Demographics
- Population: 3,700+
- Ethnic groups: Danes

The Danish Wadden Sea Islands (Danish: Danske Vadehavsøer) are a group of islands on the western coast of Jutland, Denmark. They have belonged to the region of Southern Denmark since January 1, 2007. Previously they belonged to the counties of South Jutland and Ribe.

The Danish islands differ from the German North Frisian Islands because no Frisians live on the Danish islands. The total population of all the islands is over 3,700, almost all of whom reside on the island of Fanø.

== The islands ==
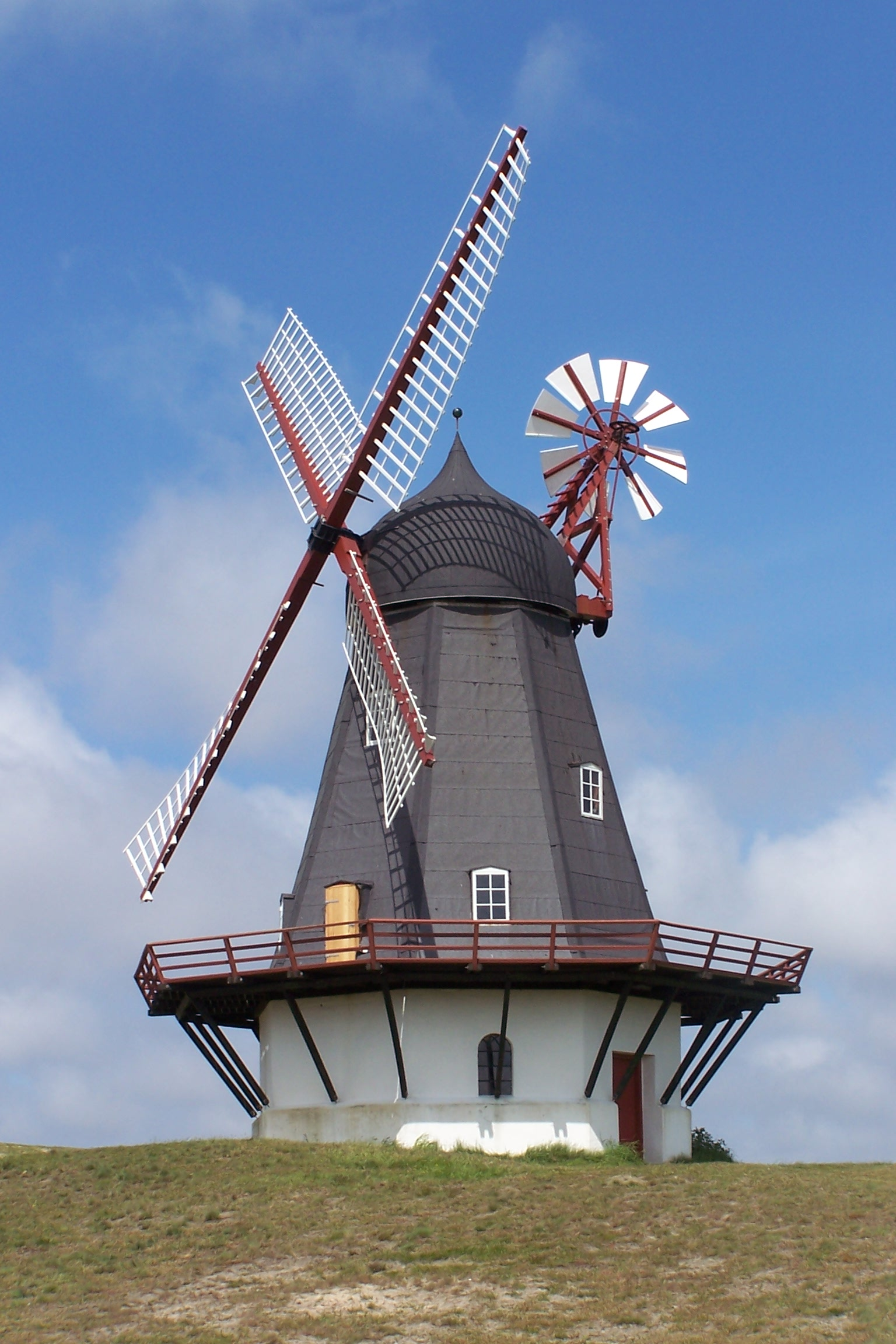
Windmill on Fanø

Fanø is located just off Esbjerg to which it is connected by a ferry. The main towns on Fanø are Nordby and Sønderho. Other towns include Fanø Vesterhavsbad and Rindby. The island is 16 kilometres (9.9 miles) long and 5 kilometres (3.1 miles) wide, and has an area of 56 square kilometres (22 square miles). As of 2005, about 3,169 people live there. A variety of environments is to be found on Fanø. Not surprisingly, a very common one is sand. The island's whole western shore is made up of beaches, and the sea off the island's northwest end is also home to the "Søren-Jessens-Sand", a vast sandbank. Fanø also has heath and a small pine wood.

Mandø is a smaller island farther south, a bit farther from the mainland. It is Denmark's only hallig, being much like the islands bearing that description among the German islands. A dike on Mandø keeps the sea at bay. Much of the islanders' history involve efforts to reclaim parts of their island from the sea. Mandø is known for its locally produced microbrew beer, "Bjørnehus".

Rømø is currently the southernmost of Denmark's Wadden Sea Islands (a small uninhabited one called Jordsand was farther south, but sank in 1999, leaving behind only a sandbank). Rømø is linked to the Danish mainland by a road running across a causeway, and the island also lies only about 3 kilometres (1.9 miles) from its German neighbour Sylt, to which it is connected by ferry. It is home to a number of small communities such as Kongsmark, Østerby, Lakolk, and Sønderstrand.

There is also, among Denmark's share of the archipelago, a small island named Langli, which is to be found in the Ho Bugt north of Esbjerg. It is the northernmost island in the whole group. It was once part of a peninsula whose landward stretch was washed away in a storm tide centuries ago. Since that time, another spit has formed to the west and now shields Langli from some of the sea's more destructive tendencies. Langli is nowadays home to a natural science station, housed in a villa built in the 20th century. Langli has an area of about 8 square kilometres (3.1 square miles) and can be reached from the mainland over an ebbevej (watershed) that is 3 kilometres (1.9 miles) long.

Jordsand and Koresand are two sandbanks in the Danish Wadden Sea. Jordsand is a former hallig.

== See also ==
- List of islands of Denmark
