= Danish reconquest of Rømø =

Part of the Torstenson War

- Part of the Torstenson War
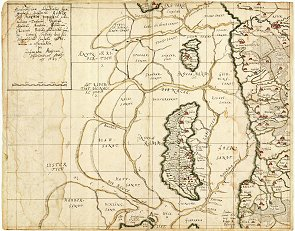
- Map of Rømø and other nearby islands from the Ducatus Sleswici by Johannes Mejer in 1643
Date	21 March 1644
Location	Rømø, Denmark–Norway (present-day Denmark) 55°08′N 8°31′E
Result	Danish victory
Territorial changes	Rømø is recaptured by Danish forces

Belligerents
Denmark–Norway	(yes) Swedish Empire

Commanders and leaders
Heinrich von Buchwald	(yes) Marcus Witte (POW)

Units involved
One naval squadron	(yes) Two sconces

Strength
9 ships 600–700 men	Unknown, but small

Casualties and losses
Minimal	150 captured Several galleys captured

The Danish reconquest of Rømø occurred on March 21, 1644, during the Torstenson War between Denmark and Sweden.

In early February, a Swedish force under the command of Carl Gustaf Wrangel departed from Ribe, capturing Rømø from Marcus Witte without resistance. While on the island, Wrangel repaired an old sconce and built a new one. When he departed, he left a small garrison under Witte, who had entered Swedish service.

Seeking to recapture the island, a naval squadron under the command of Lieutenant Colonel Heinrich von Buchwald was sent in mid-March, arriving on 21 March. Unable to put up much resistance due to their lack of musketeers, gun carriages, and suitable ammunition for their cannons, the garrison quickly capitulated.

== Background ==
On 13 December 1643, after months of preparation by Axel Oxenstierna, a Swedish army of 16,000 men invaded Holstein under the command of Lennart Torstensson, sparking the eponymous Torstenson War between Denmark and Sweden.

In January 1644, Christianspris was stormed by Torstensson, with Snogøj falling soon after. By late January, most of Holstein and all of Jutland was occupied by Swedish forces.

=== Prelude ===
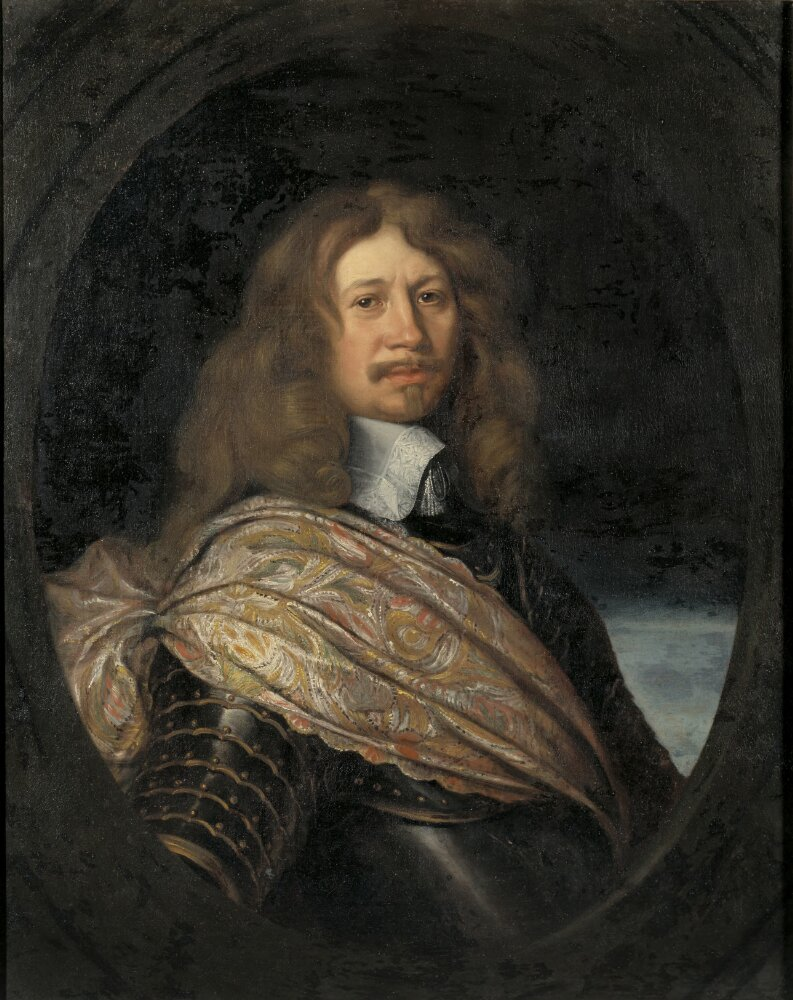
Portrait of Wrangel by Matthäus Merian the Younger, 1652

During Torstensson's campaigning in Jutland, many Danish troops fled to the North Frisian Islands. To defend these islands, a fleet of two small vessels and eight galleys under the command of Marcus Witte departed from Glückstadt.

Seeking to capture the islands, Torstensson ordered Major General Carl Gustaf Wrangel to seize them. After gathering all the boats he could, Wrangel departed from Ribe and took the islands with no resistance in early February. Witte, believing it would be more profitable to serve the Swedes, capitulated without a fight and handed over the ships as well as barges and other vessels.

Immediately after Witte capitulated, the Swedes also captured a Danish merchant fleet of 28 ships that was anchored at Königshafen on the island of Sylt. The crews were taken by surprise, as they did not know that war had broken out. Eight of these ships were so-called spaniefarare (ship bound for Spain). While some vessels were taken to Ribe, the largest vessels were left behind after their goods were taken by Wrangel and his men.

A dilapidated sconce on Rømø was repaired by Wrangel, and construction of another one began. The repaired sconce was equipped with guns. Lacking gun carriages and suitable ammunition, Wrangel sent a request for them to Torstensson. In his reply, Torstensson said that gun carriages would be built in Haderslev and ammunition would be sent from there as well. After this, Wrangel left a small garrison on Rømø under the command of Witte, whose ships had also entered Swedish service.

Soon after, the larger ships were run aground by their captains and the smaller vessels were sunk by the island's inhabitants.

== Reconquest ==
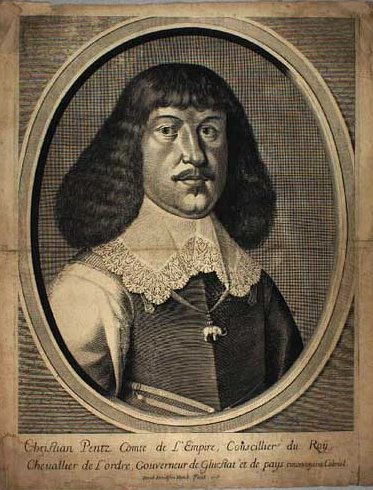
Portrait of Pentz made prior to 1650

After learning of Witte's surrender to the Swedes and their occupation of Rømø, Sylt, and other islands in North Frisia, Christian von Pentz, governor of Glückstadt, began planning to recapture the islands. Soon, a naval squadron of nine ships and 600 to 700 men under the command of Lieutenant Colonel Heinrich von Buchwald was assembled.

In mid-March, the squadron set sail and arrived at Rømø on 21 March. Apparently taken by surprise and not expecting an attack, the small Swedish garrison on the island could not offer much resistance. Their guns still lacked suitable ammunition and gun carriages, and the troops in the garrison consisted of pikemen with no musketeers.

On 29 March, Buchwald reported that he had captured two sconces on the island that had been built by the Swedes with minimal losses. Additionally, he had captured three captains, three lieutenants, three ensigns, and 140 soldiers, alongside Marcus Witte and the "royal galleys". After being taken to Glückstadt, Witte was hanged.

== Aftermath ==
Remaining at anchor, the Danish naval force, numbering 19 warships, guarded the islands. Upon being notified that Maerten Thijssen was arriving with his fleet, Buchwald refrained from burning the Danish merchant ships that had run aground. He withdrew from the North Frisian islands and returned to Glückstadt on 9 April. He hoped that he would eventually be able to bring the merchant ships back to Glückstadt.

When he was informed of the Danish attack on Rømø, Torstensson sent reinforcements and ammunition for the Swedish guns. However, on 23 March, Torstensson learned that the sconces had been captured and ordered Wrangel to recapture them. Despite the Danish force guarding the waters, he organized his forces and attempted to compel the local peasants to refloat the boats. On 2 April, Wrangel was also ordered to send back the men he did not need, as Torstensson was informed that the Danes intended to attack Torstensson's headquarters.
