= Lakolk =

Village on Rømø in southern Denmark

- Village
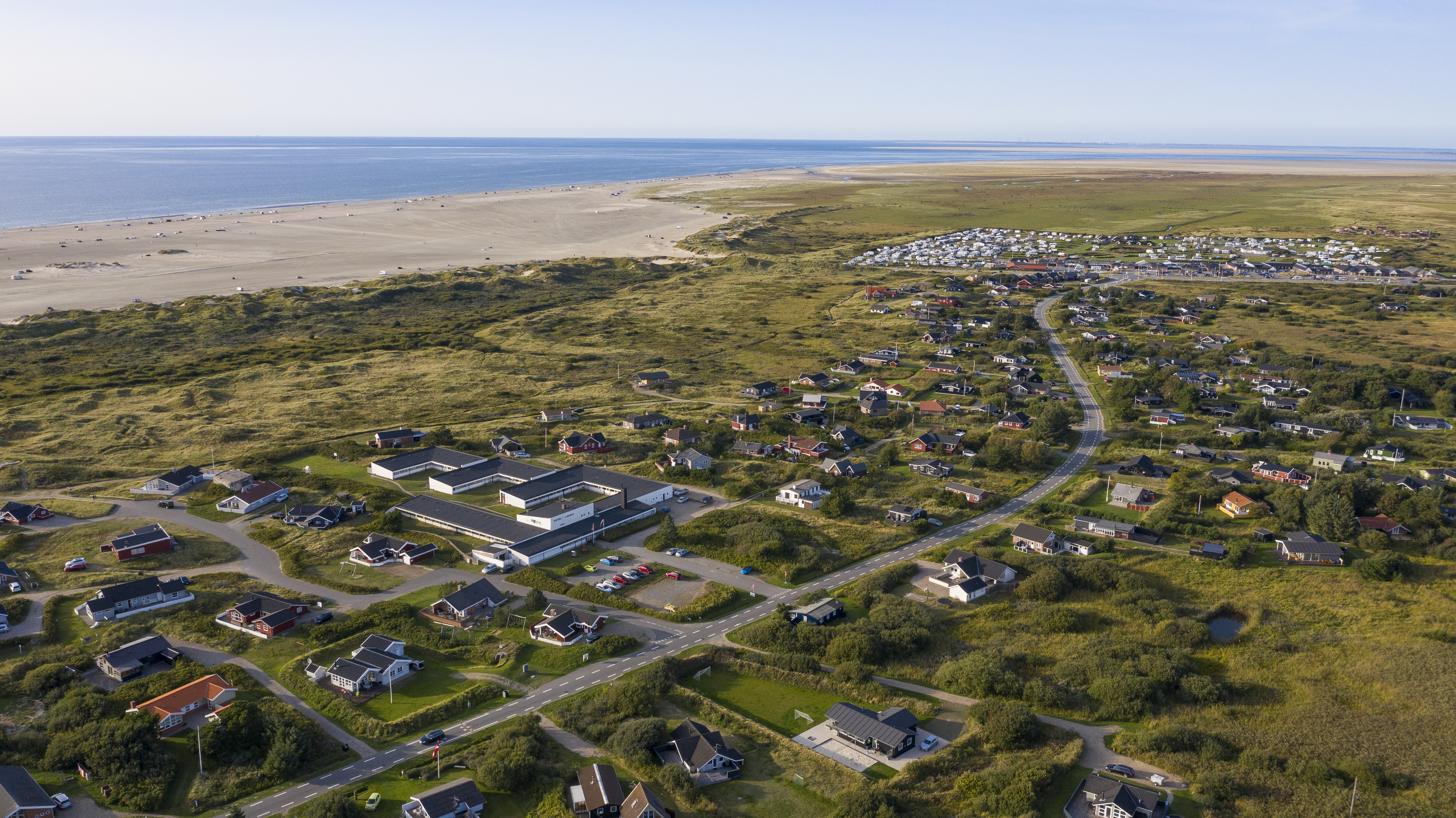
- Lakolk

- Location within Denmark
- Coordinates: 55°8′22″N 8°29′38″E
- Country: Denmark
- Region: Southern Denmark (Syddanmark)
- Municipality: Tønder
- Time zone: UTC+1 (CET)
  - Summer (DST): UTC+2 (CEST)
- Postal code: 6792

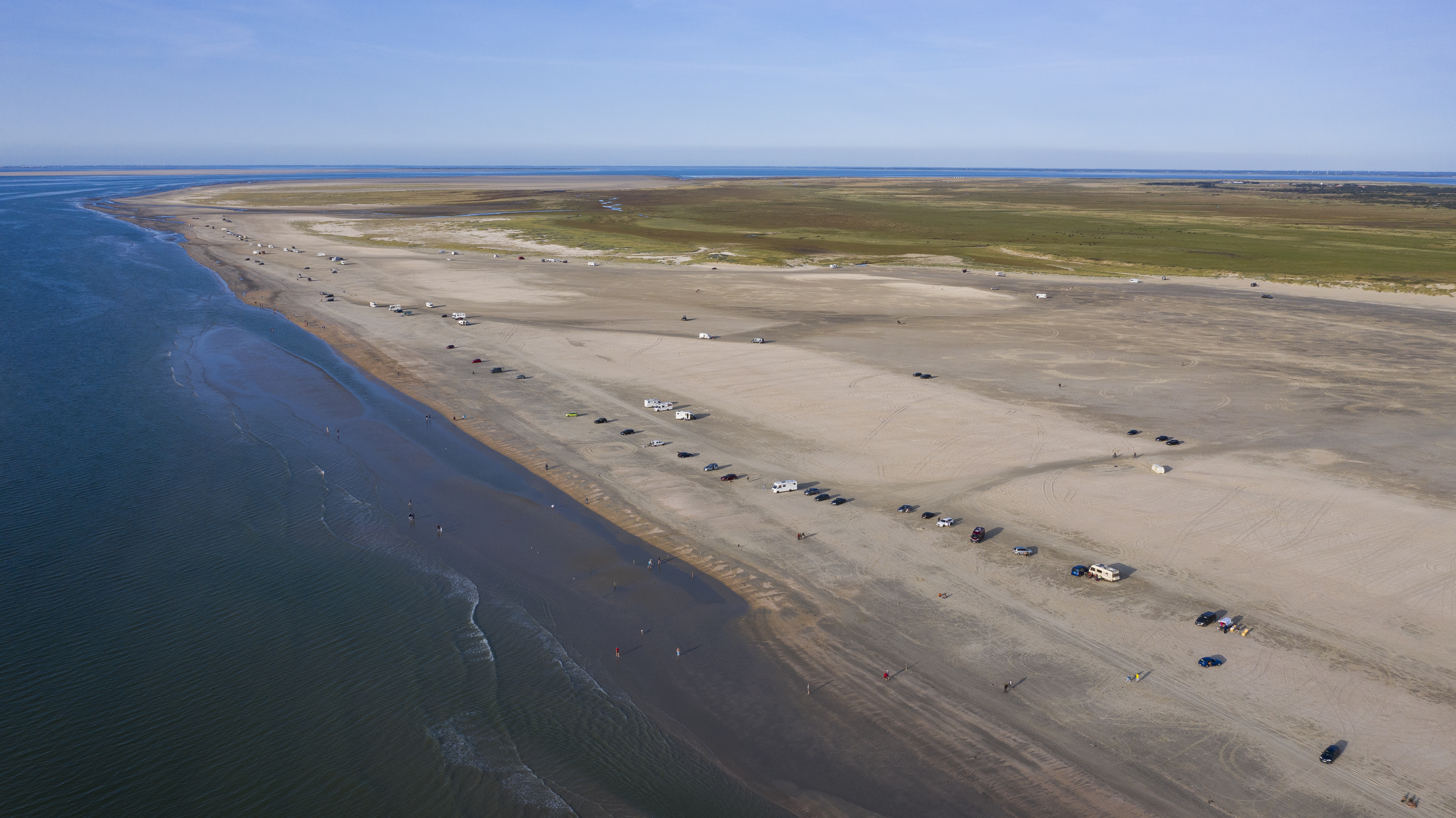
Lakolk Beach

Lakolk is a small settlement on the Danish island of Rømø, in the Wadden Sea and connected to the mainland by the Rømødæmningen. It is known for its wide sandy beach, which is one of the best beaches in Denmark for kite flying and beach sailing.

== History ==
Lakolk is one of the oldest holiday resorts on Rømø. Its origins date back to the end of the 19th century when the first summerhouses were built. Since then, Lakolk has grown into a popular holiday destination.

== Geography ==
The town is situated on the west coast of Rømø, facing the North Sea. The beach at Lakolk is one of the widest in Northern Europe, characterized by its hard-packed sand, which is firm enough to support vehicles.

== Tourism ==
The main attraction in Lakolk is its beach, which is particularly famous for its hard-packed sand, allowing cars to drive right up to the water's edge. This makes it a favored spot for families, kite surfers, and beach sailors. In addition to the beach, Lakolk has several shops, restaurants, and holiday accommodations.
