= Jordsand =

Small Danish hallig

Coordinates: 55°1′32″N 8°34′14″E

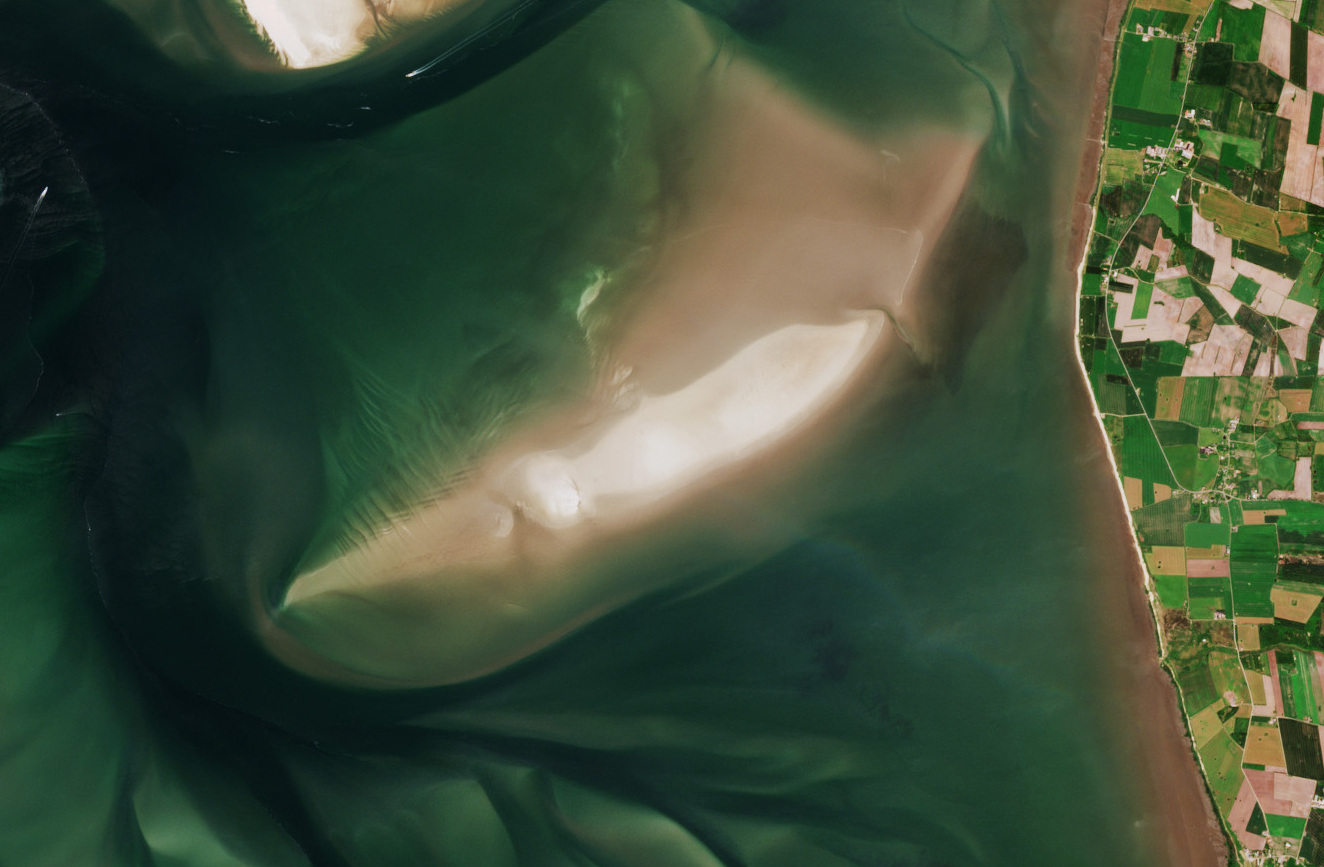
Sentinel-2 image of Jordsand

Jordsand (North Frisian: Jorsund) was a small Danish hallig located in the Wadden Sea southeast of the Danish island Rømø and east of the German island Sylt. The island was first known by the name Hiortsand ("hart island") and was possibly connected to both the mainland and the island of Sylt. The old name refers to the presence of deer on the island.

Records from 1231 describe the island as having a size equivalent of 20 km^{2} (7.7 square miles). It contained numerous terps. The island was destroyed in a series of storm tides. Its size was described in 1807 and 1873 as 40.7 and 18.4 hectares respectively. In 1895, a storm destroyed the last terp and the island was abandoned and became a bird sanctuary. Attempts to protect it from the recurring floods were made in the 1970s but with limited success since the island remained unprotected by a dyke. The island's size ultimately shrank to 2.3 hectares and the uninhabited island was finally destroyed in a flood during the winter of 1998/99. By 1999 all vegetation on the former island had disappeared, and the Danish Nature Agency removed its observational hut from the flooded area. In 1999, the island was officially registered as disappeared.

The area is now a sandbank (højsande), Jordsand Flak similar to Koresand near Fanø. Højsande denotes a sandbank that is only flooded during exceptionally high waters.

Its name lives on in the name of one of Germany's oldest environmental organizations, Verein Jordsand established in 1907.

== Sources ==
- Palle Uhd Jepsen: Wattenmeerbilder. Vardemuseum 2000
