= Havneby =

- Town
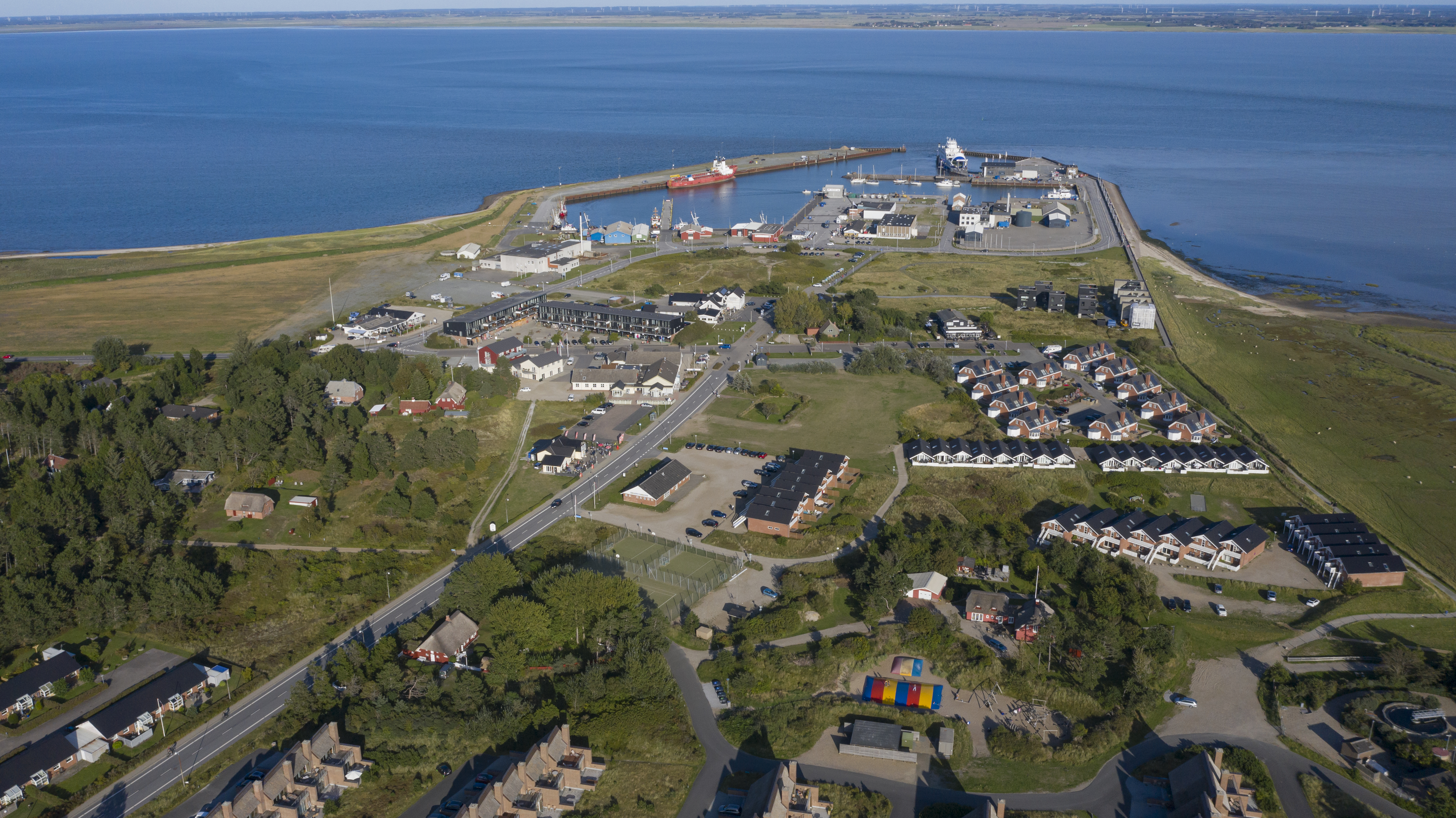
- Havneby
- Interactive map of Havneby
- Location in Region of Southern Denmark Havneby (Denmark)
- Coordinates: 55°5′17″N 8°33′37″E
- Country: Denmark
- Region: Southern Denmark (Syddanmark)
- Municipality: Tønder

Population (2026)
  - Total: 250
- Time zone: UTC+1 (CET)
  - Summer (DST): UTC+2 (CEST)
- Postal code: 6792

Havneby is the main town on the Danish island of Rømø with a population of 250 (1 January 2026).

The Rømø-Sylt ferry connects Havneby to List on the island of Sylt in Germany, and serves as one of two transport links on Rømø, the other being the Rømø Dam.
