= Rømø Church =

Coordinates: 55°6′46.65″N 8°32′33.47″E

Saint Clement's Church
- Rømø Church (Rømø Kirke)
- Sankt Clemens Kirke
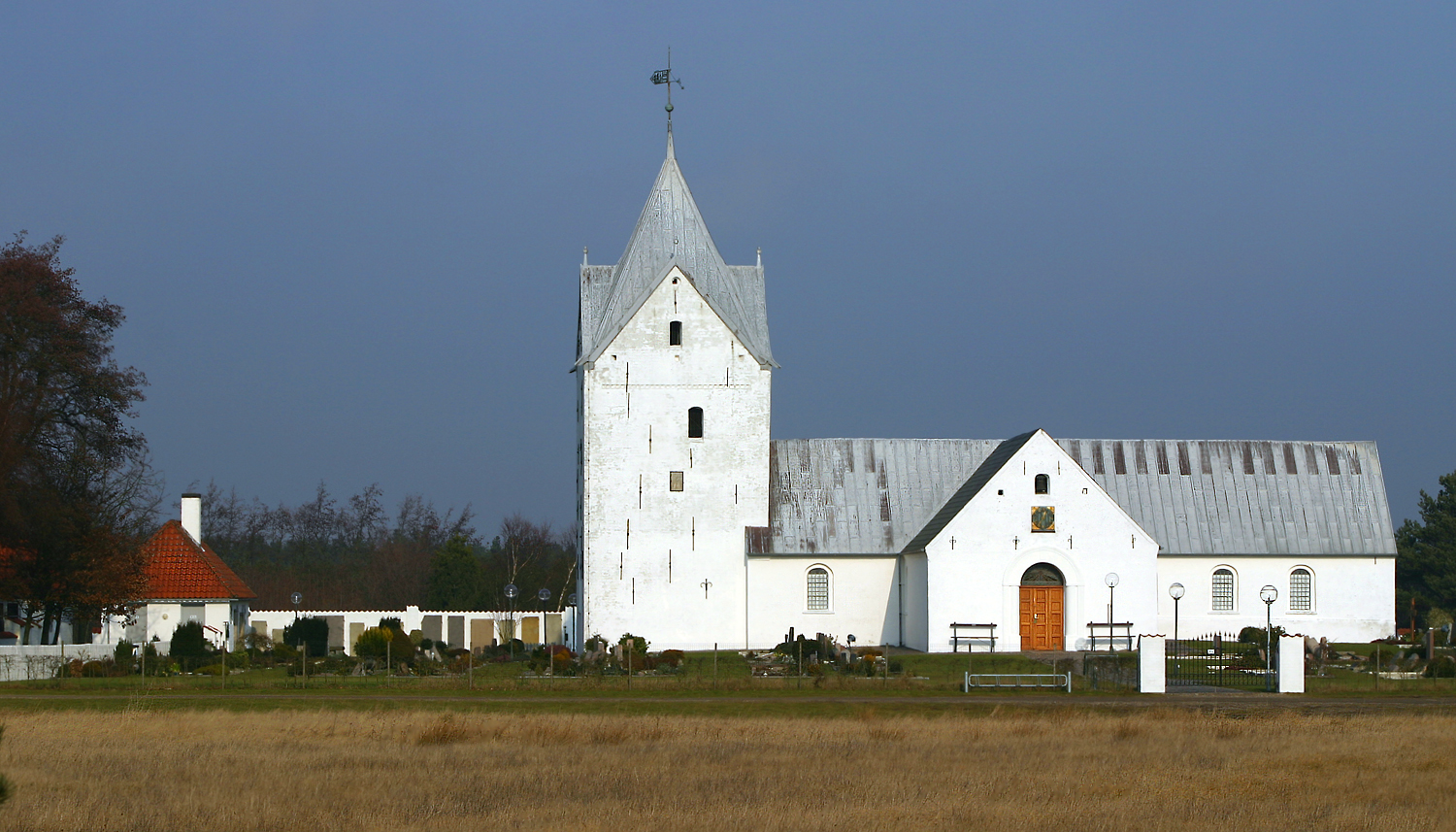
- Saint Clement's Church
- Location: Rømø, Denmark
- Denomination: Church of Denmark
- Website: sctclemensromo.dk

Architecture
- Completed: 13th to 18th century

Administration
- Diocese: Diocese of Ribe
- Parish: Rømø Sogn

St. Clement's Church (Danish: Sankt Clemens Kirke) is a Christian place of worship located on the island of Rømø in Tønder, Denmark. It belongs to the Tønder Priory of the Church of Denmark. The church was dedicated to Saint Clement, the sailors' patron saint. The oldest part of the church was built sometime after 1250 and expanded four centuries later. Possibly in the latter half of the 15th century, the church tower was built in the Gothic style. The church was expanded in the 17th and 18th centuries. Interior decoration includes several votive ships.

== Gallery ==
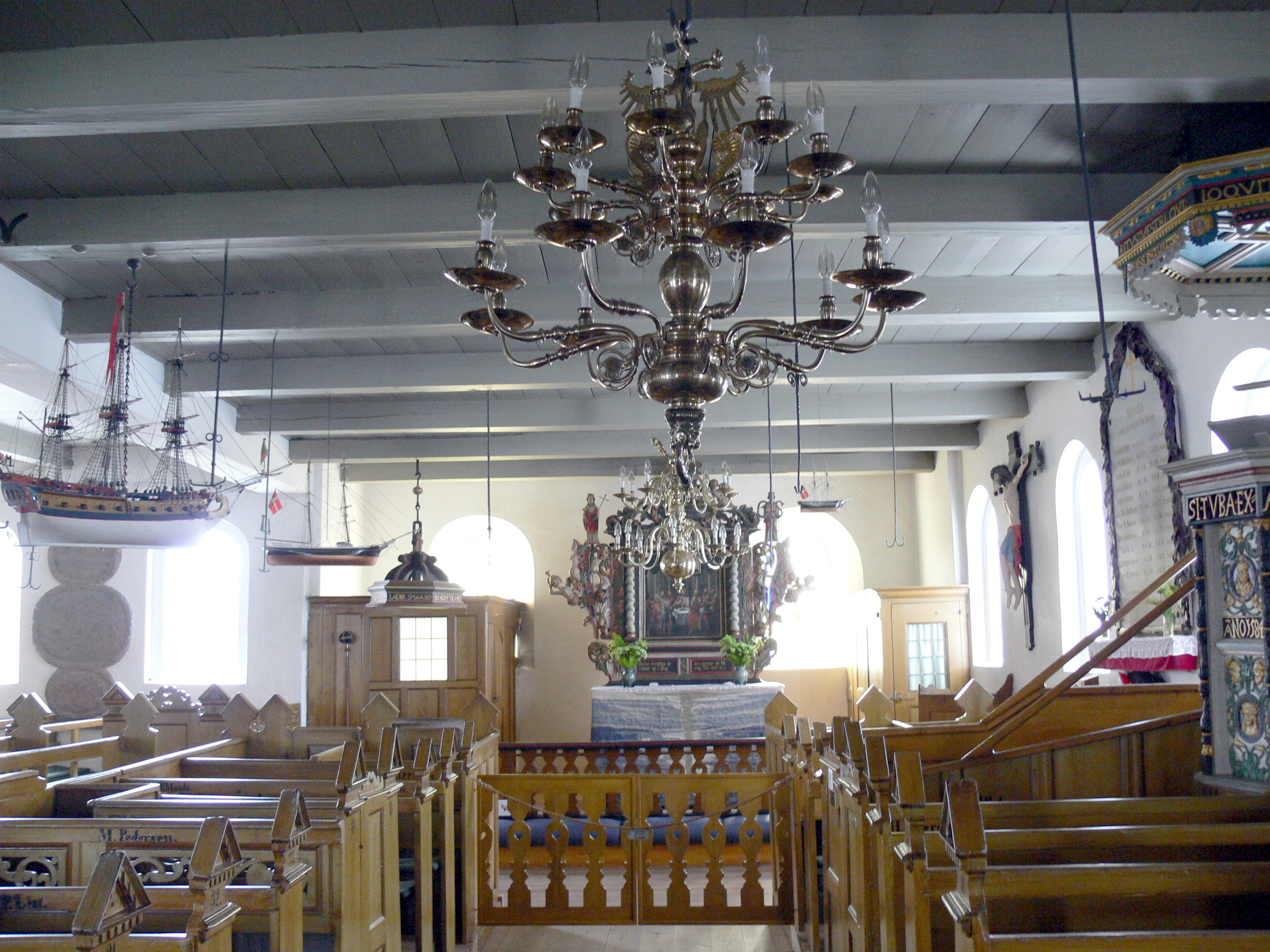

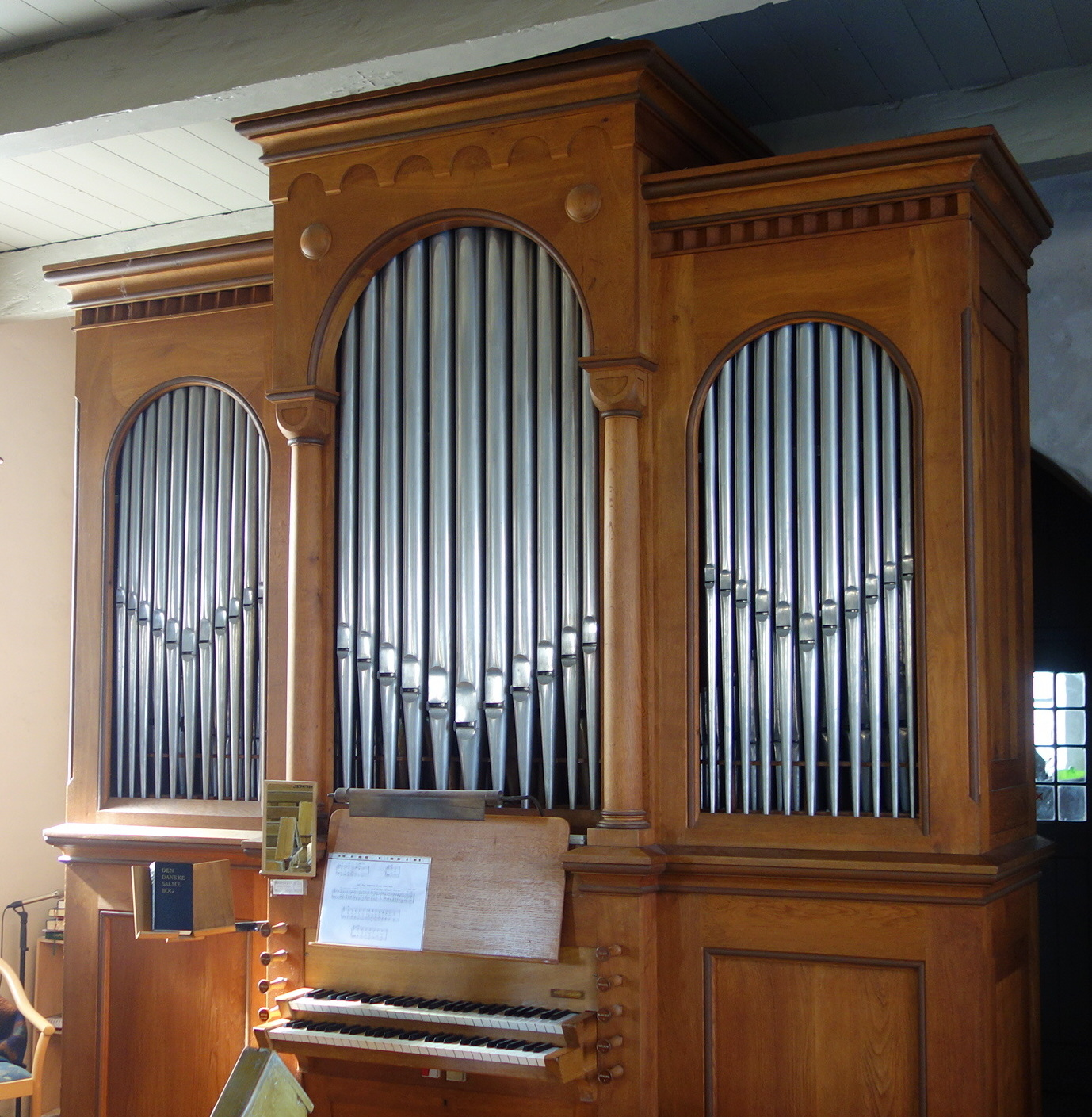

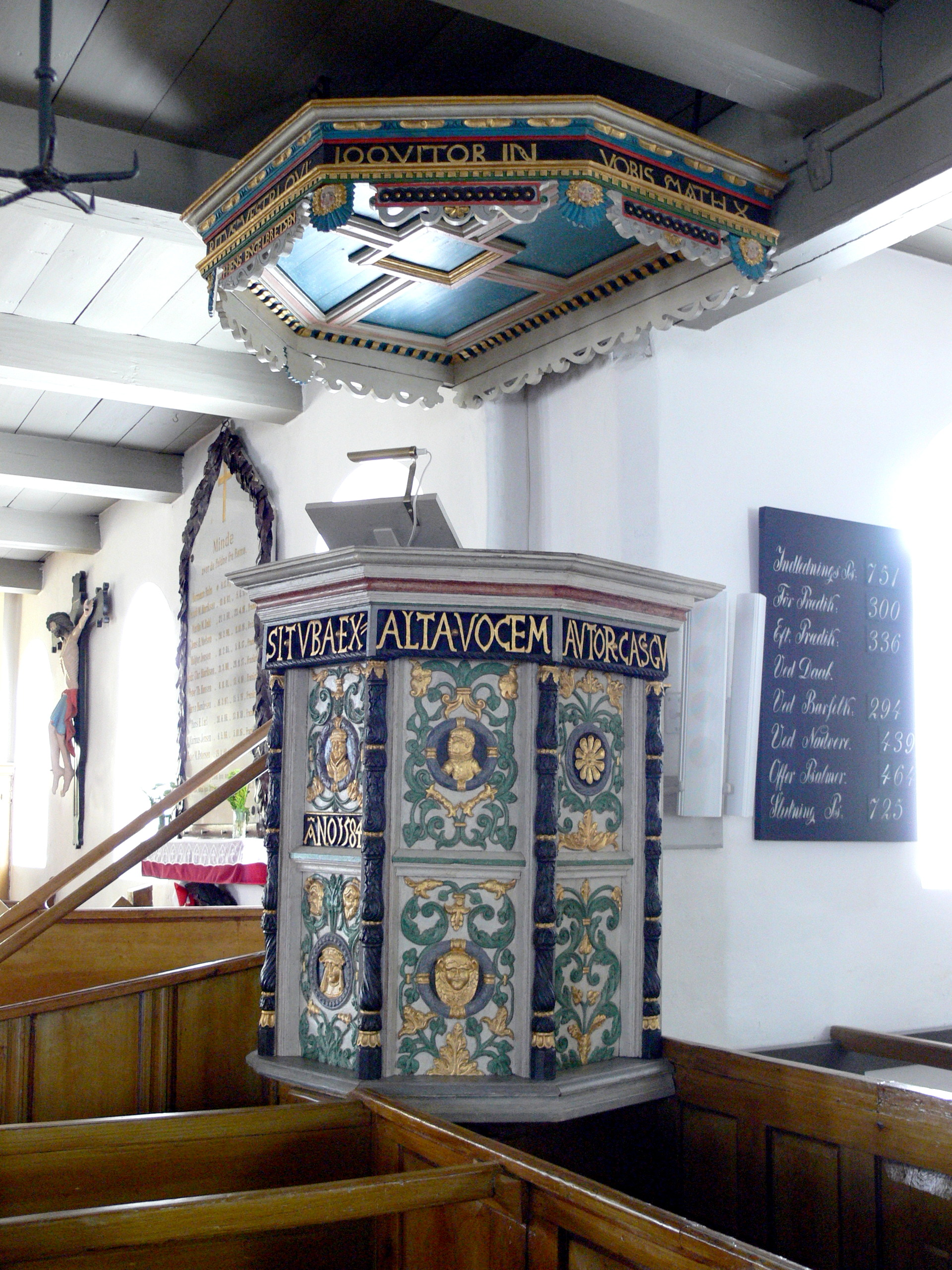

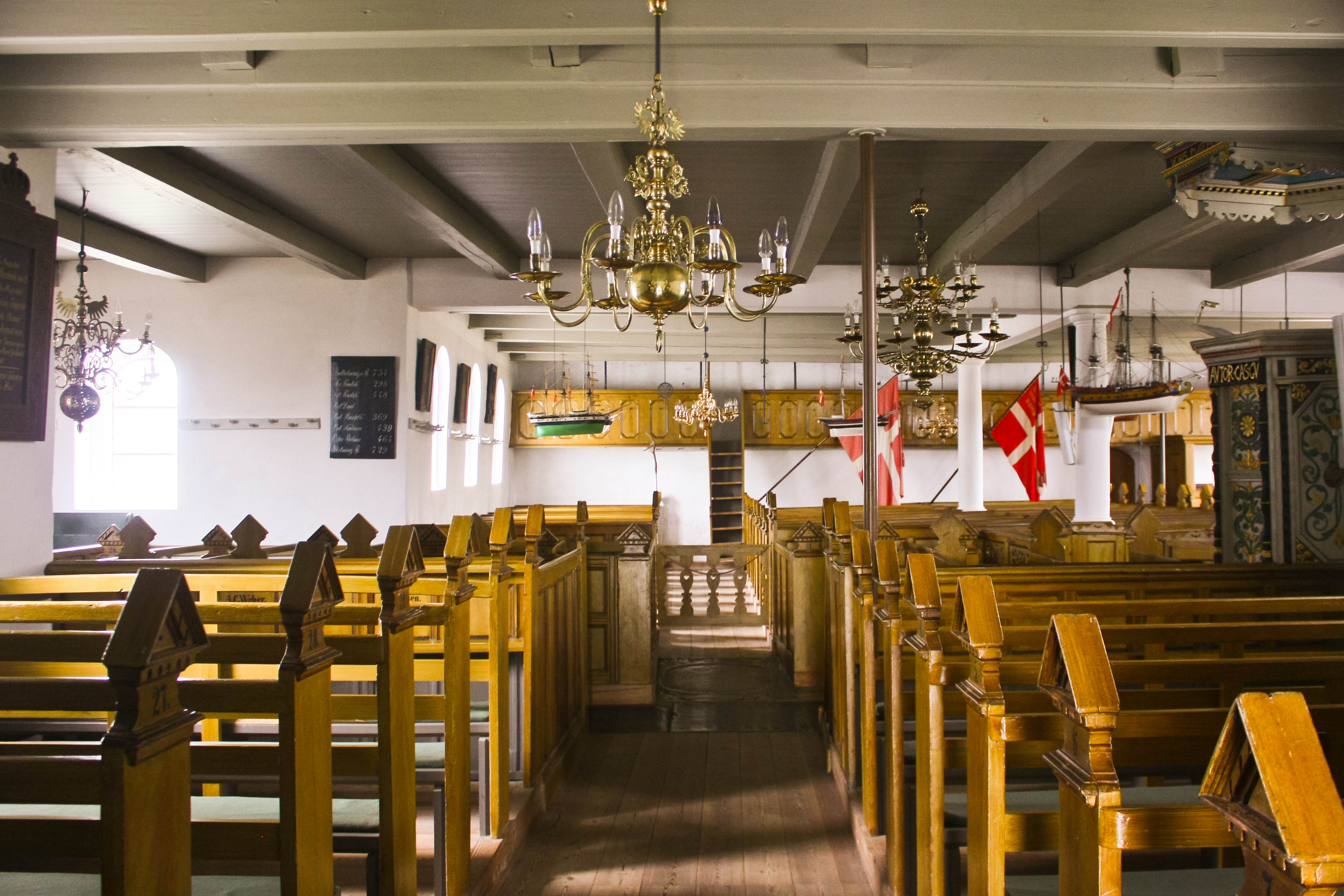

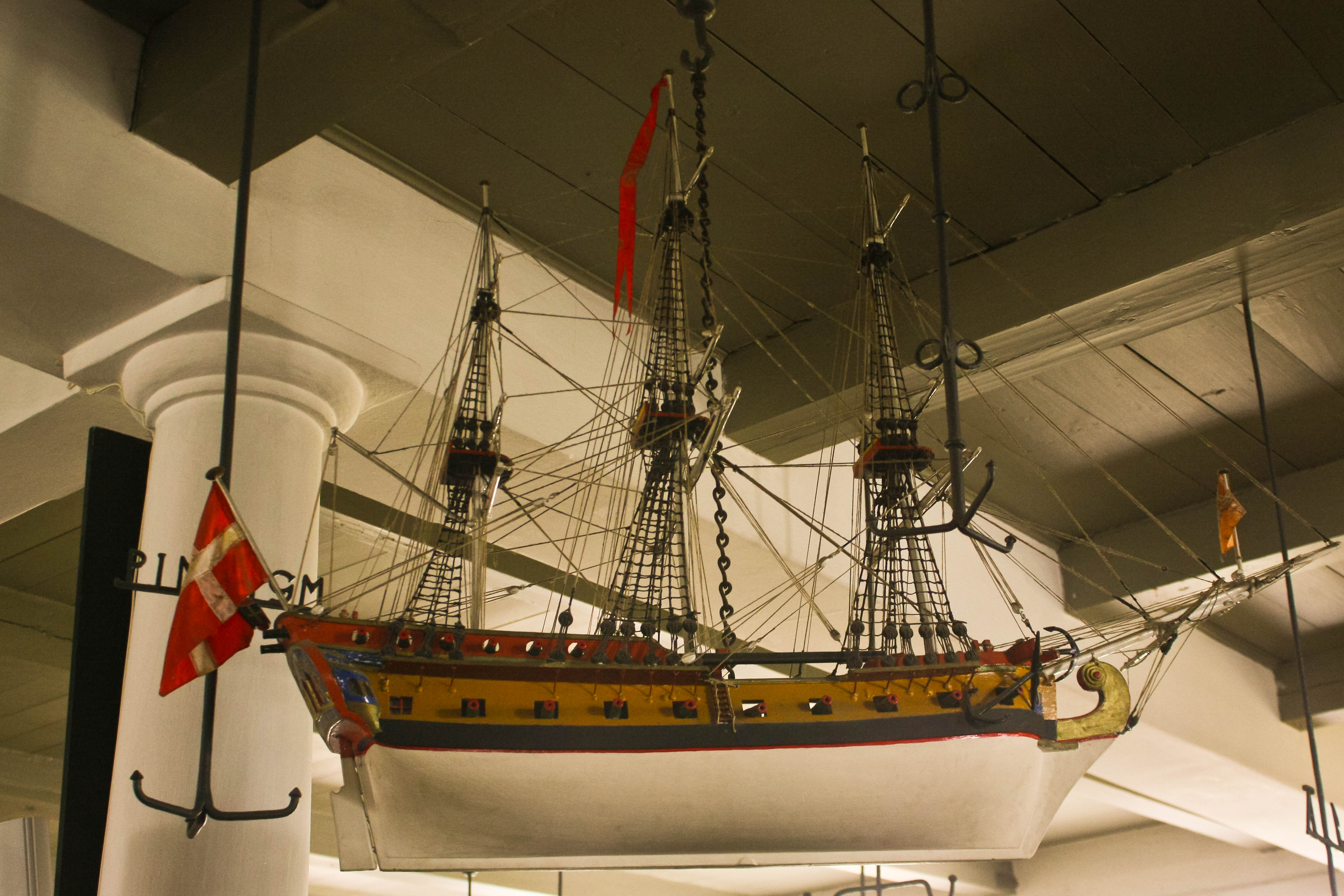
