= Rømø =

Danish island in the Wadden Sea

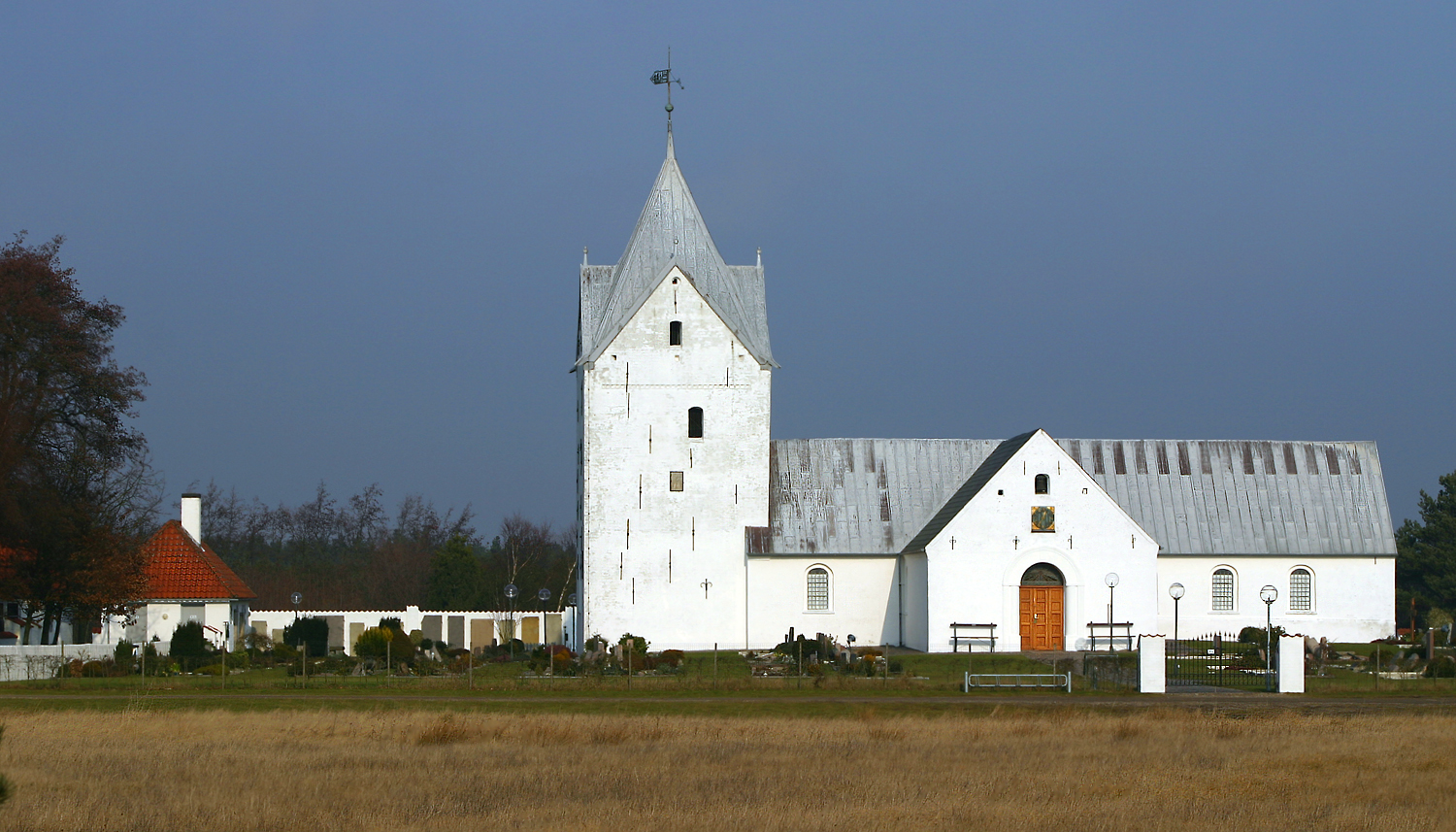
- Rømø Church

Geography
- Location: Wadden Sea
- Coordinates: 55°08′N 8°31′E
- Area: 129 km^{2} (50 sq mi)

Administration
- Denmark
- Region: South Denmark Region
- Municipality: Tønder Municipality
- Largest settlement: Havneby (pop. 302)

Demographics
- Population: 650 (2011)
- Pop. density: 5.3/km^{2} (13.7/sq mi)

Rømø (Danish pronunciation: [ˈʁœːˌmøˀ]; German: Röm, North Frisian: Rem) is a Danish island in the Wadden Sea. Rømø is part of Tønder Municipality. The island had 650 inhabitants as of 1 January 2011, and covers an area of 129 km².

Rømø is the southernmost of Denmark's Wadden Sea Islands. This distinction was previously held by the small uninhabited island of Jordsand, which sank in 1999.

== History ==
Rømø is part of Southern Jutland, a historical region of Denmark. In early February 1644, Swedish forces led by Carl Gustaf Wrangel captured the island. However, on 21 March, the island was recaptured by a Danish force led by Heinrich von Buchwald.

With the Second Schleswig War (1864), the region became part of Prussia (and later the German Empire) as part of the Province of Schleswig-Holstein. Rømø and the rest of Southern Jutland was reunited with Denmark in 1920, after the Schleswig plebiscite. From 1899 to 1940, a horse-drawn tram line ran from Kongsmark inland to Lakolk.

Between 1970 and 2006, Rømø was part of Skærbæk Municipality (da) in South Jutland County. Since 2007 it has been part of Tønder Municipality in the Region of Southern Denmark.

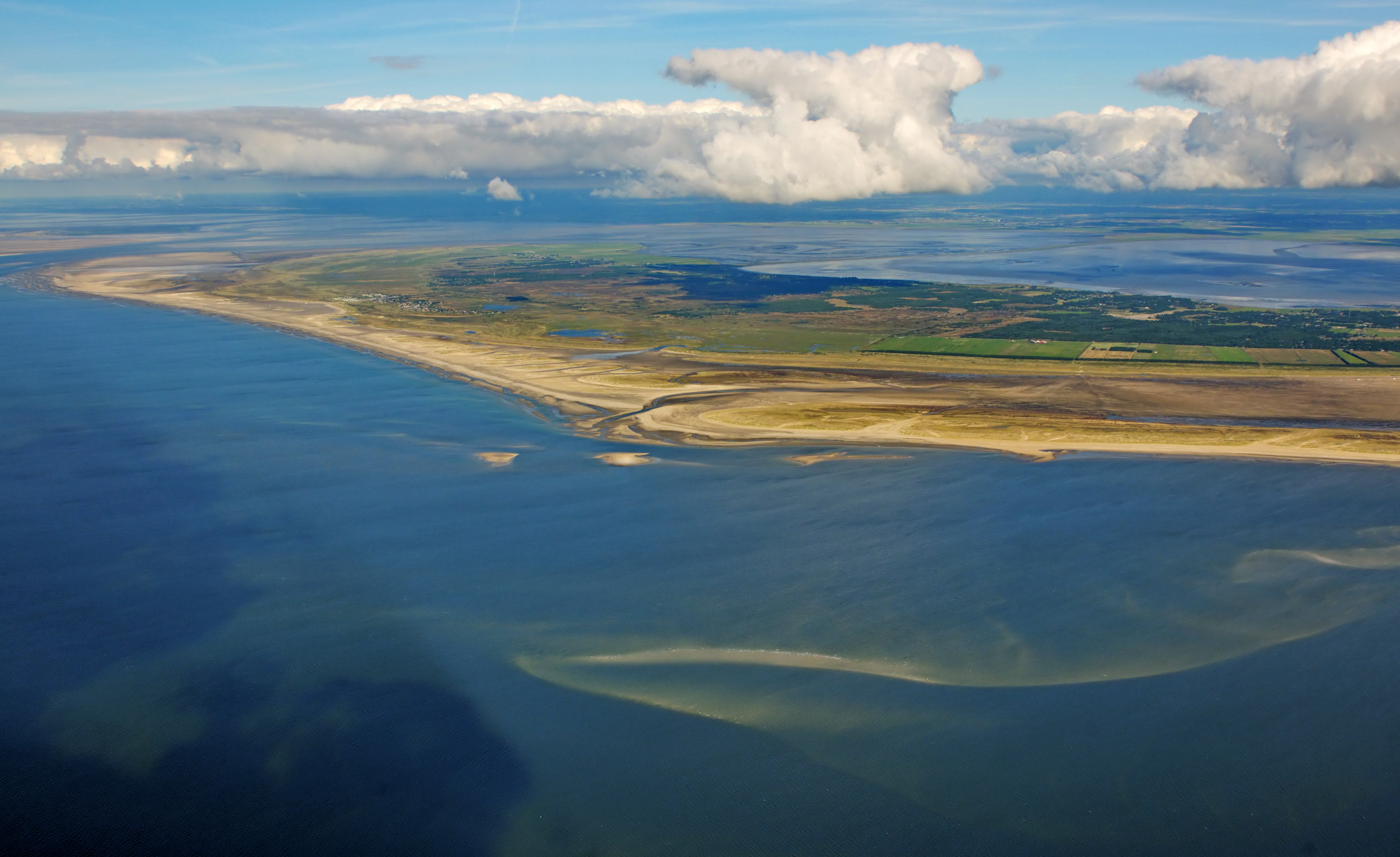
Rømø

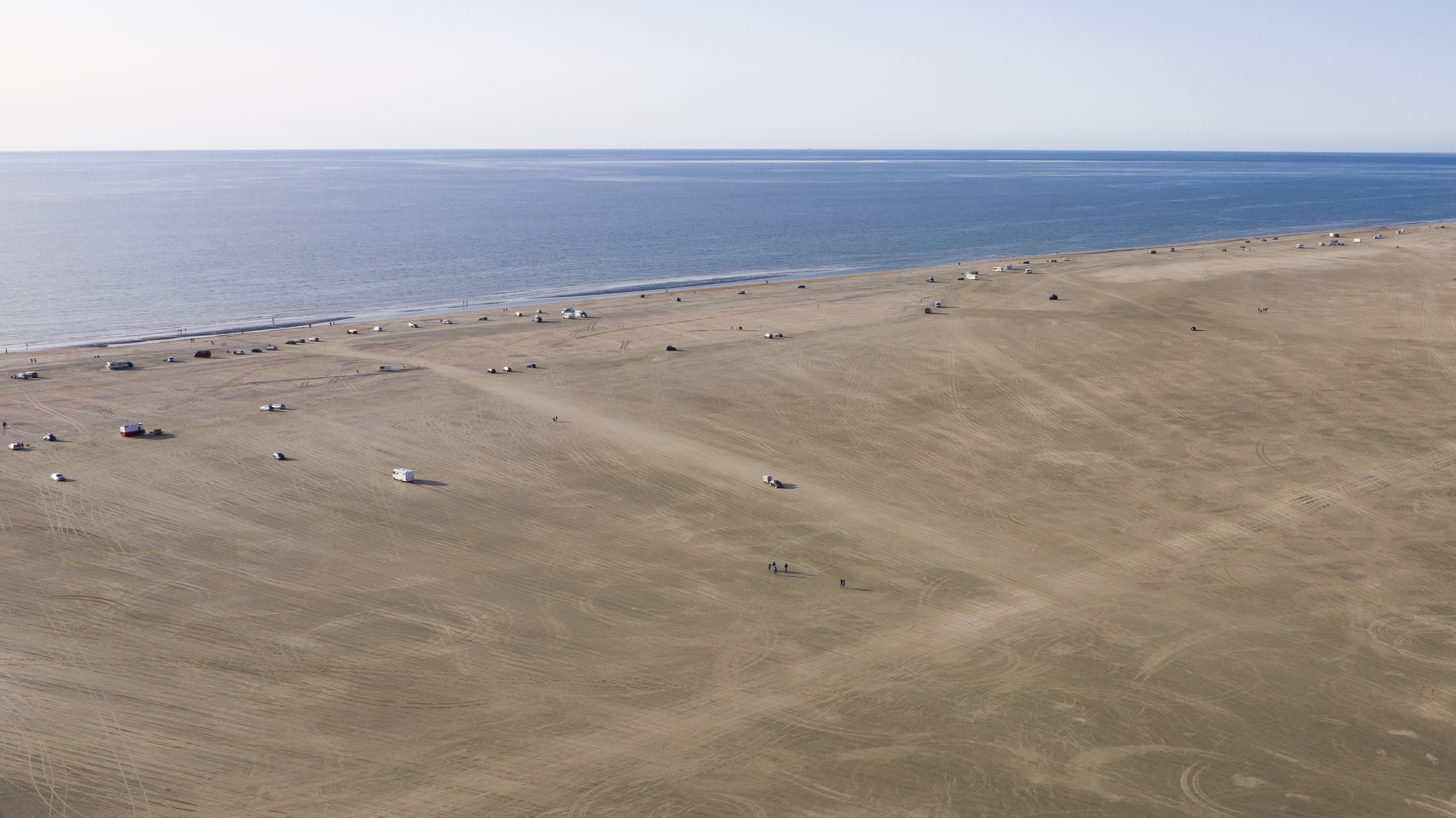
Rømø Beach

== Features ==
It is linked to the Danish mainland by a road running across a causeway, and the island lies about 3 km from the neighbouring German island Sylt, to which it is connected by ferry. It is home to a number of small communities such as Kongsmark, Østerby, Lakolk, and Sønderstrand.

=== St Clement's Church ===
St Clement's is the main church on the island. In the 19th century, the church allowed people to buy name plates for the church benches. Here the name of H.P.P. Møller, grandfather of the founder of the famous Danish Maersk shipping company, can still be seen on one of the front benches.

=== Kommandørgård Museum ===
The museum contains artefacts from the whaling industry, including a whale skeleton. The house is from 1770 and the barn and stable are from 1744. From 1784 to 1874 part of the manor was a school. "Kommandør" (commander) is an older term for a captain of a whaler.

=== Ferry to Sylt ===
The car ferry to the neighbouring (German) island of Sylt operates from Havneby by FRS Syltferry. It runs every hour and takes about 40 minutes.

=== The beach ===
Cars can legally be driven onto the beach. The southern beach is suitable for kitebuggying - a small vehicle is pulled at high speed pulled by a large, wind-blown kite. On the first weekend of September, one of the biggest kite festivals of Europe is held on Rømø. Rømø is a popular spot for tourists attracted by the nudist beaches.

== Notable people ==
- Peter Mærsk Møller (1836 in Rømø – 1927) was a sea captain who perhaps is best known as the father of Arnold Peter Møller, founder of the Maersk corporation,

== See also ==
- List of Danish islands
- Nearby islands: Mandø, Fanø, Sylt (German island).
- Nearby towns: Esbjerg, Ribe, Skærbæk, Tønder

== Works cited ==
- Munthe, Arnold [in Swedish] (1910). Klas Fleming, Karl Gustaf Wrangel, Martin Thijsen Anckarhielm, Danska kriget 1643–1645: Omfattande tiden till Juli 1644 [Klas Fleming, Carl Gustaf Wrangel, Martin Thijsen Anckarhielm, the Danish war 1643–1645: Covering the period until July 1644] (PDF). Svenska sjöhjältar (in Swedish). Vol. 5:1. Stockholm: P. A. Norstedt & Söners förlag.

== Gallery ==
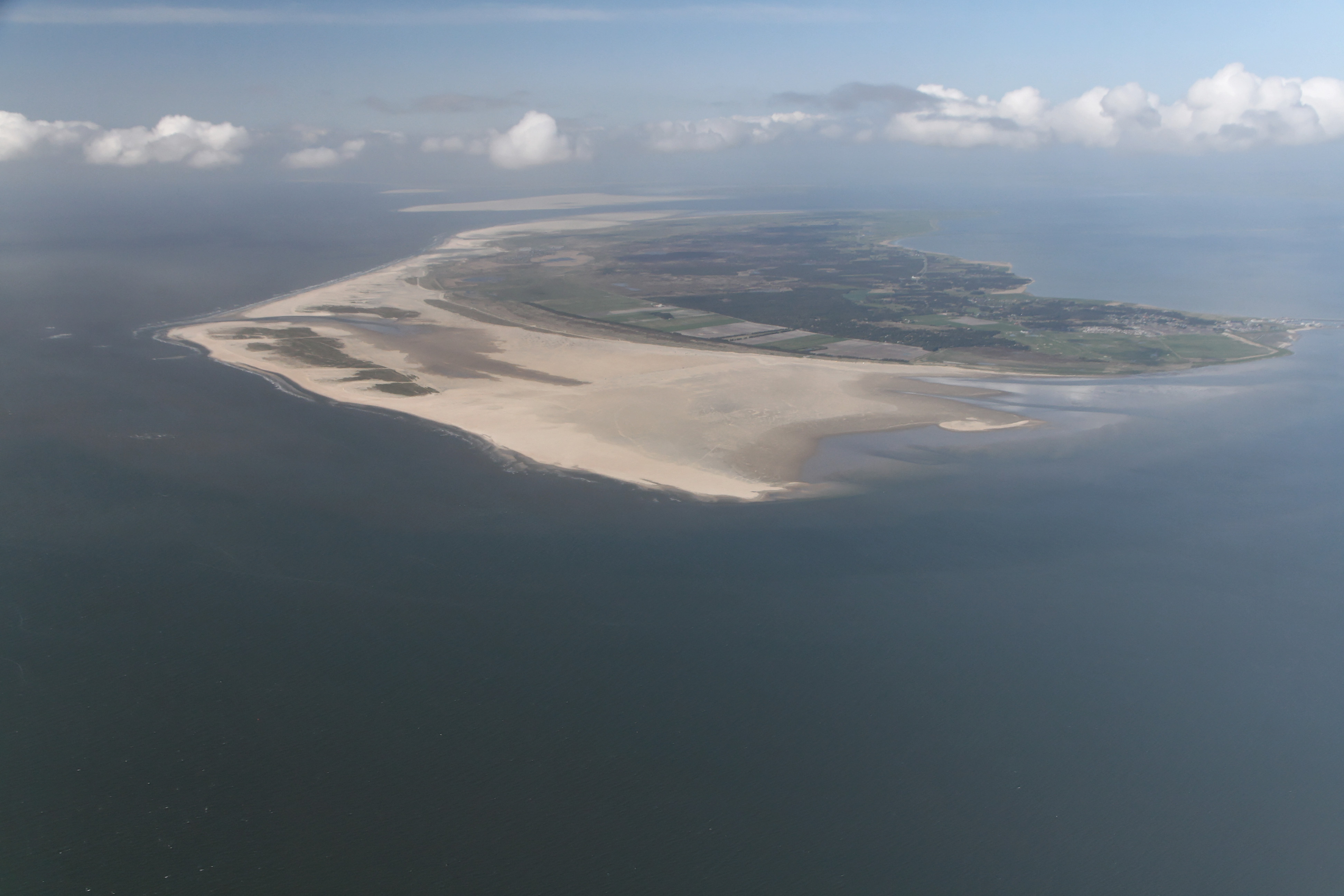
Aerial view

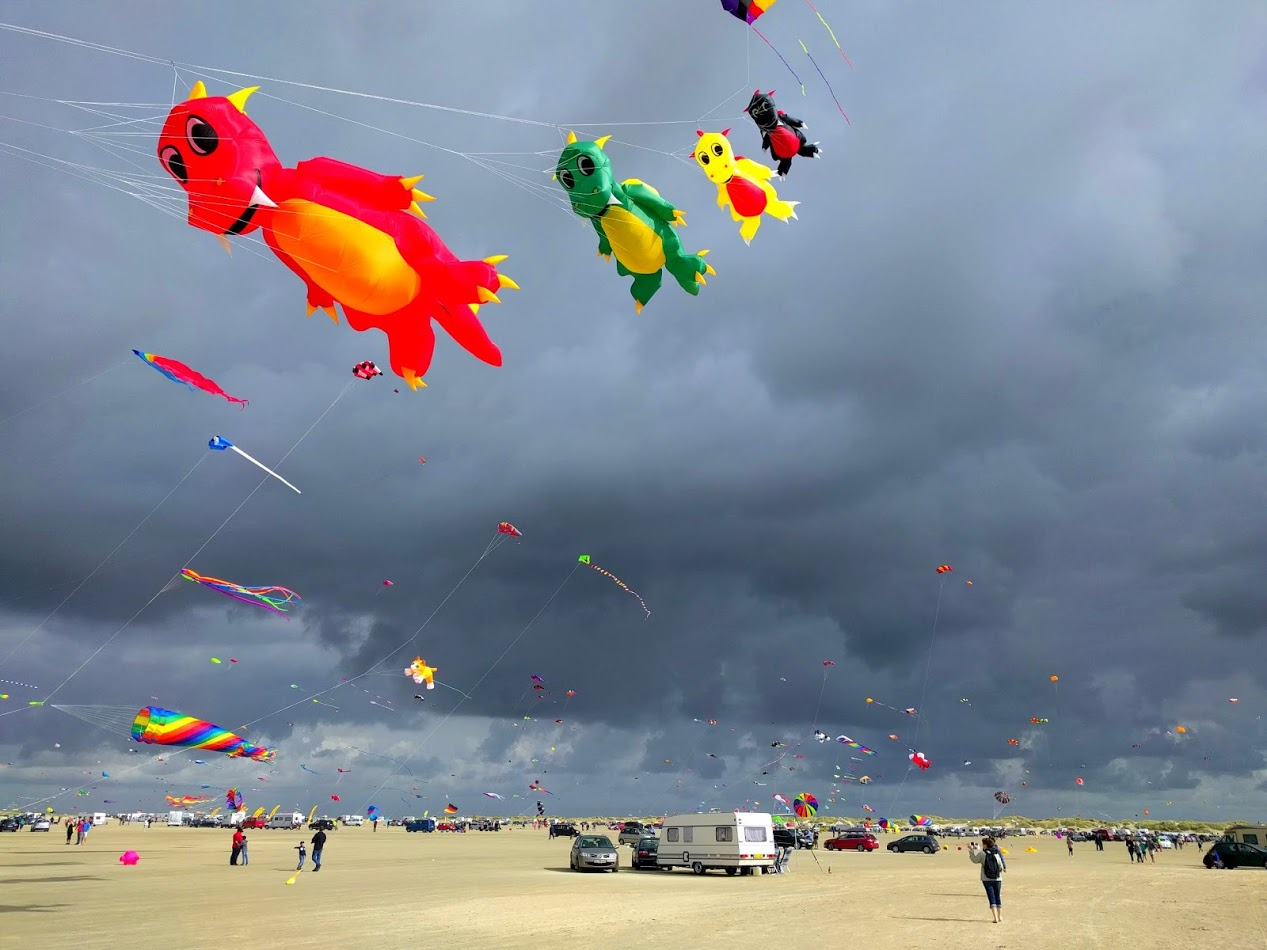
Rømø Kite Festival 2016

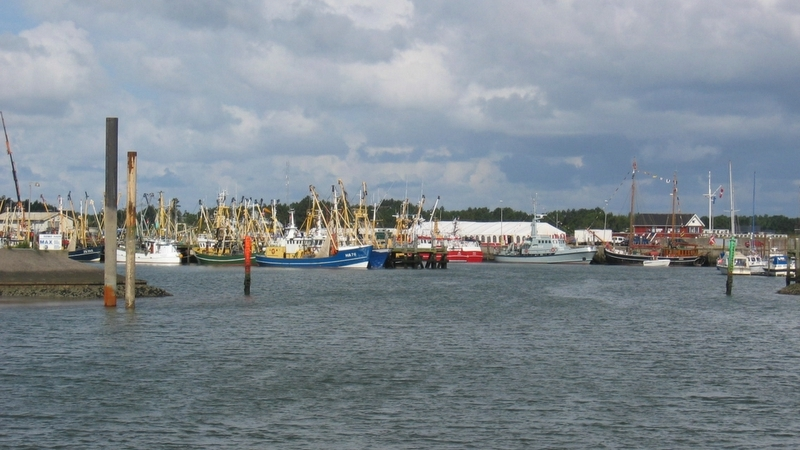
Harbour

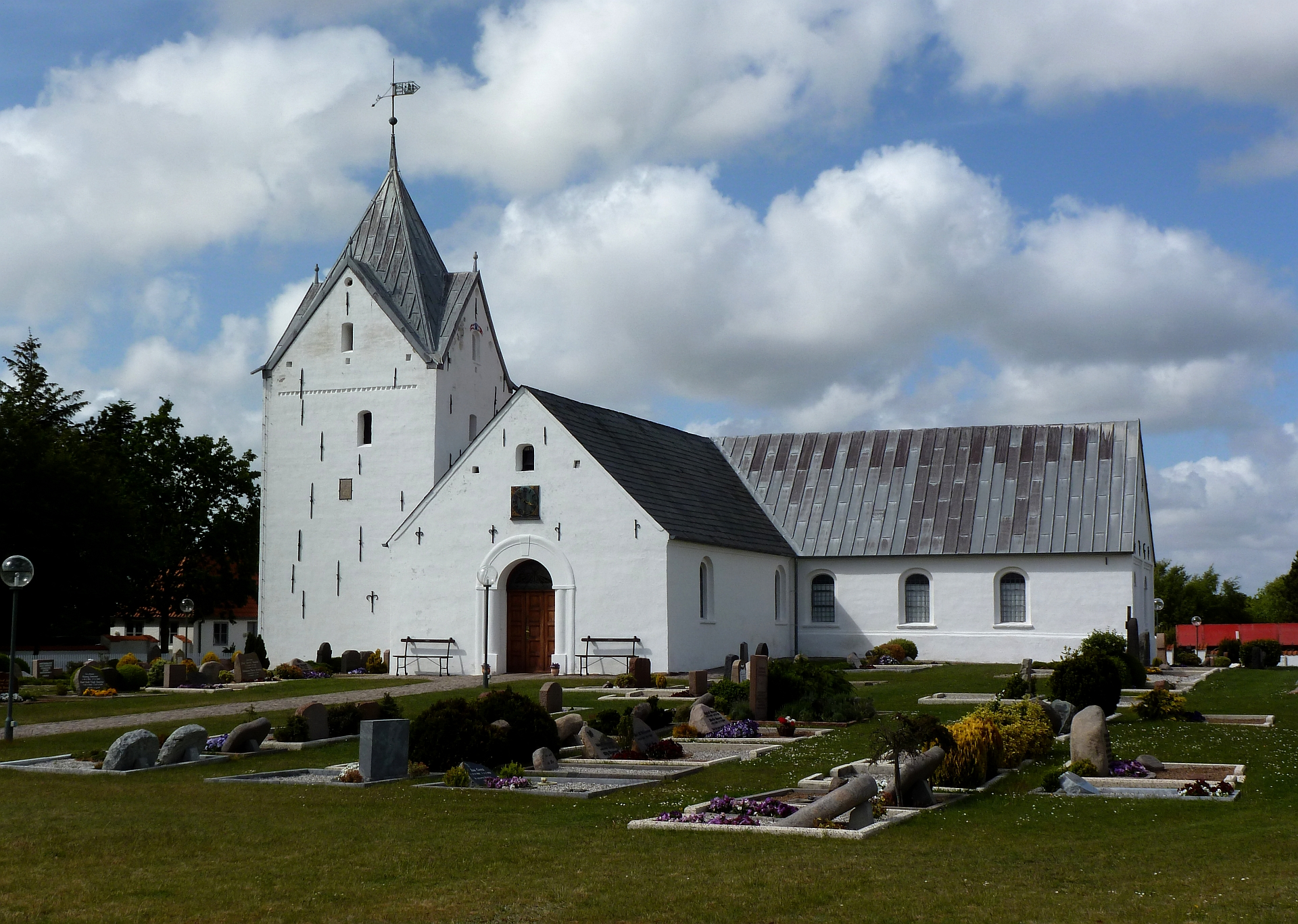
Saint Clements Church, Rømø

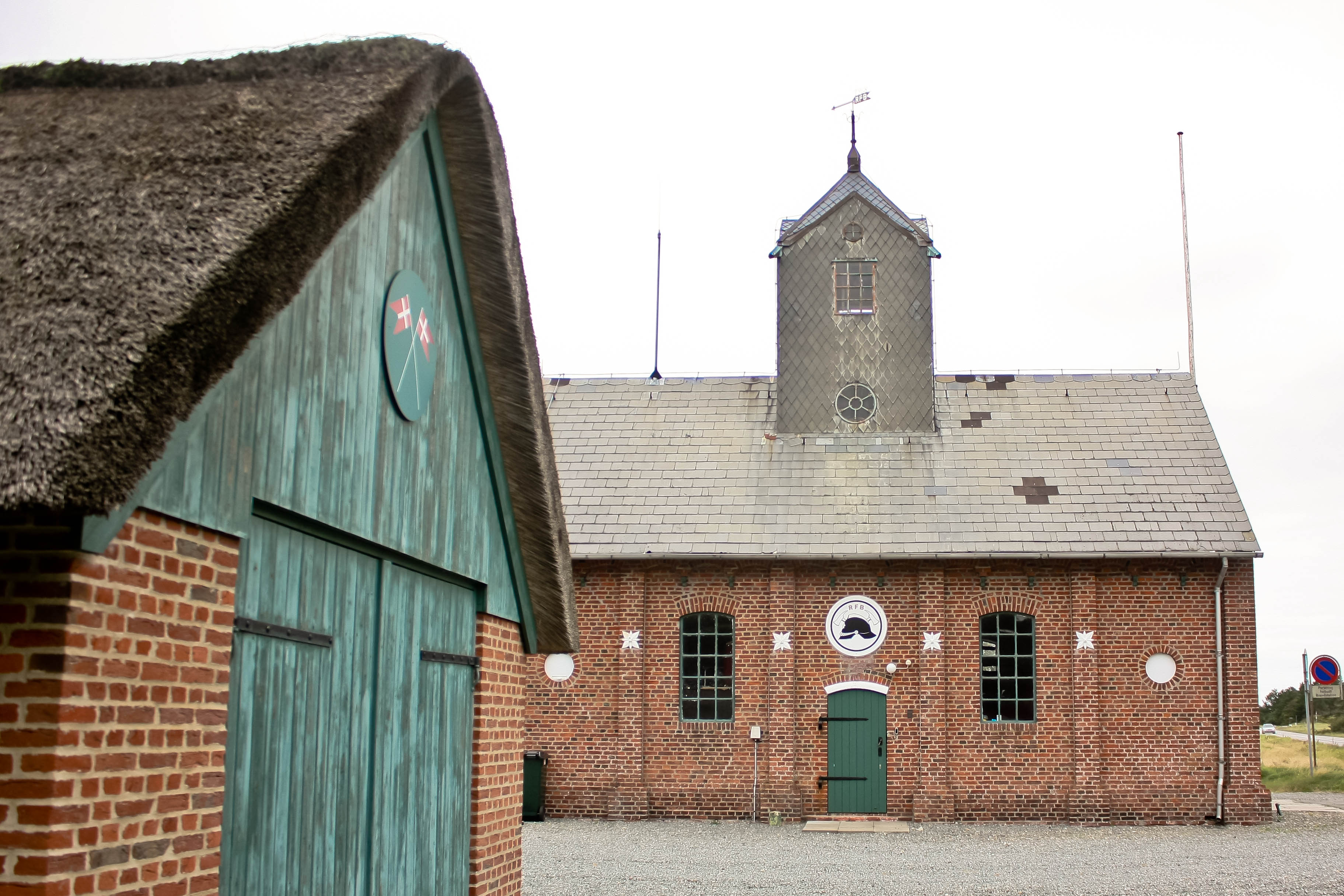
The Old Rescue Station

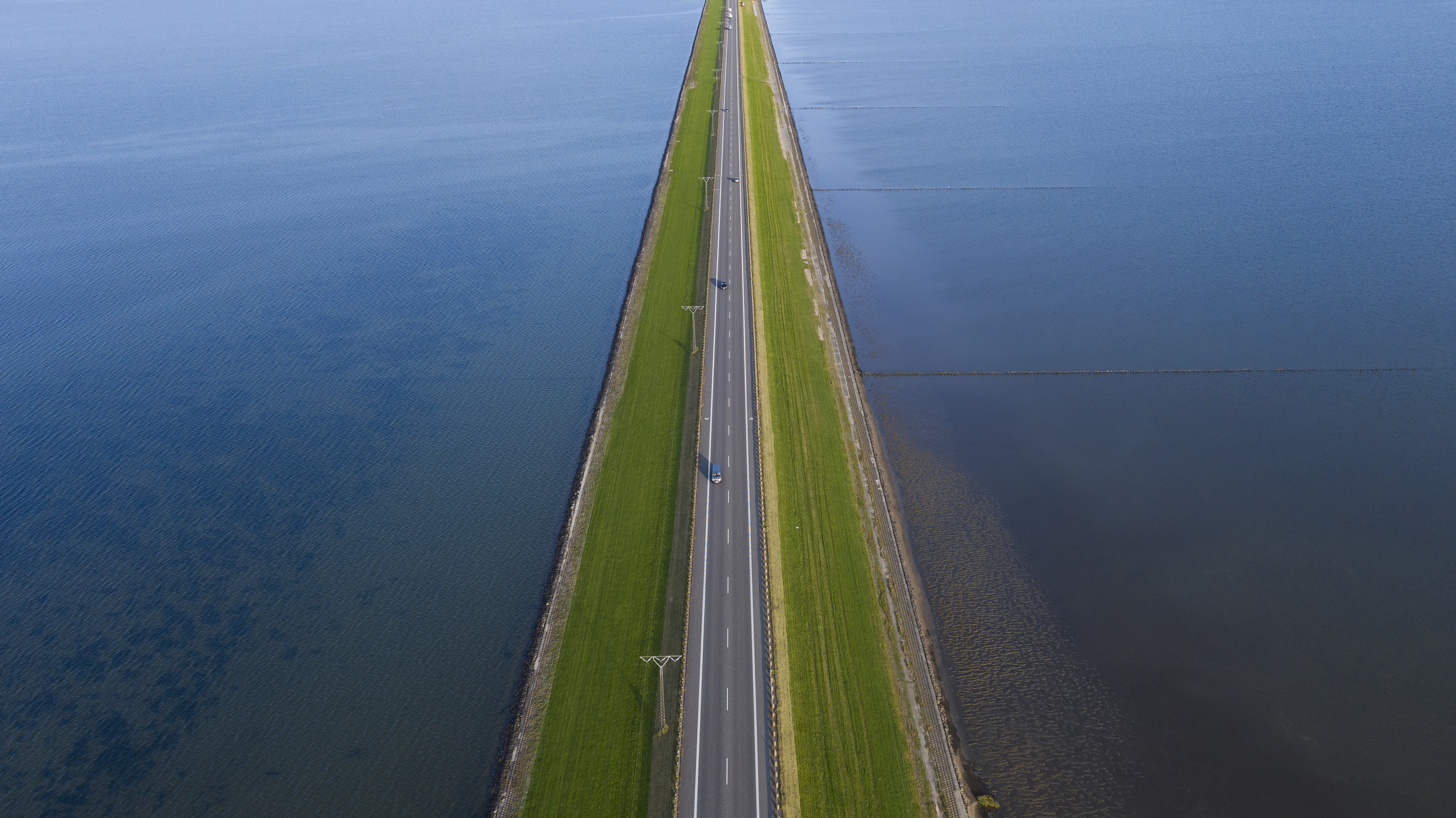
Causeway

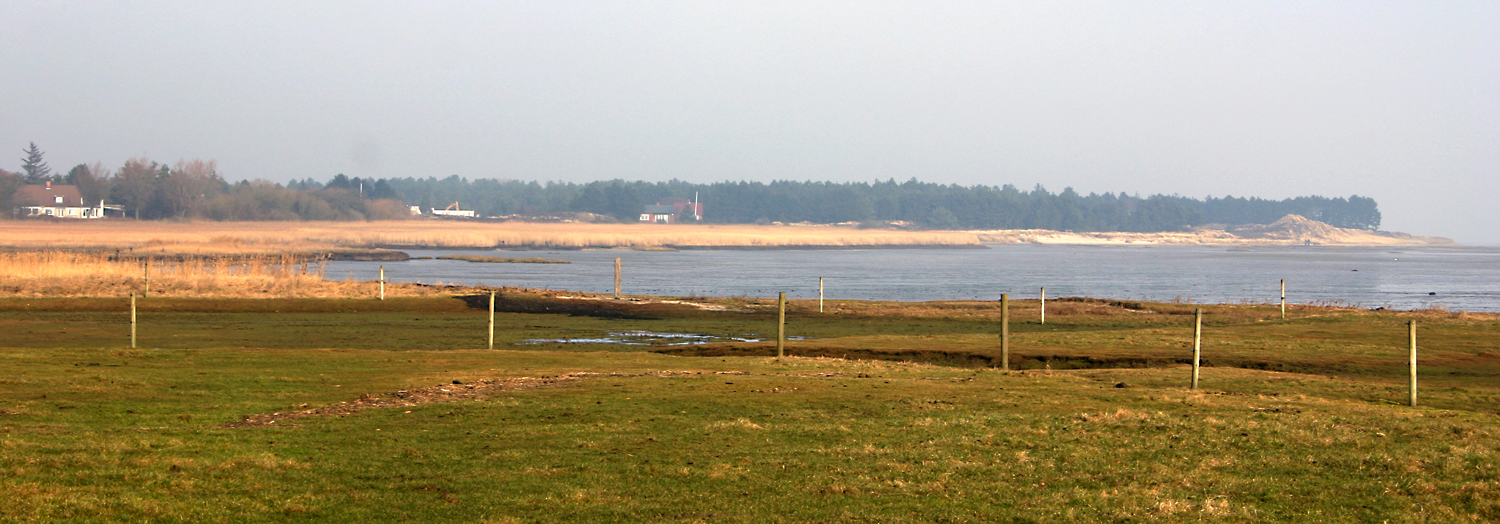
Shore

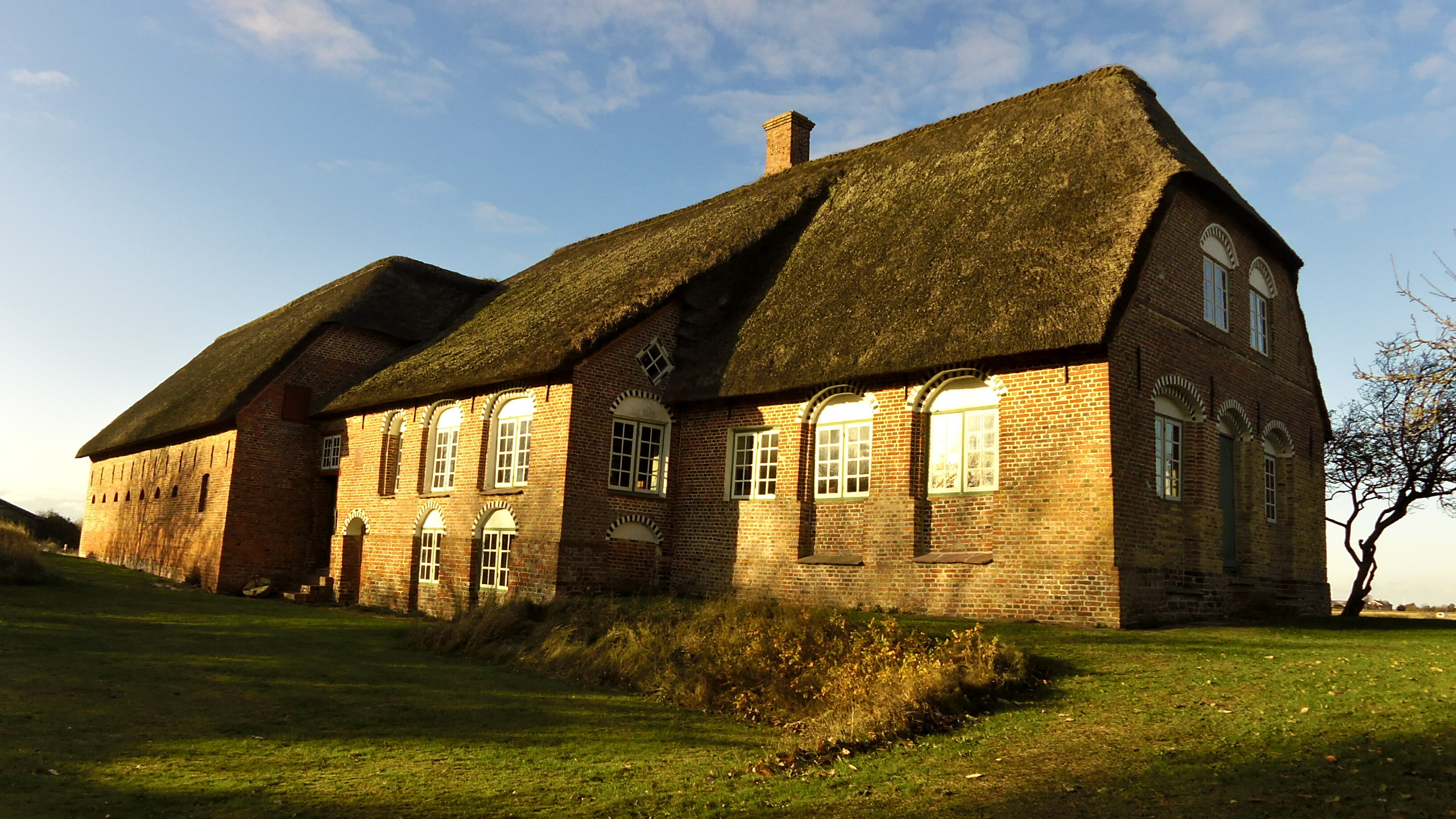
Kommandør Gården
