= Mandø =

Danish Wadden Sea island

Coordinates: 55°16′50″N 8°33′10″E

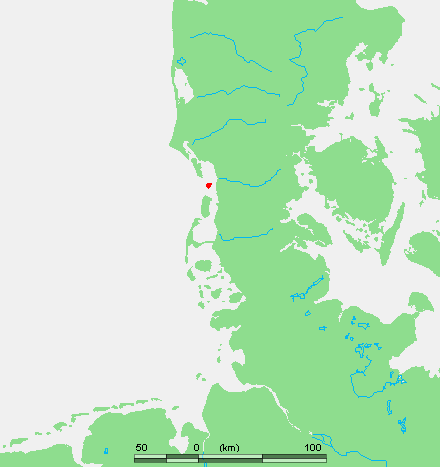
Location

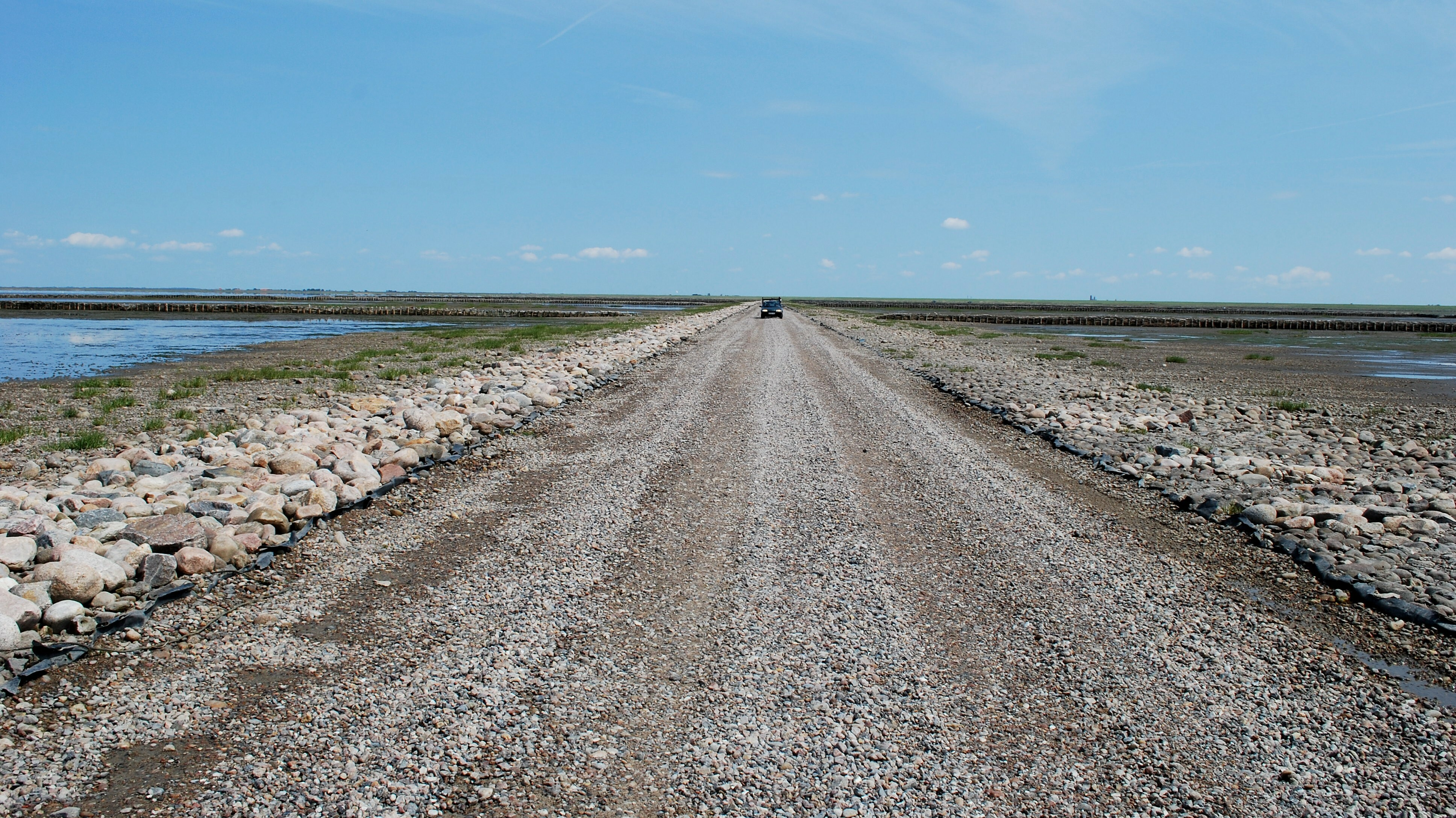
Causeway to Mandø

Mandø or Manø (Danish pronunciation: [mænøˀ]) is one of the Danish Wadden Sea islands off the southwest coast of Jutland, Denmark in the Wadden Sea, part of the North Sea. The island covers an area of 7.63 square kilometres (2.95 square miles) and had between 27-31 inhabitants in January 2022. The island is part of Esbjerg Municipality and is situated approximately 12 kilometres (7 miles) southwest of the ancient town of Ribe.

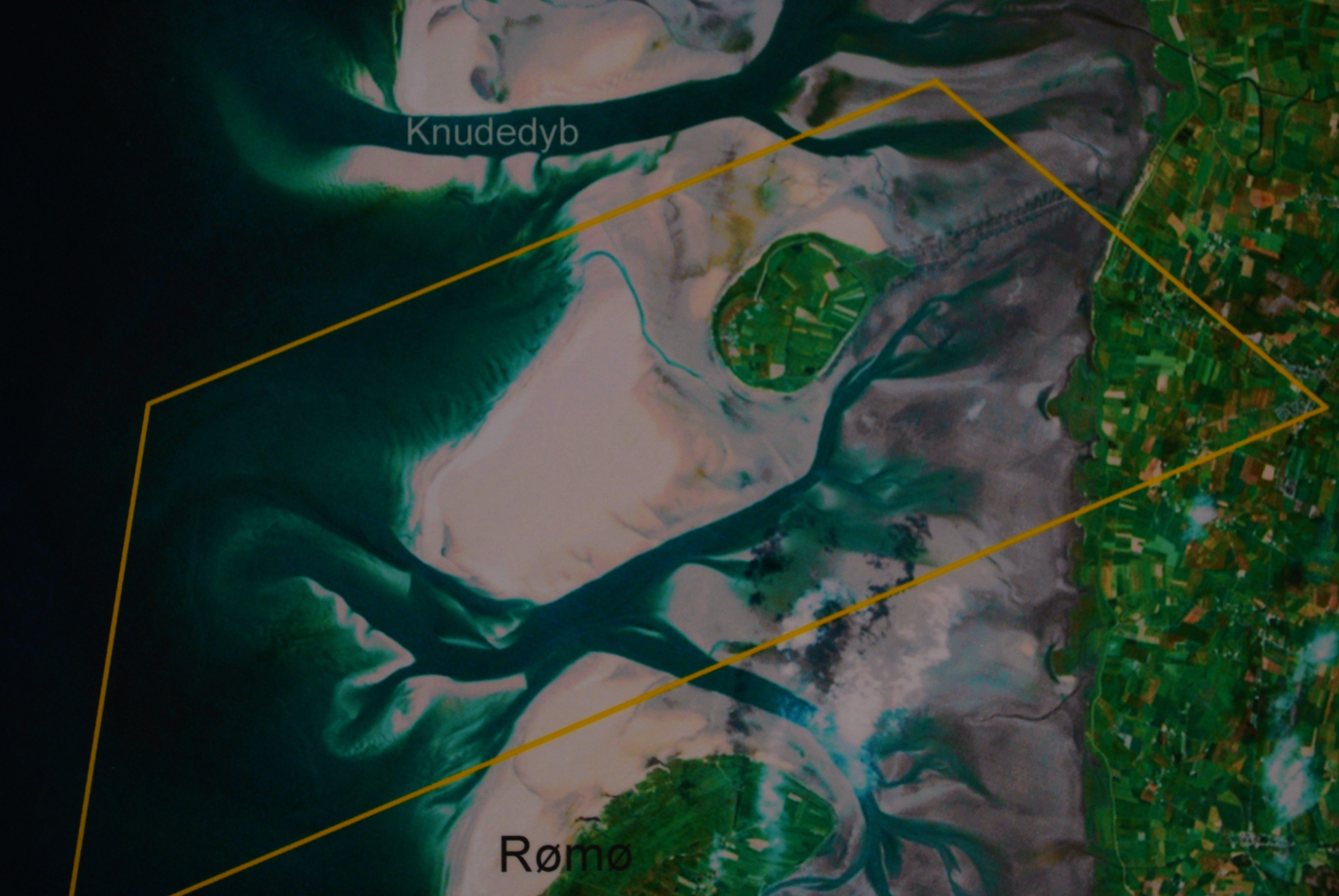
Mandø.Denmark.3

Mandø is barely accessible by road at high tide over an unpaved surface level causeway of about four kilometers in length that connects the island to the mainland. Low tide transit is possible. Extensive mudflats and tidal marshes encircle the island and provide breeding areas to multitudes of birds and other organisms. In the past centuries several large earthen dikes have been constructed around the perimeter of the island, although substantially set back from the shoreline. This artifice has allowed conventional farming in the form of grain growing and sheep grazing. Mandø is technically a hallig, although it is far from the ten German islands commonly described by that term. The name was formerly often spelled Manø.

== Logistics of access ==
Conventional motor vehicles can access Mandø Island via a causeway, an unpaved roadway, although this route is compromised in storms at high tide. The nearest village on the mainland which is the gateway to Mandø Island is Vester Vedsted. This simple causeway road is no more than copious gravel laid down on an immense mudflat, with required frequent periodic maintenance of added gravels. Alternatively many visitors reach the island by way of a specially designed tractor-pulled bus with greatly oversized tires. This vehicle is capable of traversing some of the firmer mudflats, but only at the lowest tides. In any case private vehicles or the "Mandø bus" leave the mainland at the point of the Wadden Sea Centre, which offers nature information and boasts a small museum devoted to the natural history of Mandø. Mandø is located midway between the two larger islands Fanø and Rømø which are connected to the mainland by a ferry and a road running across a causeway, respectively.

== Geology and regional setting ==
Mandø is geographically one of the northernmost islands among the North Frisian Islands off the southwestern Danish and northwestern German coast. The Frisian Islands are generally the line of demarcation separating the North Sea from the Wadden Sea, which is a shallow sea of approximately 5,000 square kilometers in size, riddled with small islands and tidal flats. The entire Wadden Sea area was formed by intervening riverine depositional periods between Ice Age glacier movements and the island consists of sedimentary deposits and sand.

== Ecology ==
The principal ecosystems on this island are: tidal marsh; mudflat; littoral zone; and upland grassland. In fact, there is about as much land area in mudflats as the considerable arable land of the island. Mandø Island is known for its extensive birdlife. Breeding birds consist of terns, sandpipers, many waders and ducks including eiders. Mudflats and marshes afford birds a safe and undisturbed location for feeding, resting and breeding.

There are also a variety of insects, marine organisms and small mammals that find habitat on this island. Many grasses and wildflowers populate the upland portion of the island, in addition to marsh grasses in the intertidal zone. Besides the indigenous wildlife there are sheep which are grazed on the island and along part of the causeway.

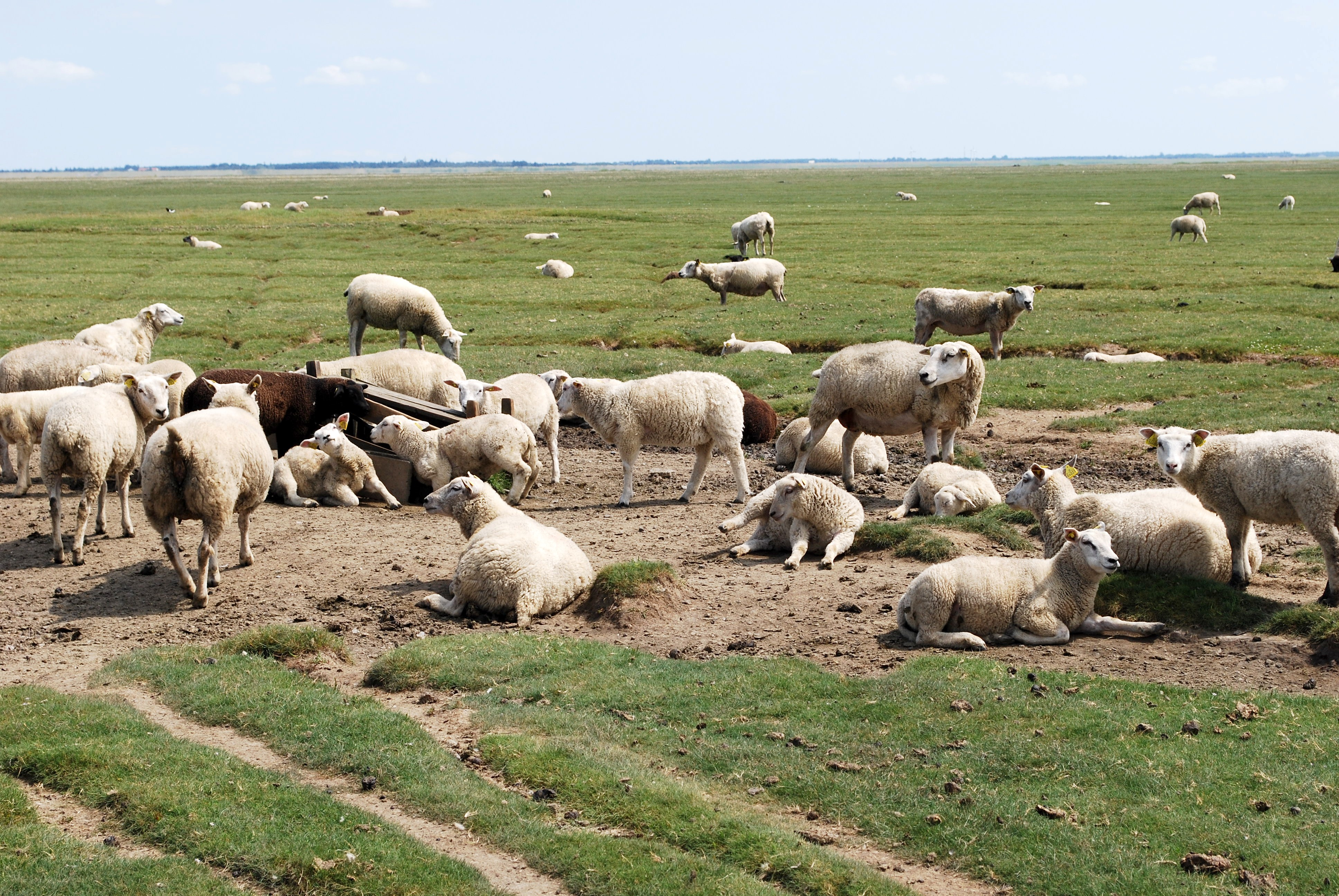
Sheep grazing on Mandø

== History ==
The first written record of Mandø dates from 1231. but it is believed people lived there before then, with archaeological remains of Gammel Mandø village, located close to the mainland causeway. In 1558, a violent storm surge raged, and the town of Mandø, which was then located on the northernmost part of Mandø island, was destroyed. The storm surge "split" Mandø into two larger islands at the so-called "Store Lo", and the residents built their new houses on the southernmost of the two islands, "New Mandø", near the current settlement on dunes to the western side. Accretion and dikes have joined them again.

There was a further flood event on 11 October 1634. A 1909 storm surge was only 5 cm from going over the seawall. The years 1909, 1911, 1923, 1928, 1936, 1968, 1976, 1981, and 1999 saw extensive flooding, as marked on a post on the island. Among many storm floods, a dyke known as Bydiget ('village dyke') was constructed in 1887 east of the main settlement, its predecessor having been built largely by women, when men were away at sea. A second one, Havnediget ('harbour dyke'), was constructed in 1937 protecting the northern part of the island, Gammel Mandø ('Old Mandø'). Both dykes were breached in a flood in 1981. Surges are now severe enough to threaten livelihoods and properties.

The meaning of the original name Mannæø or Mannø is disputed. According to one interpretation the name means the Isle of Men. It has also been interpreted as relating to a burial site for victims of shipwrecks. A number of islands in Sweden have similar names with this meaning. A third interpretation explains it as derived from the name Manni.

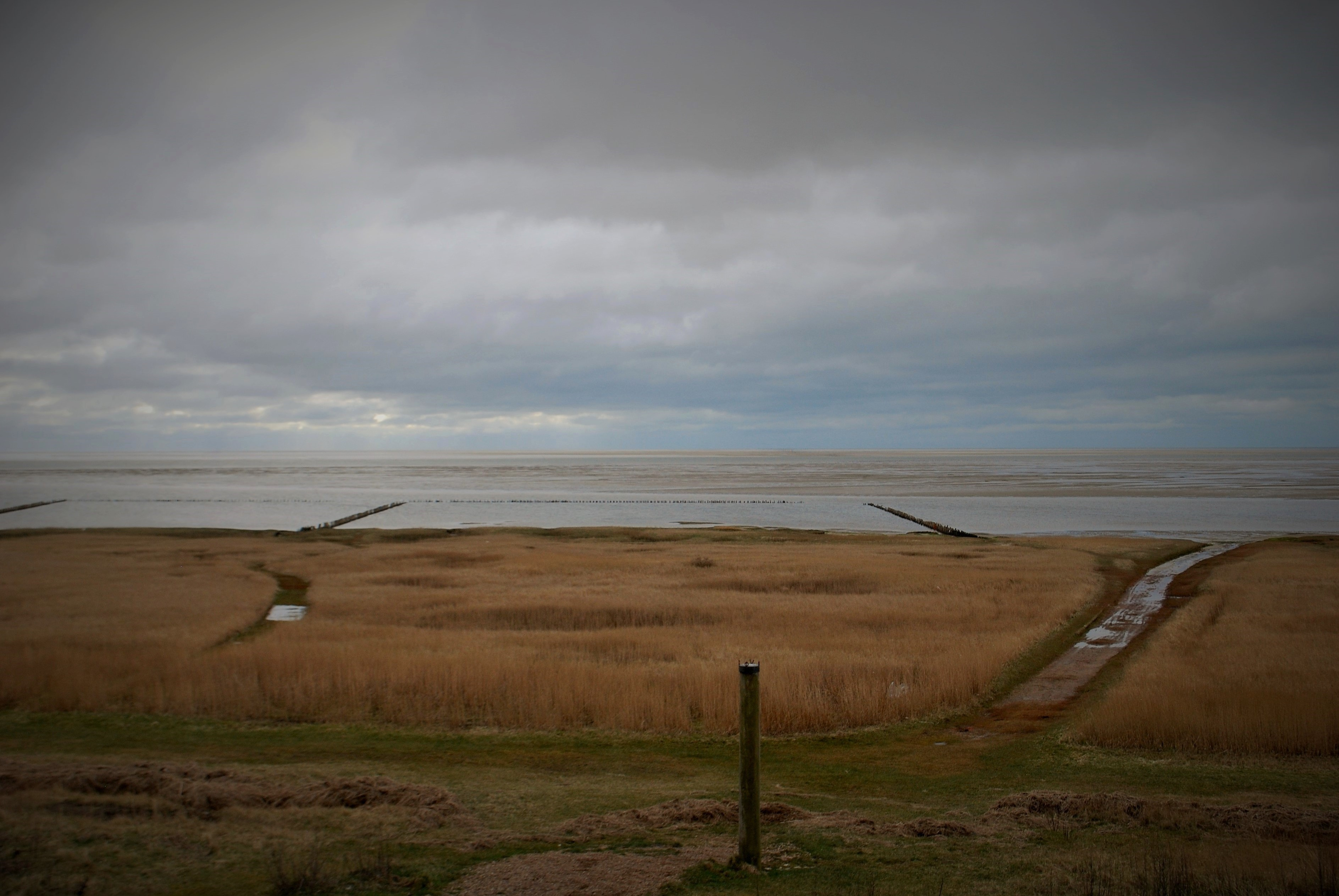
Mandø.Denmark.11

A local archival source, Avia Ripensis (Danish: Ribe Oldemoder), mentions the existence of a local church in 1340. In the 16th and 17th century, storm surges destroyed the first two churches, and the current, whitewashed church dates to 1639 (restored in 1727). It was built on the highest point of the dunes. The island belonged to the royal demesne until 1741 when the islanders purchased it at auction. Mandø remains sparsely populated compared to the neighbouring islands, Fanø and Rømø.

The population has generally declined over decades and centuries. It was 97 in 1860, 244 in 1870 (following the effects of the Prussian war), and the census of 1890 records the island's population as 262, a number which dwindled by 2023 to c. 27.

Life on the island was first supported by a combination of agriculture and fishing. Fishing was the responsibility of the island's men and agriculture was managed by the women. Until the 18th century, none of the island's fields were enclosed. Residents often experienced that an early autumn storm surge washed away the entire hay harvest. In 1652 there were approx. 130 people, and since it was difficult to make a living from agriculture alone, some of the residents began to fish. The island was later associated with seafaring. From the middle of the 18th century to around 1900, shipping was important and men took jobs as sailors, helmsmen and captains on ships around the world.

In the 20th century, agriculture became the dominant activity again. At its peak, the number of farms was 25, a number dwindling to a single one by 1997. The dairy closed in 1971. In World War II the island was under German occupation, with a German air traffic control station. It had a wooden tower with binoculars, and the crew lived in barracks. Mandø was also used as a recreation site for German soldiers who had been on the Eastern Front during the war. In 1952, Mandø got its own electricity plant. Until then, the inhabitants had used kerosene lamps. The electricity plant was closed in 1971, when an electric cable was laid from the mainland to the island. In 1978, a water pipeline was buried from the mainland to the island.

Tourists visit mainly in the summer months, with up to approx. 80,000 one-day tourists per year. Aside from 14 lodgings there is a campsite, hotel & restaurant (Vadehavet), cafe (Café Mandøpigen) and one shop. On 18 June 2010, a tractor-drawn tourist vehicle overturned in a one meter wide, 50 cm deep hole in the Wadden Sea between Mandø and Koresand. Three were killed and 36 were injured. It appears from one research study that conflicts exist among the residents, tourists, and some departed islanders who retain holiday homes.

== Media ==
A novel by Kjersti Vik (b. 1974) entitled Mandø was published in 2009, and describes the petty intrigues and struggles of a group of friends holidaying on the island, with reference to the mudflats and sea level rise.

A 2023 movie produced by Elk Films, As the Tide Comes In (Før stormen, 1h 28m) by Juan Palacios and Sofie Husum Johannesen shows the struggles of the remaining 27 islanders, focussing on the oldest and the youngest (in his 40s), with rising sea levels as a storm surge advances. One review says "Impressively, the film walks that delicate line of both celebrating Mando as an entirely unique place, an island lost in time, and holding it up as a King Canute-esque symbol for humanity’s ongoing fight to hold back the tide."

== Notable natives ==
- Eugenius Warming (1841–1924), recognized as a major founding figure of the scientific discipline of Ecology, was born and lived until about the age of three on the island.
- Villum Kann Rasmussen, (Danish Wiki) (1909–1993), construction engineer and businessman, founder of the roof windows company VELUX, was born and lived in Mandø until 1927 when he moved to Sorø, on Zealand to continue his education. Later in life Rasmussen established various foundations to support social and cultural initiatives, as granting scholarships to inhabitants of Mandø.

== Gallery ==
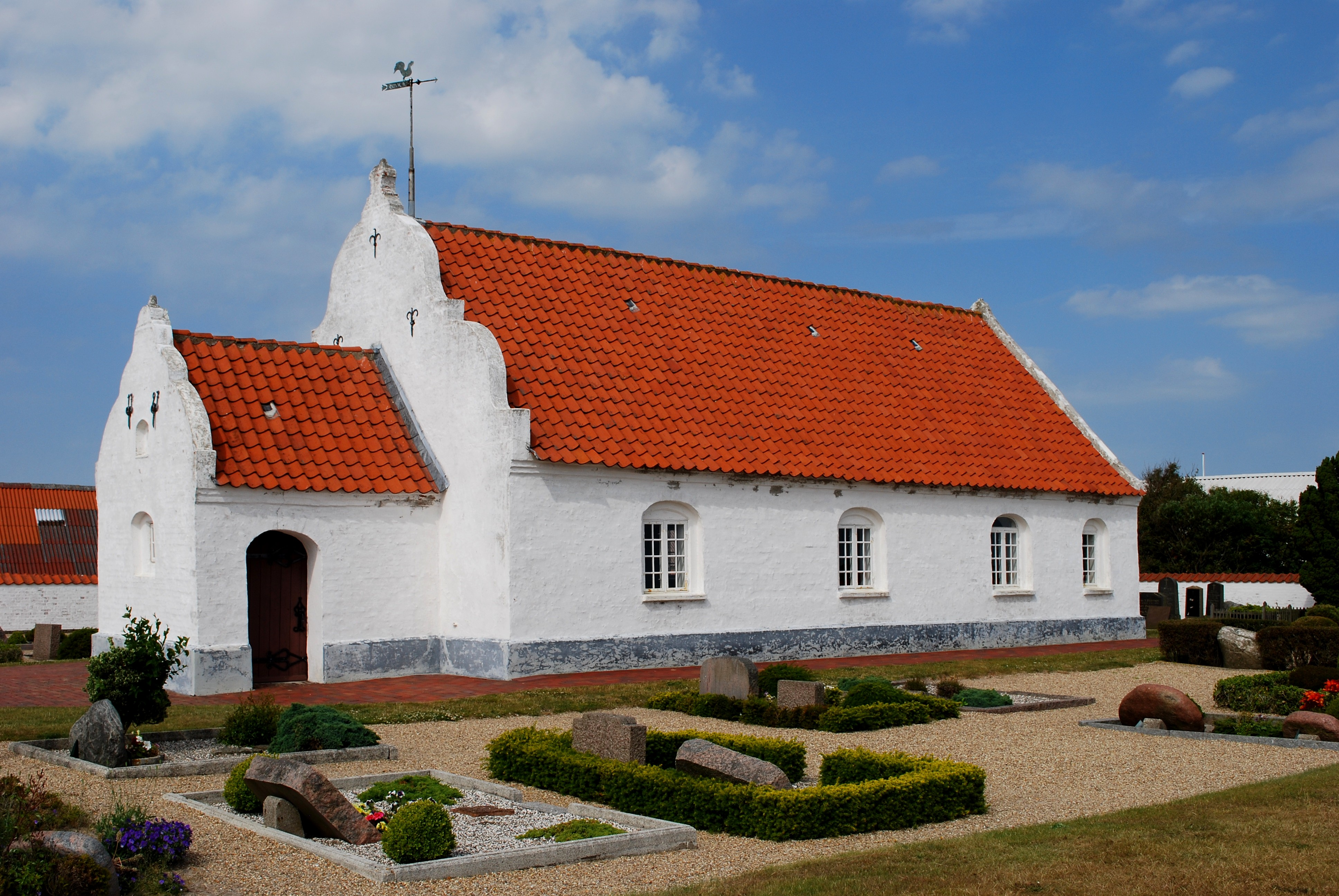
Mandø Kirke

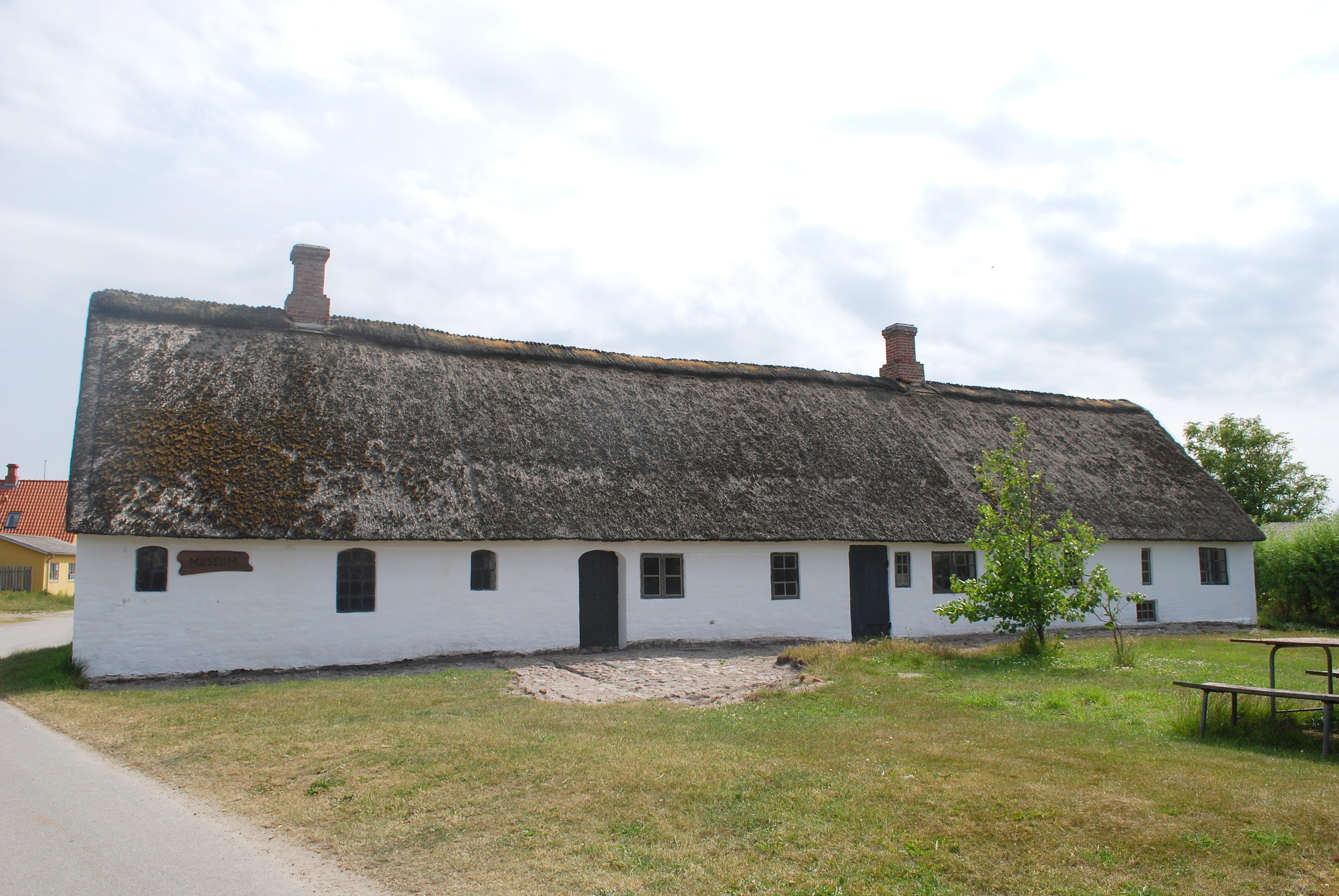
Mandø Museum

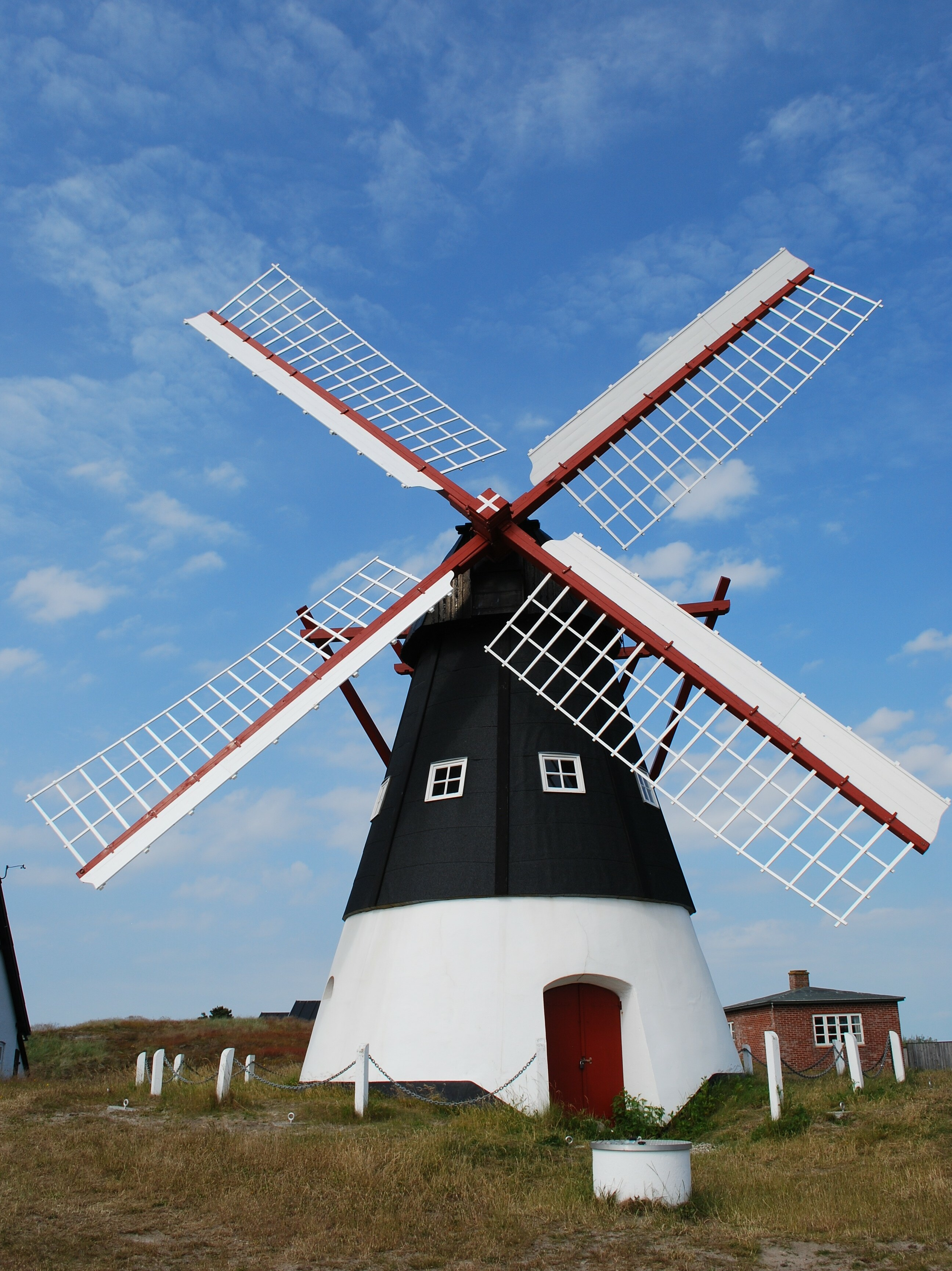
Mandø Mølle

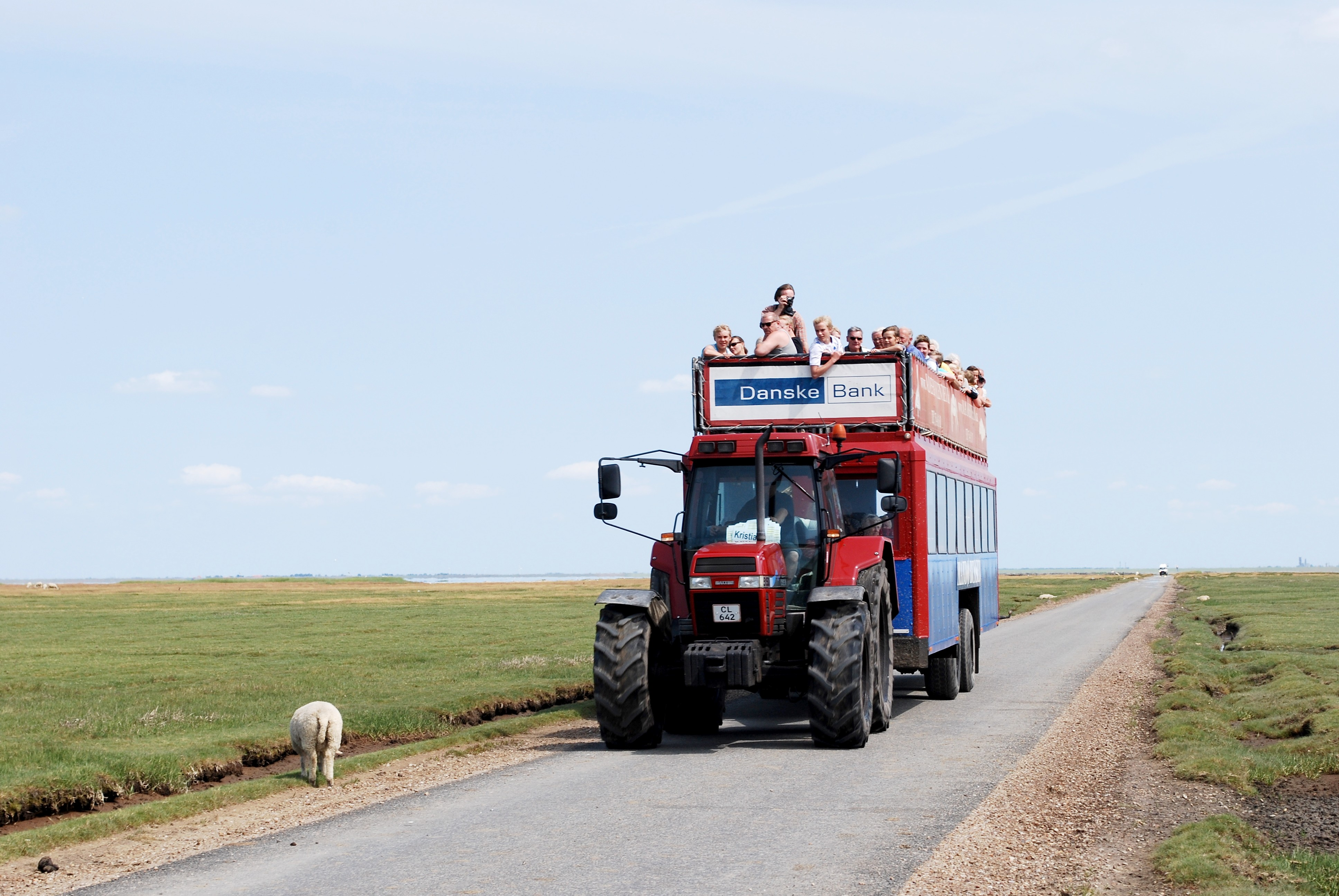
Mandøbussen

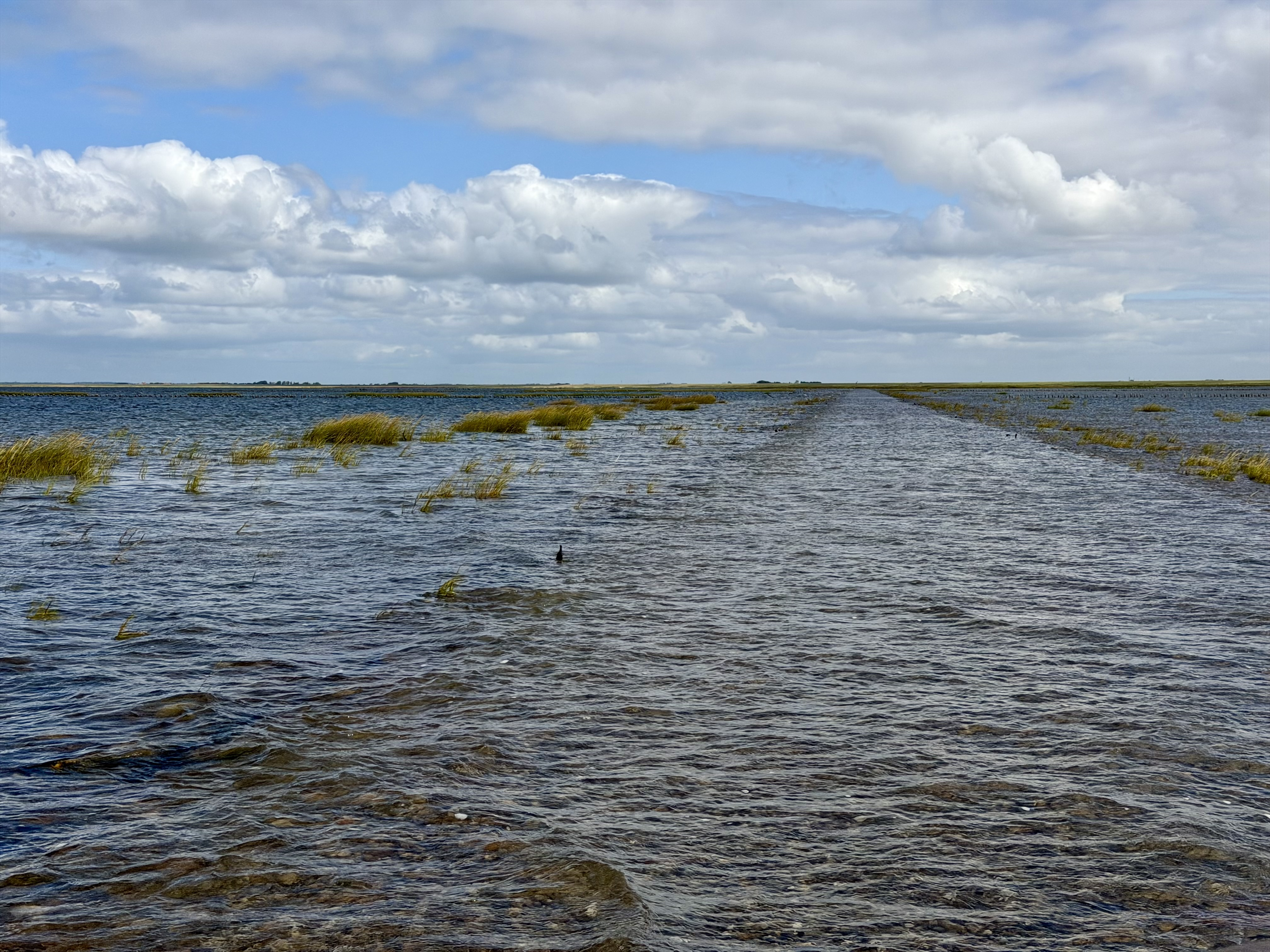
Låningsvejen causeway at high tide

== See also ==
- Bay mud
- Halligen
