= Koresand =

Sandbank in the Wadden Sea, Denmark

Coordinates: 55°15′N 8°29′E

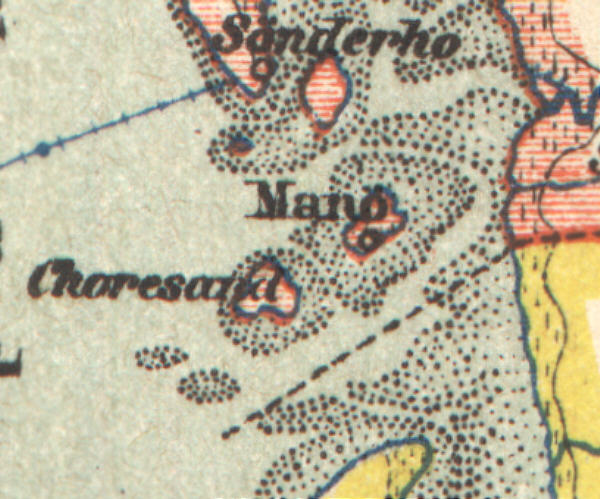
Map of Koresand and the surrounding islands.

Koresand is a sandbank in the Wadden Sea off the coast of Jutland in Denmark. The island has an approximate area of 20–30 km^{2} (7.7–11.6 sq mi). At high tide, Koresand is an island, however at low tide the sandbank is connected to Mandø and the mainland.
