= Sail bogey =

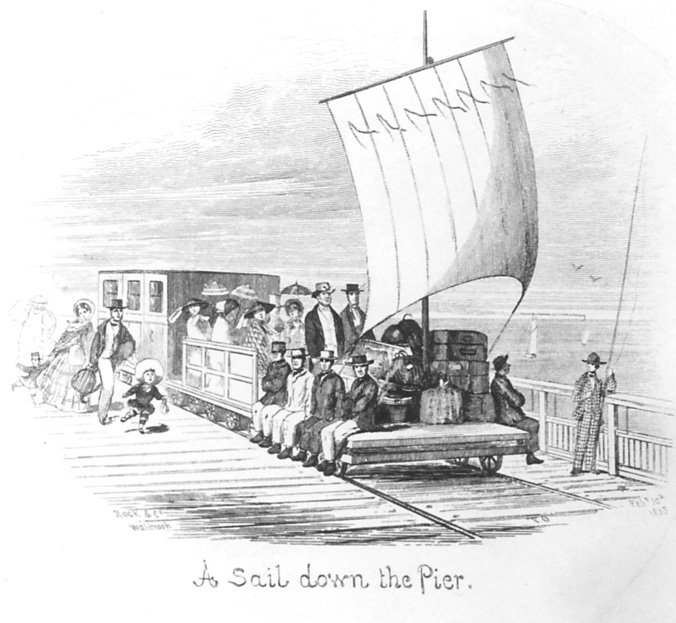
Sail bogey at Herne Bay Pier 1855

A sail bogey or sail trolley is a wind-driven vehicle that runs along railway tracks.

== Examples ==
=== Spurn railway ===
The Spurn railway, built along Spurn Head on the Yorkshire coast of England was built in the First World War and ran until the early 1950s and included sail bogies as part of its rolling stock.

=== Teesmouth lifeboat ===
In the early days of the Teesmouth lifeboat, its crew were sometimes able, subject to wind conditions, to travel out to the lifeboat station at South Gare on a sail bogey.

=== Madaras Rotor Power Plant Project ===
In the 1930s, the US government investigated using rotating vertically mounted cylinders (90-ft tall by 22.2-ft Dia) mounted on a rake of flatcars in a closed loop on a circular track to generate electricity. The project, known as the "Madaras Rotor Power Plant", used the Magnus Effect to transfer the wind energy into thrust to accelerate the "Train" whilst alternators fitted to the axles of the flatcars generated electricity which was fed back to the system through a trolley system.

=== Others ===
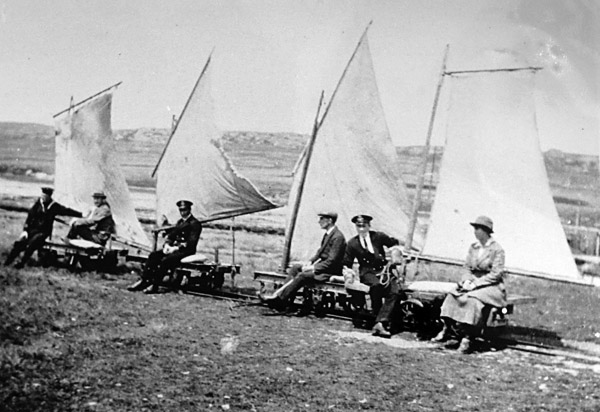
Camber Railway: sail-driven waggons with balanced lug, standing lug and gaff rigs

Other locations to have used sail bogies include:

- Cliffe, Kent
- Dundee and Newtyle Railway
- Gosport
- Herne Bay Pier, Kent
- Camber Railway near Port Stanley, The Falkland Islands
- the Dagebüll–Oland–Langeneß island railway, connecting the town of Dagebüll with the Halligen Oland and Langeneß, Germany

== Replica ==
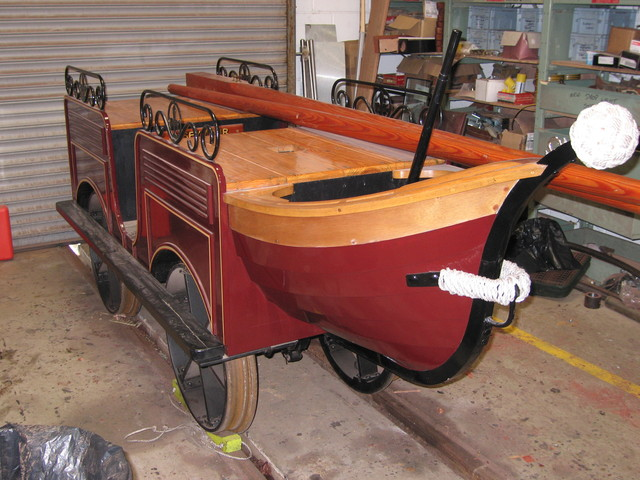
Ffestiniog Railway: Replica of Spooner's boat

More recently, in 2005, a replica of a 19th-century sail bogey was built and demonstrated on the Ffestiniog Railway in North Wales.

== See also ==
- Draisine
