= Dagebüll Lighthouse =

Lighthouse in Schleswig-Holstein, Germany

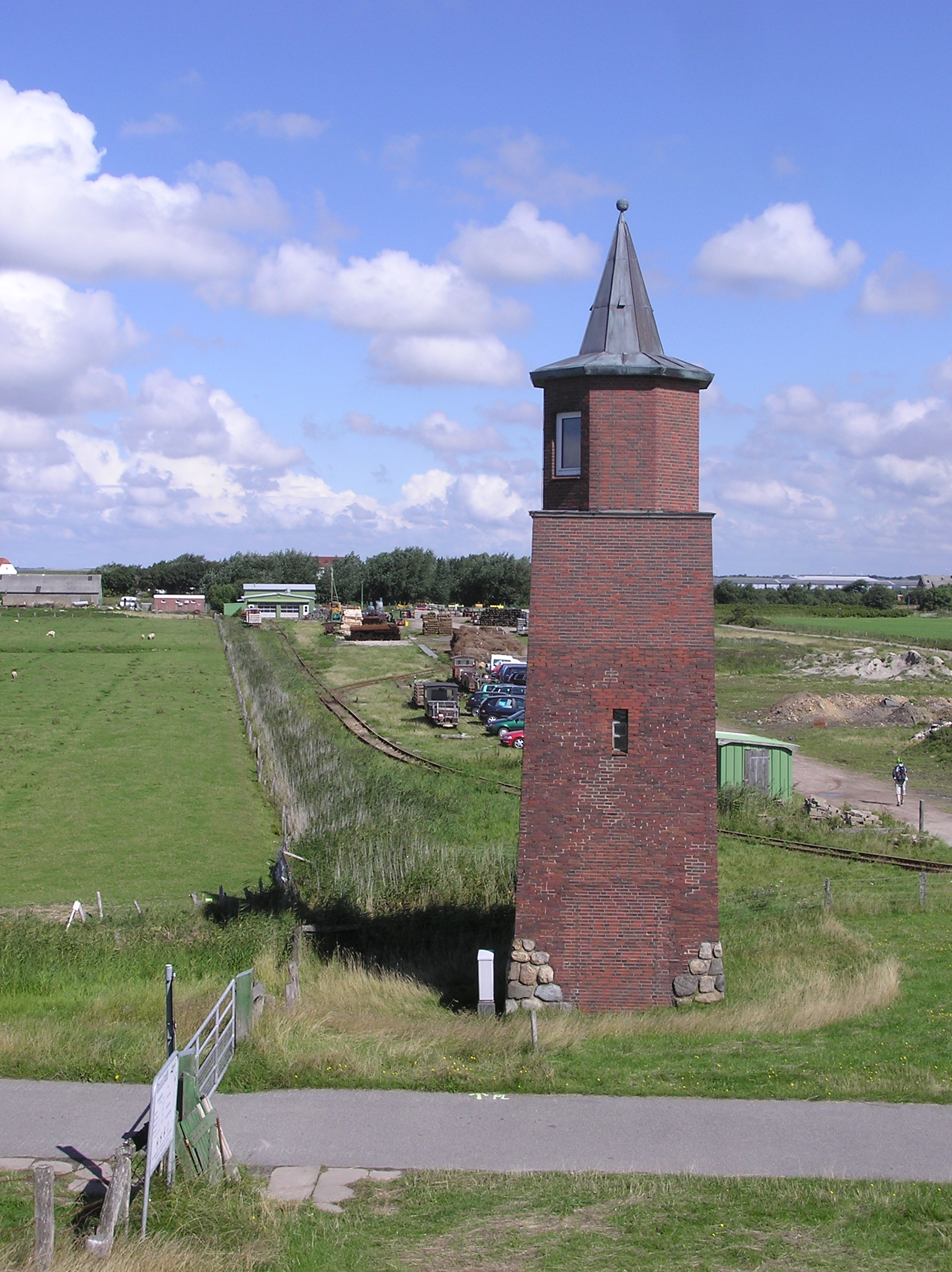
- Location: Dagebüll, Nordfriesland district, Germany
- Coordinates: 54°43′31″N 8°41′59.5″E

Tower
- Constructed: 1929
- Foundation: 36 wooden poles.
- Construction: bricks tower
- Height: 15.20 metres (50 ft)
- Shape: square tower with octagonal lantern and pyramidal roof lantern
- Markings: unpainted red brick tower with black and green pitched roof.

Light
- Deactivated: 1988
- Focal height: 10.30 metres (34 ft)
- Range: 17 nautical miles (31 km; 20 mi)
- Characteristic: ISO 4 s

Dagebüll Lighthouse is a retired lighthouse in Dagebüll, Nordfriesland, Germany. Until its replacement in 1988 by a direction light on the dock of the Dagebüll ferry port, it served as the lower light of the Dagebüll range of leading lights. The lighthouse is situated in the southern part of the municipality near the depot of the lorry rail to islands of Oland and Langeneß. After an additional storey was added to the tower due to a raise of the sea dike in 1980, the tower is now 12.5 m (41 ft) tall. Its focal height is at 10.3 m (34 ft) above the highest high tide. The lighthouse has a pitched roof, a black and green copper construction.

As of 2018, the tower is being used as a hotel room for 2 guests.

== See also ==
- List of lighthouses and lightvessels in Germany
