= Oland Lighthouse =

Lighthouse in Schleswig-Holstein, Germany

Oland lighthouse
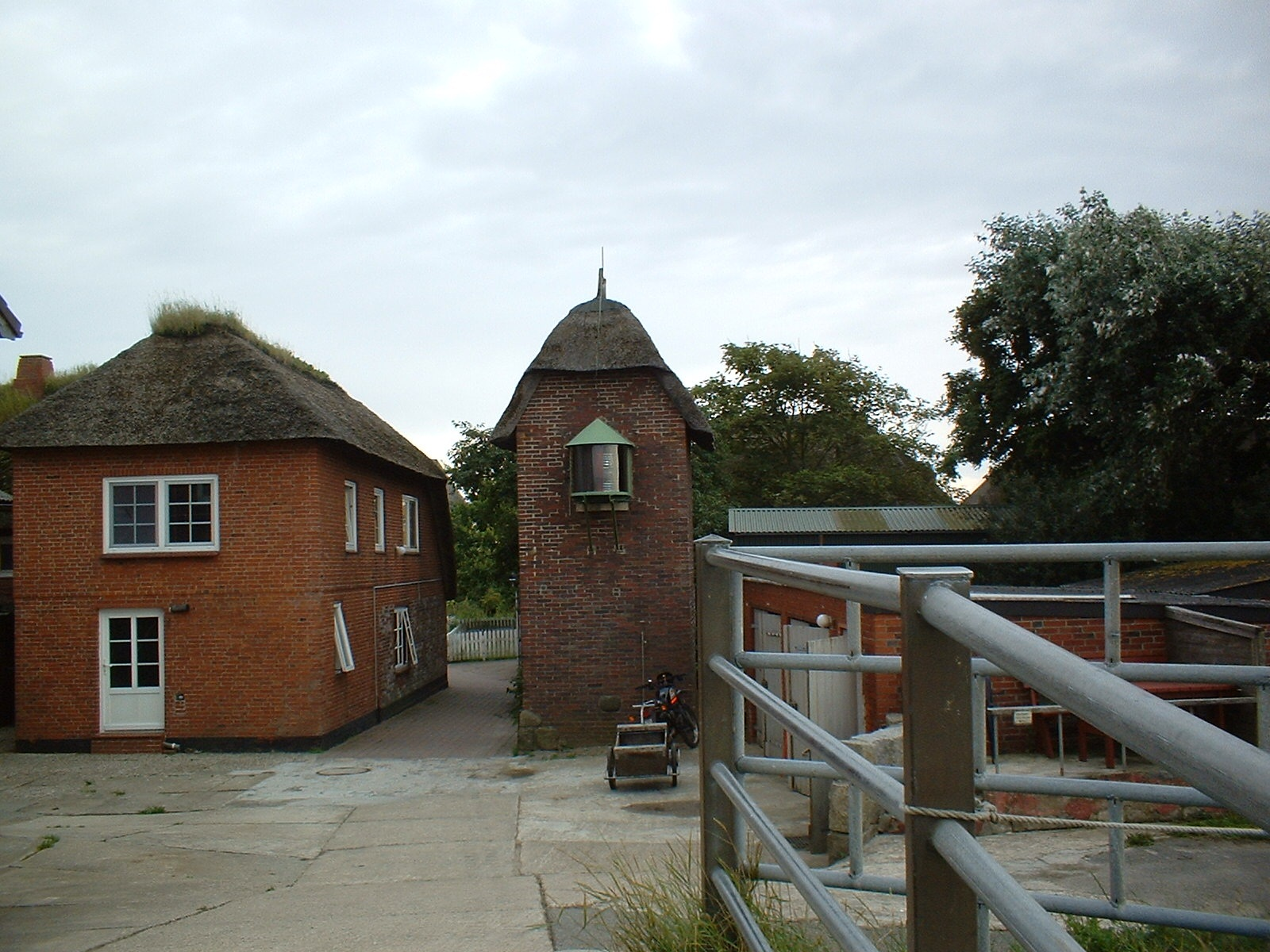
- Location: Oland, North Frisian islands
- Coordinates: 54°40′29″N 8°41′13″E

Tower
- Constructed: 1929
- Foundation: armoured concrete plate with masoned cobblestone basement
- Construction: bricks tower
- Height: 7.4 metres (24 ft)
- Shape: square tower
- Markings: unpainted red brick tower with thatched roof
- Operator: Wasserstraßen- und Schifffahrtsamt Tönning (–2021), Wasserstraßen- und Schifffahrtsamt Elbe-Nordsee (2021–)

Light
- First lit: 1929
- Focal height: 7.5 metres (25 ft)
- Lens: belt lens
- Range: 13.8 nm (white), 10.8 nm (red), 9.8 nm (green)
- Characteristic: F WRG

Oland Lighthouse (German: Leuchtturm Oland) is Germany's smallest lighthouse, being only 7.4 metres (24 ft) tall. It is located on the small Hallig of Oland. It serves as a cross light for the Föhrer Ley and Dagebüll channels. It is Germany's only lighthouse with a thatched roof. This small brick lighthouse was erected in 1929. Lit in the same year, it is still being maintained by a keeper. Until 1954 when it was electrified, the lantern was lit by liquified gas. For maintenance, the optic can be drawn out of the lantern casing on a slide. Its characteristic is "fixed", i.e. a continuous light, with white, red and green sectors. The red sector shines to the north and the green sector shines to the west. The white sector shines between the two coloured sectors or broadly towards the northwest or towards the town of Wyk on the island of Föhr from where it can be seen as a white light.

== See also ==
- List of lighthouses and lightvessels in Germany
