= Dagebüll–Oland–Langeneß island railway =

Railway line in Germany

Dagebüll–Oland–Langeneß
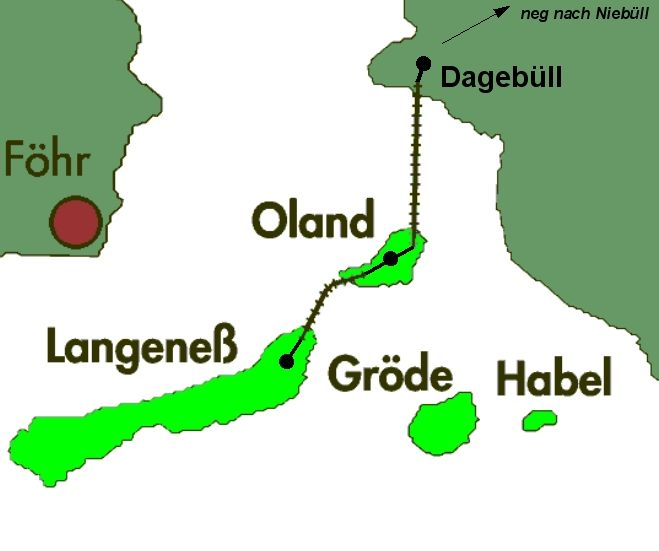
- Map of Dagebüll–Oland–Langeneß island railway

Technical
- Line length: 9 km (5.6 mi)
- Track gauge: 900 mm (2 ft 11 7/16 in)

The Dagebüll–Oland–Langeneß island railway (German: Halligbahn Dagebüll–Oland–Langeneß) is a 900 mm (2 ft 11 7/16 in) gauge Feldbahn in North Frisia that connects Dagebüll to the Halligen (low-lying islands) of Oland and Langeneß.

== Gallery ==
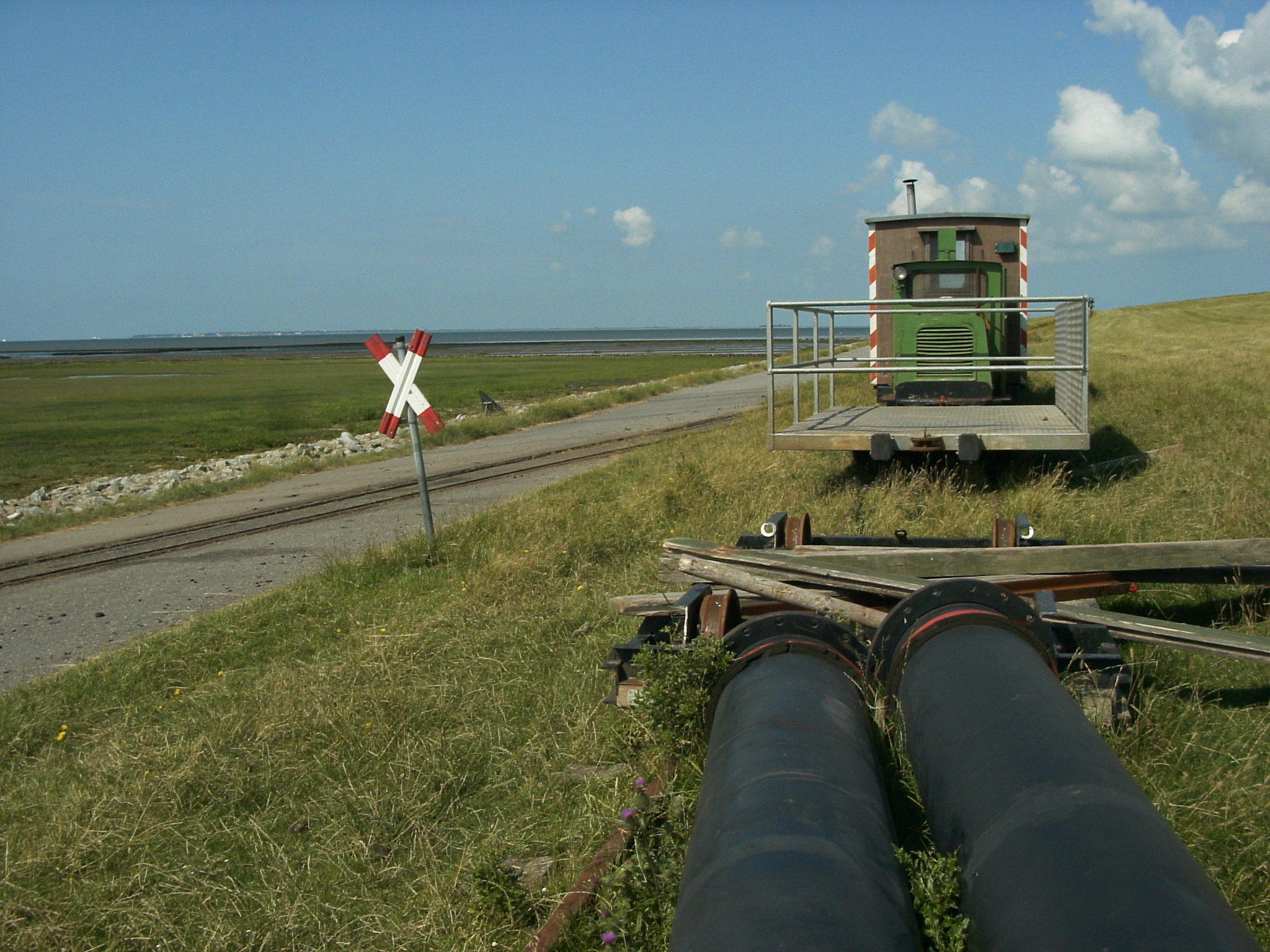
Crossing the dike at Dagebüll

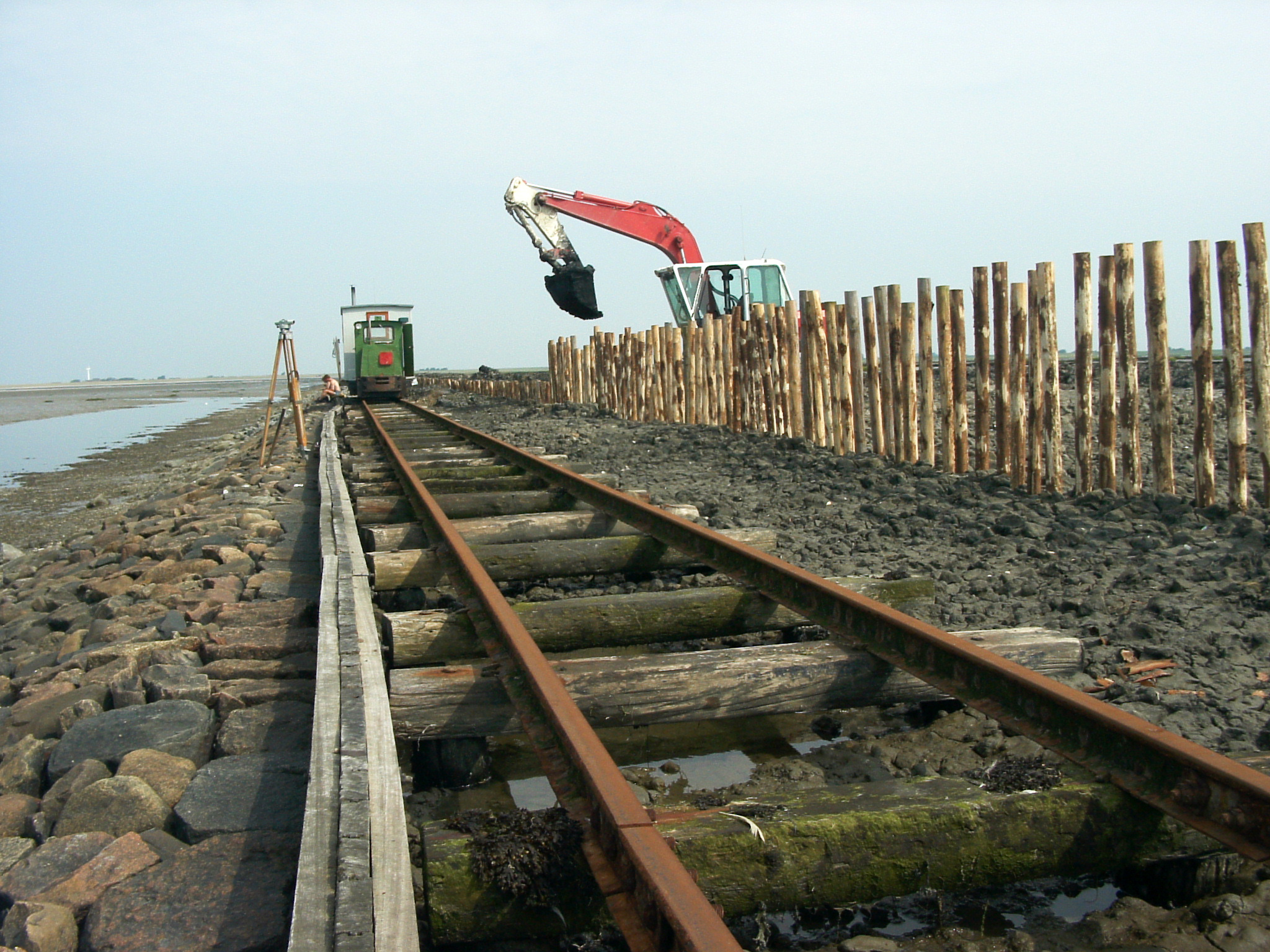
Maintenance of way (track work)

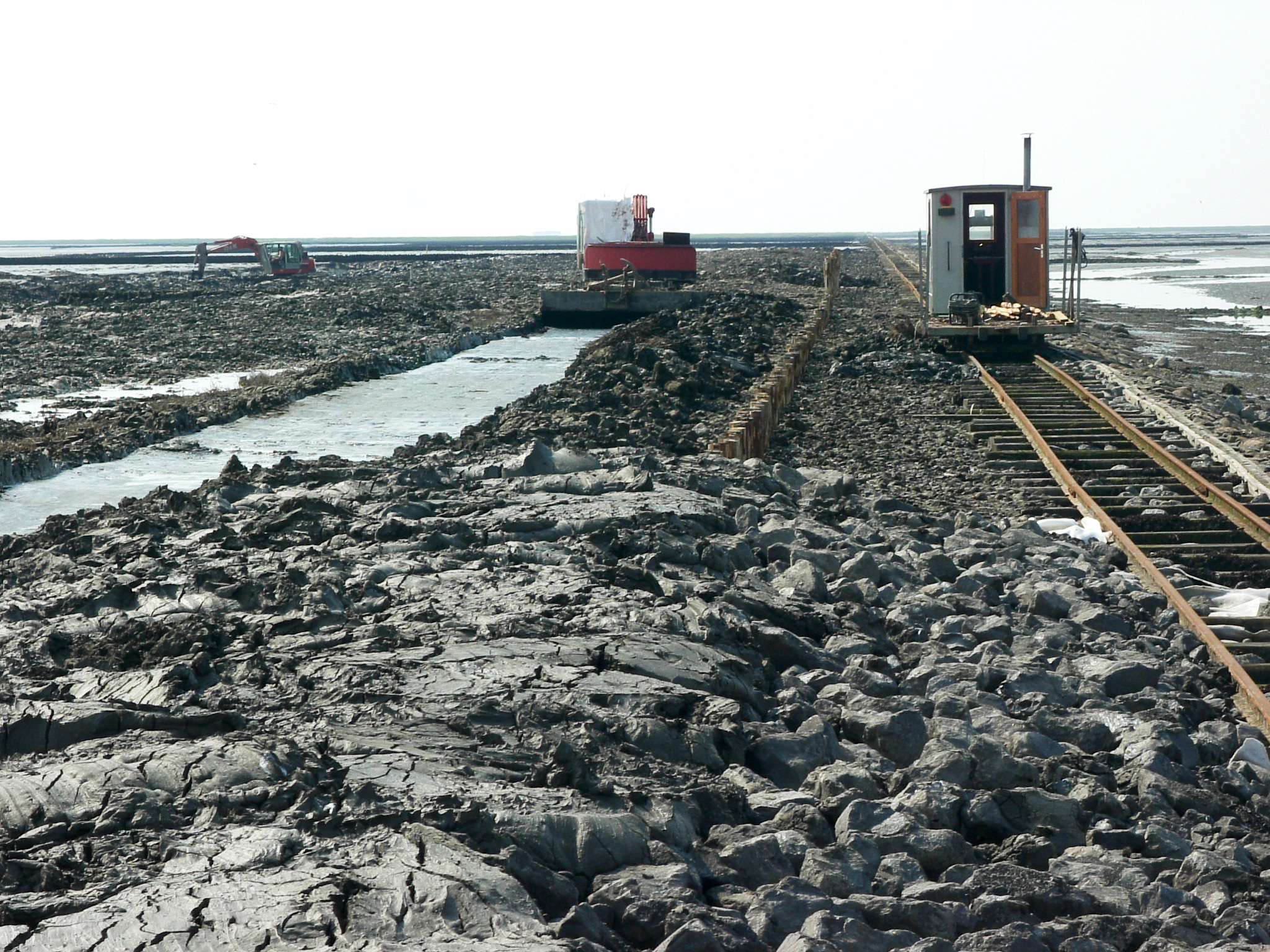
Construction work of the WSA

== Literature ==
- Rüsen, Hanne-Ruth; Petersen, Johann (2011). Halligbahn: auf schmaler Spur bei jedem Wetter zwischen Dagebüll, Oland und Langeneß [Hallig Island Railways: Narrow-gauge rail in all weather between Dagebüll, Oland und Langeneß] (in German). Quedlinburg-Gernrode: Herdam. ISBN 978-3-933178-25-1. OCLC 725063558.
- Rogl, Hans W (1996). Die Nordsee-Inselbahnen Touristik- und Güterbahnen vor der deutschen Küste [North Sea Island Railways: Tourist and Freight Railways on the German Coast] (in German) (6., überarb. Aufl ed.). Düsseldorf: Alba. ISBN 978-3-87094-230-4. OCLC 75731596.
