= Langeneß Wadden Sea Station =

Coordinates: 54°38′26″N 8°38′00″E

The Langeneß Wadden Sea Station (German: Wattenmeerhaus Langeneß) is an information centre on the island (Hallig) of Langeneß in the German Wadden Sea. It is located in the biosphere reserve of the Schleswig-Holstein Wadden Sea and Halligen. Since the station at Langeneß was founded, the house has been run by the Wadden Sea Conservation Station (Schutzstation Wattenmeer) and the World Wide Fund for Nature.
