= Hans Momsen =

North Frisian farmer, mathematician and astronomer

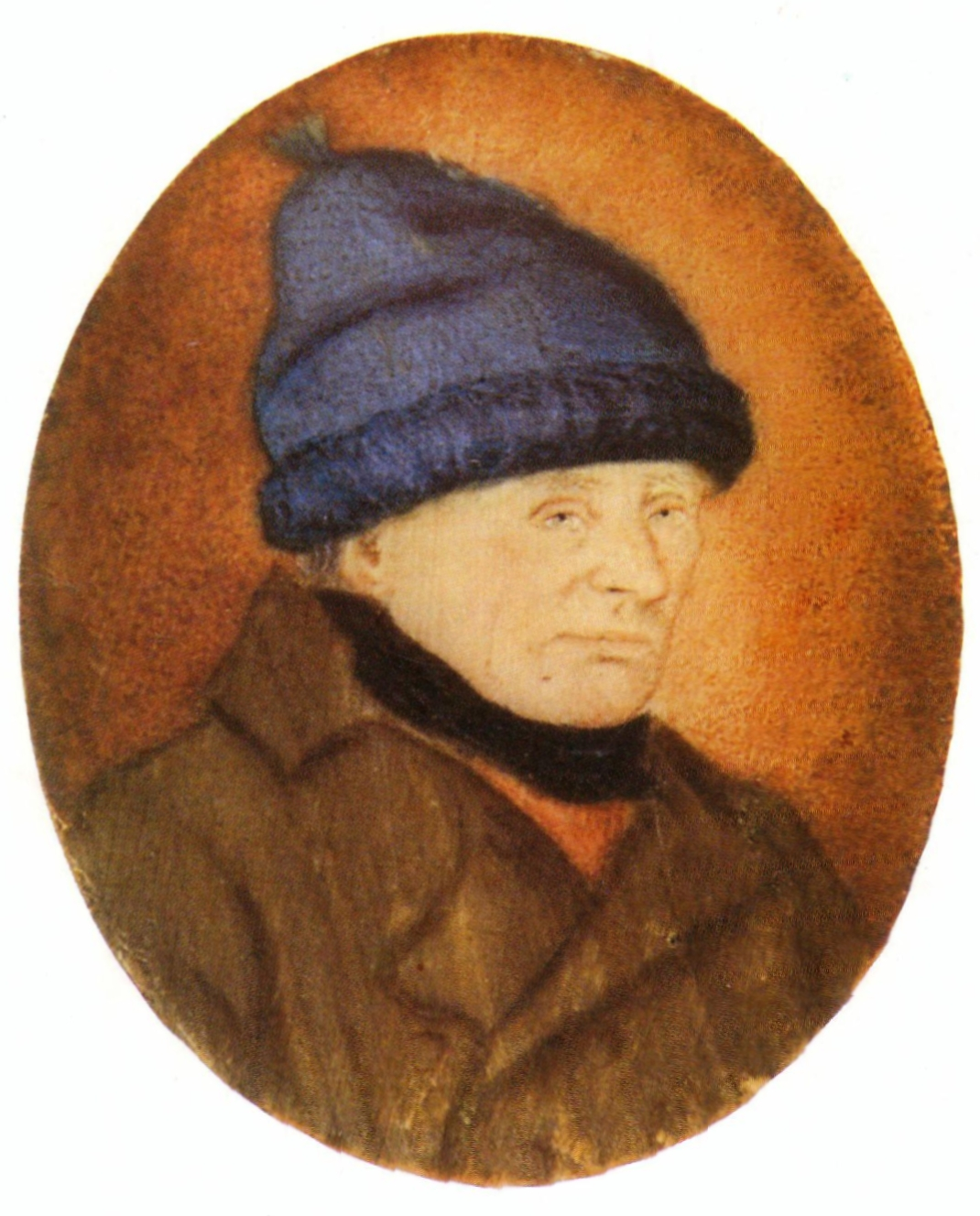
- Portrait by C. A. Jensen
- Born: 1735; Fahretoft, Duchy of Schleswig
- Died: 13 September 1811 (aged 75); Fahretoft
- Occupations: Farmer, layman mathematician, astronomer, surveyor
- Known for: Inspiring Theodor Storm

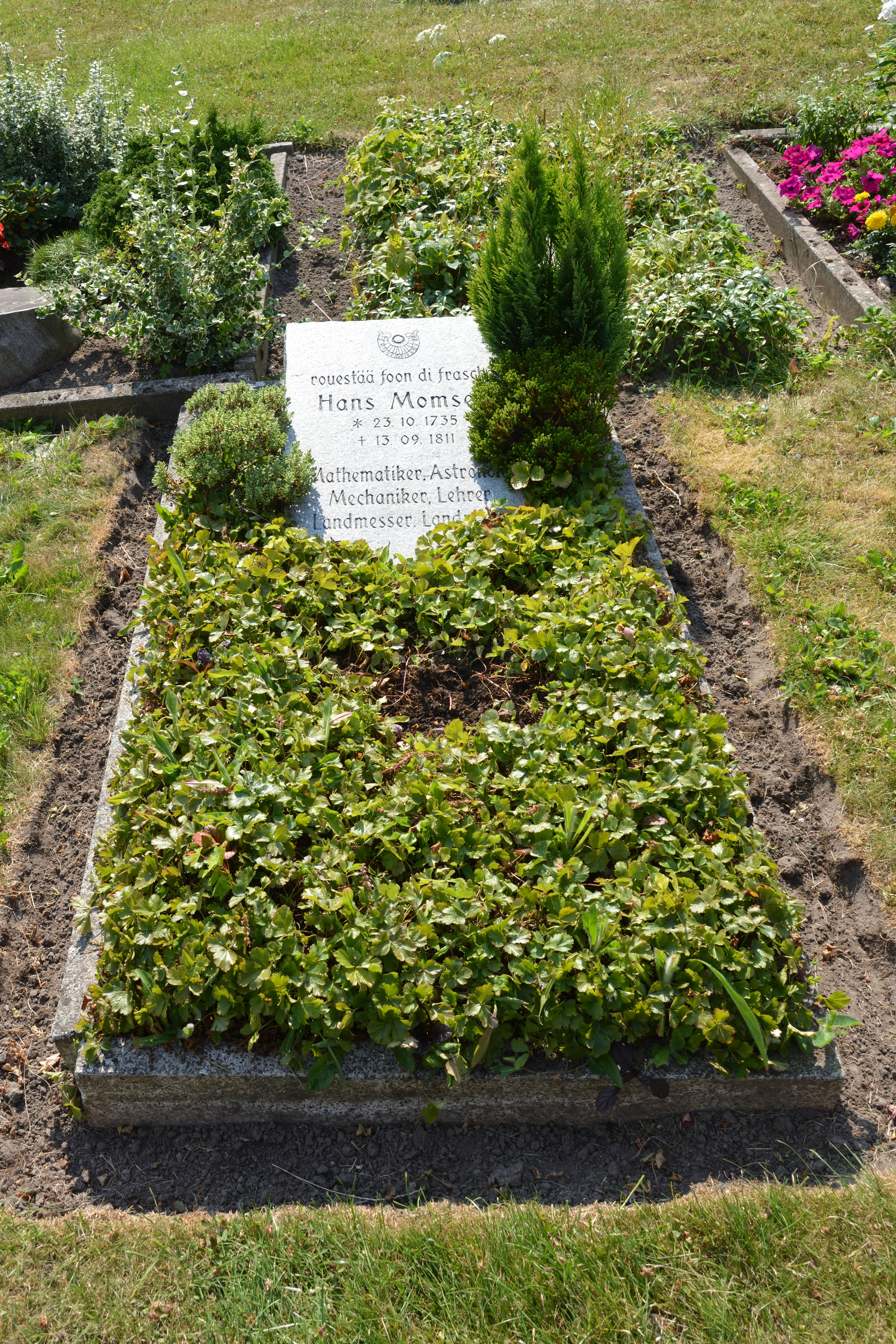
Grave in Fahretoft

Hans Momsen (born 23 October 1735, Fahretoft – 13 September 1811, ibidem) was a North Frisian farmer, mathematician and astronomer who lived in the Duchy of Schleswig in Denmark-Norway. Entirely without university studies he was able to solve complicated mathematical calculations and to construct astronomical devices, chronometers and other apparatus. He gave lessons in mathematics to gifted students. Moreover, he worked as a surveyor and built an organ for the church of Fahretoft. He is considered a polymath.

== Life ==
Hans Momsen lived on a small farmstead in Fahretoft, Duchy of Schleswig, now a part of the Dagebüll municipality in Germany. His grandfather had been a navigation teacher in the Netherlands, his father Momme Jensen was farmer and part-time surveyor who also acted as a dykemaster in the area. It has been reported that when his father Momme was not able to explain a mathematical drawing to his son and referred young Hans to his grandfather's copy of Euclid's books, Hans found the book to be written in Dutch language. Unable to read it he borrowed a Dutch textbook from a local captain and learned enough of the language to read the mathematical guide. At that time, Hans was aged 14.

Without teachers he had learned various additional languages such as Latin, French and English to an extent that he was able to study treatments on mathematics, astronomy and other natural sciences at home. But he also learned about philosophy, geography and the trade of making clocks. At the same time he began to construct small mechanical devices, scaled models and instruments. In 1753 he took up work as a surveyor in Ditmarsh where he was also able to sell some of his self-made instruments. When his father Momme died, Hans Momsen inherited the farm and took up his father's post as dykemaster. He married a local farmer's daughter with whom he had nine children.

Momsen used to bind books, made woodcuts, copper etchings, and drew landscape portraits as well as blueprints for buildings. One of his local students became a professor of mathematics at University of Copenhagen, he used to send his manuscripts to Momsen for peer review before publishing them. During a visit in Copenhagen, Momsen met a number of scientists and philosophers including Johannes Nikolaus Tetens.

Hans Momsen died in 1811 in his native village Fahretoft.

== Aftermath ==
Hans Momsen's organ was only played during a single year in the Fahretoft church but a sundial made by him can still be seen today at the entrance to the church house. Numerous of his astronomical tools are preserved and are on display in museums in the area.

His skills are cited in Theodor Storm's novella Der Schimmelreiter where Hans Mommsen, a builder of "chronometers, telescopes and organs" is cited. While Hans Mommsen is only a supporting character in the novella, the real Momsen is said to have been Storm's inspiration for the protagonist Hauke Haien.

Each year since 1986 the Nordfriesland district awards the Hans-Momsen-Preis for outstanding cultural merits in North Frisia.
