= Herne Bay Pier =

Former pier in Herne Bay, Kent, England

Herne Bay's 3rd Pier
- Herne Bay Pier in October 2026
- Type: Passenger steamer landing stage; tourist attraction
- Carries: Steamer passengers; tram; pedestrians
- Location: East Kent
- Coordinates: 51°22′20″N 1°07′14″E
- Official name: Herne Bay Pier
- Owner: 1899−1909 Herne Bay Pavilion Pier and Promenade Co; 1909−1974 Herne Bay UDC; 1974− Canterbury City Council
- Toll: 2d (1899) → 1s 6d (1968)

Characteristics
- Total length: 3,787 feet (1,154 m)

History
- Constructor: Head Wrightson & Co of Thornaby-on-Tees
- Opening date: Easter 1899
- Closure date: 11 January 1978

Herne Bay Pier was the third pier to be built at Herne Bay, Kent for passenger steamers. It was notable for its exceptional length of 3,787 feet (1,154 m) and made famous after appearing in the opening sequence of Ken Russell's first feature film French Dressing. Herne Bay Pier suffered extensive damage in a 1978 storm, leading to much of it being dismantled in 1980, leaving only a pier-stub at the landward end, and part of the landing stage isolated at sea. The two previous piers built on the same location included a wooden deep-sea pier designed by Thomas Rhodes, assistant of Thomas Telford, and a second shorter iron version by Wilkinson & Smith.

== Structural history ==
=== First pier ===
Herne Bay Pier Act 1831
- Act of Parliament
- Parliament of the United Kingdom
- Long title: An Act for making and maintaining a Pier or Jetty, and other Works, at Herne Bay in the Parish of Herne in the County of Kent.
- Citation: 1 Will. 4. c. xxv

Dates
- Royal assent: 30 March 1831

Text of statute as originally enacted

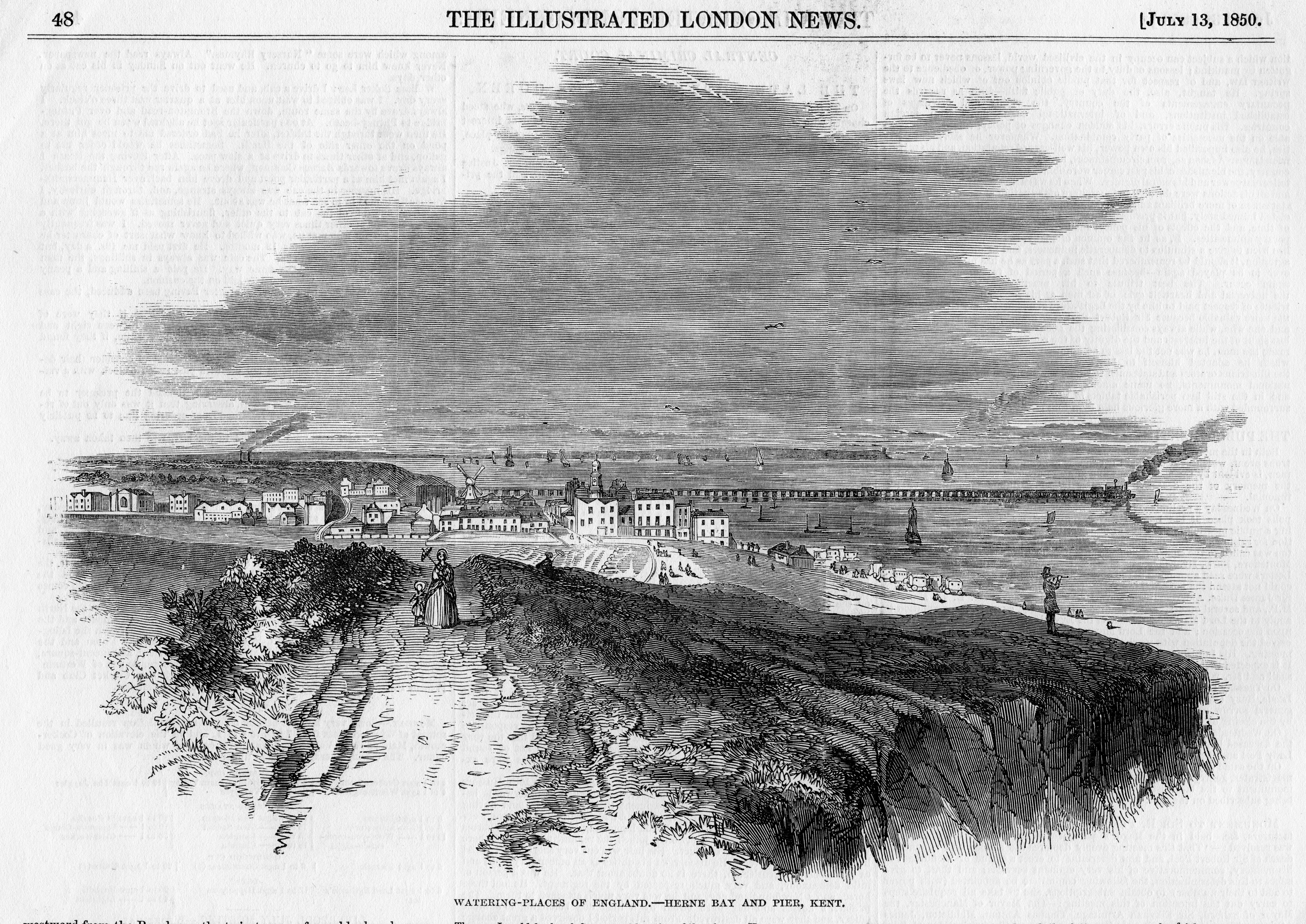
First pier, by Edmund Evans, 1850

According to The Illustrated London News of 1850, Herne Bay had fewer than a dozen inhabitants at the beginning of the 19th century. With the arrival of a military encampment the population of the area quickly grew into a small, developed community. This small development in turn attracted visitors from passing London-Margate steamers, who made shore excursions into the bay area aboard small ships known as hoys. Enjoying the small village as a relaxing get away, but not enjoying the bumpy rides in hoys, visitors decided they needed a pier upon which their steamers could moor and accommodation to make the trip to Herne Bay an extended stay, and so the first Herne Bay Pier was built. A group of investors led by Surrey building contractor George Burge who had worked for Thomas Telford at St Katharine Docks, a 3,613 feet (1,101 m) long and 24 feet (7.3 m) wide pier was designed and built by Telford's assistant Thomas Rhodes. Telford was building Whitstable harbour at the time. The pier was authorised by the Herne Bay Pier Act 1831 (1 Will. 4. c. xxv), and the first wooden pile was driven on 4 July 1831, and the structure was completed on 12 May 1832 at a cost of £50,000 (equivalent to £4.6 million in 2023). The steamer Venus was the first to bring passengers to Herne Bay using the newly built pier. That same decade the Telford Terrace, the Pier Hotel and the promenade were also opened as the bustling vacation town continued to attract vacationers.

Herne Bay Pier Act 1836
- Act of Parliament
- Parliament of the United Kingdom
- Long title: An Act for altering, amending, and enlarging the Powers and Provisions of an Act for making and maintaining a Pier or Jetty and other Works at Heme Bay in the Parish of Hems in the County of Kent; and for giving additional Powers to the Heme Bay Pier Company.
- Citation: 6 & 7 Will. 4. c. cxii

Dates
- Royal assent: 4 July 1836
Other legislation
Amends	Herne Bay Pier Act 1831

Text of statute as originally enacted

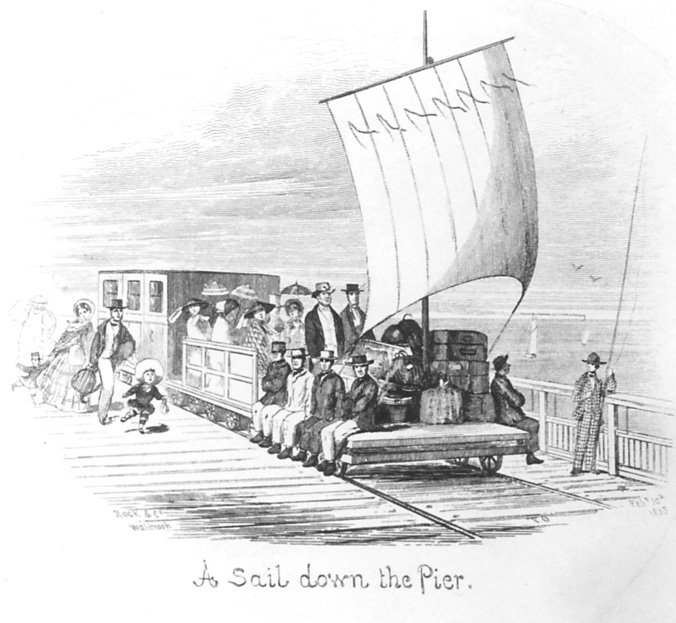
Neptune's Car on first pier, picture 1855

The original pier was built all of timber, with the piles being driven straight into the sea bed; it was "considered at the time the best specimen of pile-driving", and described as a "pier and breakwater". There was curved stone balustrading at the entrance, taken from old London Bridge which was demolished in 1831. A sail trolley vehicle running on tracks, powered by sail and foot and nicknamed Neptune's Car, ran the length of the pier from 13 June 1833, carrying passengers and baggage. When wind was inadequate as commonly happened, pier employees physically pushed the trolley. The pier's length was defined by the one-fathom draught of the paddle steamers and the shallow two-fathom depth of the sea even three quarters of a mile offshore at high tide. It was followed in 1861 by the railway station, and thus began the town's growth into a holiday resort. However, because the wooden piles were never protected by copper sheathing they suffered from shipworm. By 1850, many piles had been replaced with iron ones, or with wooden ones "prepared by Mr Payne's process" against shipworm, but as a whole they showed irreversible deterioration from 1860 onwards. Pier dues were considered expensive at 1s 6d. Subsequently, the first Herne Bay Pier Company failed due to competition between paddle steamers and the new railway which was opened on 13 July 1861, because previously most visitors arrived by steamer, then they all arrived by rail. The first pier was taken down in 1870 to 1871, long after the paddle steamers stopped coming in 1862.

=== Second pier ===
In February 1871 the Herne Bay Improvement Commissioners bought the Pier Approach for £100. In the same year they bought the first pier for £475, completed its demolition and gave a 99-year lease for the Pier Approach to the second Herne Bay Pier Company. The second pier was built in less than four months for £2,000 and opened on 27 August 1873 by the Lord Mayor of London, Sir Sydney Waterlow. Waterlow made an entrance, arriving by train with uniformed sheriffs and a retinue of "gorgeously clad" minions in purple, chocolate and green livery. His procession was led by the East Kent Militia to a town hall lunch, regatta, fireworks and dances with ten thousand celebrating locals. The pier was engineered by Wilkinson & Smith, built with cast iron piles filled with concrete, had a bandstand at the end and was only 328 feet (100 m) long: too short to land paddle steamers in spite of their shallow draught, but long enough for promenading and entertainment. It retained the London Bridge balustrade. Although the new pier authority, Herne Bay Pavilion Pier and Promenade Company, built a wooden theatre, shops, lavatories and ticket office across its entrance in June 1884 it made no money. The theatre was known as the Pavilion; it was designed by McInyre North and opened by Mrs C. Prescott-Westcar on 24 July 1884.

=== Third pier ===
==== Heyday ====
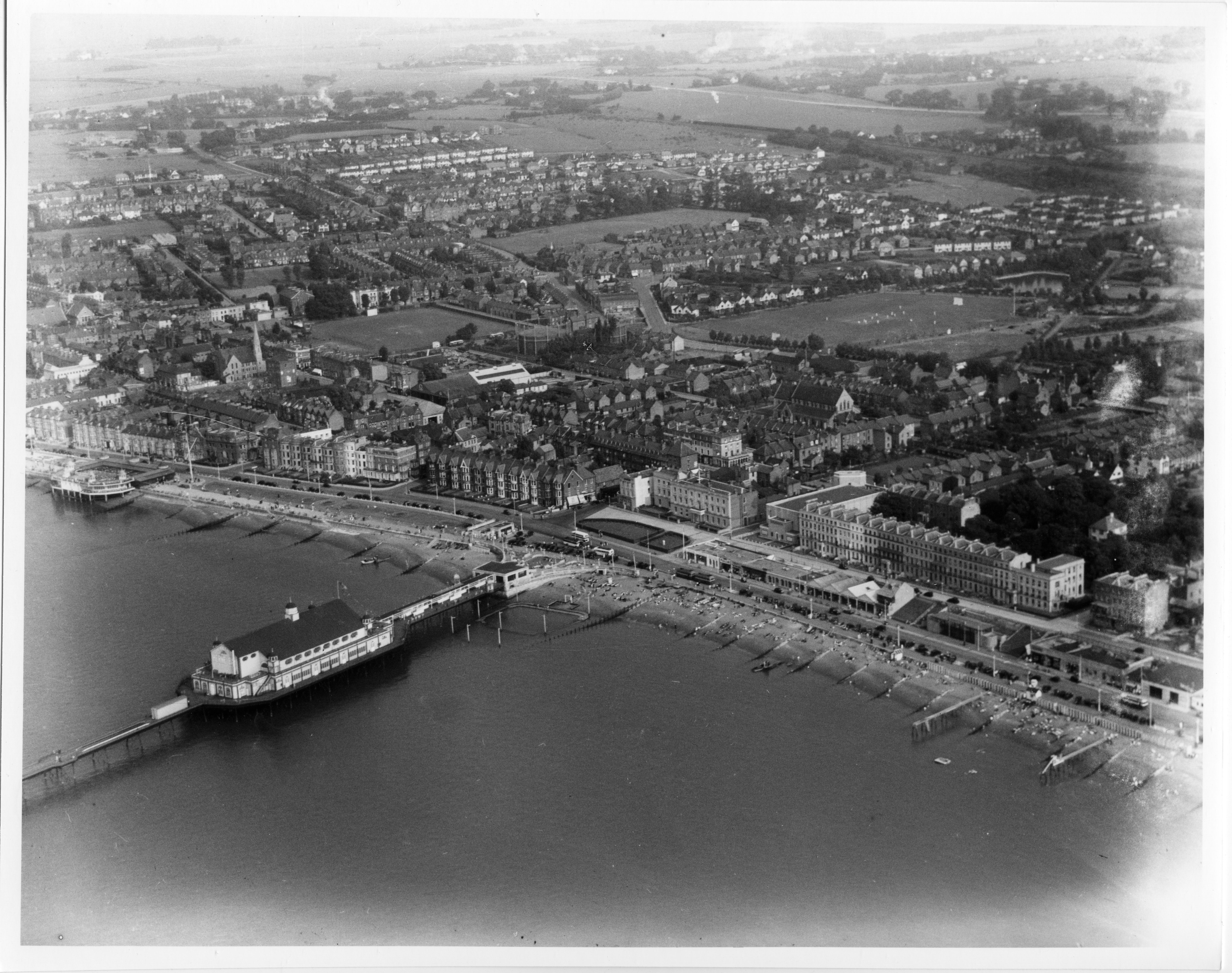
1937 aerial view of pier showing 1910 Grand Pier Pavilion

In response to popular demand, the pier company applied to Parliament in 1890 for powers to construct a deep-sea pier, and this was granted in the Herne Bay Pier Order 1891. In the August of that year, a temporary pier head was constructed, and in 1892 experimental visits were made by steamer Glen Rosa, but no further construction work took place, and the legal powers granted by the order lapsed. In 1895 the pier company re-applied and was granted powers again, so by July 1896 the short pier was rebuilt to the design of Ewen Matheson of Walbrook in London. On 26 August of that year the first pile of the deep-sea extension was screwed. The third pier was built of iron and designed by Head, Wrighton & Company of Thornaby-on-Tees at a cost of £60,000 including fittings (equivalent to £6.3 million in 2023). During construction it survived the great storm of 28−29 November 1897 which destroyed the promenade and damaged houses. It was completed in 1899, and at 3,787 feet (1,154 m) was the second longest in England. In the first year the tram fares made £488. The pier was used by paddle steamers until the last visit by PS Medway Queen in 1963. The new 1899 restaurant at the pierhead later became a ticket office and cafe, and still stands today: wooden, octagonal and domed. It had a promenade deck on the roof, but this may now be gone, as it is not visible in photographs. The theatre was retained, and the public was first admitted to the landing stage and Pier Head Restaurant at Easter 1899. On 14 September it was formally opened by Mrs C. Prescott-Westcar of Strode Park House in Herne Bay. At a short distance from the entrance was a large concert marquee for the local Cremona orchestra, and an electric tram provided transport from one end to the other for a penny.

Herne Bay Pier Act 1908
- Act of Parliament
- Parliament of the United Kingdom
- Long title: An Act to authorise the sale of Herne Bay Pier and for other purposes.
- Citation: 8 Edw. 7. c. iv

Dates
- Royal assent: 14 April 1908

Text of statute as originally enacted

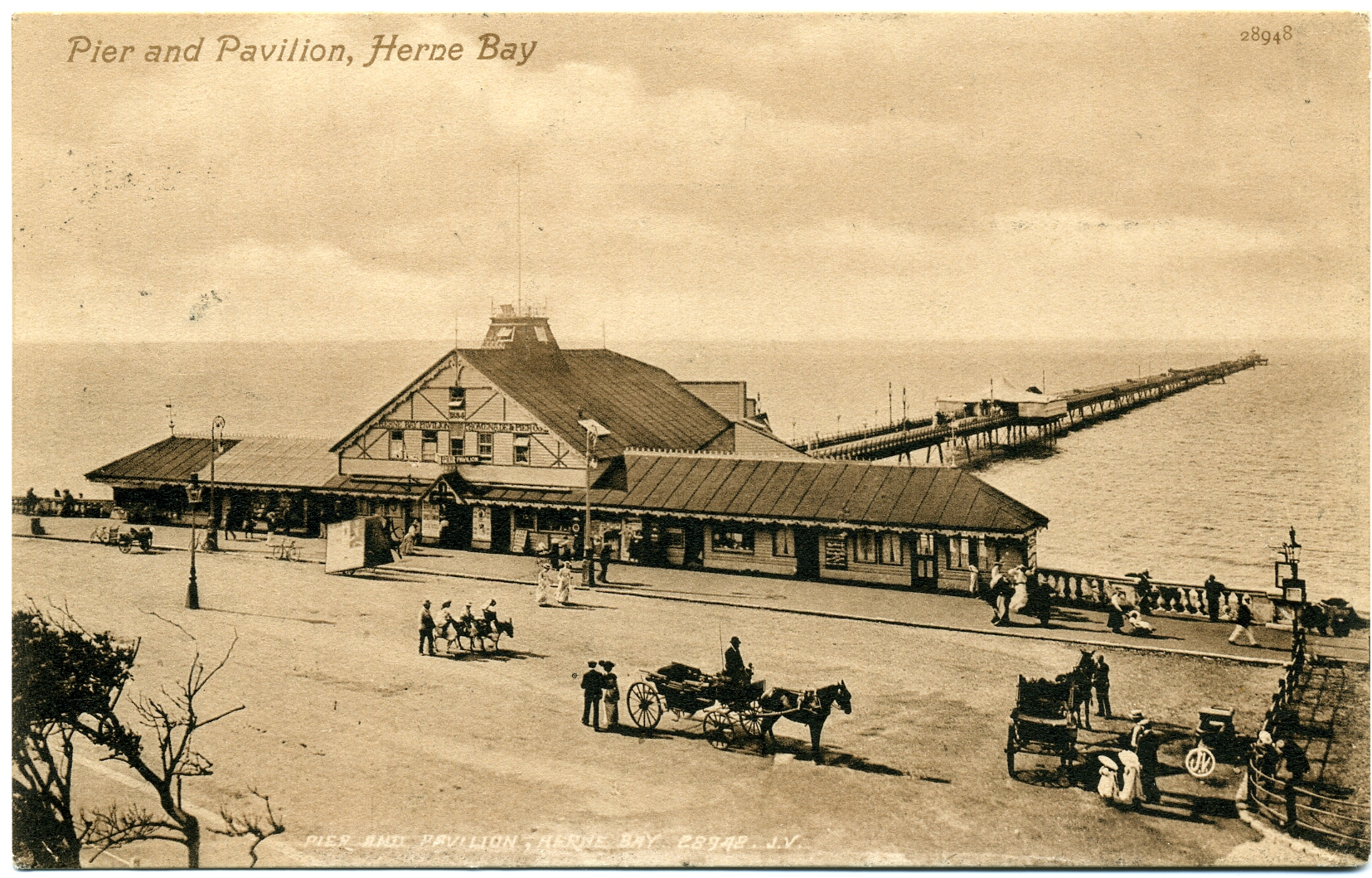
3rd pier, 1899-1908

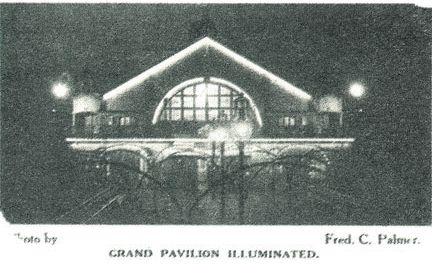
Grand Pier Pavilion illuminated on opening night (Palmer 1910)

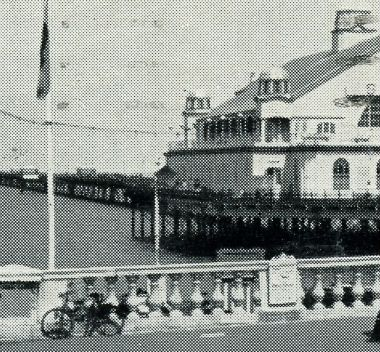
The London Bridge balustrade, removed 1953 after storm

In February 1904 the managing director of the pier company and treasurer of Holborn Borough Council, Henry C. Jones, was arrested for embezzling funds from the council to use for the pier. He was sentenced to five years and the pier company went into receivership. Powers to sell the pier were given in the Herne Bay Pier Act 1908 (8 Edw. 7. c. iv). On 21 October 1908 the receiver offered the pier to Herne Bay Urban District Council for £6,000, and the council completed purchase on 29 September 1909, with authority given by the Herne Bay Pier Order 1909. The council considered the old Pavilion Theatre at the pier entrance too small so in 1910 organised a competition to design a new Grand Pier Pavilion. Percy Waldram, Mr Moscrop-Young and Mr Glanfield of London won it, and in May to June of that year the marquee section was widened and the pavilion was built for £2,000. It seated a thousand and its auditorium was 130 by 95 by 35 feet high, with stage and dressing rooms. It had a rock maple, multi-purpose floor for roller skating, dancing, public events and community activities. Sir John Knill, Lord Mayor of London, arrived on 3 August 1910 through the decorated streets of Herne Bay with a coach parade of mayors and sheriffs to lunch on the pier, and opened it with a trumpet fanfare from the 2nd Northumberland Fusiliers. The Grand Pavilion survived on 9 September 1928 when the theatre, shops and Mazzoleni's cafe at the entrance were destroyed by fire. In 1924 the pier received a new electric tramcar built by Strode Engineering Works at Herne, and in 1932 the Pier Approach was redeveloped to replace the fire-damaged site.

==== World War II ====
During World War II, the pier was encased in barbed wire and the army took it over, camouflage netting was manufactured in the pavilion by local women and the tram was last used in June 1939 to carry army stores. Steamers were requisitioned for war work, including the PS Medway Queen which became a minesweeper and Little Ship. In June 1940 the army blew up two sections of the pier between the pavilion and pier head to prevent enemy landing, then crossed the gaps with Bailey bridges in the 1940s. It has been suggested that the gaps and Bailey bridges weakened the pier structure and permitted the storm damage of 11 January 1978. In 1947, war-damage compensation of £21,924.15s.1d was received by the council, but this was not enough for full repair, and priority was given to the Grand Pavilion, substructure and decking. Bailey bridges had to be used to span the gaps so that by 1947 the pleasure steamers were calling at the pier again.

==== Post-war ====
Pier and Harbour Order (Herne Bay) Confirmation Act 1952
- Act of Parliament
- Parliament of the United Kingdom
- Long title: An Act to confirm a Provisional Order made by the Minister of Transport under the General Pier and Harbour Act 1861 relating to Herne Bay.
- Citation: 15 & 16 Geo. 6 & 1 Eliz. 2. c. xxvii

Dates
- Royal assent: 1 August 1952
Other legislation
Relates to	General Pier and Harbour Act 1861

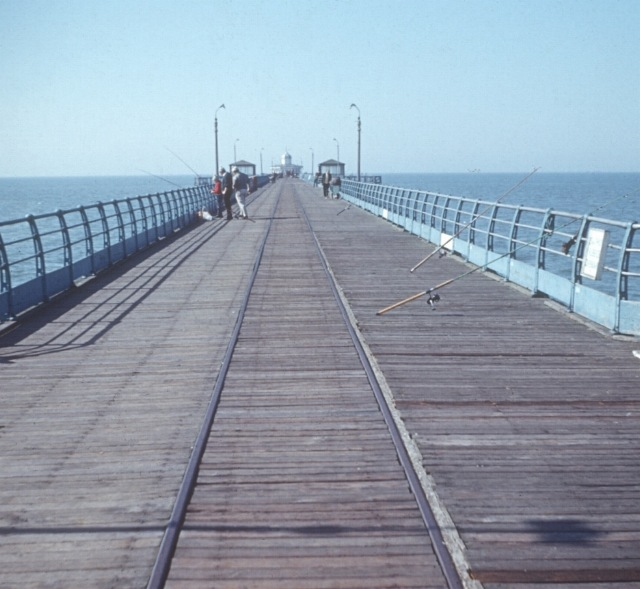
View along pier, 1966

In 1950 the pier tram was sold for £12 10s because it could not pass the Bailey bridges, and replaced by a narrow-gauge steam railway which was gone by 1959. On 1 March 1949 the pier entrance suffered sea-storm damage, and again between 31 January and 1 February in the North Sea flood of 1953, when a twenty-foot storm surge swept past the old pier-master's house, Richmond Villa, and as far as the High Street. As a result, in 1953 the stone balustrade from London Bridge, set at the entrance in 1833, was taken down and replaced with railings. The present whereabouts of the balustrade is unknown. In January 1963 the surface of the sea froze for weeks in the curved shapes of sea spray as far as a mile offshore. The tide continued to go in and out under its white crust, leaving the pier surrounded by ice. Rapid thaw then caused stress to the piles, exacerbated by previous storm damage and neglect. The summer of that year saw the last visit by PS Medway Queen. By 1968 the seaward end of the pier had been closed and abandoned. In September the same year insurance was withdrawn for the deep sea part of the pier beyond the pavilion, and the public excluded. The Grand Pier Pavilion was refurbished at a cost of £158,000 but was destroyed by fire possibly caused by a spark from a welding torch during pier entrance reconstruction in June 1970. The building burned down within hours, to the distress of Herne Bay. As replacement, the Pier Pavilion was designed in 1971 by John C. Clague, opened by Edward Heath on 5 September 1976, and called The Cowshed by the public. Meanwhile, ownership of the pier was transferred to Canterbury City Council on 1 April 1974 merger.

==== Destruction and aftermath ====
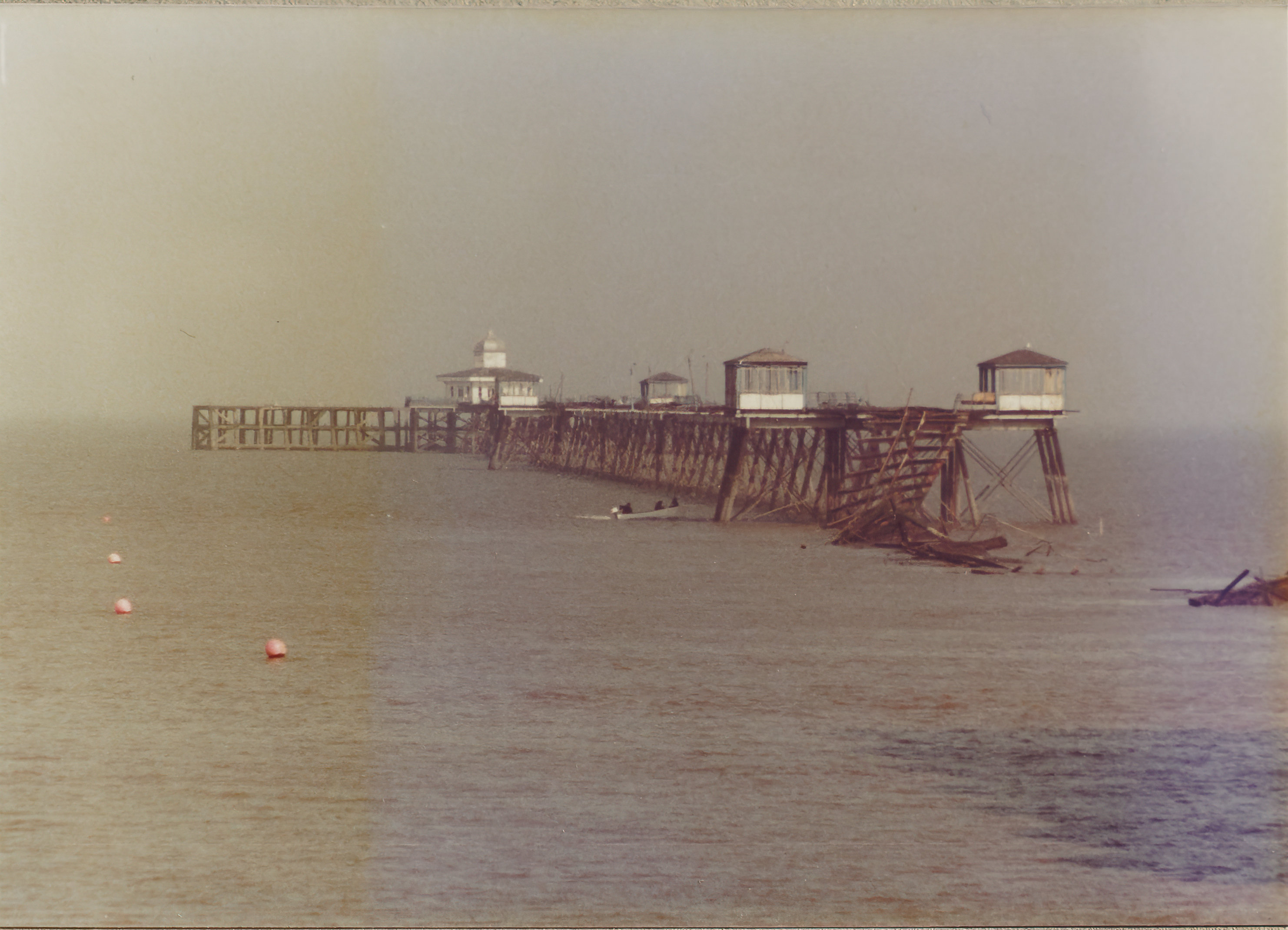
After the 1978 storm damage showing end pavilion and small pavilions on walkway

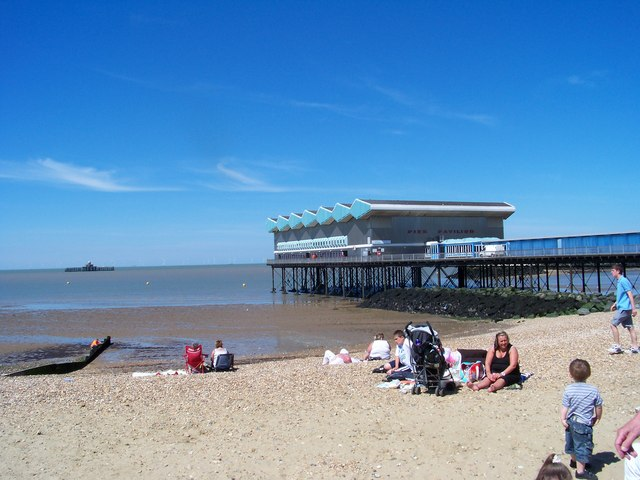
Stub of pier with detached pierhead, 2009

Sea-anglers and others petitioned for the pier to be repaired, but storms on 11 January 1978 and in February 1979 caused progressive collapse of the central portion of the pier between the two Bailey bridges, and its remains were dismantled in 1980. The pier head was too solid for demolition, so it remains isolated at sea with its solar-powered navigation light on a pole. From 1989 the Waverley Preservation Society and Medway Queen Preservation Society have shown interest in a future rebuilding of the deep sea pier. The Association of Hotels, Business and Leisure (HBL) has been promoting the rebuilding of a deep-sea pier, and has created and costed its own design. A redevelopment plan for the pier was suggested by Cooperman Vision in 2004 and a feasibility study was carried out by the Council, but it came to nothing. In 2008 MP Roger Gale suggested that if Canterbury City Council had not refused permission for a casino in Herne Bay, that casino may have helped fund reconstruction of the pier. At the same time, Canterbury City Council was setting up the Herne Bay Pier Trust as a charitable trust to raise £12.5 million to rebuild the pier. As of February 2010, the sports centre was due to be closed in 2011, and on 22 February 2010 the £10,000 Herne Bay Pier Report was published by Canterbury City Council in association with Humberts Leisure, with the suggestion that the Herne Bay Museum and King's Hall sites be sold for redevelopment, to pay for a new build on top of the remaining pier stub. The time limit for public objections was 19 April 2010. The National Piers Society suggested in 2009 that the remaining stub of the pier was at serious risk of demolition or collapse. The sports pavilion was demolished in 2012. In 2015 drone footage revealed the crumbling condition of the isolated pier head. In September 2019 there were fears that the pier head is precariously propped up by a piece of plywood and is at risk of collapse.

== Social history ==
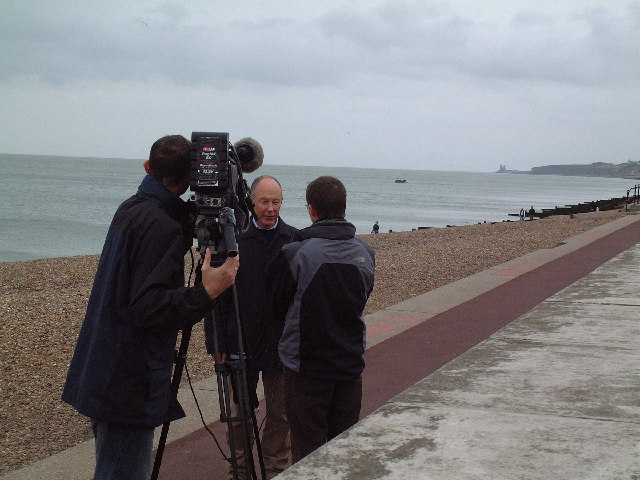
Son of HJ Wilson at 60th anniversary of 1945 jet speed record between pier and Reculver

In January and April 1899, two old pier signal cannon, used to identify the pier to shipping in fog, were recovered from near the end of the pier by divers. These were eventually installed on the steps of Herne Bay Clock Tower sometime after 1900. The Duke of Cambridge arrived at the pier in Herne Bay Steam Boat Company's PS City of Canterbury under the Royal Standard in 1837. There were two serious accidents on the first pier: in 1840 a woman with a wooden leg was knocked down and killed by the trolley which again in 1844 hit a porter who lost his arm. In that year, possibly in response to the second accident, Captain Charles Cornelius Gardiner was appointed pier master. On 16 July 1901 the electric tram went through the railings of the third pier, dragging a tram car with it and killing a woman.

The pier stayed open during World War I, but steamers were requisitioned for war service, entertainers were away fighting and tramcars became shelters. Lydia Cecilia Hill appeared as a dancer in the old Pier Theatre up to the age of 15 years, until it burned down in 1928. On 27 Nov 1941 a Wellington bomber crashed into the sea to the east of the pier. The first jet airspeed record and the first airspeed record over 600 mph was made between Herne Bay Pier and Reculver by H. J. Wilson who broke the World Air Speed Record at 606 mph in a standard Gloster Meteor Mark IV in November 1945. Cricketer Godfrey Evans used to box on the pier: "he would take on all comers at £2 a bout until his county Kent, fearing for his eyesight, told him to stop". From 1910 to the end of the 1960s the Grand Pavilion housed summer shows, winter pantomimes, exhibitions and the Remembrance Day and Commonwealth Day services. The Pier Pavilion, known as the Cowshed, had public roller skating sessions, and until 2010 was home to two roller hockey clubs which won championships. There was a gym, and other sports hosted here were badminton, judo, squash and five-a-side football. Since the pier was built, youths have worried local people by tombstoning off the pier. There is an annual crab-catching competition on the pier stub. The pier tends to be used as a marker for races.

== Future redevelopments ==
Regeneration of the pier began in 2008, when Canterbury City Council set up a registered charity, Herne Bay Pier Trust, responsible for the task of bringing the pier to life for the benefit of the community; the trust has been described by the Piers Society as one of the most active pier trusts in the country. A Herne Bay projects exhibition was arranged on 24 March 2010, at the Kings Hall, Herne Bay. This was organised by Canterbury City Council and Humberts Leisure, who wrote the Herne Bay Pier report.

With a loan of £25,000 in 2012, the trust prepared for the construction of 12 retail kiosks along the promenade, opened by the celebrity, Sandi Toksvig and rented out at £60 per week to local start-up businesses. After initial success in the first year, the trust has used the £50,000 Peoples Millions Lottery win to commission a canopy, glass windbreaks and a stage on the large platform which it is leasing for 20 years at £20,000 annually. During future summer months, the trust plans to make the pier available for entertainers, musicians and dance troupes.

A long-term ambition of local people is for the long pier to be rebuilt, estimated as a £12.5 million project in March 2008. Considering funding requirements, the trust is investigating the possibility an energy company might create a lagoon in the bay, with turbines under a newly built pier walkway to generate energy from the tides; an EU directive exists stating a third of electrical power must come from renewable sources by 2020. It is a priority for local people of Herne Bay to reinstate their pier to its former status as a seafront focal point.

== Cultural references ==
Punch and Judy shows have always taken place during summer right next to the pier on the beach to the west of it, and this tradition is continued in the annual Herne Bay Festival. Pierrots used to perform in the open air at the end of the pier until 1914, and in 2009 a recreation of such a show at the Herne Bay Bandstand was specially commissioned by the Council for Herne Bay Festival. Ken Russell chose Herne Bay Pier as the backdrop to the opening sequence of his first feature film, French Dressing (1963), and returned to Herne Bay in 2008 to bemoan the missing pier. It also featured in Hugues Burin des Roziers' film Blue jeans - Du beurre aux Allemands, filmed in 1976. In 2008 Canterbury art students designed a virtual pier as part of the Cultural Trail.

== Gallery ==
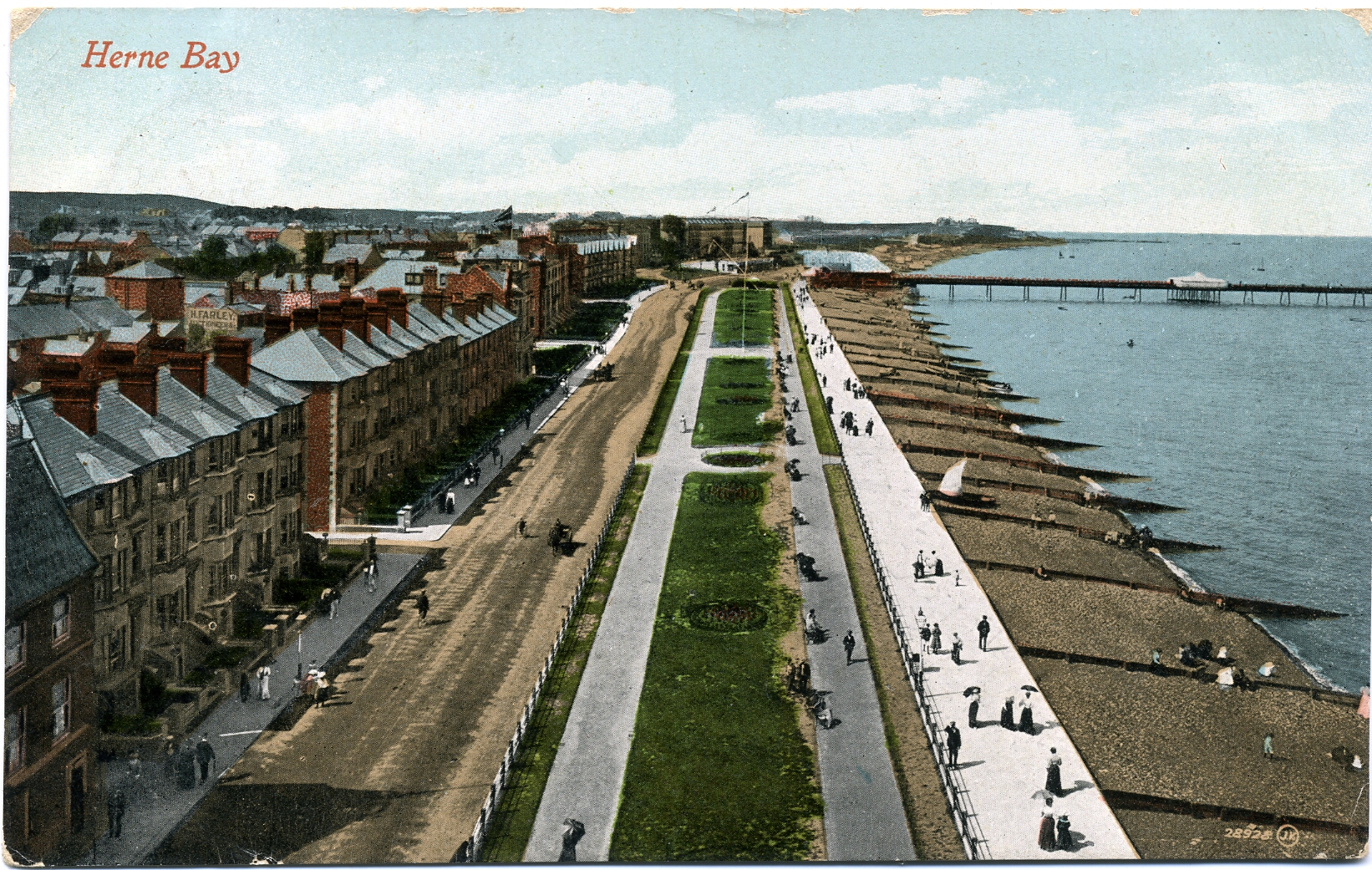
Tinted photograph of Herne Bay Pier, taken from the top of the clock tower, 1909

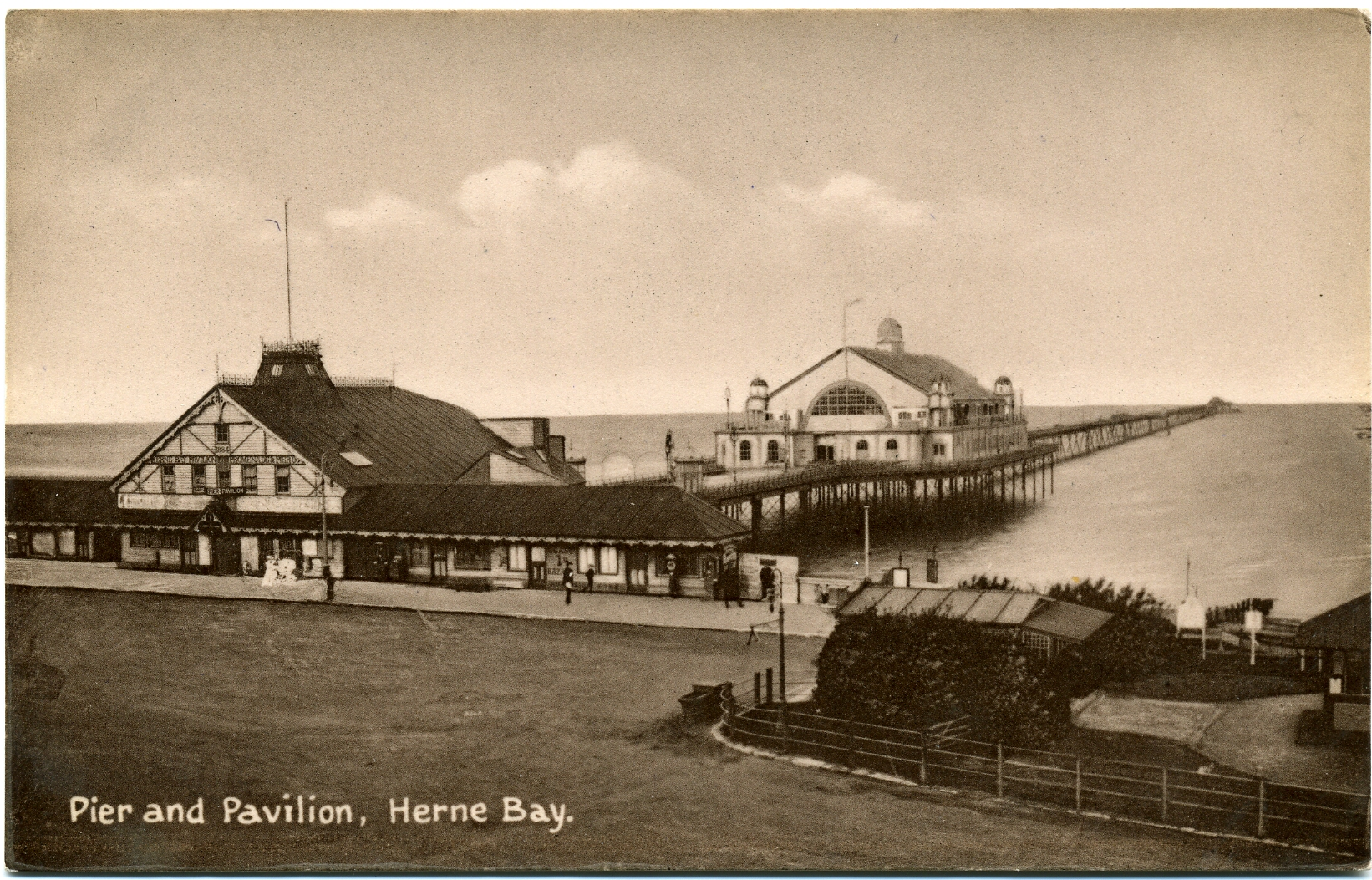
3rd pier 1910-1914

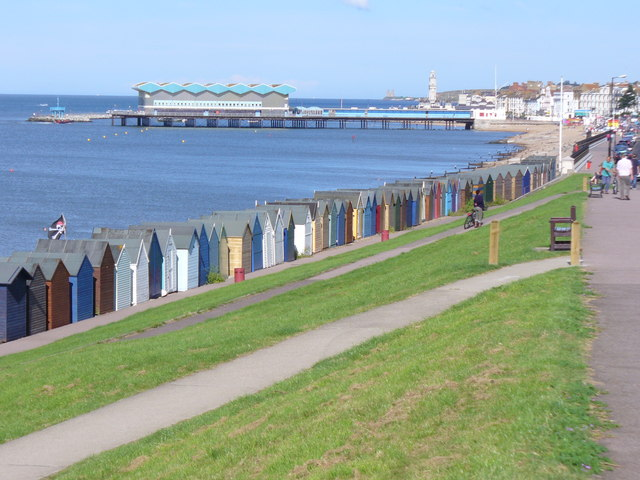
View of Cowshed, 2007

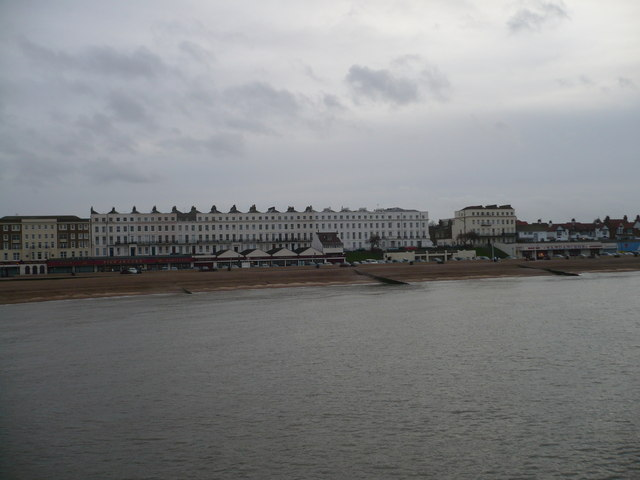
View from pierhead, 2009

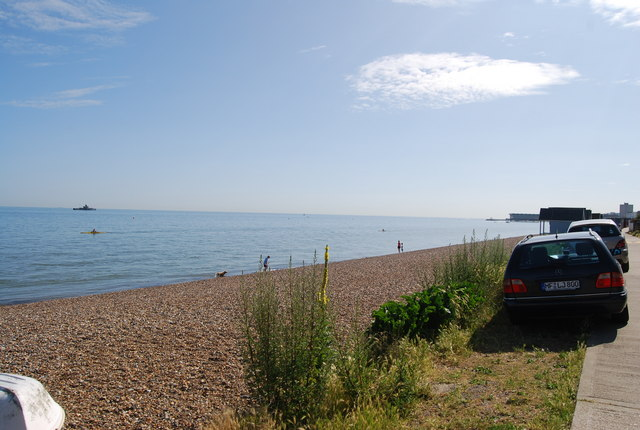
View of pier stub and pierhead from Hampton, 2009

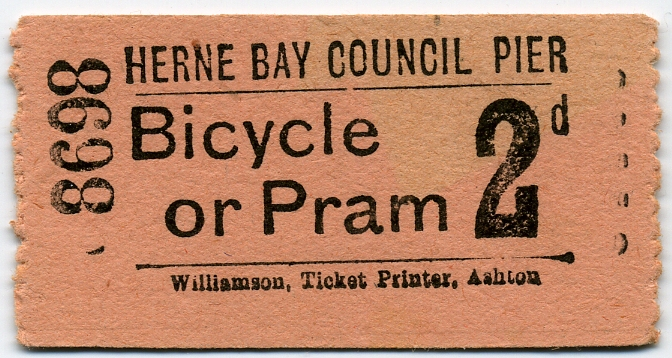
1921 ticket

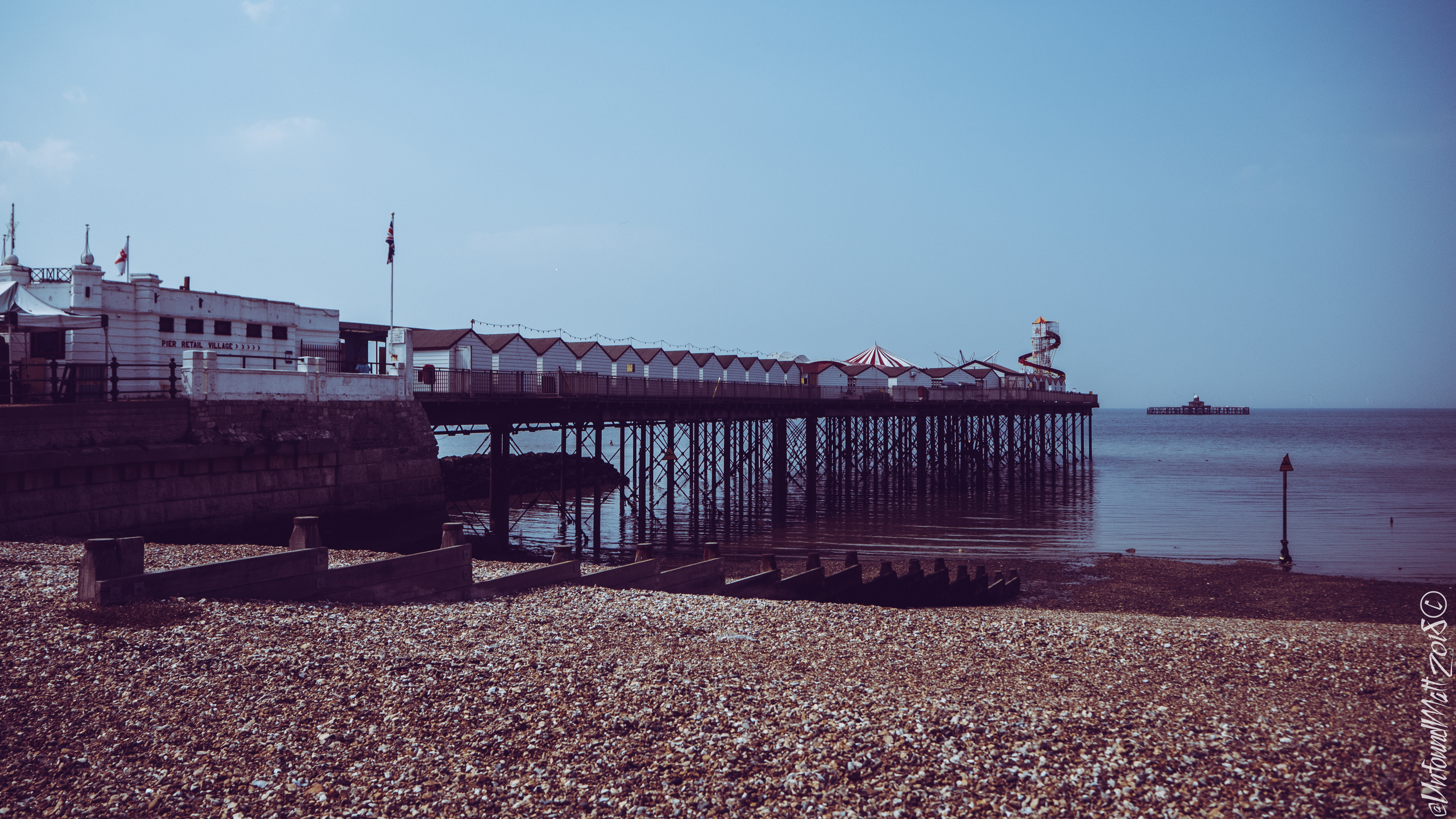
Herne Bay Pier July 2018

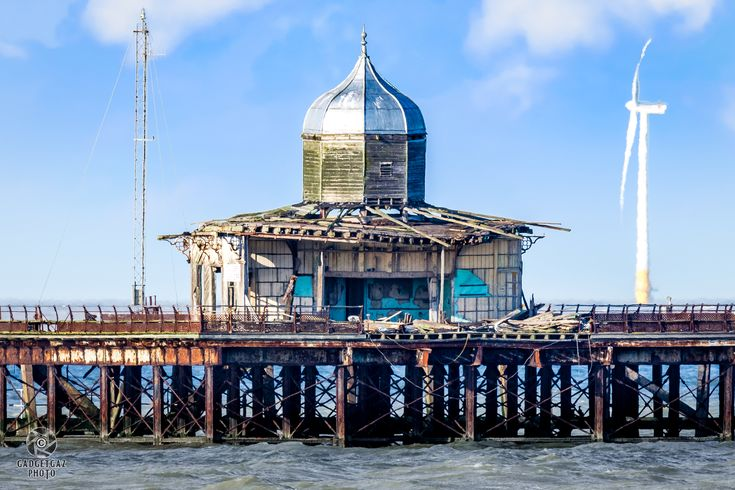
herne bay pier head 2018

== Bibliography ==
- Gough, Harold, Herne Bay's Piers, (Herne Bay Historical Records Society, 2008) (ISBN 9781904661078: illustrated with numerous historical photographs; a posthumous publication for Gough who died in 2008)
- Bundock, Mike, Victorian Herne Bay, (Herne Bay Historical Records Society, 2011) (ISBN 978-1-904661-16-0: includes 5 pages of photographs of the first and second piers; 1 page of photographs of construction of third pier.
