= Dagebüll =

Dagebüll Dagebøl (Danish) Doogebel (North Frisian)
- Municipality
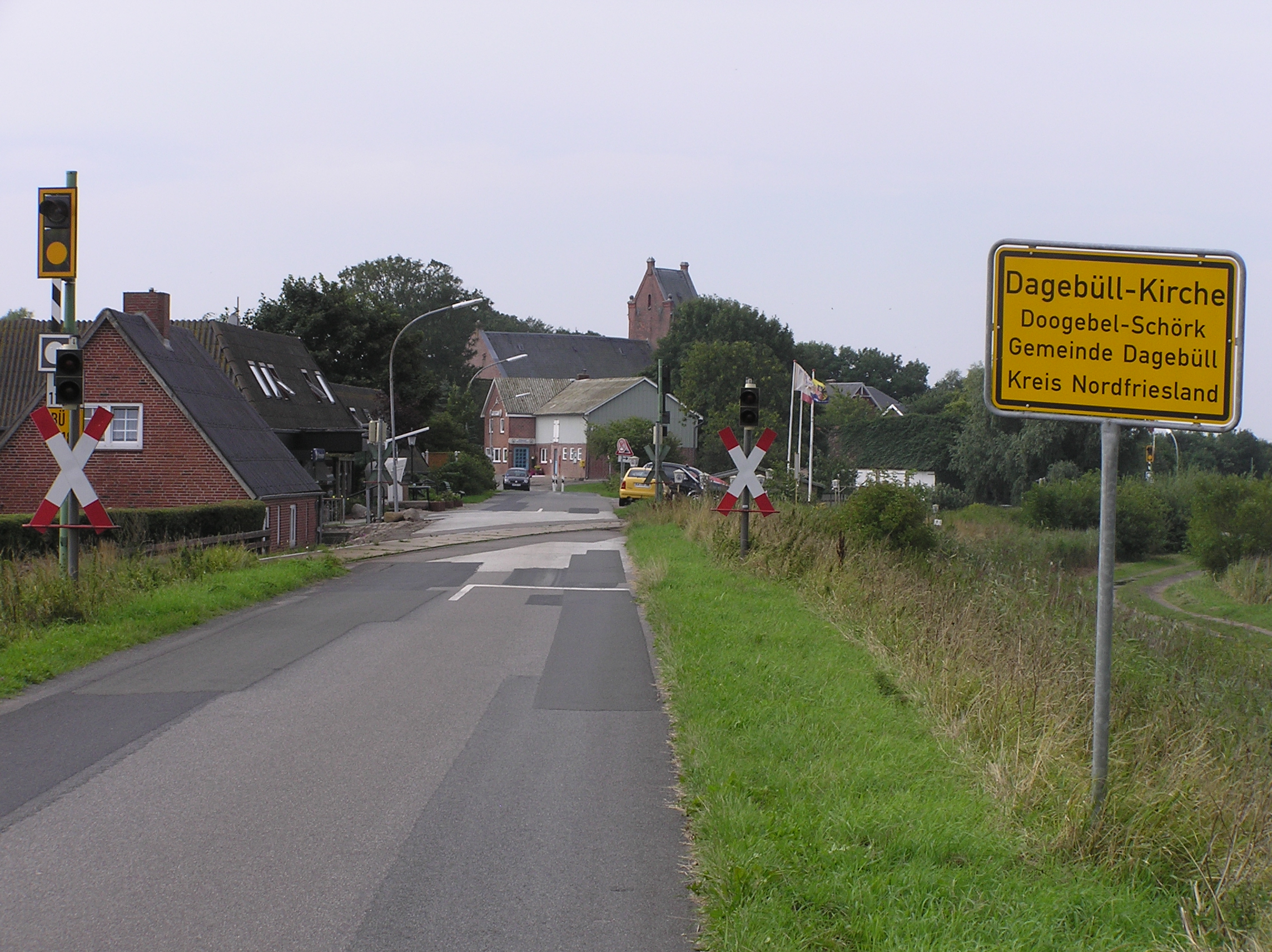
- View of Dagebüll-Kirche

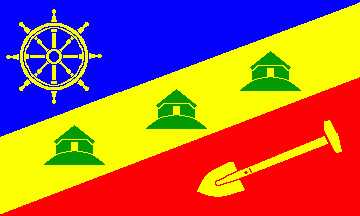
- Flag Coat of arms

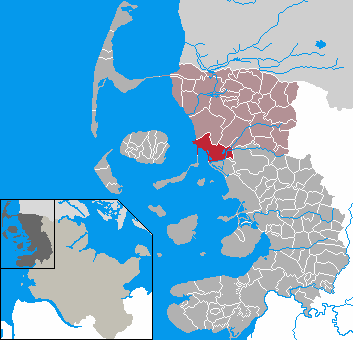
- Location of Dagebüll within Nordfriesland district
- Interactive map of Dagebüll
- Location within Germany Location within Schleswig-Holstein
- Coordinates: 54°44′N 8°43′E
- Country: Germany
- State: Schleswig-Holstein
- District: Nordfriesland
- Municipal assoc.: Südtondern

Government
  - Mayor: Hans-Jürgen Iwersen

Area
  - Total: 36.22 km^{2} (13.98 sq mi)
- Elevation: 3 m (9.8 ft)

Population (2025-12-31)
  - Total: 949
  - Density: 26.2/km^{2} (67.9/sq mi)
- Time zone: UTC+01:00 (CET)
  - Summer (DST): UTC+02:00 (CEST)
- Postal codes: 25899
- Dialling codes: 04667
- Vehicle registration: NF
- Website: www.dagebuell.net

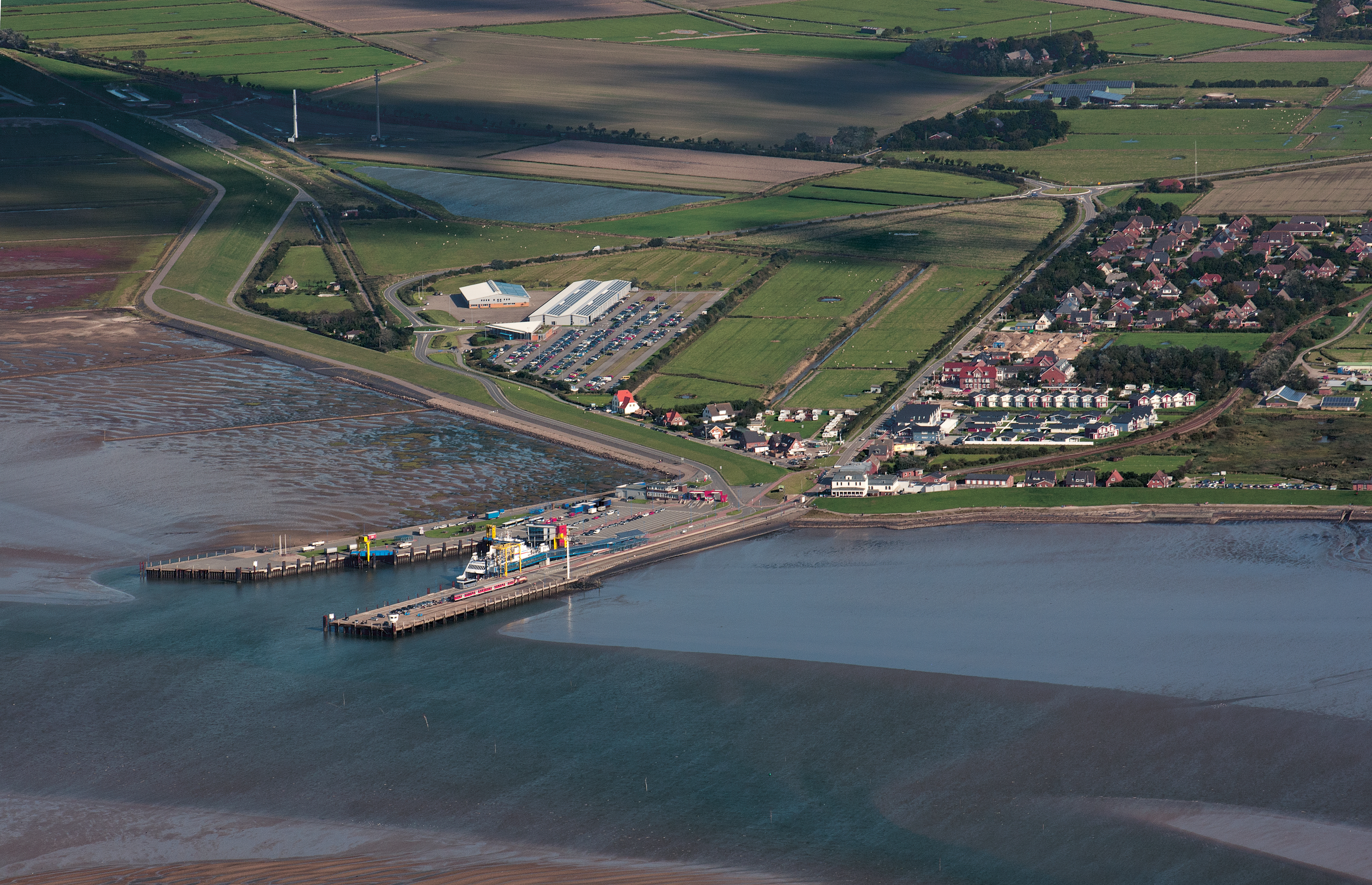
Dagebüll: aerial view

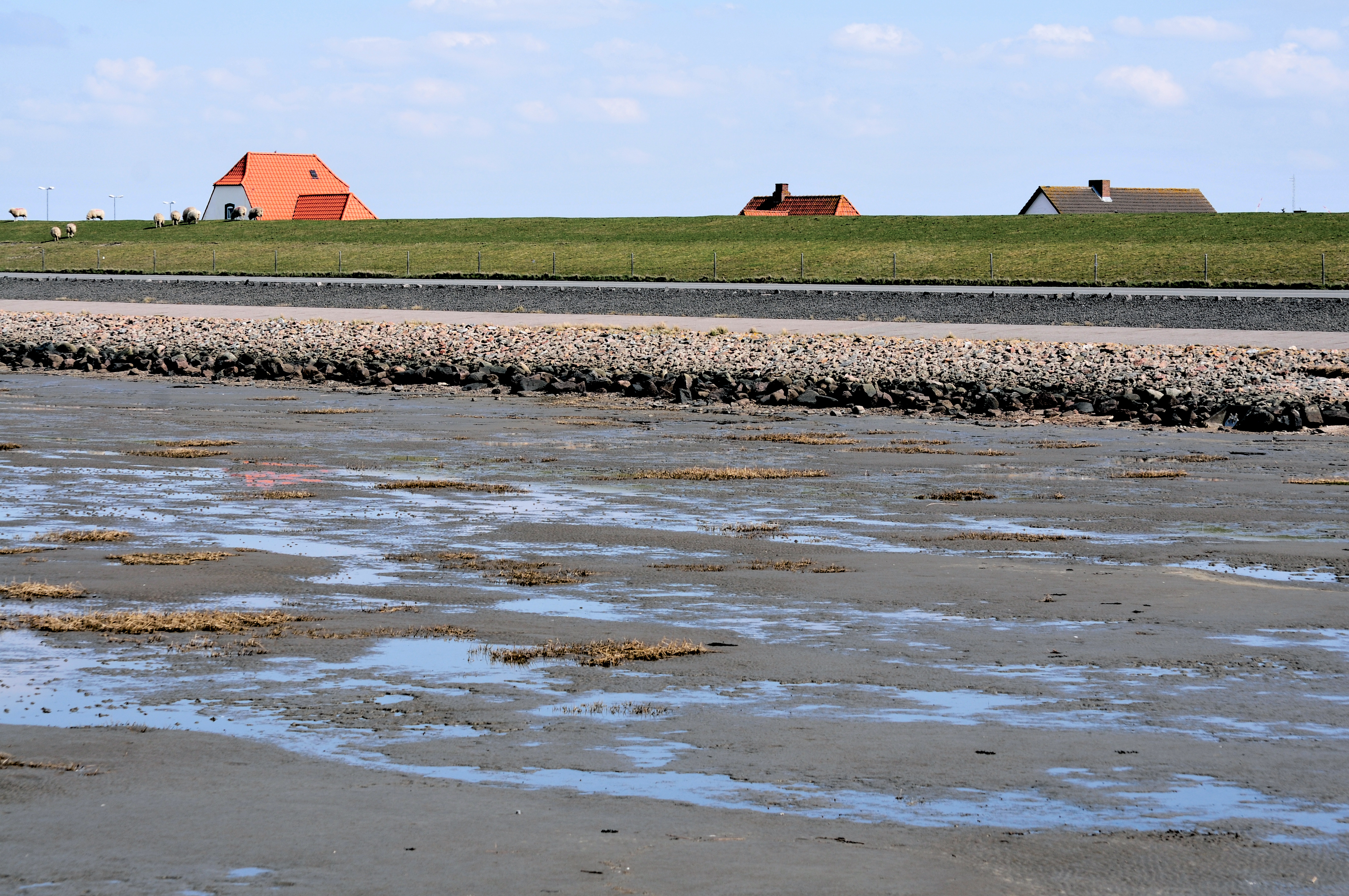
Dagebüll from the shore

Dagebüll (German: [ˈdaːɡəbʏl]; Mooring North Frisian: Doogebel; Danish: Dagebøl) is a municipality located at the west coast of Schleswig-Holstein in the Nordfriesland district, Germany. Today's Dagebüll was created in 1978 as a merger of the municipalities of Fahretoft, Juliane-Marien-Koog and Waygaard. Dagebüll used to be a Hallig, the oldest houses were built on artificial dwelling hills which in parts can still be seen today. In 1704 the area was secured by sea dikes.

== Districts ==
=== Dagebüll Kirche ===
The district of Kirche (Church; North Frisian: Doogebel Schörk) is situated in the centre of the Dagebüll polder, constituting the core of the former Hallig. Many old farmsteads can still be found on dwelling hills.

When the church was built in 1731, it did not yet have a bell tower. Only when funds had been raised in 1905/1906, it was decided to build a tower.

=== Dagebüll Hafen ===
The district of Dagebüll Hafen (Dagebüll Harbor; North Frisian: Doogebel Huuwen) is located about 3 kilometres to the west of Dagebüll Kirche, directly at the shoreline. A substantial part of visitors to the islands of Föhr and Amrum will leave the mainland via Dagebüll Hafen. The place provides many tourist facilities and a large parking lot and garage for customers of the ferry lines. South of the ferry terminal, there is the Dagebüll Lighthouse, which is not used any more.

Not far from the lighthouse, the facilities of the Water and Shipping Administration are situated, where the Hallig railway line Dagebüll–Oland–Langeneß starts on a 900 millimetres narrow gauge causeway.

=== Fahretoft ===
Fahretoft is located between Dagebüll and Waygaard. The municipality's sports club, TSV Fahretoft/Waygaard, founded in 1965, has its seat there. One of the polders in the area, the Bottschlotter Koog, was already created between 1633 and 1638, it was named after a local tidal creek. This polder hosts 28 inhabitants, all of whom mainly live on agriculture.

== History ==
The Dagebüll area used to be a tiny Hallig island, in 1626 it measured about 450 hectares. In the 16th and 17th century, several futile attempts were made to secure the area with dikes. It was impossible though to shut off all tidal creeks at once. At the Burchardi flood of 1634, Dagebüll suffered from a great loss of land.

In 1700, the inhabitants were granted a profitable charter, which allowed for the construction of a regular dike in 1702/1703. The new Dagebüll polder amounted to 502 hectares and relatively to the old Hallig, it was considerably shifted to the east. In 1704 a dam was built to connect the Dagebüll polder to the Old Christian Albrechts Polder. By the creation of the Kleisee Polder in 1727, Dagebüll eventually became part of the mainland.

== Traffic ==
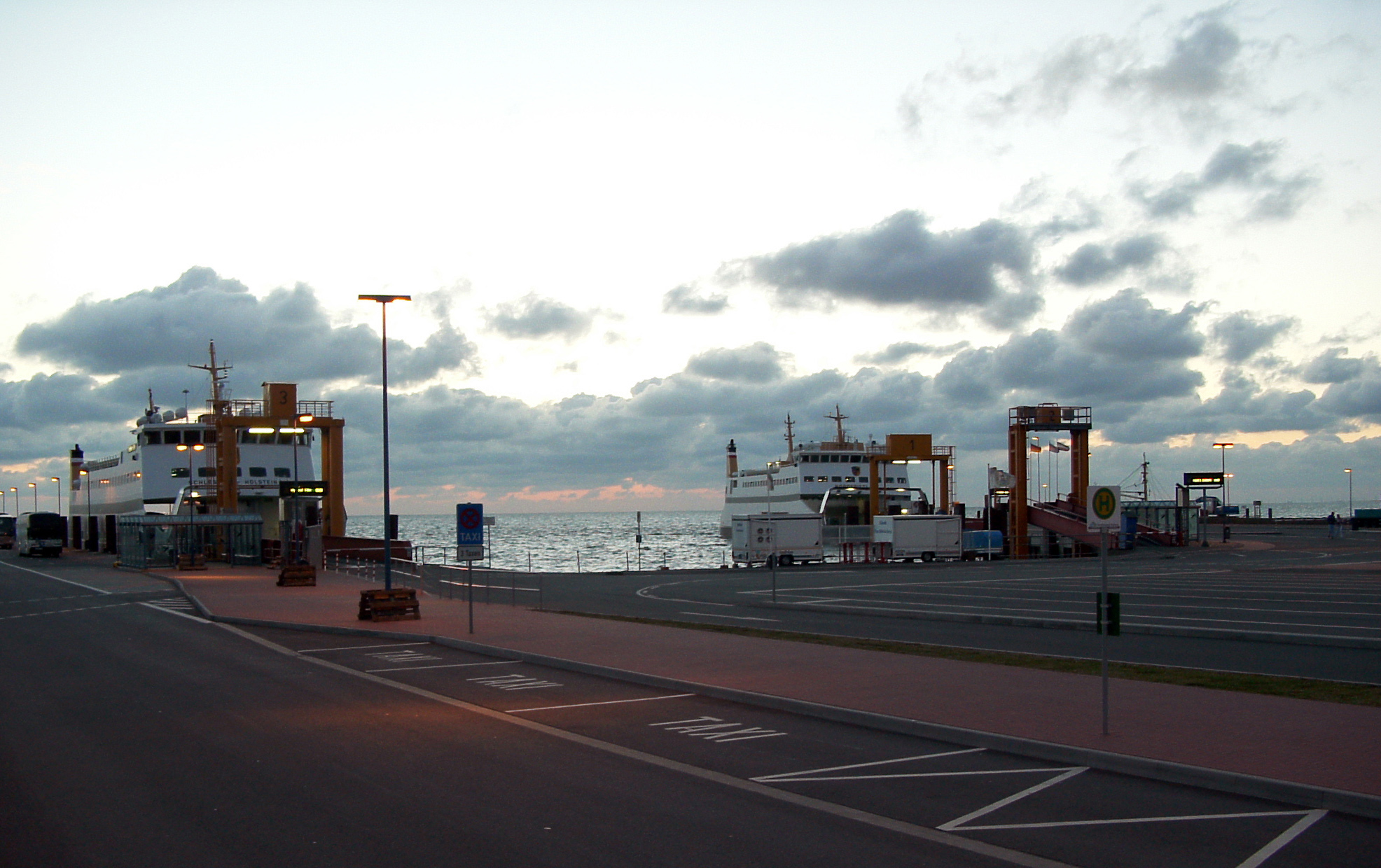
The ferry terminal at Dagebüll

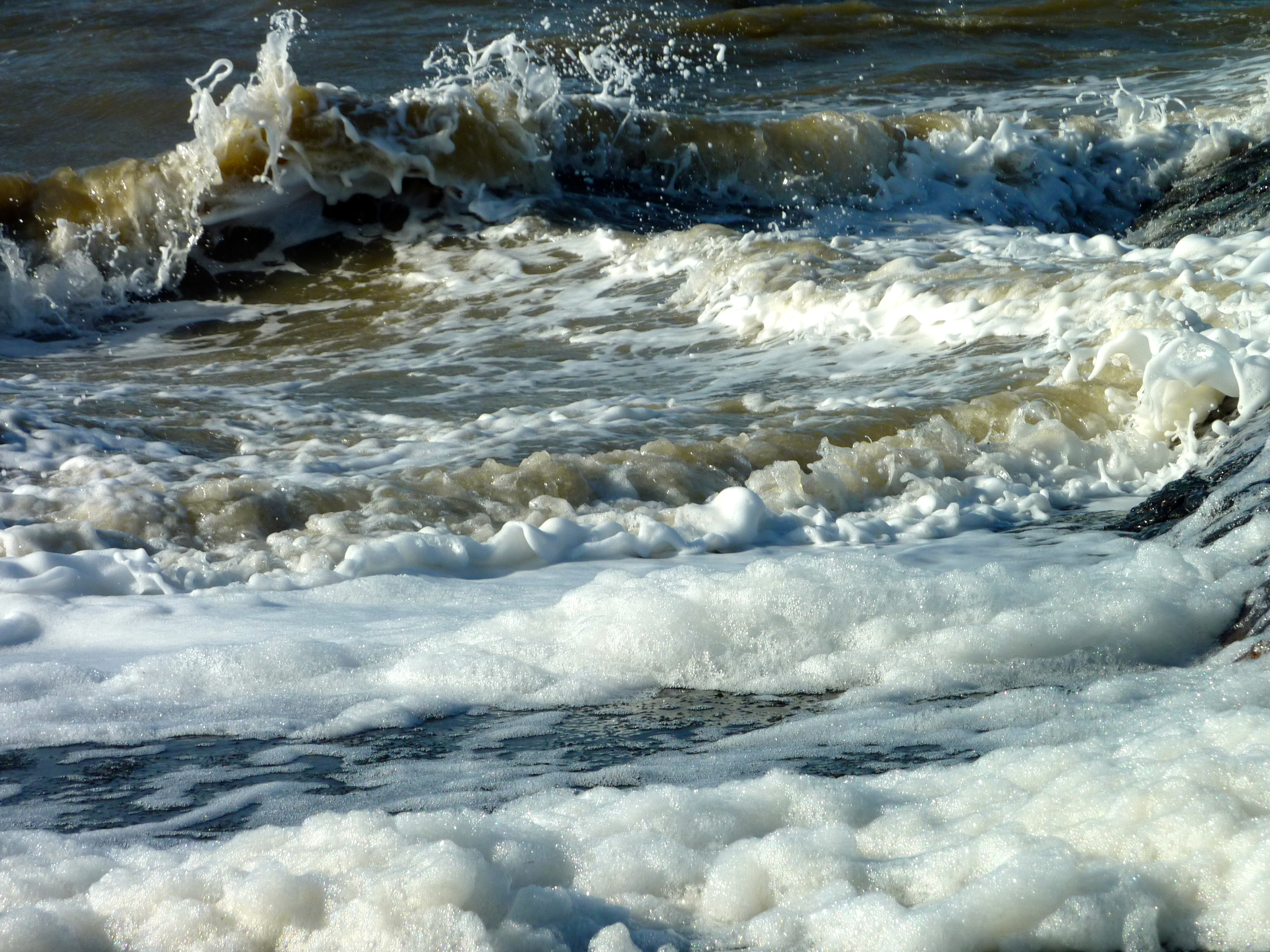
North Sea surf at Dagebüll

=== Shipping ===
The ferry terminal provides services to the islands of Föhr and Amrum, also minor freight ships, mussel cutters and other vessels frequent the port.

=== Railway ===
Dagebüll features two small stations of the Norddeutsche Eisenbahngesellschaft Niebüll (NEG) railway on the route to Niebüll: Dagebüll Mole (on the ferry pier) and Dagebüll Kirche. Moreover, there is an auxiliary station inside Dagebüll Hafen proper. This one is only used when the pier is flooded due to exceptionally high tides and storms.

Since 1929, a small causeway rail connects Dagebüll to the Halligen of Oland and Langeneß across the North Frisian Wadden Sea. The railway is only used for goods transport and coastal management though, not for passenger service. In the beginning, the locomotives used to have sails and thus were driven by the wind, later diesel engines were introduced.

=== Roads ===
Dagebüll can be reached by car from the south via Husum and Bredstedt and from the east via Niebüll on state roads.

== Politics ==
As of 2003, the SPD and the WDFW association held four seats each in the municipality council, the CDU held three.

== Parish ==
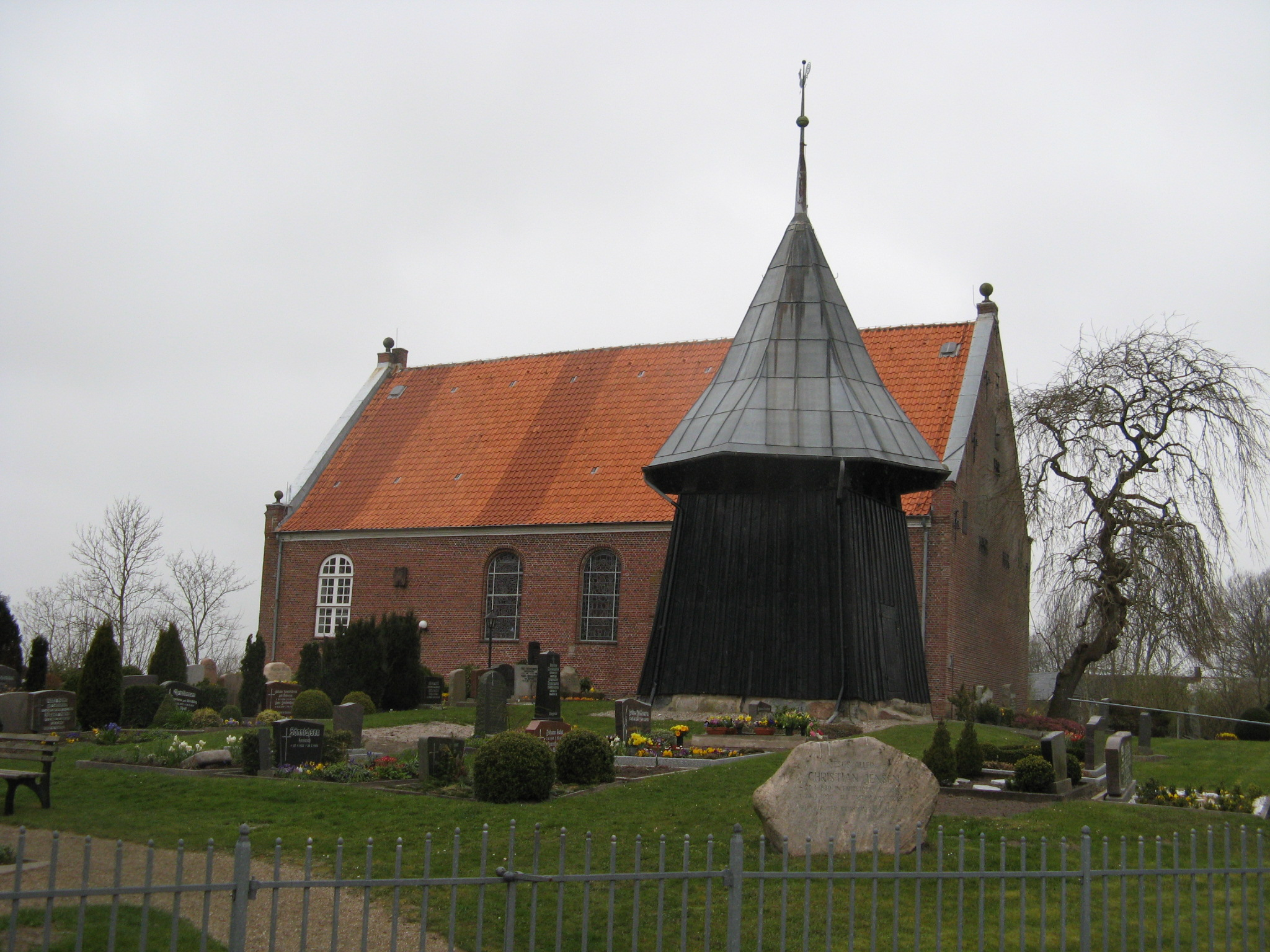
St. Lawrence church in Fahretoft

The Dagebüll parish consists of the two districts of Dagebüll and Fahretoft. There are two churches, St. Lawrence in Fahretoft, built in 1703 and St. Dionysus in Dagebüll.

== Education ==
The Hans Momsen School at Fahretoft is an elementary school with about 50 pupils from Fahretoft, Waygaard and Dagebüll proper. There are only four, sometimes five teachers.

Subjects taught include German language, mathematics, local history, physical education, North Frisian language, music, arts and religion. The school features a gymnasium and an outdoor sports field on which TSV Fahretoft/Waygaard's football team has its home matches.

The Hans Momsen School was built in 1963, the old schoolhouse was located on the Dagebüll church hill, next to the pastorate.

== Sports club ==
TSV Fahretoft/Waygaard e.V. is the local sports association, it was founded in 1965. Sports offered include football, table tennis, gymnastics and badminton. The annual highlights are the Sports Badge Awards and a local hiking rallye, both of which took place in summer.

== Notable people ==
- Hans Mollenhauer Millies (1883–1957), violinist and composer.
- Christian Jensen (1839–1900), missionary. Founded a missioning society with activities in the United States, Tanganyika, China and Papua New Guinea.
- Hans Momsen (1735–1811), farmer, mathematician and astronomer.
- Dr Frederik Paulsen Sr (born Friedrich Paulsen, 31 July 1909 in Dagebüll – 1997 in Alkersum) was a medical doctor and the founder of Ferring Pharmaceuticals.
