= Oland (Frisian island) =

Small North Frisian Hallig

Coordinates: 54°40′39″N 8°42′14″E

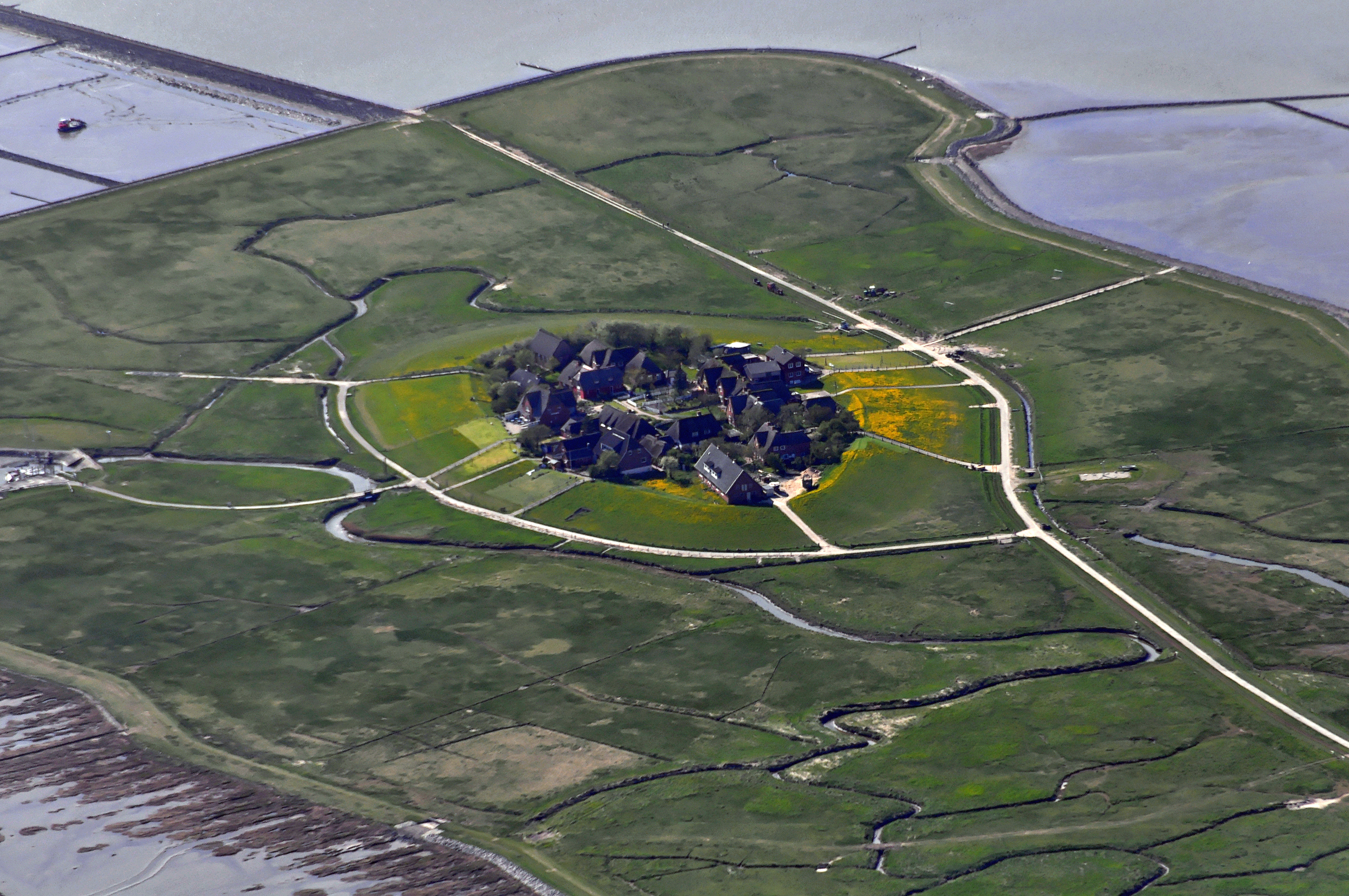
The hamlet of Oland as seen from the air.

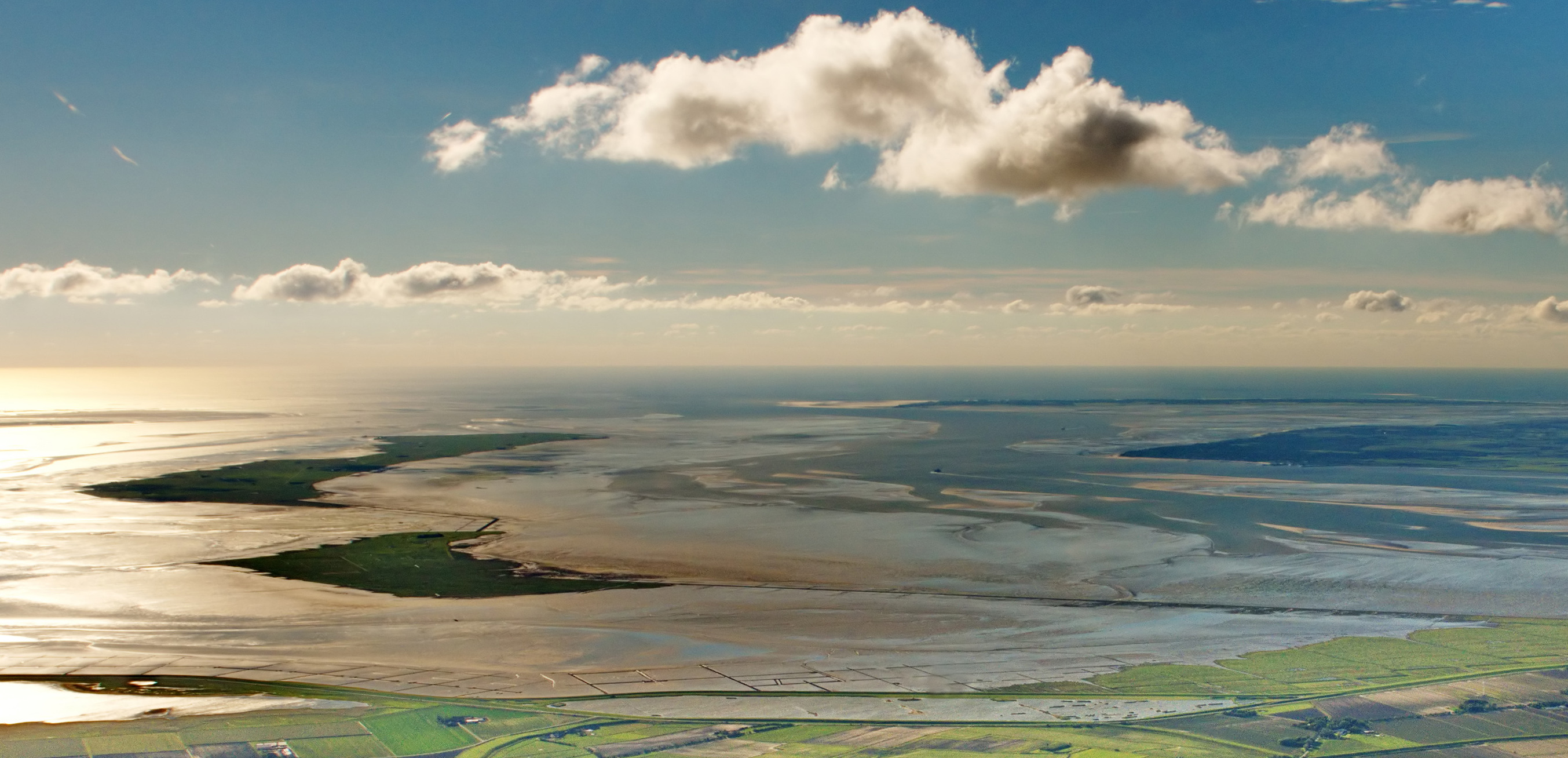
Oland (left), behind it Langeness, right Föhr with Amrum in the background.

Oland (German pronunciation: [ˈoːlant]; Danish: Øland, North Frisian: Ualöönist) is a small Hallig of the North Frisian Islands which is connected by a narrow-gauge railway to the mainland and to Hallig Langeneß. In 2019, the population was estimated, unofficially, to be 16 people.

Germany's smallest lighthouse is located here, being also the only one with a thatched roof.

== History ==
People have settled in this place since the Middle Ages, while today's Oland was connected to the Hallig Langeneß until the Burchardi flood in 1634. The Hallig became smaller as a result of numerous storm surges over the centuries. The second terp (Warft) of the Hallig was destroyed in a storm flood in 1850, so today's Oland consists of one large terp in the Wadden Sea.

Since 1927, Oland and Langeneß have been connected to the mainland by a dam with a narrow-gauge railway. Initially, the lorries on this railway were powered by sails, but later they switched to small combustion engines, which are still used today.

In addition, Oland has a small harbor. Vessels with a shallow draft can enter this harbor approximately between three hours before and three hours after high tide, during the rest of the time the access channel is almost dry.
