= Langeneß =

Langeneß Nees / Langenæs
- Municipality
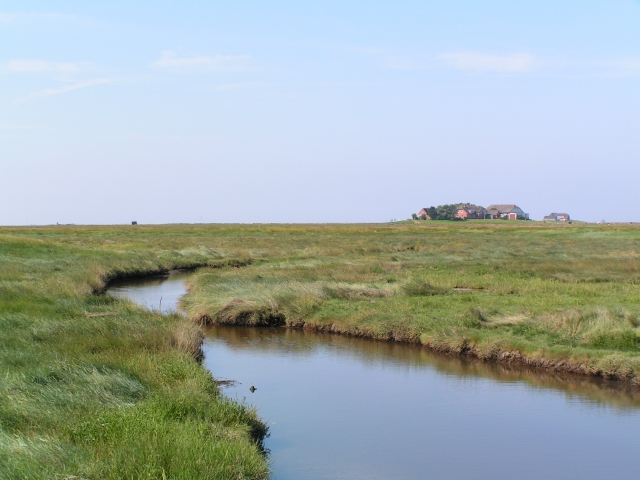

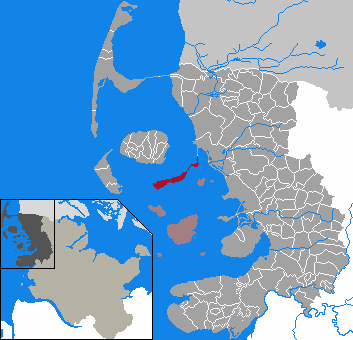
- Location of Langeneß; Nees / Langenæs within Nordfriesland district
- Interactive map of Langeneß; Nees / Langenæs
- Location within Germany Location within Schleswig-Holstein
- Coordinates: 54°38′24″N 8°36′6″E
- Country: Germany
- State: Schleswig-Holstein
- District: Nordfriesland
- Municipal assoc.: Pellworm

Government
  - Mayor: Heike Hinrichsen

Area
  - Total: 11.57 km^{2} (4.47 sq mi)
- Elevation: 1 m (3.3 ft)

Population (2025-12-31)
  - Total: 114
  - Density: 9.85/km^{2} (25.5/sq mi)
- Time zone: UTC+01:00 (CET)
  - Summer (DST): UTC+02:00 (CEST)
- Postal codes: 25863
- Dialling codes: 0 46 84
- Vehicle registration: NF
- Website: langeness.de

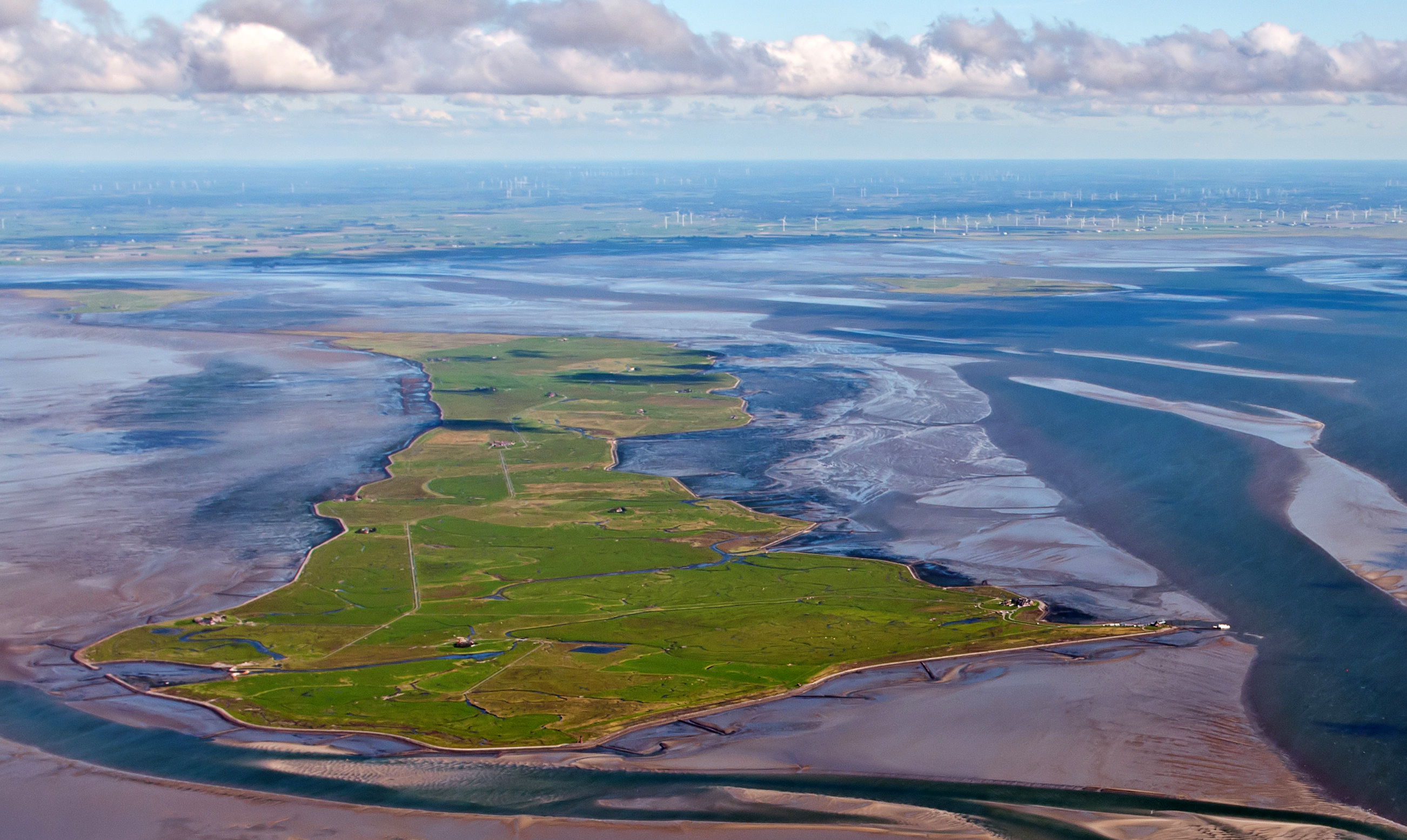
Langeneß

Langeneß (German pronunciation: [laŋəˈnɛs]; Danish: Langenæs; North Frisian: Nees) is a municipality in the district of Nordfriesland, in Schleswig-Holstein, Germany. It consists of the halligen (islands) Langeneß and Oland. Before the flood of 1634, the two islands were directly attached.

Langeneß itself has 16 Warften and is the largest Hallig. It has about 100 inhabitants and 58 households. There is a junior school and an information centre providing information about the national park and the Wadden-Sea at Peterswarf. A railway connects Langeneß to the mainland at Dagebüll via Oland for people who live on the islands. There is also a daily ferry service of W.D.R.
