= Rohwedder =

Rohwedder or Rohweder is a German surname. Notable people with the surname include:

- Detlev Karsten Rohwedder (1932–1991), German manager and politician
- Joachim Rohweder (1841–1905), German ornithologist
- Niels Rohweder (1906–1993), Danish architect
- Otto Frederick Rohwedder (1880–1960), American inventor and engineer
- Otto Rohwedder (1909–1969), German footballer
