= Jens Sörensen Wand =

Danish bird warden on Norderoog (1875–1950)

Jens Sørensen Wand also given as Wandt or Vand (28 April 1875 – 26 May 1950) was a Frisian bird warden on the island of Norderoog in Hallig Hooge, part of North Frisian Islands in the North Sea, off the coast of Germany. Wand protected nesting seabird colonies, particularly of nesting Sandwich terns. Seabird protection had begun in 1909 after some of the islands were purchased by the Jordsand bird protection organization. He was nicknamed the "Bird king of Norderoog."

Wand was born in Rolsø and little is known about his early life. He married Helene Marie Jespersen in 1889 and they lived in Brede near Bredebro north of Tønder during the winter and in summer he was often the only person to live on the island of Norderoog. He obtained his supplies from the nearby island of Hallig Hooge. He took up this position as a bird warden on 19 May 1909 and stayed there until his death in 1950. They had seven children. His wife drowned in a tidal creek between Hooge and Norderoog in 1914 and in 1950 he too drowned and died, at the same place. On the day of his death he had accompanied a film-maker named Venzl and a hiker and on the way back he was likely caught by the rising tide. His work involved keeping records of the numbers of birds nesting and to keep away any intruders. He came to be called the "Bird King of Norderoog" and sometimes as the "Hallig Robinson". His lonely life was the subject of much interest and he was the subject of many photographs and paintings. Wand's home built on stilts is now preserved as memorial.
