= Hainshallig =

Coordinates: 54.573355°N 8.608475°E

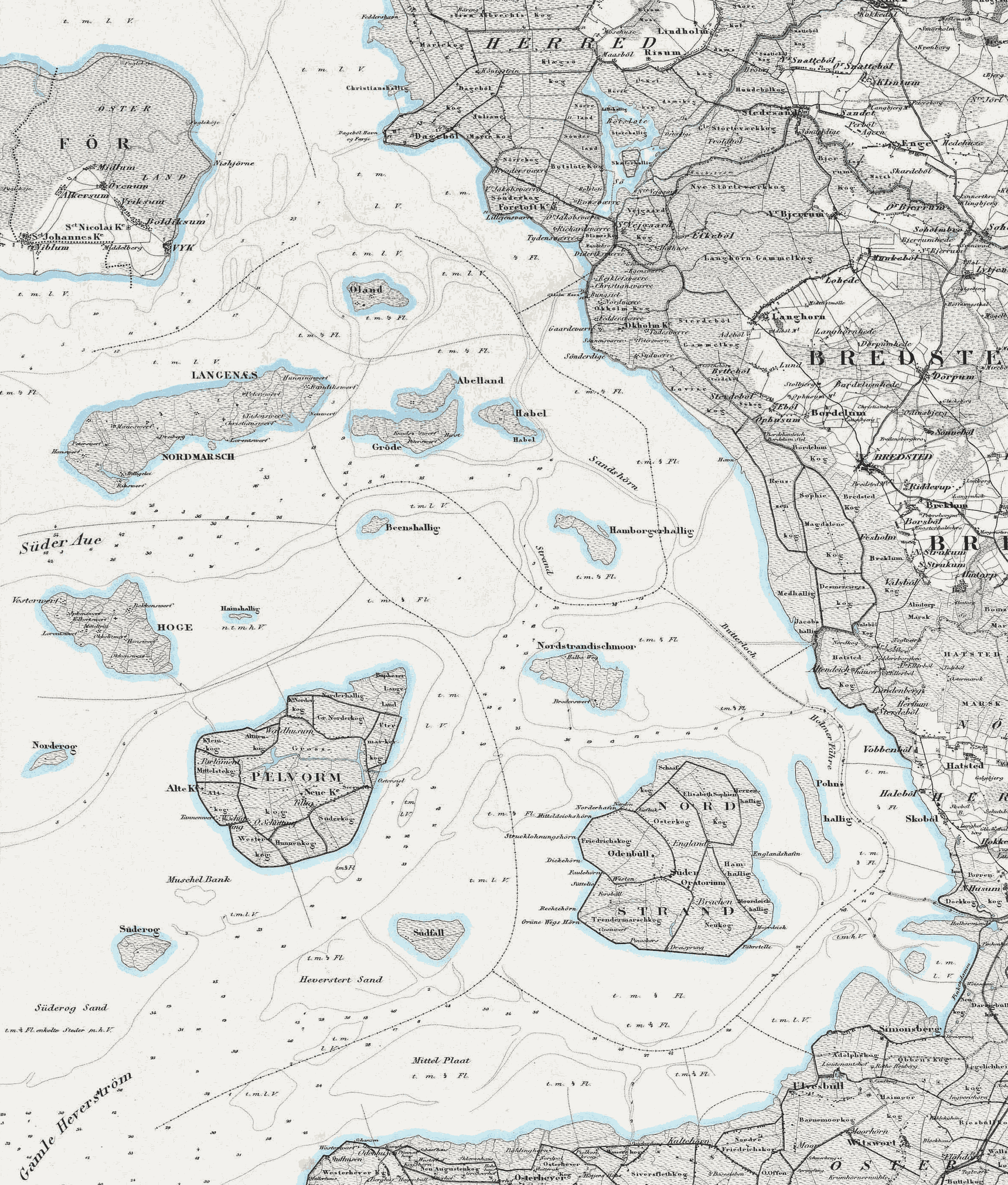
1858 map of North Frisian islands, including Hainshallig

Hainshallig (German pronunciation: [ˈhaɪnsˌhalɪç]; also spelled Hayenshallig) was a small Hallig in the North Frisian Wadden Sea, located east of the Hallig of Hooge, that was flooded and sank in 1860. At the time, Hainshallig was leased to a Hooge resident as part of a leasehold estate and was used for the production of hay. A levee may have once led from Hooge to Hainshallig. The area belonged to the Duchy of Schleswig, which was a fiefdom of the Danish crown, now Germany.
