= Hooge, Germany =

Hooge Huuge (nf) / Hoge (dan)
- Municipality
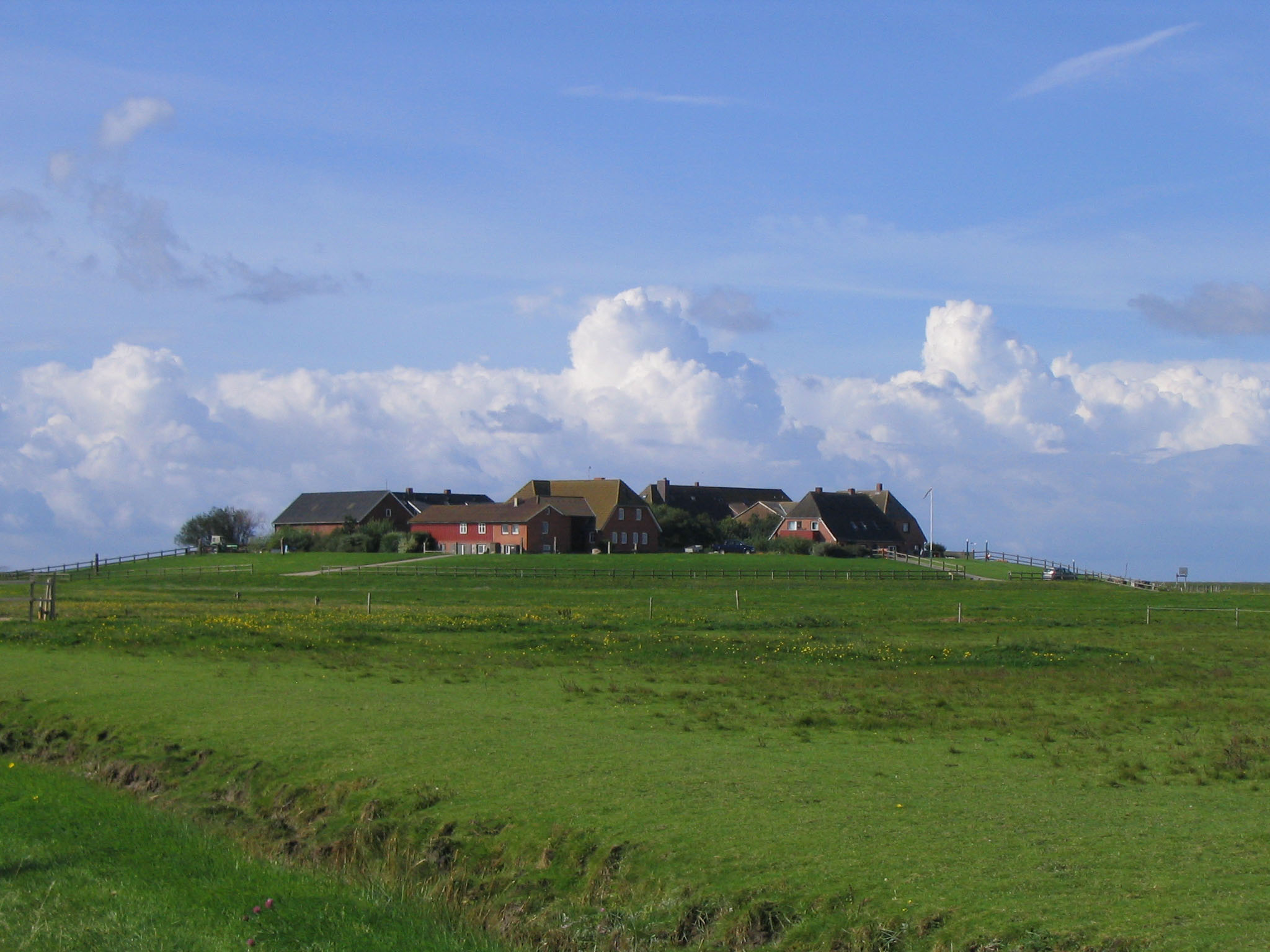

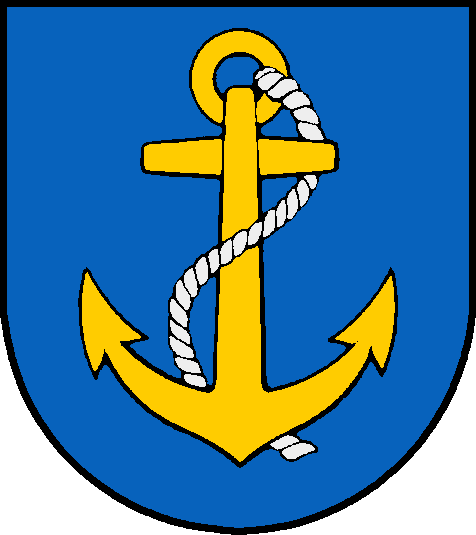
- Coat of arms

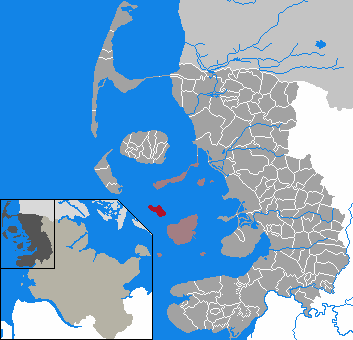
- Location of Hooge; Huuge (nf) / Hoge (dan) within Nordfriesland district
- Interactive map of Hooge; Huuge (nf) / Hoge (dan)
- Location within Germany Location within Schleswig-Holstein
- Coordinates: 54°34′12″N 08°32′53″E
- Country: Germany
- State: Schleswig-Holstein
- District: Nordfriesland
- Municipal assoc.: Pellworm

Government
  - Mayor: Michael Klisch SPD

Area
  - Total: 5.78 km^{2} (2.23 sq mi)
- Elevation: 5 m (16 ft)

Population (2025-12-31)
  - Total: 93
  - Density: 16/km^{2} (42/sq mi)
- Time zone: UTC+01:00 (CET)
  - Summer (DST): UTC+02:00 (CEST)
- Postal codes: 25859
- Dialling codes: 04849
- Vehicle registration: NF
- Website: www.hooge.de

Hooge (German pronunciation: [ˈhoːgə]; Danish: Hoge, North Frisian: Huuge) is a municipality in the district of Nordfriesland, in Schleswig-Holstein, Germany.

The municipality is located on the island of Hooge – a small island off the coast of Germany. It is the second largest of the ten halligen in the Wadden Sea, after Langeneß. It is frequently called the Queen of the Halligen. The houses on the island are built on ten Warften ('artificial dwelling mounds').

The municipality (Gemeinde) Hooge also includes the uninhabited hallig Norderoog.

== Settlements and geography ==
Hooge has 9 populated Warften:

- Backenswarft
- Kirchwarft
- Ockelützwarft
- Hanswarft
- Ockenswarft
- Lorenzwarft/Mitteltritt (double-terpen)
- Volkertswarft
- Ipkenswarft
- Westerwarft

The Pohnswarft still can be found close to the shore of Hooge. The Pohnswarft is an unpopulated Warft which has been abandoned due to its unfavourable location. There is only a water gauge on it.

The small island of Hainshallig, located off the east coast of Hooge, may have once been connected to the island by a levee and belonged to a Hooge resident, but became flooded and sank in 1860.

== Farmers protest incident 2024 ==
In January 2024, Federal Minister of Economics Robert Habeck (A90/Greens) visited Hooge. On the return ferry journey, protesting farmers were waiting, who escalated the situation so much that the ferry left again for safety reasons.

The spontaneous protest of ordinary farmers was something Habeck was not expecting. The local hobby artist Tanja Berkhahn was on the ferry to Hooge and told her partner that Habeck is doing a day trip to Hooge. Her partner, the agriculture freelancer Holger T. mobilized in right-wing Telegram groups as well as in local farmer groups for a protest action. He is considered to be the main organizer of the violating protest by weekly Die Zeit.

== Photo gallery ==
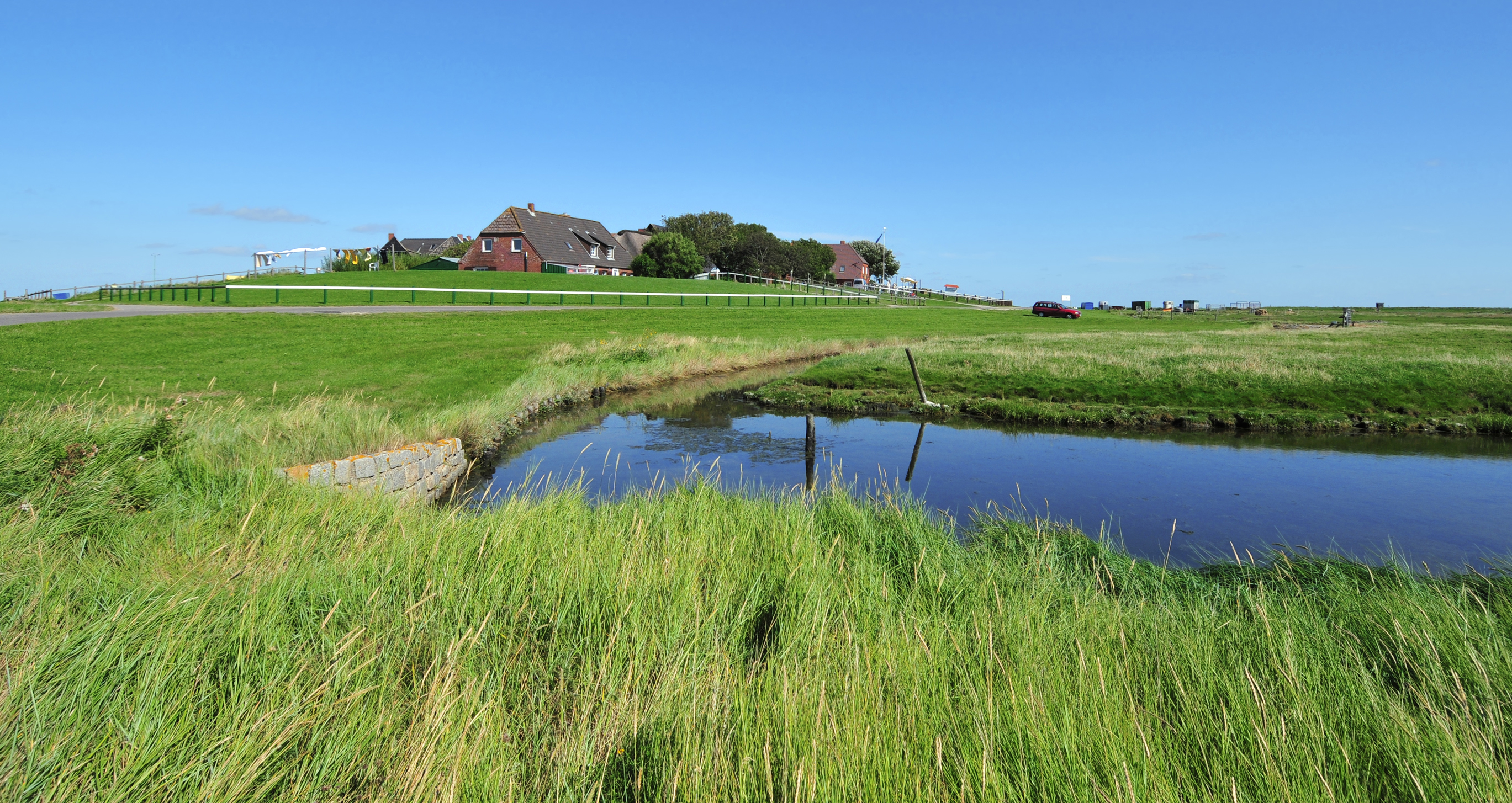
Backenswarft

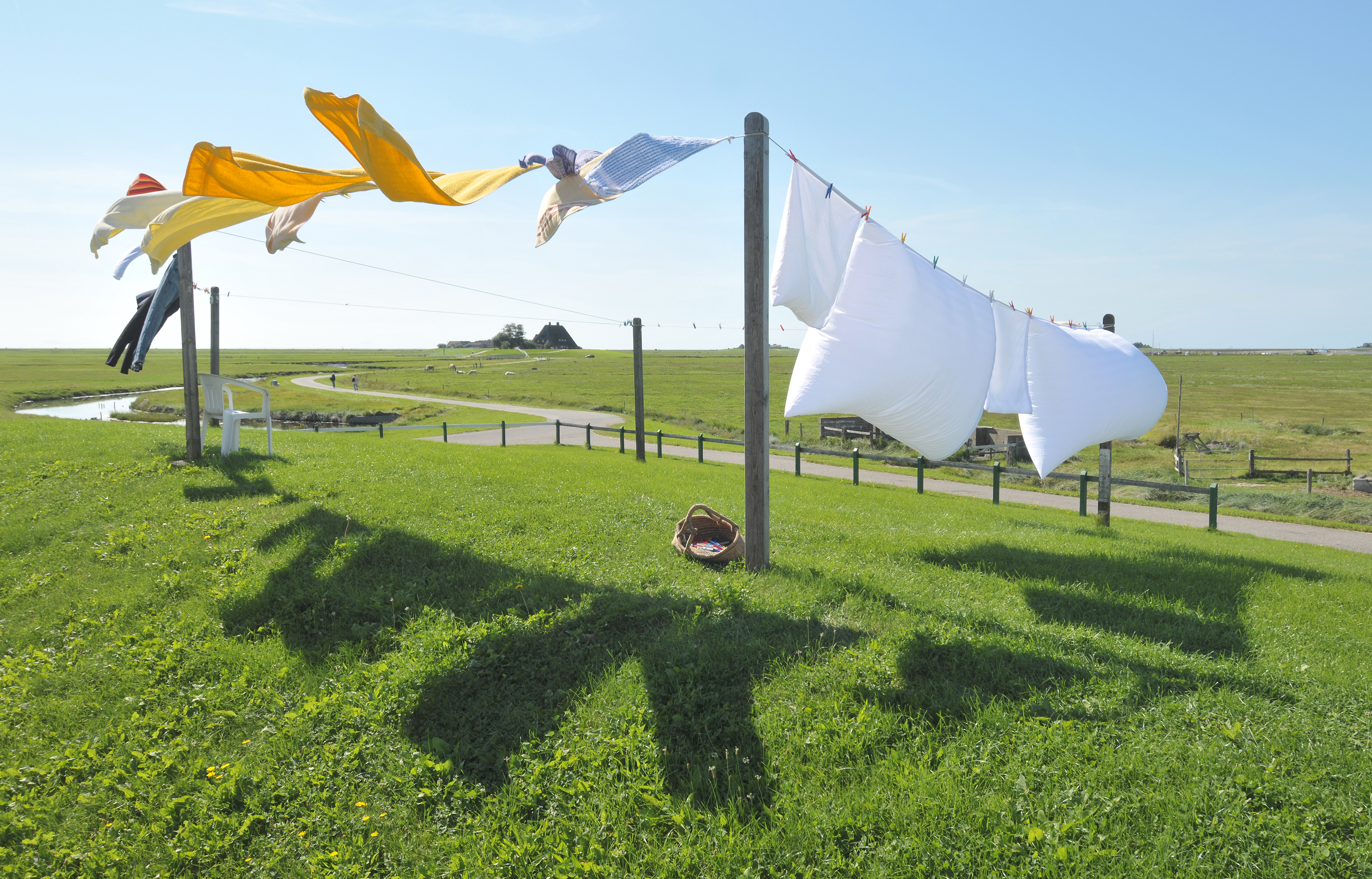
View from the Backenswarft on Hooge.

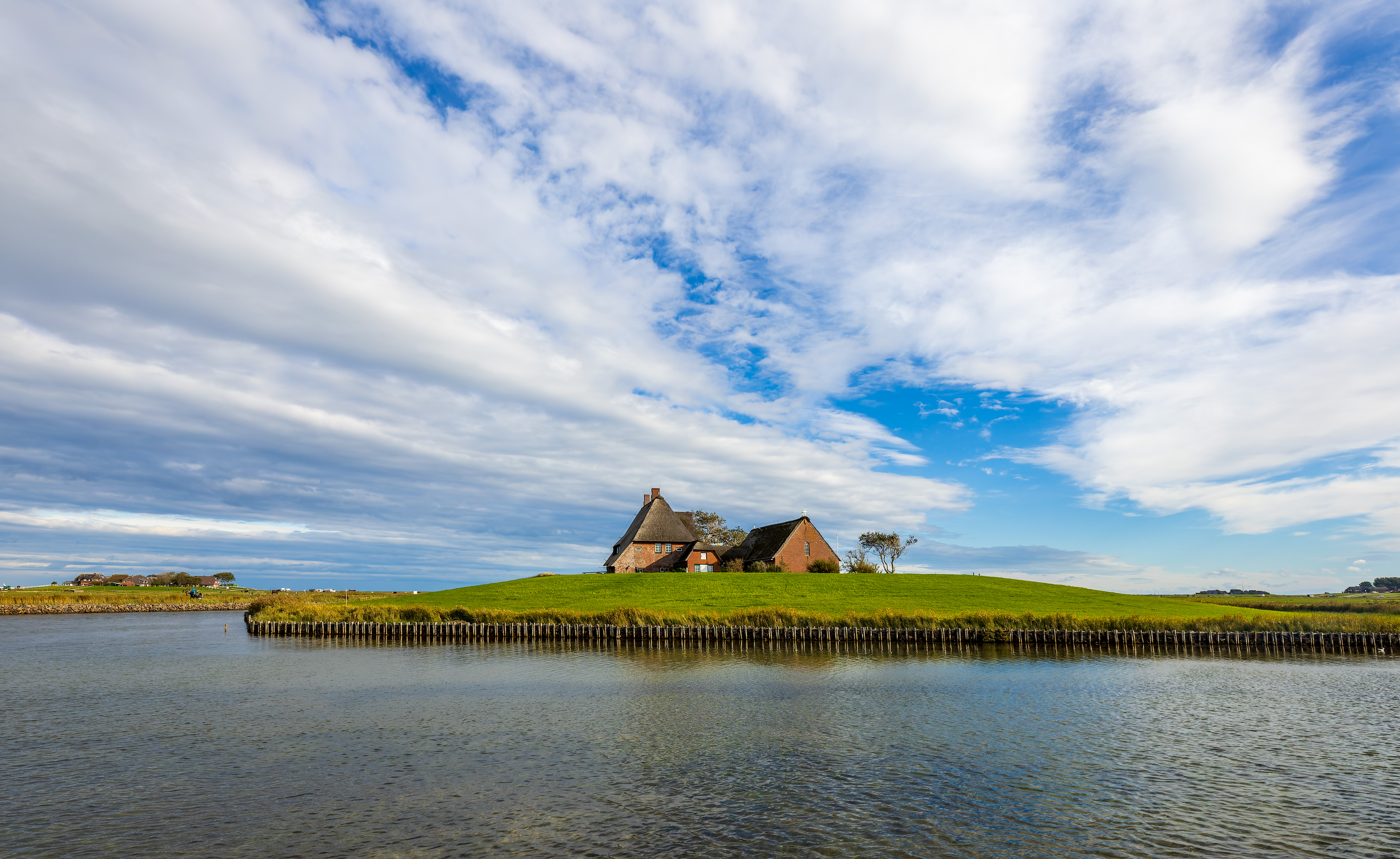
Kirchwarft

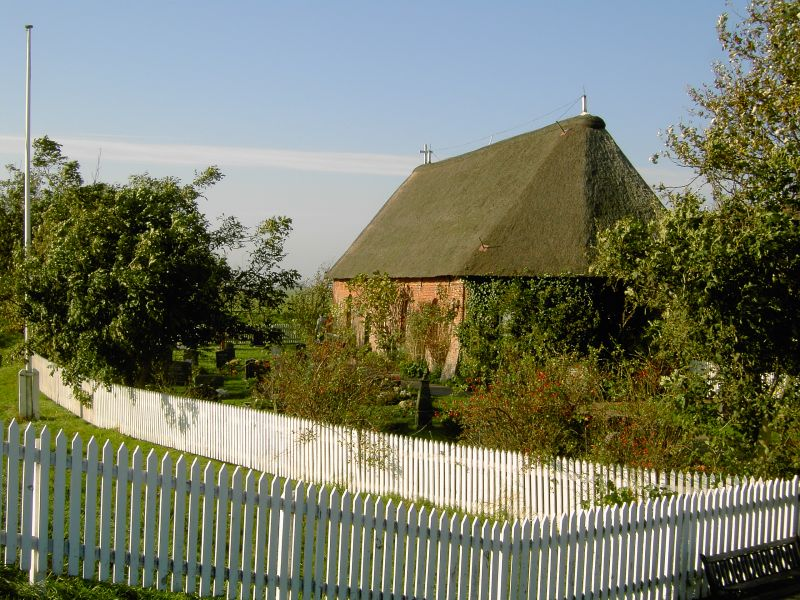
Hooge church

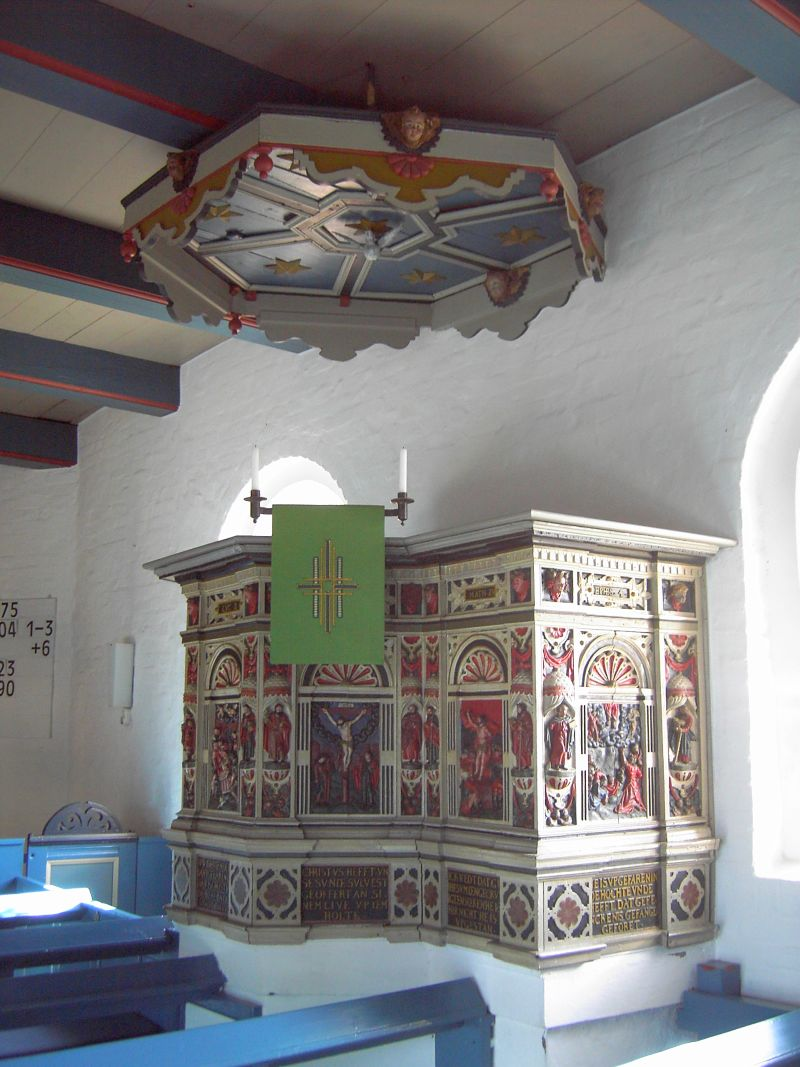
Pulpit in the church of Hooge

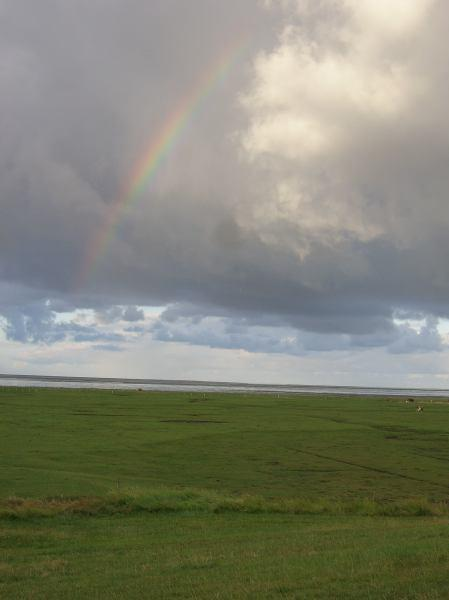
Rainbow over Hallig Hooge

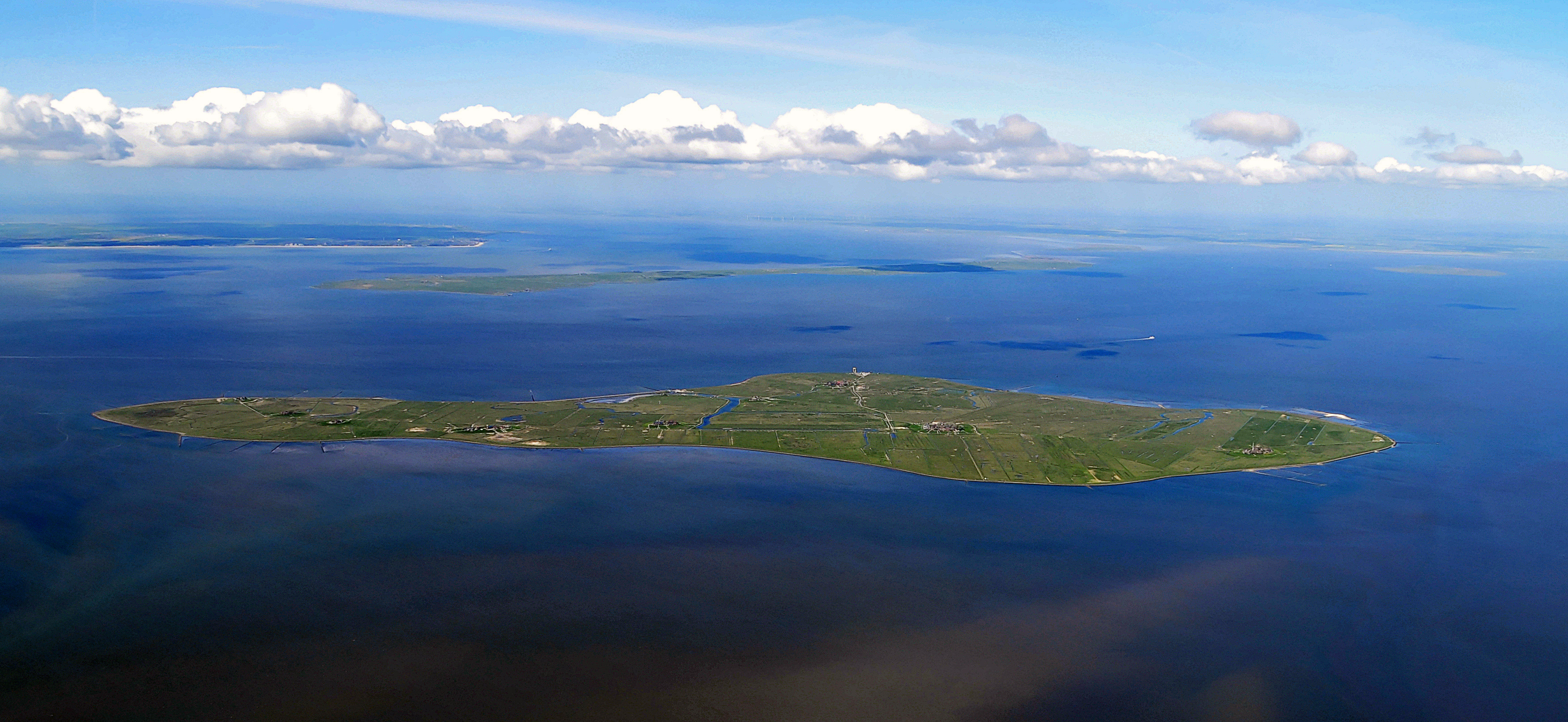
