= Norderoog =

German halligen island

Native name: Noorderuug
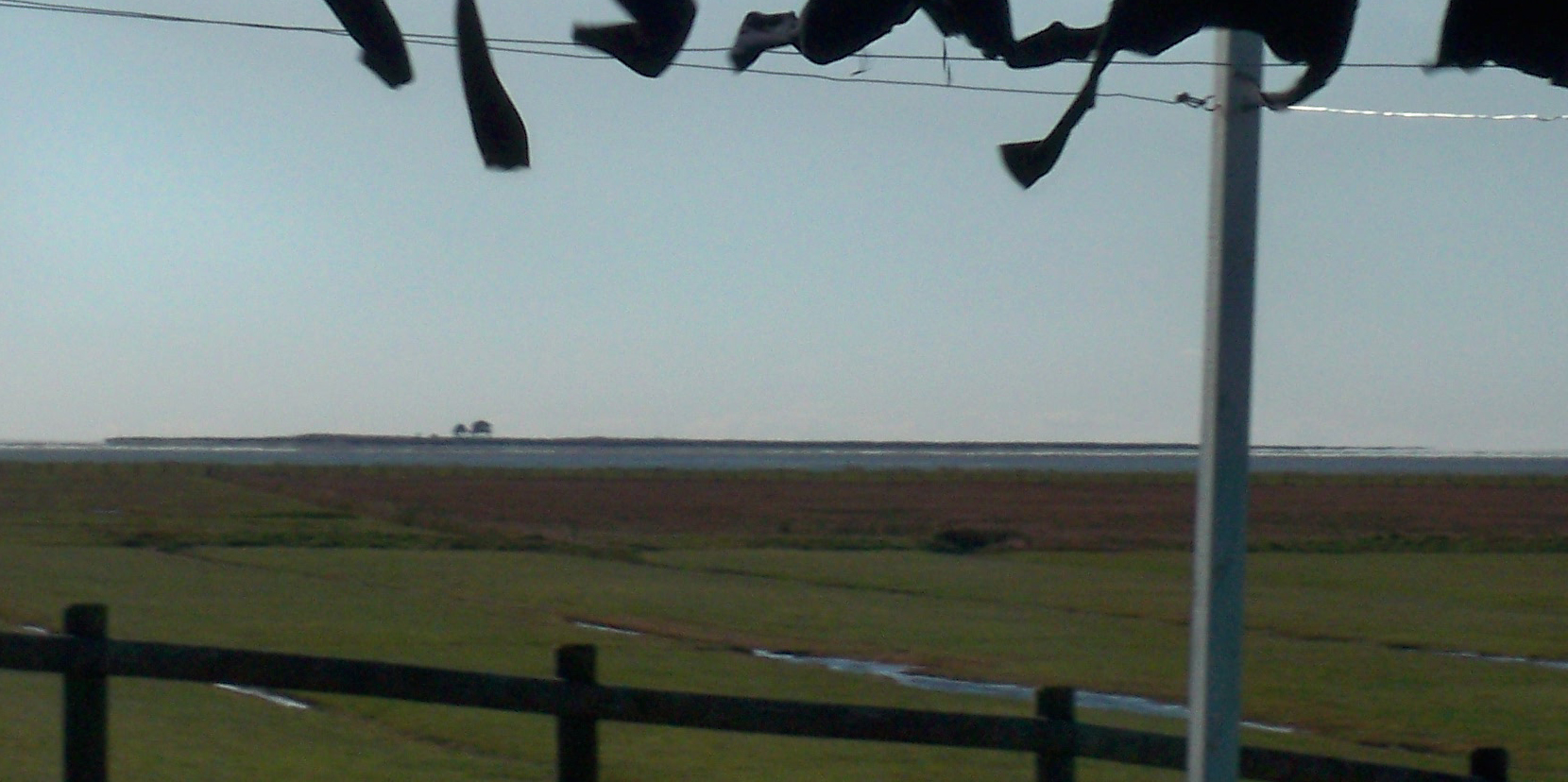
- Norderoog as seen from Hooge island
- Interactive map of Norderoog

Geography
- Location: Wadden Sea
- Coordinates: 54°32′N 8°30′E
- Archipelago: North Frisian Islands
- Area: 9 ha (22 acres)
- Length: 640 m (2100 ft)
- Width: 210 m (690 ft)
- Highest elevation: 1 m (3 ft)

Administration
- Germany
- State: Schleswig-Holstein
- District: Nordfriesland

Demographics
- Population: unpopulated

Norderoog (German pronunciation: [ˈnɔʁdɐˌʔoːk]; Halligen Frisian: Noorderuug, Danish: Nørreog) is one of the ten German halligen islands of the North Frisian Islands in the Wadden Sea, which is part of the North Sea off the coast of Germany. A part of Hooge municipality, the island belongs to the Nordfriesland district.

It is only temporarily inhabited by a bird warden from March to October. The refuge hut at the northeastern end is called Jens Wand Hütte, named after the warden Jens Sorensen Wand, which is built on stilts to protect it from flooding. A former terp had been washed away. It has been the site of several ecological studies.

== History ==
The island was first recorded in 1597 as Norder Ough. In 1630 there was a permanent estate on Noorderoog that was inhabited by a beach warden. This dwelling was destroyed in the Burchardi flood of 1634. Later, another family settled there but their house was washed away in the February flood of 1825. From then, Norderoog remained uninhabited. It is the only hallig that does not have a terp for dwelling. Since 1909, the island is owned by Verein Jordsand, an association that promotes the creation of bird refuges along the German North Sea coast.

== Fauna and flora ==
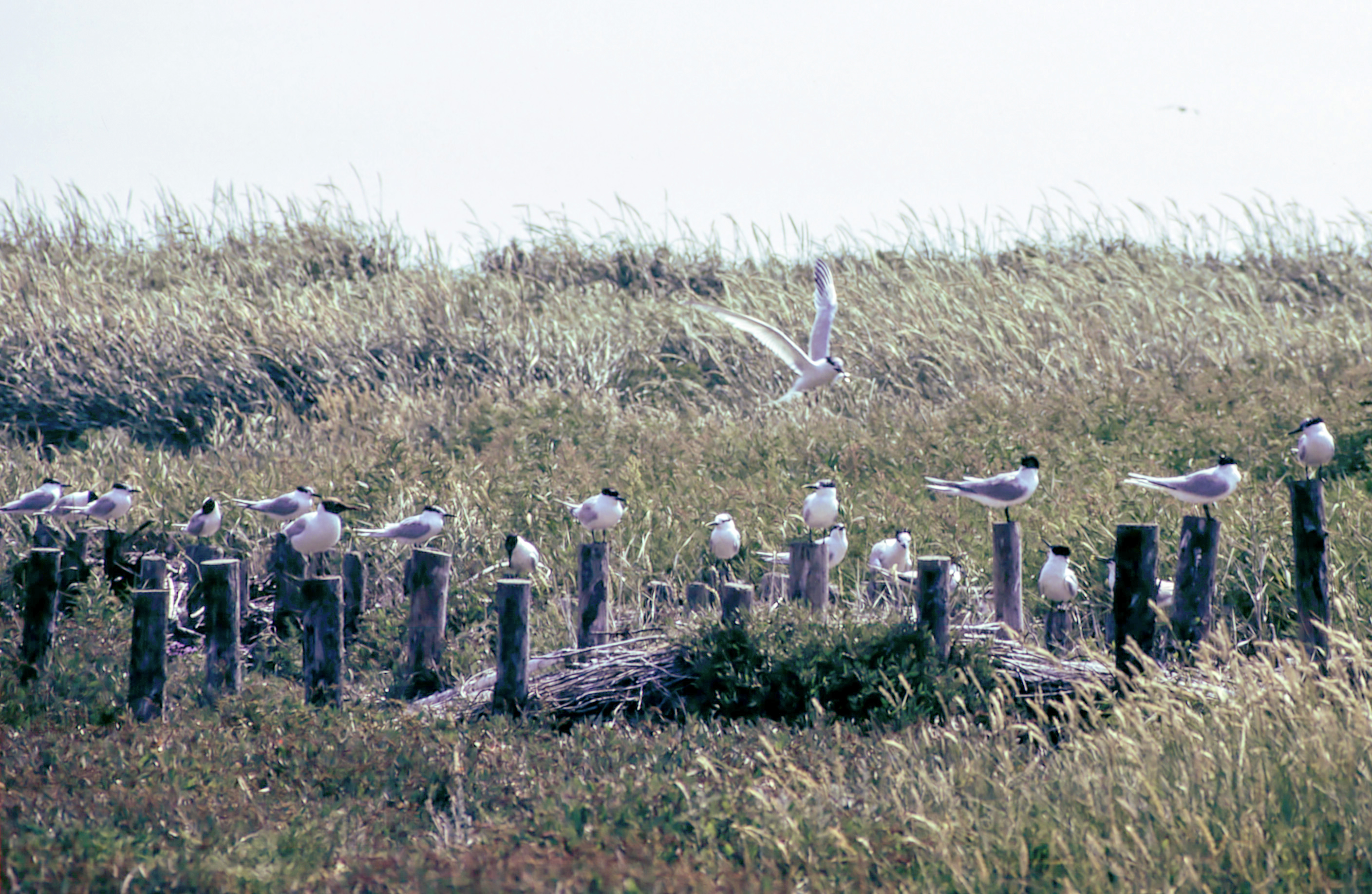
A colony of Sandwich terns on Norderoog

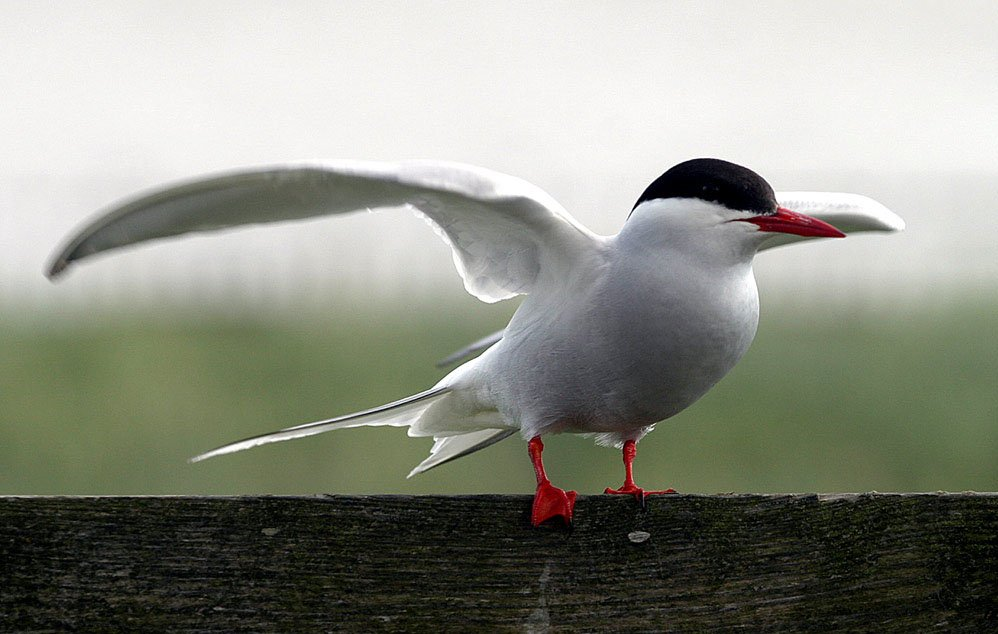
Arctic tern on Norderoog

Norderoog is a resting and hatching place for a number of rare species of marine birds. Notably the Sandwich tern (Sterna sandvicensis) has a colony. Their protection was initiated following studies made in 1893 by Joachim Rohweder. During spring and early summer, up to 5,000 couples will breed there annually. In 2007, 2,800 breeding couples were counted. Floodings of the island in summer are however a negative factor for breeding and may cause significant statistical deviations.

Apart from the Sandwich tern, also common tern (Sterna hirundo) and Arctic tern (Sterna paradisaea) use to breed on Norderoog. For a long time, Norderoog was the Eurasian oystercatcher's (Haematopus ostralegus) most densely populated breeding colony in the German Bight, but recently the population has dropped. Norderoog is however not only an important breeding resort but it is a resting area for migratory birds. At times, some 50,000 marine birds will occur on Norderoog and Norderoogsand, a shoal off the island.

The flora of Norderoog is dominated by salt marsh vegetation like Salicornia and Spartina at the immediate shoreline, and meadows with sea sandwort and sea lavender. The centre of the island has a steppe character with plants such as reed and Leymus arenarius.

A colony of Brown rats (R. norvegicus) also live on the island. As the island is mostly devoid of human populations, these rats have been observed stalking and catching sparrows and large birds such as ducks for food.

=== Index of breeding bird species ===
Common name	Scientific name	Couples in 2005
Common shelduck	Tadorna tadorna	4
Mallard	Anas platyrhynchos	14
Common eider	Somateria mollissima	30
Red-breasted merganser	Mergus serrator	3
Eurasian oystercatcher	Haematous ostralegus	90
Common redshank	Tringa totanus	10
Black-headed gull	Larus ridibundus	950
Common gull	Larus canus	4
Lesser black-backed gull	Larus fuscus	12
European herring gull	Larus argentatus	180
Sandwich tern	Sterna sandvicensis	2400
Common tern	Sterna hirundo	51
Arctic tern	Sterna paradisaea	109
Meadow pipit	Anthus pratensis	7

== Protection ==
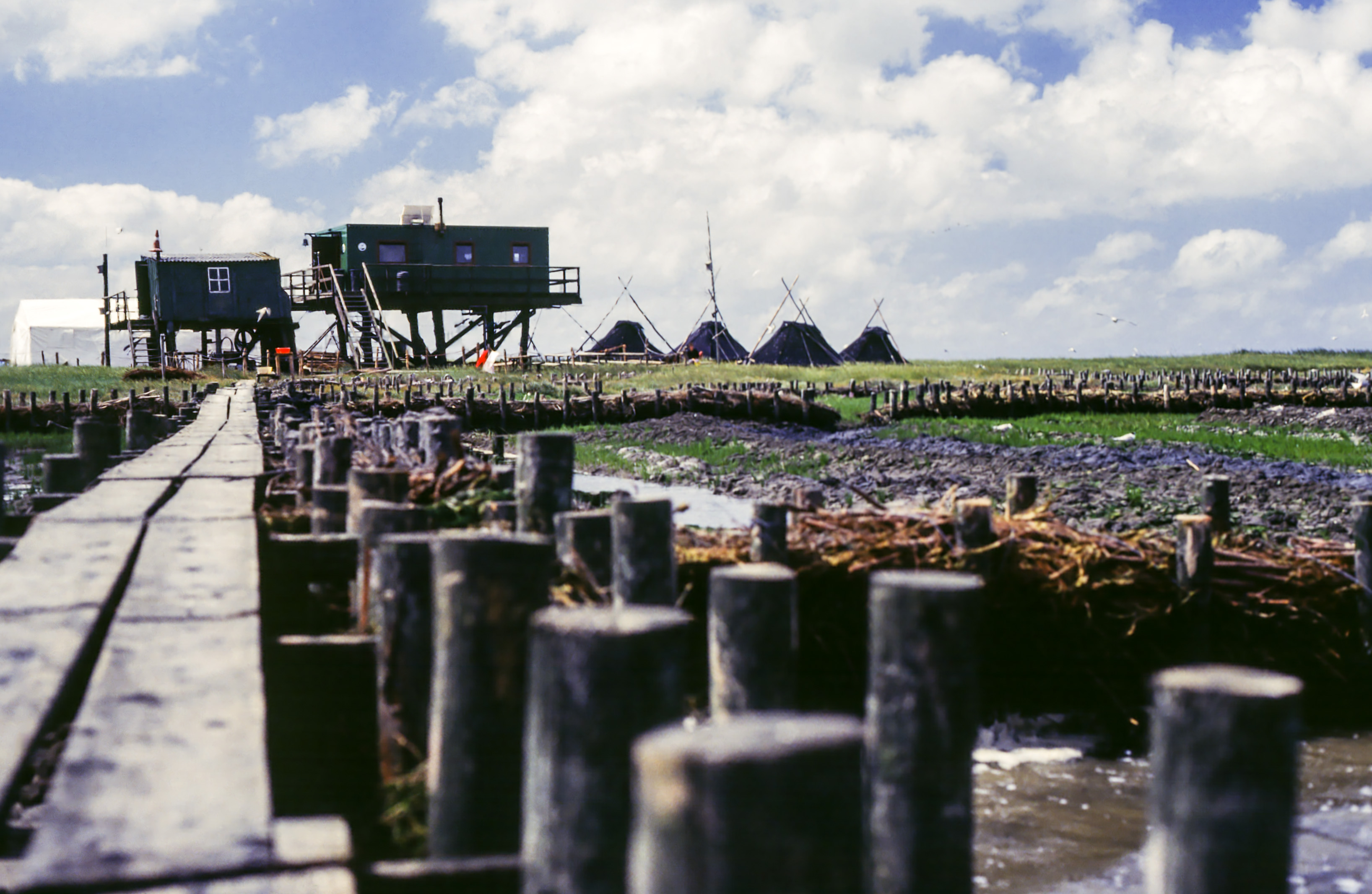
Jens Wand Hut and container shelter in 1989

Norderoog lies inside Protection Zone 1, the highest-level protective area of the Schleswig-Holstein Wadden Sea National Park. It has been an official nature reserve since 1939. However the island has been dedicated to birds ever since 1909 when Verein Jordsand bought it from farmer J. Feddersen for 12,000 German gold mark. Previously, Feddersen had made a living by collecting the birds' eggs and using the island to make hay. Jens Sörensen Wand frequently lived on Norderoog as a bird warden since 1909, and permanently from 1923 to 1950. The bird observatory at the Northeastern shore of Norderoog has been named after him.

This stilt house is safe from storm floods due to its construction. The first hut was built by Wand in 1909, but in 1995/96 it was replaced by a new building. In 2005, an additional loghouse replaced a container building and serves now as a dwelling for the warden and as a visitors centre. The installations are maintained by civilian servants of Verein Jordsand and by volunteers. The observatory is regularly staffed from March through October. Since the 1950s, coastal management has been conducted on Norderoog. In 1977, the western edge was fortified with rocks to counter constant land losses, and in 2000 a rock groyne was amended.

== Documentary ==
In 2008, Norddeutscher Rundfunk broadcast a television documentary Die Vogelmutter. Videotagebuch 2008 - aufgezeichnet von Anna B. [The birds' mother. 2008 video log recorded by Anna B.]. The film was recorded by a young female volunteer who spent three weeks on Norderoog during a voluntary ecological year.
