= Rolsø Parish =

Coordinates: 56.2464°N 10.4939°E

Rolsø Parish is a parish on Mols in Denmark. Until the 1970 Danish Municipal Reform, it was in Mols Herred (Randers County). The parish is home to 502 people as of 2016.

== Places ==
- Andrup (settlement)
- Bulbjerg (area)
- Ilbjerg (area)
- Mortenskær (settlement)
- Rolsø (settlement)
- Skovgårde (settlement)
- Vrinners (settlement, land lot)
- Vrinners Hoved (area)

== Historical population ==
In 2007, the parish had 525 inhabitants. However in 2008, the population rose to 532, a slight increase of what was seen in 2007. In 2009, the population slightly decreased to 525. Population continued to decrease in 2010 and 2011, when the parish had populations of 519 in 2010 and 518 in 2011. In 2012, the population dropped to 508. In 2013, for the first time since 2008, the population began to increase. The population was 510 in 2013. The population slightly rose again in 2014, when the population was 514, and the number of inhabitants stayed the same in 2015. Currently, the population is 502, which is a major decrease from the numbers in 2015.

== See also ==
- Rolsø Kapel
