= Rolsø Kapel =

Abandoned cemetery in Denmark

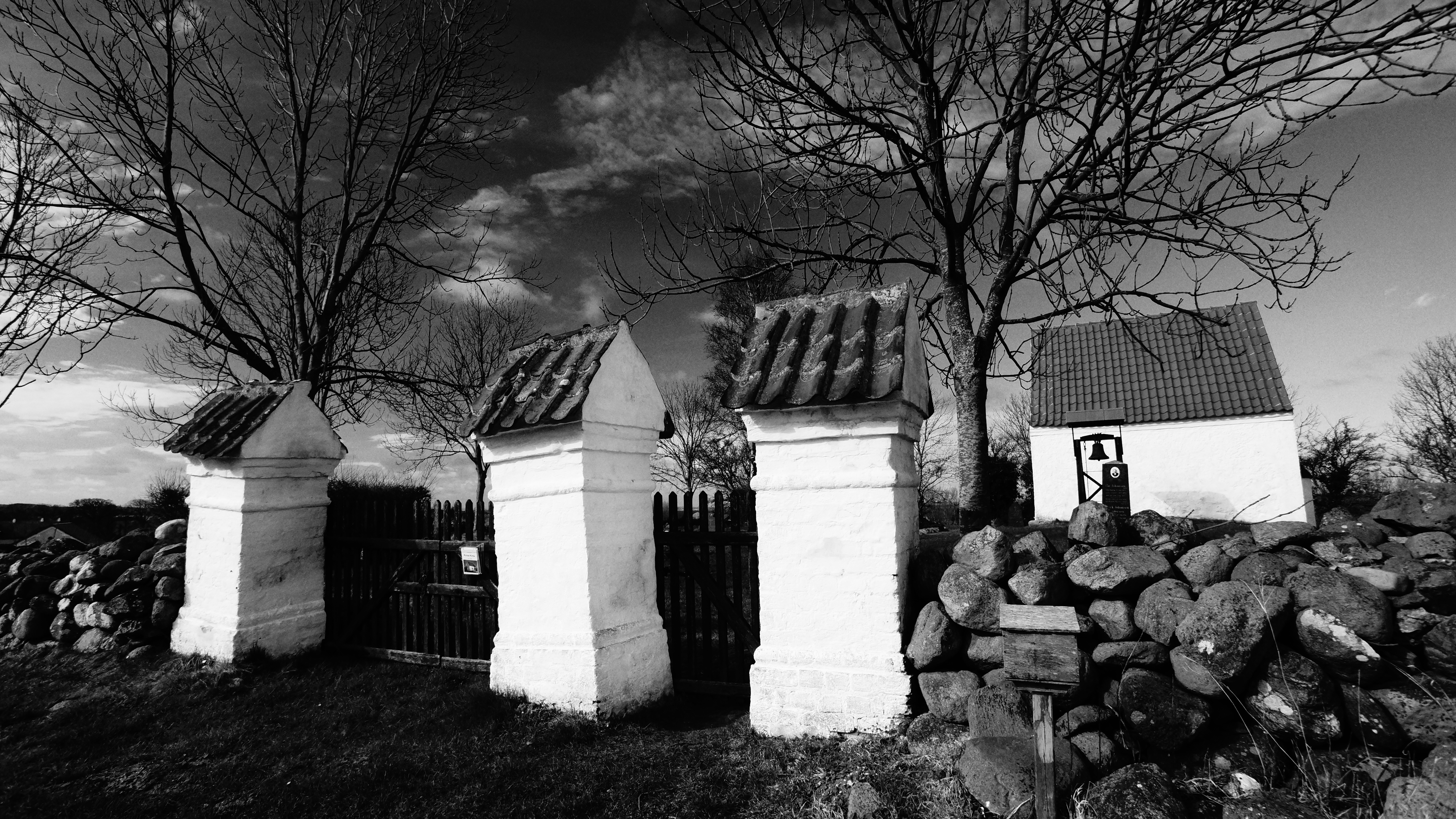
- Rolsø Kapel, Desolate Protestant Lutheran Cemetery
- Interactive map of Rolsø Kapel

Details
- Established: 1175
- Location: Rolsøgårdsvej, 8420 Knebel, Denmark, Europe
- Country: Denmark
- Coordinates: 56.23364°N 10.45997°E

Rolsø Kapel
- Location within Denmark
- Coordinates: 56°14′00″N 10°27′00″E

Rolsø Kapel (Rolsø Chapel) in Denmark is a desolate, abandoned, cemetery with examples of graveyard custom stretching back to the 1700s. The cemetery’s dilapidated gravesites belonged to Rolsø Kirke, (Rolsø Church) that was torn down in 1908. The remaining Chapel with cemetery lies by an unpopulated cape, that forms the northern mouth of Knebel Vig (Knebel Bay) into Århus Bugt (Århus Bay) on the southern part of the peninsula Djursland, in Denmark, Northern Europe.

As opposed to most other cemeteries in Denmark older graves have not been canceled. For example, one can find graves without stones, but with cast iron crosses, with the burial inscriptions cast into the metal. These crosses are over 150 years old.

Another example of old graveyard custom is teacher Chr. Johansens gravesite from 1897. Here a black and white photo of Chr. Johansen is embedded into the gravestone. This is in contrast to the picture-free gravesite norm in Denmark today, even though this is not the case several other places in the world, where photos of the deceased can be a central part of a gravesite.

The photographic quality of the photo of Chr. Johansen, taken in the late 1800s might seem surprising, as well as the fact that the seemingly porcelain based picture embedded centrally in the gravestone, apart from damage from a blow, does not show signs of aging, such as fading, even though it has been exposed to the elements for over one hundred years at a desolate cape by the sea .

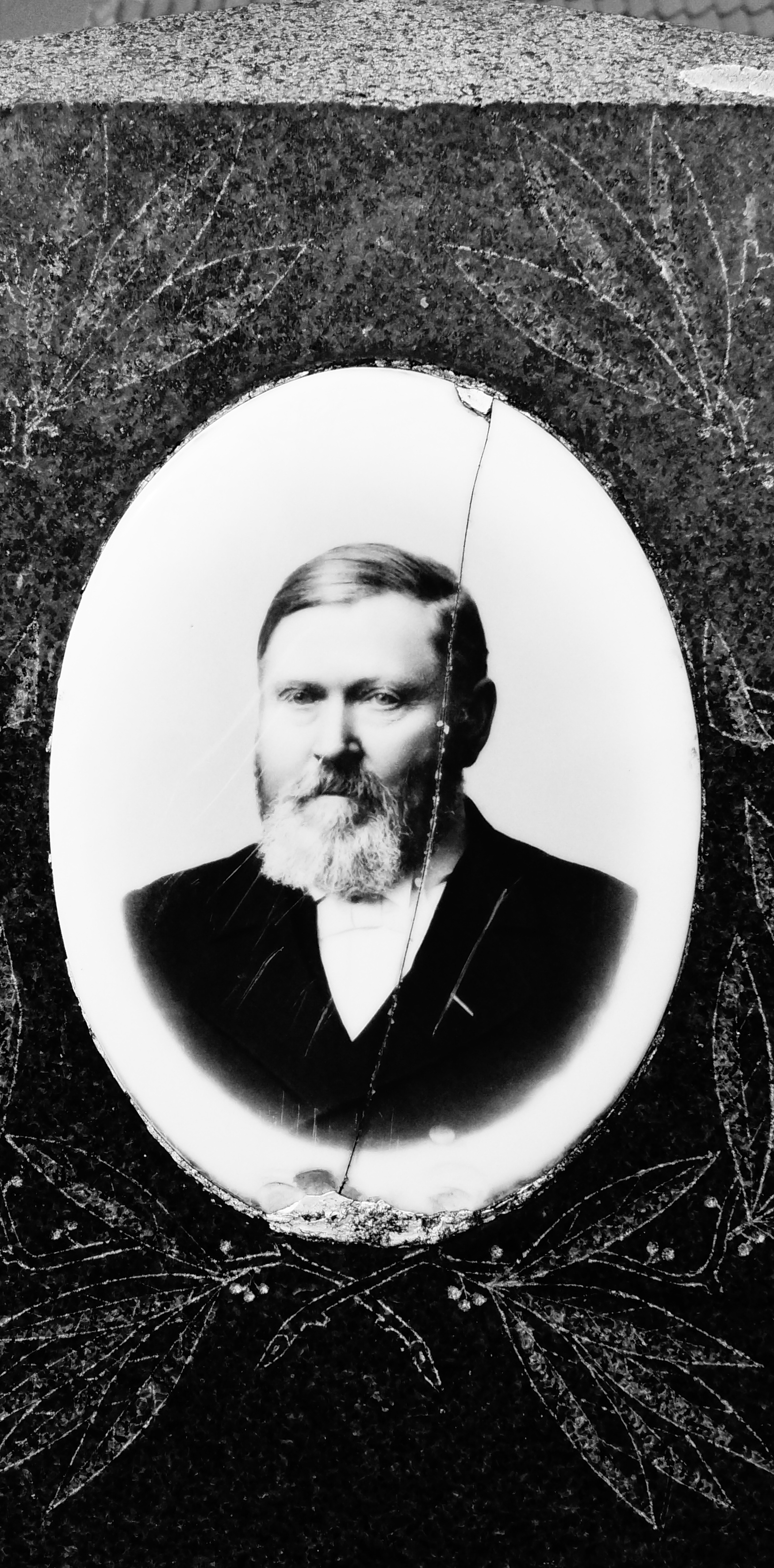
The photo embedded into Chr. Johansens gravestone, has seemingly survived for more than one hundred years without signs of aging, apart from mechanical damage from a blow, that has formed a crack

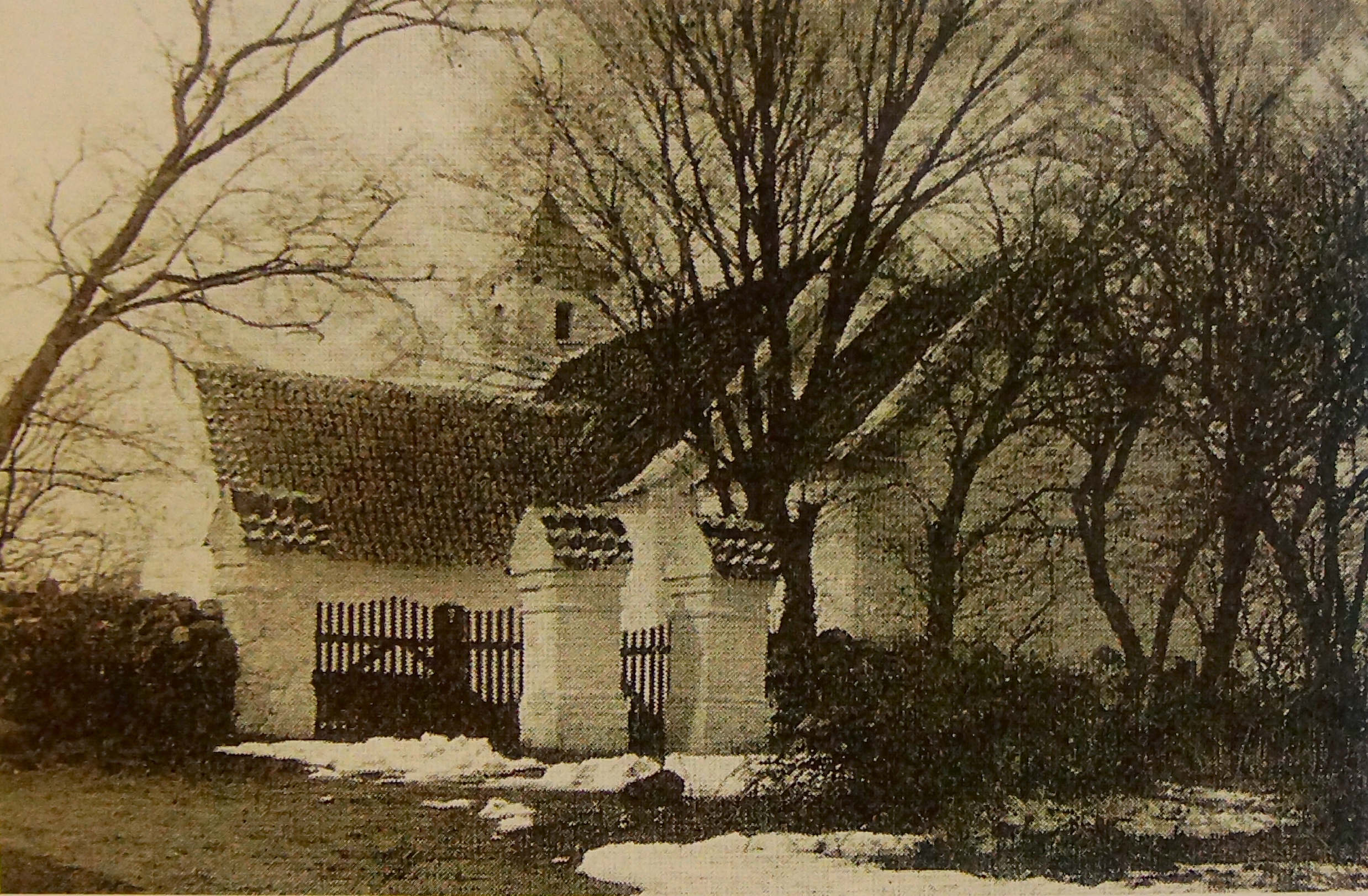
Picture of Rolsø Church before it was torn down in 1908. The desolate cemetery still exists together with the churches porch that has been converted into a chapel

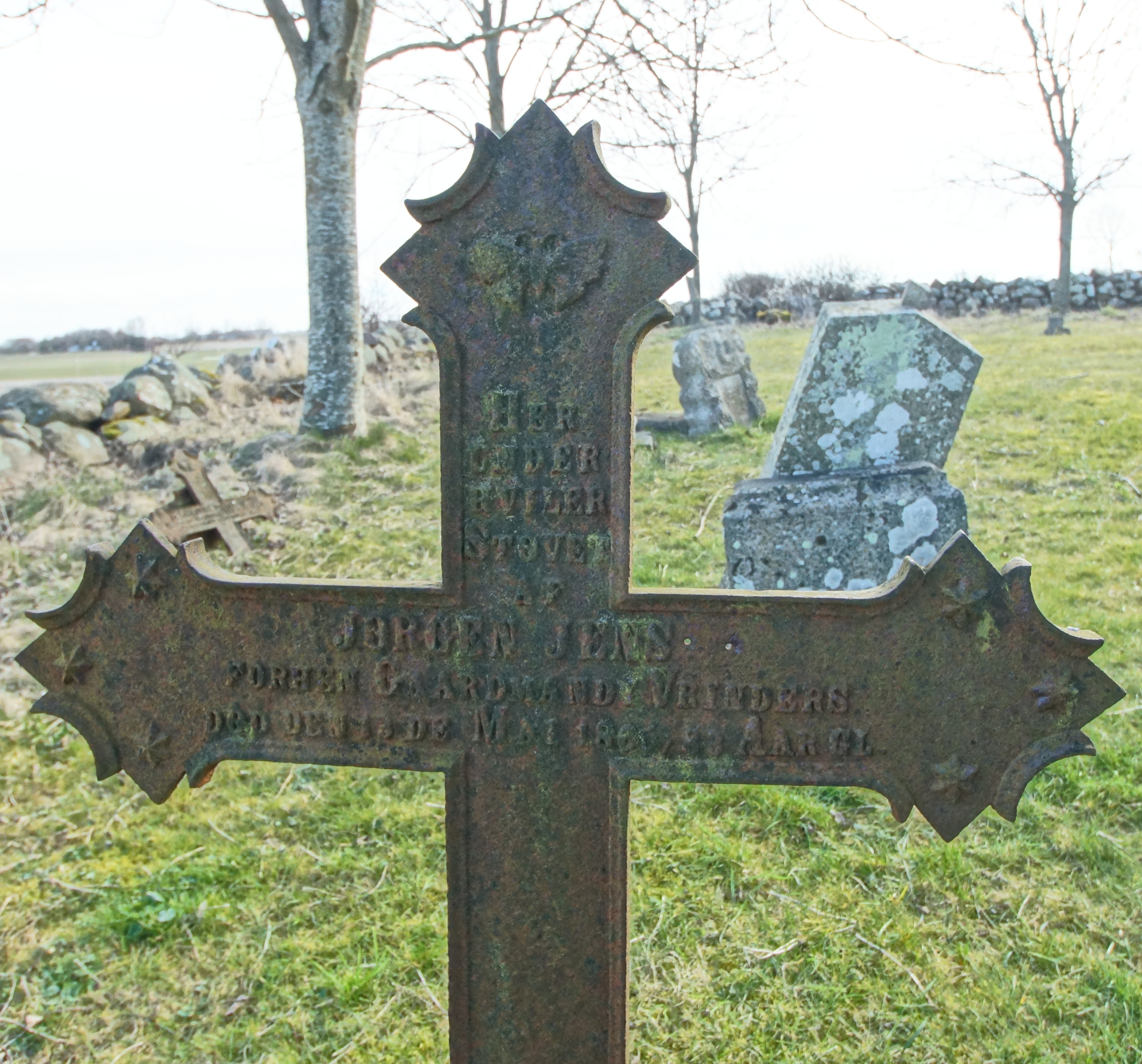
A cast iron cross with information about the deceased cast into the cross

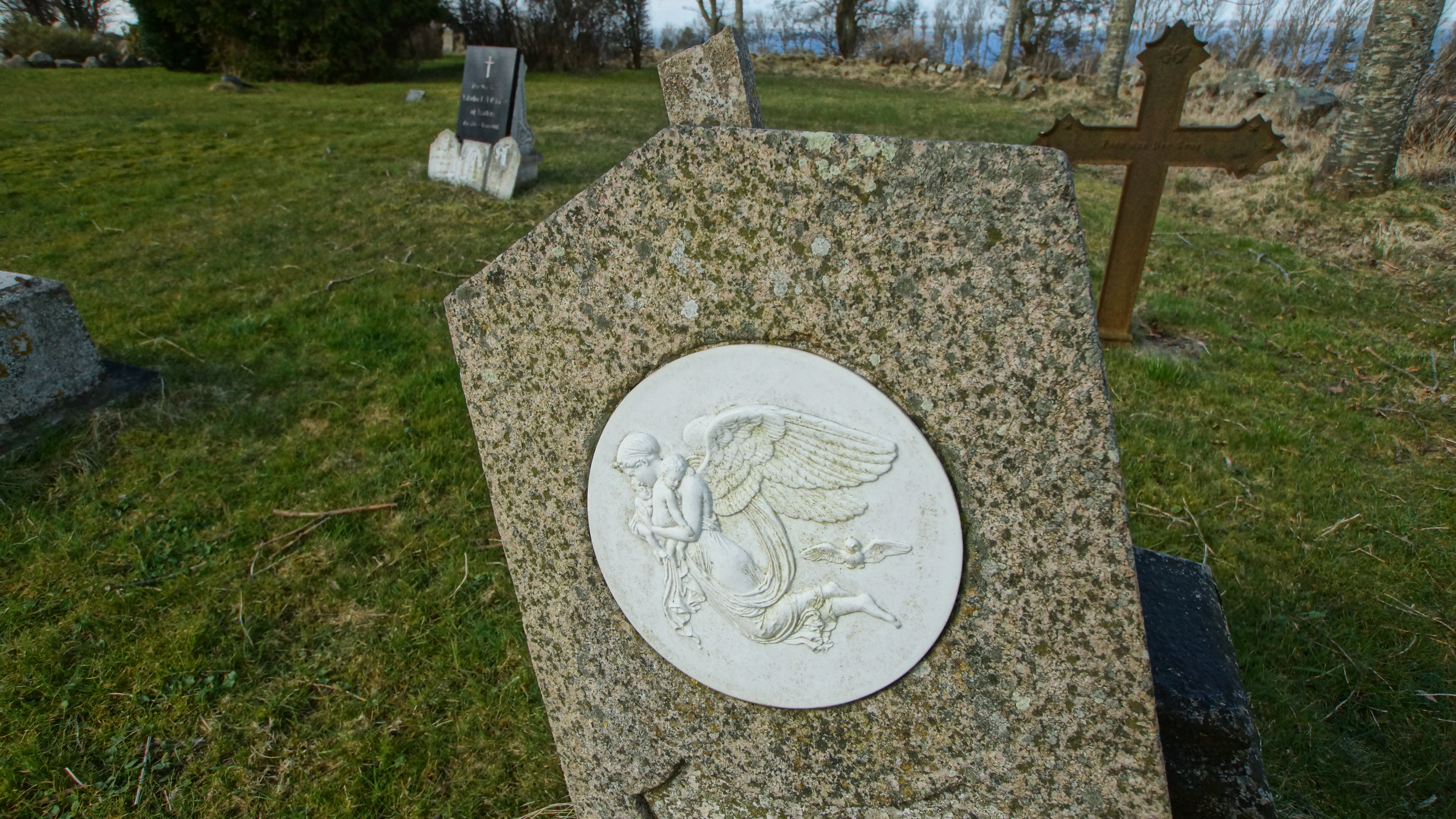
Tilted gravestone with a round illustration that might be made from white marble showing an angel with a dead child (on the way to Paradise) set centrally in the gravestone

== Dismantled Village ==
The story behind the churchless cemetery is that the squire of Rolsøgård in the year 1695, more than 300 years ago, got permission to dismantle the village, Roelse (Rolsø) close by. It consisted of Rolsø Church, 8 farms and 6 cottages including the rectory and a windmill.

This happened in spite of the Danish king Christian den 5.’s Danish Law, stating that ”…no village or farm may be demolished to improve the manor farms district…”

This can be read in a folder, available at Rolsø Kapel, written by Anne Bytofte in 1999. Here she mentions that the owner of the manor house, Roelsgård, was a good friend of Denmark’s autocratic king. This is mentioned as a possible reason why the squire succeeded in getting permission to demolish the village. Allegedly against the will of the priest. Other circumstances, such as what the inhabitants of Roelse thought about the matter, is an open question.

The manor house, Rolsøgård, remained, located close to sea between the mouth of Knebel Bay leading into Århus Bay. The church was also left untouched, but now with 2.5 kilometres (1.6 mi) to the closest village, Vrinners, where a, over the years, still bigger part of the congregation lived.

The king's permission to tear down the village of Roelse in 1696 was based on the condition that the priest and the congregation should have the possibility of seeking shelter in Roelse, when the church was used for service. Such as if the weather was bad. This could have been in the out-buildings of the manor house.

== Demolishing ==
In 1907 the congregation, that had begun to use the competing nonconformist believers mission house in Vrinners more and more, succeeded in gaining the financial means as well as the states permission to tear down the church by the cape, on condition that they built a new church in Vrinners. The new church was inaugurated in September 1907, and Rolsø Church was torn down the year after.

Today a distance of 2.5 kilometers between Vrinners and the church by the cape might not seem as much, but at that time transport was by foot or horse. Not least for elderly people, who sought to go to church every Sunday, as was often the norm in those times, a 5 kilometer walk across the wind exposed hills close to the sea in all kinds of weather, back and forth, could be a long way.

Thus, Rolsø Church, built around year 1175, existed for about 733 år. All that is left after 1908 is the porch converted into a chapel serving the cemetery. The new church in Vrinners from 1908 lies next to the road, Vestre Molsvej. One passes it, when driving through Vrinners to the Mols Hills on southern Djursland. With its red brickwork in modern standard seize bricks, as opposed to older church buildings larger monastic boulders, it deviates from the characteristic look of medieval country churches in Denmark.

== Baptismal Font Magic ==
When Rolsø Church was torn down in 1908 various inventory, including a Roman baptismal font built in the 1100s by the roman master stonecutter, Holter, was transferred to the new church in Vrinners. Holters granite baptismal fonts are often made with a thick chiseled rope circling the basin holding the holy water. The purpose of this ornamentation is based on the belief that the graphic magic of the unbroken band of rope prevents evil spirits crossing the rope and entering the holy water in the inner basin gaining access to the little child, according to the priest in Hammelev, Jette Seidelin Christensen.

At Hammelev Church, on the northern part of the Djursland peninsula, 5 kilometers north of the town Grenå, there is also a Holter baptismal font. Hammelev Church is built of limestone, and there is lots of middle age graffiti in the outer walls of the nearly 1000 year old masonry. A lot seems to be scratched out symbols aimed at confusing or entrapping evil spirits, by use of symbols based on specialized geometries, such as connected circles, that the spirits supposedly could not get out of, or cross, easily. This is also seen with the unbroken twisted circular band of rope surrounding the Holter baptismal fonts at the Rolsø- and Hammelev churches. Rope circles like these are also found on other middle age baptismal fonts made by Holter, seen in churches on Djursland, and maybe also in other parts of Denmark. These middle age artifacts were crafted in times when evil spirits and witches were something one believed in literally, and to such a degree, that the superstition gave way to the burning of women alive, if these people became suspected of practicing witchery.

Anne Bytofte also describes how Rolsø Church was first attempted built at another place, but here what one had built one day, seemed to become spoilt during the night, after which one set two heifers loose and moved the build site to the spot, where the two heifers were found sleeping the next morning. Here the church was left to stand for 733 years, until it was torn down in 1908 by the congregation in Vrinners.

== Knebel Church ==
Incidentally the torn down Rolsø Church was largely identical to the existing Knebel Church, located at the bottom of Knebel Bay a few kilometers from Rolsø Chapel. The churches are small white washed and spartan country churches. The nave of the torn down church in Rolsø was built from rough granite boulders with a length of approximately 10 meters, and 8 meters wide, while the east facing side annex was about 5 meters long and 6.5 meters wide.

== Video ==
Video from Rolsø Kapel on YouTube, https://www.youtube.com/watch?v=PlTnZ47FyK0
