= Joachim Rohweder =

German scientist and conservationist

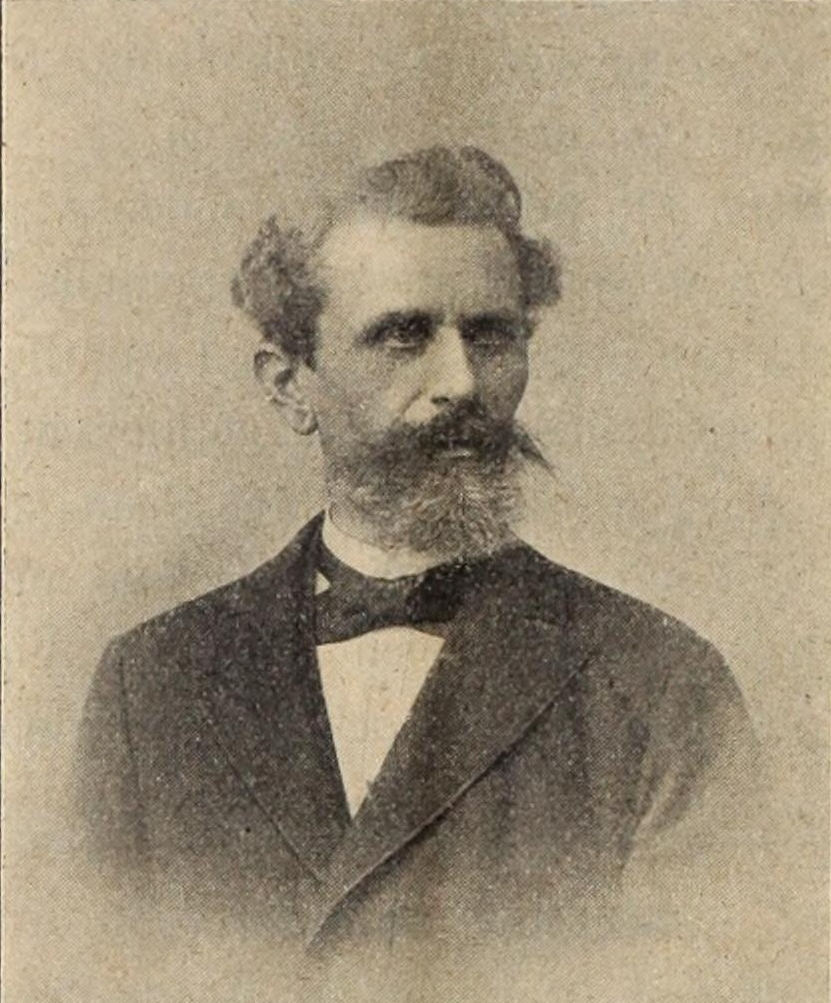

Joachim Rohweder (2 September 1841 – 29 December 1905) was a German teacher, ornithologist and bird conservationist. He wrote one of the earliest comprehensive works on the birds of the Schleswig-Holstein region.

== Life and work ==
Rohweder was born in Wapelfeld, Duchy of Holstein in a farming household. At the age of seven, he would have experienced the First Schleswig War. He studied at the village school and then at Hohenwestedt before training as a teacher. He was an assistant teacher at Hamburg during which time he attended lectures at the Johanneum. In 1862 he studied at a teacher training college in Bad Segeberg and took a special interest in the natural sciences. He graduated in 1865 and became a private tutor at the home of a magistrate named Stolz in Leck. He then worked at a naval school in Flensburg and in 1866 he moved to the Royal Gymnasium in Husum where he lived and worked for nearly forty years until his death.

Rohweder became an expert on the birds of the Schleswig-Holstein region and published notes in the ornithological newsletter edited by Rudolf Blasius. He became a campaigner for the protection of birds in the region and co-founded an animal protection association in 1879. The government of Schleswig-Holstein sent him to Heligoland in 1893 where he studied trapping practices and made suggestions for stopping them. He was involved in the protection of breeding seabird colonies on the islands of Sylt, Norderoog, and Süderoog. He was an ardent fan of Theodor Storm's poetry.

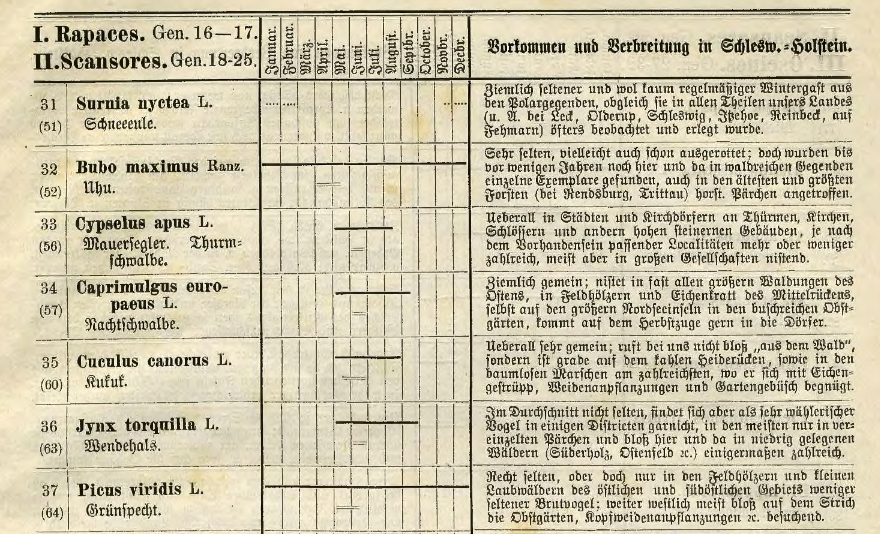
Part of Rohweder's list of birds of Schleswig-Holstein with seasonal distribution pattern indicated, 1875

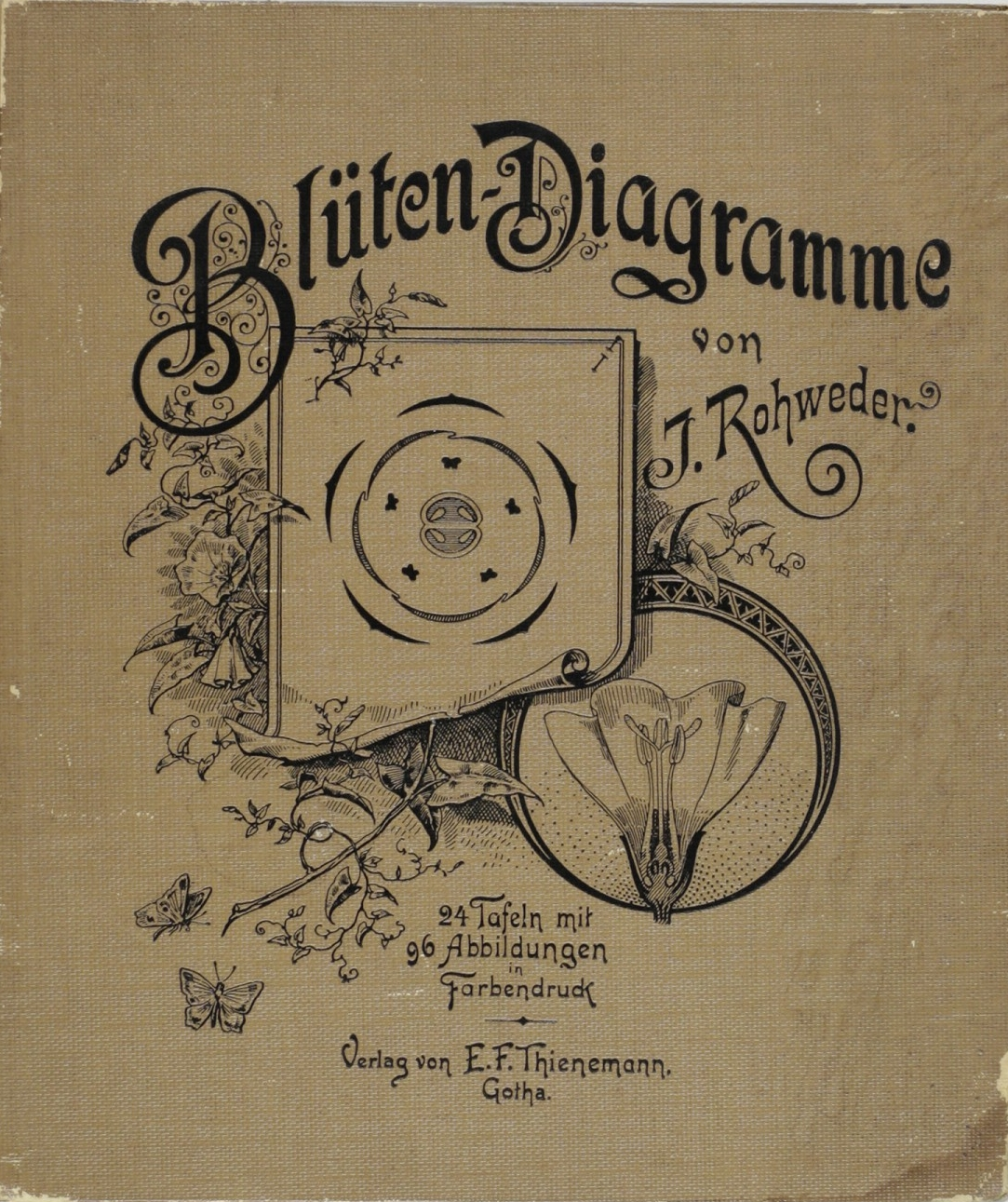
Cover of an 1893 book on floral diagrams and plant classification

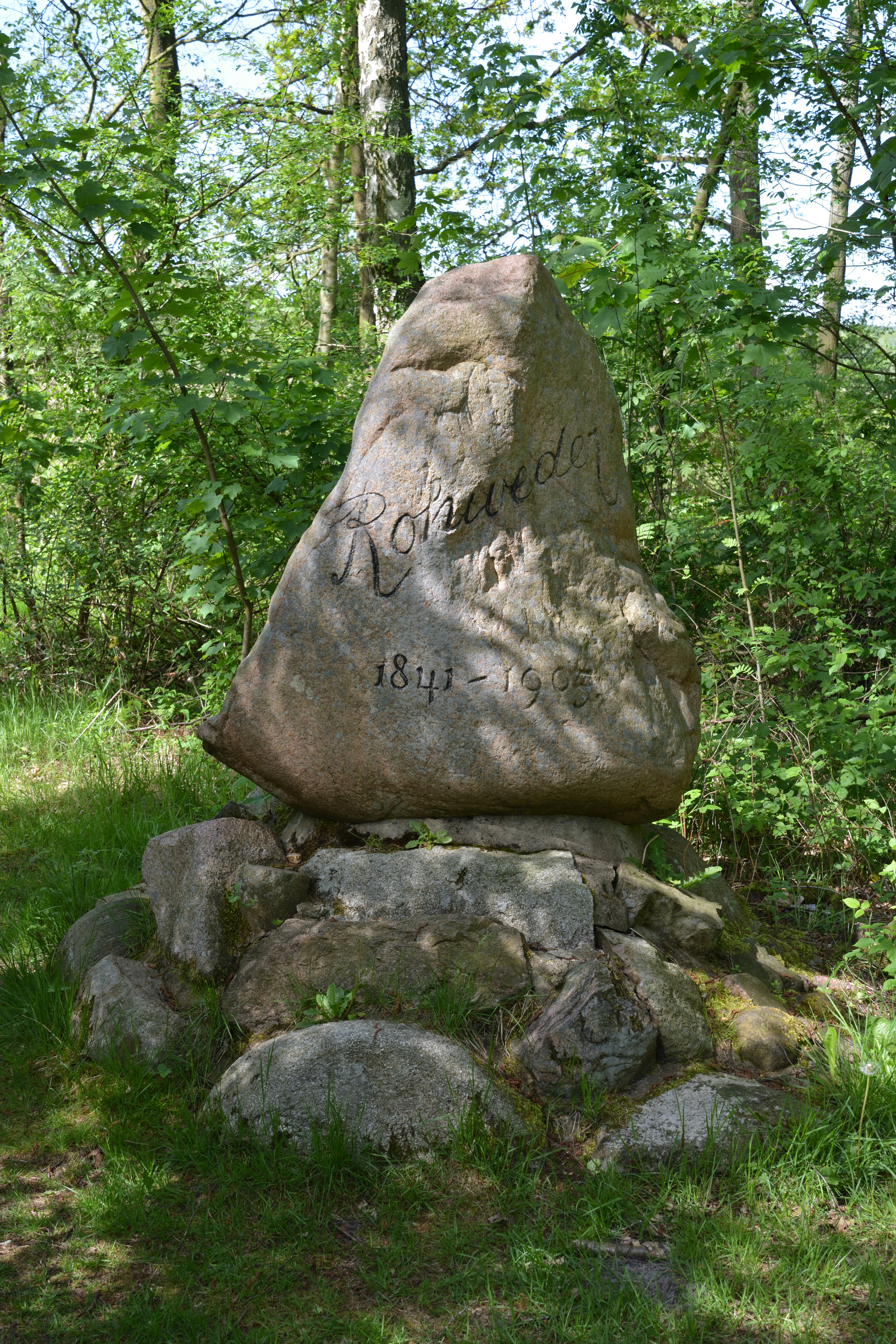
A memorial to Rohweder in Mildstedt
