= Vrinners =

Village in Rolso Parish, Denmark

Coordinates: 56°15′N 10°30′E

Vrinners is a village in Denmark on Djursland, with a population of 405 (1 January 2026), located on the peninsula of Mols, 9 km south of Rønde and 3 km north of Knebel. The village is located in the Central Denmark Region and belongs to the Syddjurs Municipality. Vrinners is located in Rolsø Parish. Vrinners church is located in Vrinners.
